= Comparison of Gaelic football and Australian rules football =

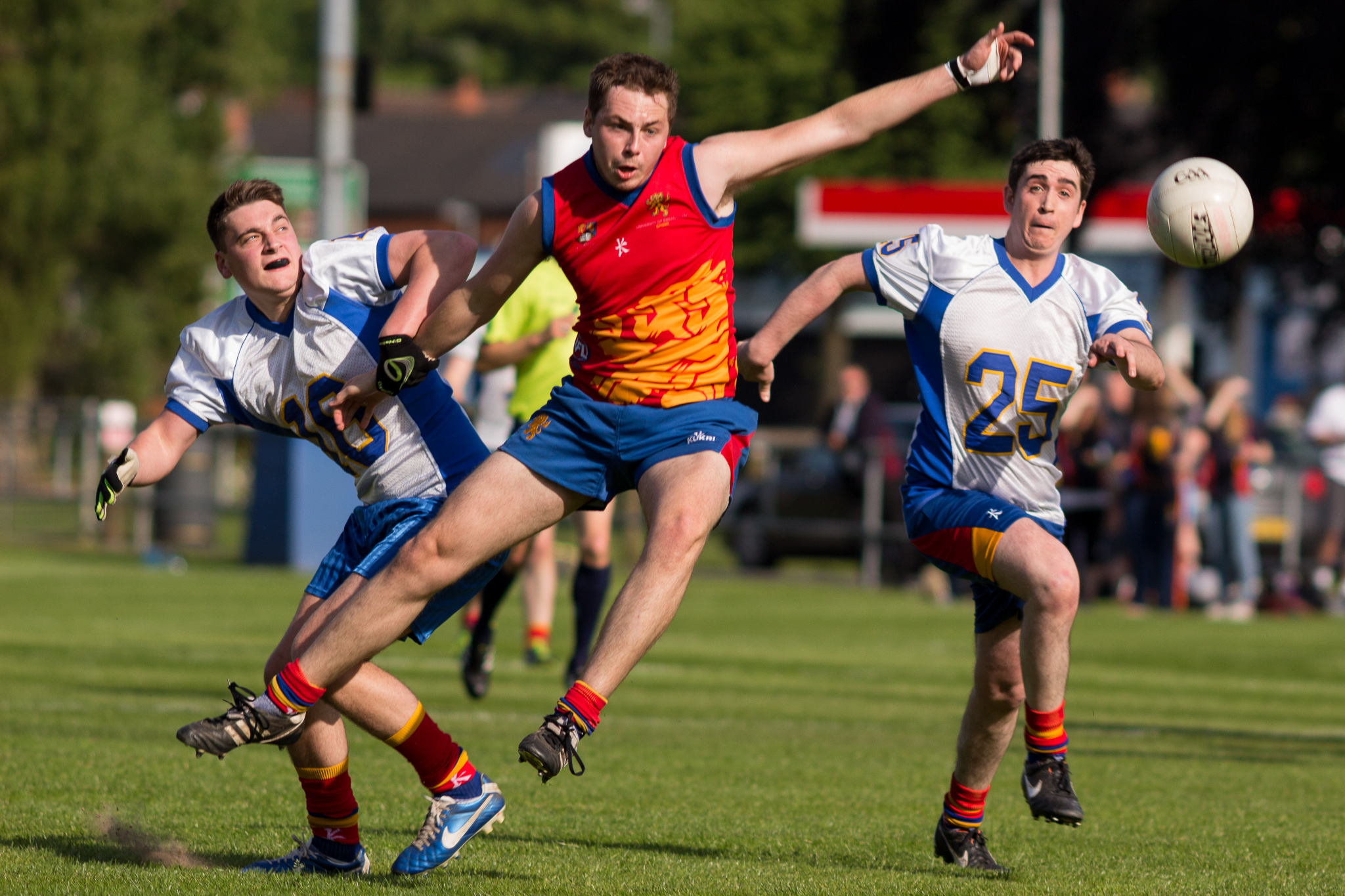
An international rules football match at the University of Birmingham, 2014

Australian rules football and Gaelic football are codes of football, from Australia and Ireland respectively, which have similar styles and features of play. Notably both are dominated by kicking from the hand and hand passing as well as rules requiring the ball is bounced by a player running in possession, both have a differentiated scoring system, with higher and lower points values for different scoring shots, both have no offside rule, and both allow more physical contact and players on the field than other football codes - 15 in gaelic football, 18 in Australian Rules.

Although there are also many differences, the similarities have allowed a hybrid game to be played, with a regular International rules football series between top Australian AFL players and Irish GAA players.

It was a popular assumption from the 1930s to the late 1980s that Irish football is the basis for Australian football, based primarily on the premise that Ireland is older than Australia and the two games look similar. The correlation between Gaelic football and Australian rules football also led to a belief that caid played some part in the origins of Australian rules football. Some historians have cited questionable cause as a reason for the assumption, while others suggest reverse causation as a possible scenario. Nevertheless the relationship of Irish football to Australian football and a hypothetical role in the Origins of Australian rules football remains the subject of debate. While there are some mentions of Irish playing football in Australia (English and Scottish foot-ball were far more common) before the formation of the Melbourne Football Club, there is no specific mention of either "Caid", "Irish football" or "Gaelic football" in Australian newspapers of the time. The earliest mention from an Irish sources in Australia in 1889 was that the old mob football had very little in common with modern Gaelic football which upon first appearance in 1884 was received as more a hybrid of English and Scotch football. Patrick O'Farrell, and Chris McConville along with Marcus De Búrca, have used similar logic to postulate that hurling (which was documented in Australia) was the influence, however modern hurling was not codified until 1879. Some historians claim that the similarities are largely coincidental, that there is only circumstantial evidence for a relationship between the two codes, and any resemblances are the result of something akin to parallel or convergent evolution. Most contemporary historians emphasise the influence of English public school football games.

More recent evidence primarily from Irish and English researchers including Tony Collins, Joe Lennon, Geoffrey Blainey and Aaron Dunne point to the GAA creating Gaelic Football as a hybrid of existing football codes (codifier Maurice Davin in an effort to differentiate from rugby has been found to have been making extensive notes on Association Football (soccer) from which some of the rules were based), and the Victorian Rules of 1866 and 1877 (which the modern Australian rules is based on), which were popular and widely distributed. More recently direct references to the published Victorian rules have been found in the rules of the founding Gaelic football club in Ireland, the Commercial Club of Limerick from the 1870s indicating that Australian football found its way to Ireland even earlier than this, perhaps in a similar fashion to the way it was introduced to the colonies of New South Wales, Queensland and New Zealand.

In 1967, following approaches from Australian rules authorities, there was a series of games between an Irish representative team and an Australian team, under various sets of hybrid, compromise rules. In 1984, the first official representative matches of International rules football were played, and the Ireland international rules football team now plays the Australian team annually each October. Since the 1980s, some Gaelic players, such as Jim Stynes and Tadhg Kennelly, have been recruited by the professional Australian Football League (AFL) clubs and have had lengthy careers with them.

Aside from game-play, a social difference between the codes is that Gaelic football is strictly amateur, whereas Australian football offers professional (Australian Football League), (AFL Women’s) and semi-professional (VFL, SANFL, WAFL, etc.) levels of competition, providing a strong financial lure for Irish players to switch to Australian football.

== Origins ==
=== Gaelic football ===
The earliest record of a recognised precursor to the modern game date from a match in County Meath in 1670, in which catching and kicking the ball was permitted. The earliest recorded inter-county match in Ireland was one between Louth and Meath, at Slane, in 1712, about which the poet James Dall McCuairt wrote a poem of 88 verses beginning "Ba haigeanta".

Gaelic football was codified by the Gaelic Athletic Association (GAA) in 1887. GAA founder and Irish nationalist Michael Cusack wanted the rules of Gaelic football to differ from rugby union, which was making headway in Ireland at the time.

=== Australian rules football ===
Australian rules football was codified in 1859 by members of the Melbourne Football Club. The first rules were devised by the Australian-born Tom Wills, who was educated at Rugby School; Englishmen William Hammersley and J. B. Thompson, fellow students at Cambridge's Trinity College; and Irish Australian Thomas H. Smith, who played rugby football at Dublin University. Their knowledge of English public school football games, and the conditions and terrain of Melbourne's parklands, influenced the first rules of Australian football. It has been suggested that Wills was influenced by an Australian Aboriginal game, Marn Grook, as Wills grew up in an area where the game was played by local tribes. Historians such as Geoffrey Blainey have argued that the origins of Australian rules football lie purely with rugby and other English public school games.

=== Traditional Irish football in Australia ===
In 1843, Irish immigrants in South Australia celebrated St Patrick's day by playing a game of caid in Thebarton.

Some historians have argued that Gaelic football influenced Australian football. For example, Patrick O'Farrell has pointed out that the Irish sport of hurling, which has similar rules to Gaelic football, was played in Australia as early as the 1840s, and may also have been an influence on the Australian game. B. W. O'Dwyer points out that Australian football has always been differentiated from rugby football by having no limitation on ball or player movement (in the absence of an offside rule), the need to bounce the ball (or toe-kick it, known as a solo in Gaelic football) while running, punching the ball (hand-passing) rather than throwing it, and other traditions. As O'Dwyer says:

These are all elements of Irish football. There were several variations of Irish football in existence, normally without the benefit of rulebooks, but the central tradition in Ireland was in the direction of the relatively new game [i.e. rugby] … adapted and shaped within the perimeters of the ancient Irish game of hurling… [These rules] later became embedded in Gaelic football. Their presence in Victorian football may be accounted for in terms of a formative influence being exerted by men familiar with and no doubt playing the Irish game. It is not that they were introduced into the game from that motive [i.e. emulating Irish games]; it was rather a case of particular needs being met…

O'Dwyer's argument relies heavily on the presence of Irish immigrants on the Victorian goldfields during the Victorian gold rushes of the 1850s, and a comparison of the two modern games. There is no archival evidence to prove a direct influence of caid on Australian football.

Irish sources in Australia in 1889 state that the old mob football played in Ireland bore very little resemblance to modern Gaelic football which upon first appearance in 1884 was received by the Irish as more a hybrid of English and Scotch football.

=== Australian rules football in Ireland ===
British historian Tony Collins argues strongly that the GAA hybridised Australian rules and soccer to differentiate from rugby, however takes the view that the development of Australian rules in the late 19th century was likely influenced by traditional Irish hurling (rather than Irish football) and points out that this sharing of codes across sports is a natural byproduct of globalisation.

Bill Mandle notes that although it lacks evidence that Gaelic Football's come into being in 1880s is a possible indication of Irish Australian influence back home.

Arguments were as follows:

==== The two codes were virtually identical in 1885 ====
Aaron Dunne, an Irish sports writer and historian, raises the similarity between the 1885 GAA rules and the 1866 Victorian ones arguing that it is obvious that the GAA used the Victorian rules as a template for Gaelic Football. The similarities included the length and width of the field, the number of players per team (20 vs 21) the distance between the posts, goals and behinds used in the scoring system, the requirement not to throw the ball and the requirement to bounce the ball, everything apart from the shape of the field.

Adding weight to this theory is former Gaelic footballer Joe Lennon's thorough post-doctoral research analysing of accounts of caid and GAA codified rules against the Melbourne Football Club rules of 1959 and Victorian Rules of 1866 and 1877 appear to indicate direct copying, some virtually verbatim by the GAA from Australian rules and other football codes, but primarily from the 1866 and 1877 Victorian rules. For example early codified Gaelic called for Australian rules style behind posts (not present in caid and later removed) with 5 point goals scoring (later changed to 3) and 1 point "behind"s all borrowed from Australian Rules, and Rule 27 in reference to kicking styles, Rule 15 relating to foul play and rules dictating playing equipment appear to be directly borrowed from the Victorian Rules. Early Victorian Rules was played with also a round ball until the introduction of the Sherrin in the 1880s. Other than the directly copied rules, analysts argue that so many of the rules are so similar to the Victorian Rules that it would have been impossible for the GAA rule makers not to have obtained a deep knowledge of the Laws of Australian Football.

==== Australian founders had little to no knowledge of Gaelic football ====
Jack Worral in 1926 wrote that the "Father of Australian Football" H. C. A. Harrison who had sought to "code of our own" in 1859 was genuinely surprised in 1927 to learn that the Irish had been playing a very similar game since the 1880s.

==== Gaelic football did not exist until the 1880s ====
Geoffrey Blainey in 2010 wrote:

If an historian of football wishes to press the argument that one code must have copied the other, then this conclusion would be difficult to escape: the style of play which Gaelic and Australian football share today was visible in Australia long before it was visible in Ireland. By that line of reasoning Gaelic football must have been the imitator. The present evidence, however, suggests that Gaelic football made its own way … which happened to be—in the style rather than the formalities of play—in the Australian direction.

Irish historian Garnham, citing R.M. Peter's Irish Football Annual of 1880, argued that Gaelic Football did not actually exist before the 1880s and curious on the origin of the distinctive features was of the belief that clubs from England in 1868 were most likely introduced elements of their codes including the "mark" (a decade after it had been introduced in Australia) and scoring by kicking between the upright posts. He believed these attributes to have been introduced by English clubs Trinity (1854) and Blackheath (1862) who had their own distinctive rules, rather than from those of Melbourne. However these English games were otherwise dissimilar to both Gaelic Football or Australian Football of 1885.

==== There was a motive and means for borrowing the rules ====
Like the Victorians, the GAA worked hard to create a game that would differentiate from the popular British sports of rugby and soccer.

While the GAA may have used Victorian rules to create Gaelic football, it is not known exactly how or when, Victorian rules were transferred to Ireland. One theory suggests that the origin was Archbishop Thomas Croke, one of the founders of the GAA, was the Bishop of Auckland and lived in New Zealand between 1870 and 1875. Croke visited Melbourne in both 1872 and 1875 at a time when Victorian rules was immensely popular His sister Mother Mary Ignatius Croke moved to Australia in 1866 and he made a planned visit to her Sisters of Mercy in 1875. Victorian rules was also known in New Zealand in the 1870s and was growing in popularity with the earlier games in Auckland played under hybrid rules of British and Victorian Rules not unlike Gaelic football, but its popularity lagged behind rugby, a game (which along with soccer) that the GAA viewed as a threat to Irish nationalism.

Croke's desire to help promote an Irish style of football as an athletic pursuit was well known, referring to 'football kicking, according to Irish rules' in his 1884 letter to the Irish Republican brotherhood's Michael Cusack and he favoured it being played on Sunday.

Croke had ample opportunity not only to witness the Australian game being played but obtain copies of the rules which were widely published and distributed. Croke was idolised by Gaelic Football's codifier Maurice Davin.

==== The founders of GAA and Gaelic football had strong links to Australia ====
There are many more links between the two countries than just Croke. Davin had other links to Australia, including his younger brother Denis, like his other brothers, an Irish athlete, who had emigrated there, and would have been familiar with the country's many customs. Like Davin, GAA founder Michael Cusack had both a brother and a sister John and Mary who had emigrated to Australia at a similar time.

==== There was strong Irish involvement in the early game in Australia ====
Between the 1850s and 1880s, there was a strong Irish Australian involvement in the early history of the game and officials regularly moved between the two countries, for example, Melbourne's Thomas H. Smith and the Brisbane Football Club's first presidents in 1868 and 1870 were all Irish, and Dr Kevin O'Doherty returned to Ireland in 1885, the Victorian rules were well known by them. They were by no means the only Irish Australians involved in the game at the time, there were many, many others.

==== The codes still borrow from each other ====
This rule sharing has evolved the Irish game and continues to the present as recently as 2017 with the GAA's introduction of "the mark" from Australian Football, one of the game's other distinctive features, in order to encourage more spectacular aerial contests or the "high catch" in Gaelic Football.

== Table of comparison ==
This list is incomplete

Rule or Term	Australian Football	Gaelic football
Length of Game	4 quarters (4 x 20 minutes) (total 80 minutes)	2 halves (2 x 35 minutes) (total 70 minutes)
Start of Game	Bounce and ruck contest (one player from each side only)	Ball up and contest (between four midfielders)
Equipment
Ball shape	oval (prolate spheroid)	spherical
Ball size	720–735 mm (28.3–28.9 in) circumference, 545–555 mm (21.5–21.9 in) from end to end	686–737 mm (27.0–29.0 in) in circumference
Ball weight	400–450 grams (14–16 oz)	370–425 grams (13.1–15.0 oz)
Uniform (jumper)	no or long sleeves	short or long sleeve
Field
Shape	oval	rectangle
Length	135–185 metres (148–202 yd)	130–145 metres (142–159 yd)
Width	110–155 metres (120–170 yd)	80–90 metres (87–98 yd)
Goal width	6.4 metres (21 ft)	6.4 metres (21 ft)
Goal height	Unlimited	2.5 metres (8.2 ft)
Point target	two 6.4 metres (21 ft) wide zones of unlimited height either side of the goal	any height above the goal
Advancing the ball
Methods of disposal	kick, handball (fist)	kick, handpass (open hand tap or fist)
Maximum running distance allowed	Must bounce ball every 15 metres (49 ft)	Must bounce or solo (kick to self) every 4 steps (can't bounce twice consecutively)
Ball goes out of bounds	throw-in; if out on full or ruled deliberate, free kick to opposite team	free kick to opposite team
Contesting Possession
Tackling	full body tackling allowed above knees, below shoulders. free kick to tackler if player in possession does not dispose if ruled to have had prior opportunity. ball- up if ruled not to have had prior opportunity, free kick against tackler if opponent is not in possession of the ball or if tackled too high/low	wrestling or slapping the ball from the player in possession only
Bumping (hip or shoulder charging)	any player within 5 metres (16 ft) of player in possession	player in possession only
Catching the ball	free kick (mark) is paid if ball travels 15 metres (49 ft) or more if off a kick, play on if off a handpass or ball is touched by hand from a kick irrespective of distance	free kick (mark) is paid if ball caught from a kick-out on or past the 45m line. free kick (mark) is paid if ball is kicked from a player outside the 45m line, the ball travels at least 20 metres and is caught by an attacking player inside the 45m line (must be kicked from open play, cannot be from a free kick or sideline kick) Otherwise play on.
Picking up ball	no restrictions	foot only (no restrictions in women's game)
Scoring
Goal	6 points	3 points
Over	N/A	1 point
Behind	1 point	N/A
Score goals by	foot or shin only	foot or shin if ball is being carried, any part if ball is loose or from a pass
Score points by	any part of body (rushed)	any part of body
Goalkeeper	No	Yes

== Field ==
Australian football playing field

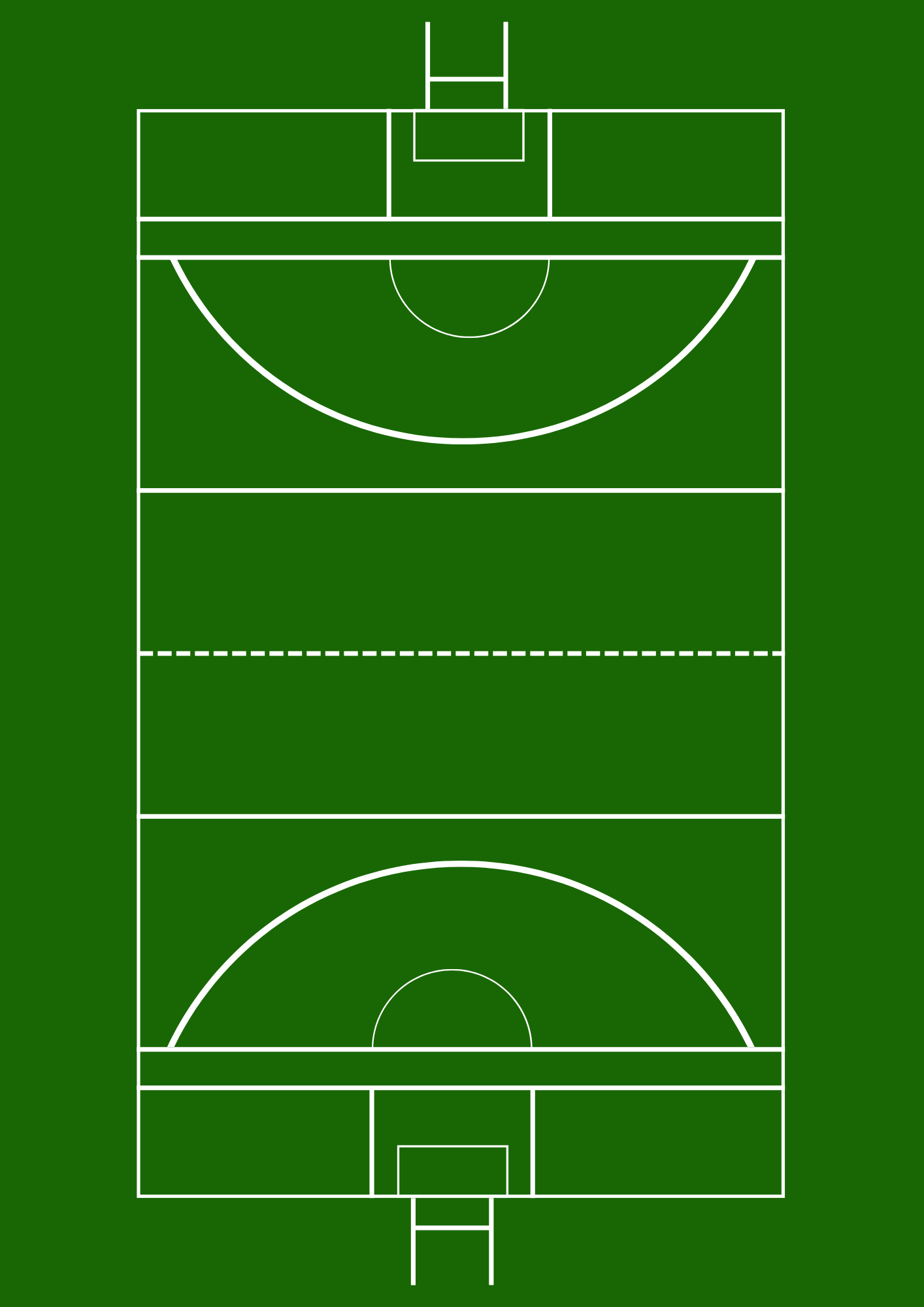
Diagram of a Gaelic football pitch

Both codes use grassed fields of similar length, however Australian Football fields are oval shaped, slightly longer and wider, and are usually also used as cricket fields. Gaelic football pitches are generally shared with hurling and sometimes camogie, and while they are somewhat larger both in length and width than what would be found in a soccer or rugby stadium, they can be successfully used for those sports where the GAA agrees. American football can also be played on a gaelic football pitch, as the dimensions of the gaelic field far outstrip those of an American or even Canadian football field. Playing organised gaelic football in stadia or fields designed for these other codes, however, is not generally possible as the fields are too small for the dynamics of the game.

Another key difference is the score posts. Australian rules consists of four posts without a crossbar or net, whereas Gaelic football consists of two posts with crossbar and net.

The Gaelic football pitch is rectangular, stretching 130–145 metres long and 80–90 metres wide. There are H-shaped goalposts at each end with a net on the bottom section. Lines are marked at distances of 13 m, 20 m and 45 m from each end-line.

An Australian Football playing field, is oval shaped, and may be 135–185 m long and 110–155 m wide. It has a centre circle, centre square to control player positioning at start of play, and superficial markings including the 50-metre lines and goal squares.

Goal posts are 6.4 metres wide for both codes.

== Equipment ==
=== Ball ===
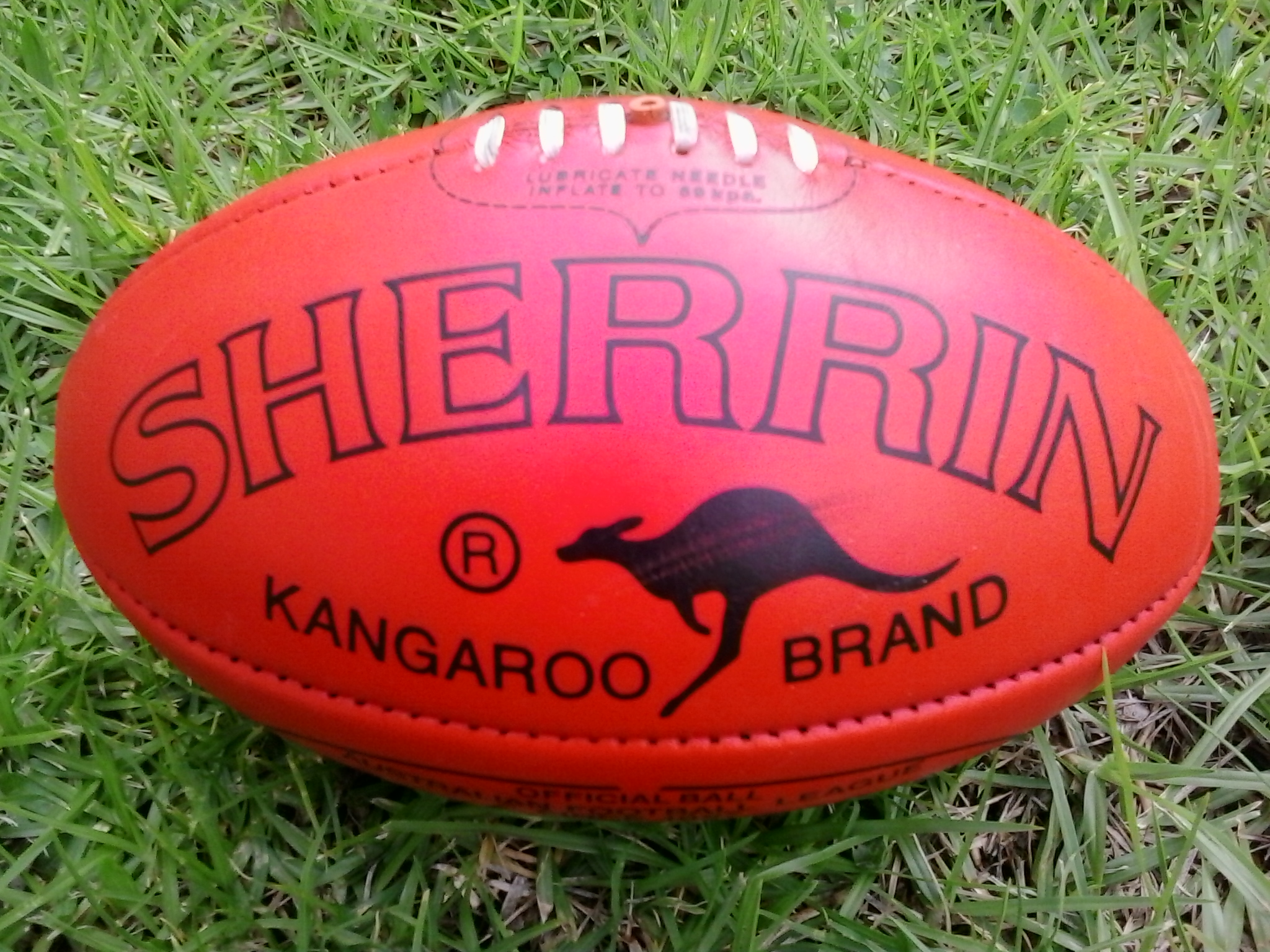
Australian football

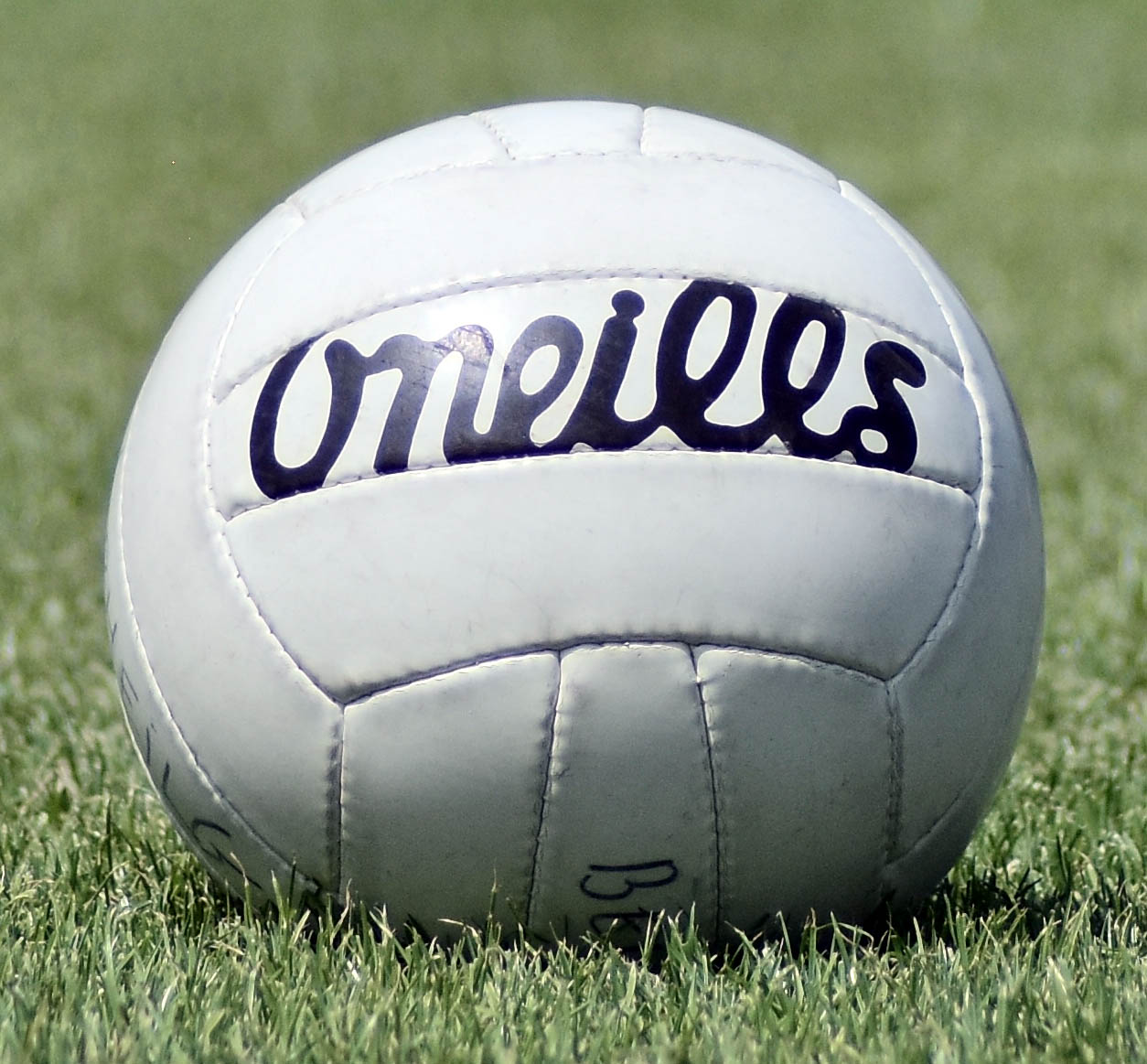
Gaelic football

The obvious difference is the ball used. Australian rules uses an oval ball (a prolate spheroid), similar to a rugby ball. This makes a difference in the variety and style of kicking. Australian rules is capable of producing a diverse range of kicking styles, the drop punt is most commonly used in the modern game, more so at professional levels.

Gaelic football uses a round ball similar to a soccer or volleyball, but smaller than the former to accommodate catching and holding. The round ball can be kicked anyway you like, inside, outside and middle of your boot. The instep is the most popular style based on culture, the drop punt used in Gaelic is a far superior kick in terms of distance and accuracy, but is rarely taught.

The first codified games of Australian rules football in 1858 used round balls. The different ball shape, as well as affecting kicking, subtly alters game play, as the bounce of the round ball is generally much more predictable than that of a spheroid. Gaelic football therefore is less prone to descending into a melee for primary possession, and physical robustness is a slightly less important issue than in AFL.

=== Attire ===
Australian rules has evolved to have sleeveless jumpers, often referred to as shirts, vest or guernseys, whereas Gaelic footballers wear short sleeved outfits similar to soccer or rugby tops and likewise often referred to as shirts or jerseys. Long sleeves (usually worn due to cold weather) are acceptable in both codes. Both sports tend to quite brief shorts, and socks without shinguards.

== Duration ==
Senior Australian rules matches typically go for 80 minutes, consisting of four 20-minute quarters (plus added time on; which ensures that many quarters in the professional and semi-professional leagues go for closer to 30 minutes, making the actual game length usually 105 to 120 minutes long).

Senior Gaelic football matches go for 70 minutes consisting of two halves, with a small amount of additional time for injuries and substitutions.

== Advancing the ball ==
In both games, players must dispose of the ball correctly, by hand or by foot and the ball must not be thrown. Gaelic football deems the open hand tap to be legitimate disposal, whereas Australian rules enforces the handpass or disposal with a clenched fist.

Unlike other forms of football, both games are notably distinct because of the absence of an offside rule. The main effect of the rule is to create a spread out field of play, minimal stoppages and man-to-man marking as security cannot be guaranteed by co-ordinated player positioning (as in soccer's off-side trap) or awareness of the current ball position (as in rugby's off-side laws)

In both games, a player must bounce (or Solo in Gaelic) the ball while running.

== Tackles and blocks ==
Australian rules allows full tackling above the knees and below the shoulders, whereas Gaelic football explicitly disallows directly tackling players.

Both sports allow "shepherding" or blocking, although in Australian rules, bumping is allowed on players not in possession of the ball, whereas in Gaelic it is limited to use on players in possession of the ball.

In 1886 the GAA banned tackling in Gaelic football, a rule change which marked a key divergence with Australian rules football.

== Gaining possession ==
Both games begin with the ball in the air. However, Australian rules has a bounce down and allows only two players to contest the bounce.

Both Gaelic football and Australian Football are openly contested and free flowing games.

The main difference is the awarding of a mark for any clean catch of over 15 metres off a kick in Australian rules, which results in a free kick or possession of the ball. This rule only exists in Gaelic in specific circumstances and is a fundamental difference between the two games. High marking or 'speckies' are one of the most important spectator attributes of Australian rules. In Gaelic football, regardless of a clean catch, a player must play on most of the time.

In Australian rules, when a ball is kicked out of bounds on the full, it is a free kick to the opposite team to the player who kicked the ball.

Australian rules allows picking the ball up directly off the ground whereas Gaelic football does not (the ball must only be picked up by foot).

Another key difference is that in Australian rules, tackling is allowed to either dispossess a player or cause the player to be caught holding the ball which results in a free kick. Gaelic football does not have such a rule.

Possession may change in different ways in both games:-

- When an umpire/referee awards a free kick to an opposition player
- Following an unsuccessful kick at goal.
- When an opposing player intercepts a pass.
- When the player in possession drops the ball and it is recovered by an opposition player.
- When the ball is wrestled from a player's possession

In both codes, tactical kicking is an important aspect of play.

== Penalties ==
In Australian rules, penalties available (in increasing order of severity) are:

- free kicks (loss of possession)
- distance penalties (in multiples of 15, 25 or 50 metres)
- ordering off (similar to a red card in association football [soccer], not used in the Australian Football League)
- reporting (to be sent to a tribunal post-match for suspension from future matches and/or paying a fine)

In Gaelic football, the penalties available (in increasing order of severity) are:

- free kicks (loss of possession)
- distance penalties (in multiples of 13 metres)
- penalty kicks
- Yellow Card (cautioning a player, similar to association football (soccer))
- Black Card (player 'sin-binned' for a duration of 10 minutes before being able to come back on, similar to a yellow card in rugby union)
- Red Card (player ejected from the game without replacement, similar to association football (soccer))

== Scoring ==
In both codes, goals can be kicked by foot or shin. Gaelic football does not enforce this, however, and goals may also be scored by other parts of the body.

A goal is worth 3 points in Gaelic football and 6 points in Australian Football.

In both games, a point may be awarded for missing the goal. In Gaelic football, this is scored above the crossbar (known simply as a point). In Australian rules, this is scored between the shorter post and the goal post (known as a behind).

There are usually many more goals scored in Australian rules, as there is no goalkeeper position due to the vertically limitless scoring area.

== The mark ==
The mark has been a feature of Australian rules football since the game was codified in 1859. After trials in the Irish game, a limited version of the mark — only for catches from kick-ins on or beyond the 45m line — was introduced from 2017. An advanced mark was introduced in 2020, applicable when a player catches the ball cleanly on or inside a 45m line from a kick in play (i.e. not from set-play) delivered by an attacking player on or beyond the opposing team’s 45m line, that travels at least 20m and without it touching the ground

== Players ==
Many of the positions have similar names and are very similar. There is no ruckman in Gaelic football and there is no goalkeeper in Australian rules, instead there is a fullback, although the fullback in Australian rules is not required to guard a goal in the same way that a goalkeeper does.

A maximum of 15 players per side can play Gaelic football on the field at any one time, whereas Australian rules permits 18 players per side.

== See also ==
- International rules football
- List of players who have converted from one football code to another
