= Origins of Australian rules football =

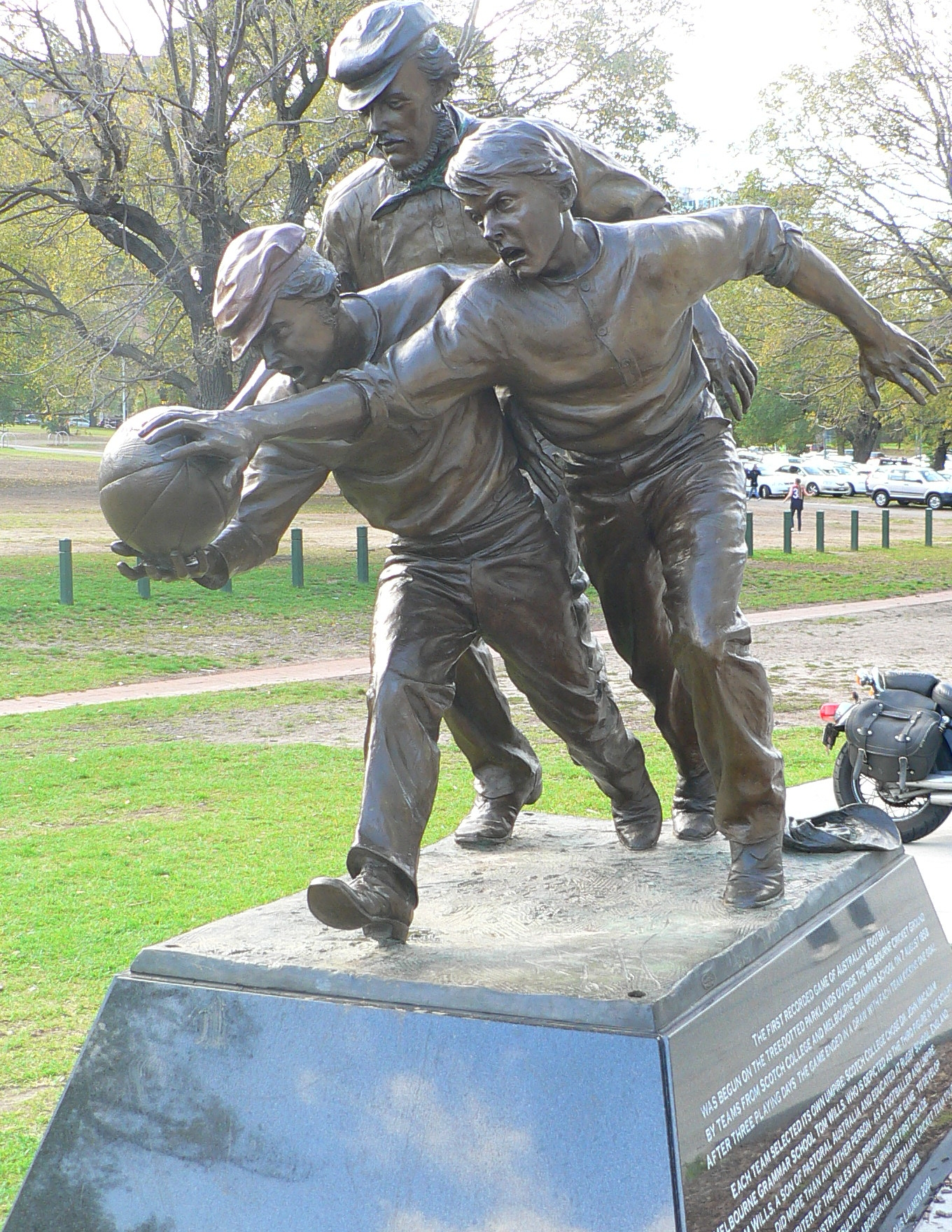
Statue next to the Melbourne Cricket Ground on the approximate site of the 1858 "foot-ball" match between Melbourne Grammar and Scotch College. Tom Wills is depicted umpiring behind two young players contesting the ball. The plaque reads that Wills "did more than any other person – as a footballer and umpire, co-writer of the rules and promoter of the game – to develop Australian football during its first decade."

The origins of Australian rules football date back to the late 1850s in Melbourne, the capital city of Victoria, which was at the time a British colony.

There is documentary evidence of "foot-ball" being played in Australia as early as the 1820s. These games were poorly documented but appear to have been informal, one-off affairs. In 1858, cricketers, sports enthusiasts and school students began to regularly play variants of English public school football in the parklands of Melbourne. The following year, four members of the newly formed Melbourne Football Club devised the first laws from which in time Australian rules football emanated, establishing as a unique football code in 1877 upon the formation of the Victorian Football Association by fourteen metropolitan and provincial clubs.

Professional historians began taking a serious interest in the origins of Australian rules football in the late 1970s, and the first academic study of the sport's origins was published in 1982. Since then, research has challenged various origin myths, including the view that Australian rules football is derived from the Irish sport of Gaelic football. Since the 1980s, it has also been claimed that indigenous football games, collectively known as Marngrook, may have influenced early Australian rules football. This claim is largely based on circumstantial evidence that Tom Wills, one of the game's pioneers, gained exposure to Marngrook while growing up amongst Aboriginal people in the Victorian bush. The proposed Marngrook link is still hotly debated amongst historians.

== Pre-1858 accounts of "football" ==
Advertisement that appeared in the South Australian Register on 22 March 1853 paid for by Irishmen from County Westmeath calling for fellow Irishmen in Adelaide to join them in playing a form of football in Thebarton.

Forms of football were played prior to European colonization, and include games such as Marn Grook.

With the arrival of Europeans, forms of football were played very early on in the Australian colonies with matches being played in by 1829 in Sydney, Tasmania and Melbourne by 1840, Adelaide by 1843, Brisbane by 1849, Most of these early games took part at local festivals and the rules under which they played (if any) not recorded, as such some are considered to have been comparable to mob football. In 1841 NSW Governor George Gipps threatened to ban football in Sydney if the playing of the game continued to flout Sunday observance standards.

Immigrants from England brought with them an awareness particularly of Rugby football (1845) as well as Eton football (1847) and Harrow football (1858), Cambridge rules (1856) and a variety of other games. The rules of Cambridge and Harrow, while more similar to modern soccer, shared many aspects of modern Australian rules in particular the absence of an 'off-side' rule, kicking from the hand, marking (fair catch), carrying the ball in hand, tackling or shoulder charging the player with the ball and kicking through upright goals to score.

Accounts from the Colony of Tasmania of football in the 1850s indicate that, as in early Victoria and most likely elsewhere, that matches were played under mostly English public school football games rules, but particularly Rugby, Eton and Harrow rules.

In the Colony of South Australia from 1854 a version of Harrow football was also being played. The rules under which the Old Adelaide Football Club played in 1860, while published, are now lost, however many assume that they were also along the lines of Harrow. This would, of course have appeared remarkably similar to observers (as were the games of Harrow and Cambridge) and as such, was a key reason why the colony later adopted the Victorian Rules to facilitate intercolonial matches.

In the Colony of Victoria the merits of these different schools and their footballing traditions were also known on the Victorian goldfields in 1858 particularly the Cambridge rules which were popular. Most notably, 1856 Cambridge laws permitted players to catch the ball, with a free kick awarded for a fair catch. Accounts of early football in Victoria in the 1850s was that football was particularly popular on the goldfields with the English playing school football, Scottish immigrants played a game similar to soccer and Irish immigrants playing a game of high punt kicking.

Historian Graeme Atkinson considers it likely that football was being played regularly in Geelong prior to the formation of the Melbourne club and that rules were drawn up prior to the first rules of the Melbourne Football Club which were drafted on 17 May 1859. Rules allegedly used by the Geelong Football Club in 1859 were originally written down by hand. The Geelong Advertiser appears to indicate that Geelong had Saturday football teams which regularly "hacked shins" in March and April and that the formation of the Melbourne FC spurred Geelong's footballers to incorporate their own club. Geelong is believed to have its own rules which included a running bounce to limit carrying the ball (at least as early as 1862) that was later adopted by all Victorian clubs.

The "house" rules played locally by clubs in this period borrowed elements from the various codes that are present today including Australian rules, soccer and rugby football with the rules played being decided prior to the start of the match.

== 1858 – Earliest documented clubs and matches ==
Football became increasingly organised and ingrained in the colony of Victoria in 1858, particularly in the capital Melbourne and surrounds.

The first written records regarding a football club in St Kilda date from April 1858. However, it was an informal version of the game. Two months later, on 15 June 1858, the earliest known record of Victorian football match was recorded. The game was played with modified rules between St Kilda Grammar School (now defunct) and Melbourne Grammar School on the St Kilda foreshore. There are also reports from 1858 of "football" clubs in Albert Park and Richmond.

=== Tom Wills' letter ===
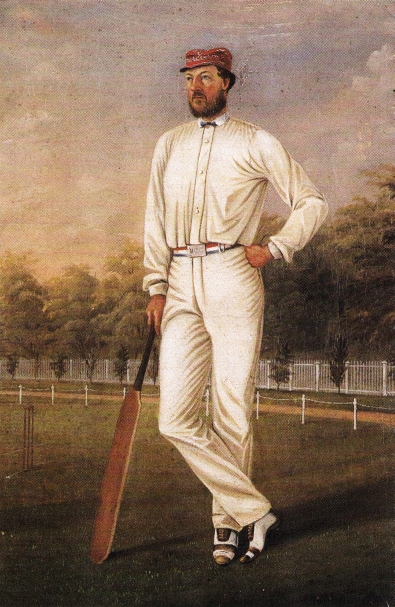
Portrait of Wills in the colours of the Melbourne Cricket Club

A little over a year after his return from England and Rugby School, where he played rugby football, Tom Wills promoted the idea of organised football in the colony of Victoria, most notably when he wrote the following letter, published in Bell's Life in Victoria on 10 July 1858:

Sir, – Now that cricket has been put aside for some few months to come, and cricketers have assumed somewhat of the chrysalis nature (for a time only 'tis true), but at length again will burst forth in all their varied hues, rather than allow this state of torpor to creep over them, and stifle their new supple limbs, why can they not, I say, form a foot-ball club, and form a committee of three or more to draw up a code of laws? If a club of this sort were got up, it would be of vast benefit to any cricket-ground to be trampled upon, and would make the turf quite firm and durable; besides which it would keep those who are inclined to become stout from having their joints encased in useless superabundant flesh. If it is not possible to form a foot-ball club, why should not these young men who have adopted this new-born country for their motherland, why I say, do not they form themselves into a rifle club, so at any-rate they may be some day called upon to aid their adopted land against a tyrant's band, that may some day 'pop' upon us when we least expect a foe at our very doors. Surely our young cricketers are not afraid of the crack of the rifle, when they face so courageously the leathern sphere, and it would disgrace no one to learn in time to defend his country and his hearth. A firm heart, a steady hand, and a quick eye, are all that are requisite and, with practice, all these may be attained. Trusting that someone will take up the matter, and form either of the above clubs, or, at any rate, some athletic games, I remain, yours truly, T.W. WILLS.

The initiative also soon reached Tasmania, where in July 1859 the Hobart version of Bell's Life included a cricketer's letter that similarly urged fellow cricketers and cricket clubs to play winter football.

=== Precursor matches ===
Two weeks after this letter's publication, Wills joined cricketer and hotel proprietor Jerry Bryant in organising scratch matches in Richmond Paddock outside the Melbourne Cricket Ground.

On 7 August 1858 a famous match between Melbourne Grammar School and Scotch College began at Richmond Paddock, which was co-umpired by Wills and John Macadam and also involved Scotch headmaster Thomas H. Smith. A second day of play took place on 21 August and a third, and final, day on 4 September. While the full rules of the match are unknown, the match was played with a round ball, the distance between the goals was approximately half a mile (approximately four times longer than the MCG playing surface), and there were 40 players per side. The game was declared a draw with each side scoring one goal. The two schools have competed annually ever since for the Cordner–Eggleston Cup.

Some regard these early matches as the first matches of Australian rules football, however to many it is clear that the game was still in the process of evolving. The Herald wrote in August 1858:

The game of football promises, as it deserves to be, one of the popular amusements of the ingenuous youth of Victoria. Hitherto, a modification of the Rugby rules has been adopted, which, in the opinion of some, might be altered for the better. But as the cricketing season is so close at hand, it is, perhaps hardly worthwhile to discuss the matter seriously.

== 1859: first rules ==
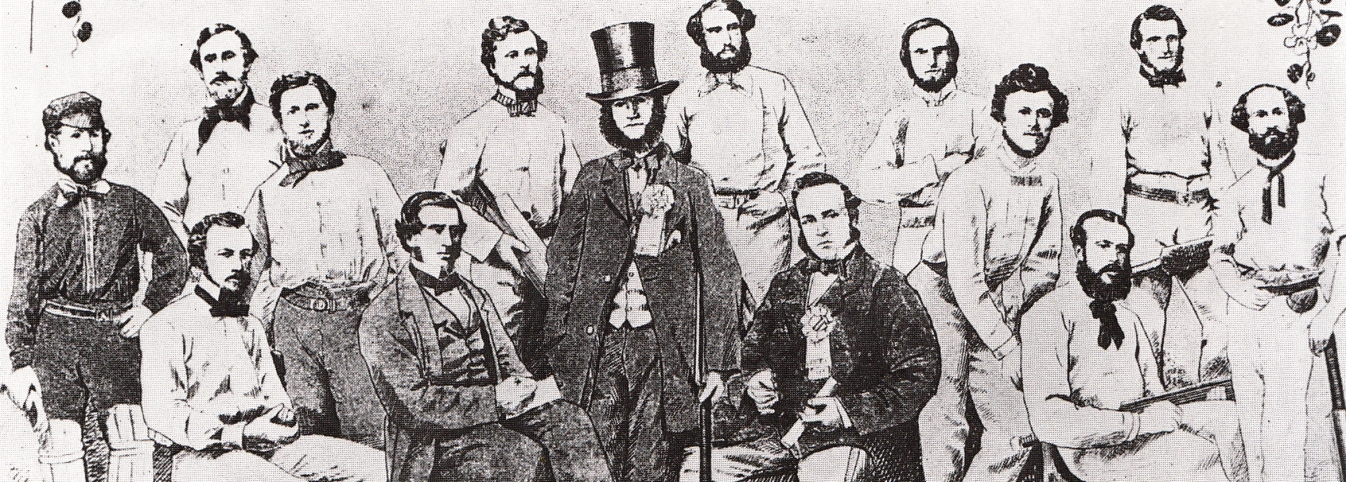
The Victorian cricket team, 1859. In May of that year, Tom Wills (seated, far left), William Hammersley (standing, third from left), J. B. Thompson (seated, second from left) and Thomas H. Smith (not pictured) met at the Parade Hotel, run by Jerry Bryant (standing, second from right), where they wrote the first laws of Australian football.

The Melbourne Football Club rules of 1859 are the oldest surviving set of laws for Australian rules football. The ten simple rules were drawn up on 17 May at a meeting chaired by Wills and in attendance were journalists W. J. Hammersley and J. B. Thompson. Accounts of the people directly involved differ. Some sources also claim that Thomas H. Smith and H. C. A. Harrison were also present. The meeting was held at the Parade Hotel, East Melbourne hosted by owner and Melbourne Cricket Club member James (Jerry) Bryant. The publican was a friend of Tom Wills with a personal interest in introducing football to Melbourne's schools. Bryant had played a role in organising early football matches at the nearby Richmond Park and his son was one of the first players. The rules were signed by Tom Wills, William Hammersley, J. Sewell, J. B. Thompson, Alex Bruce, T. Butterworth and Thomas H. Smith. Importantly, the rules were widely publicised and distributed.

A hand-written copy of these first rules still exists.

== Various theories ==
=== English school football ===
Geoffrey Blainey, Leonie Sandercock, Ian Turner and Tony Collins have all written in support for the theory that the primary influence was rugby football and other games emanating from English public schools.

The first rules of Australian football were published in the annual Victorian Cricketer's Guide alongside rules used in English public schools for the purpose of comparison. In the 1860 edition, J. B. Thompson announced:

Football, as played in Victoria, is now fit to run alone. I have accordingly omitted the Rugby and Eton rules, because we seem to have agreed to a code of our own, which, to a considerable extent, combines the merits while excluding the vices of both.

Writing to Wills in 1871, Thompson recalled that "the Rugby, Eton, Harrow, and Winchester rules at that time (I think in 1859) came under our consideration, ... we all but unanimously agreed that regulations which suited schoolboys ... would not be patiently tolerated by grown men." The hardness of the playing fields around Melbourne also influenced their thinking. Even Wills, who favoured many rules of Rugby School football, saw the need for compromise. He wrote to his brother Horace: "Rugby was not a game for us, we wanted a winter pastime but men could be harmed if thrown on the ground so we thought differently."

There are pronounced similarities to the Sheffield rules (which were being formed at a similar time). The most noticeable similarity was the absence of an offside rule and the prevalence of the fair catch (or mark). One theory claims that may have been due to the influence of Henry Creswick (possibly a relative of Nathaniel Creswick) who was born in Sheffield but emigrated to Australia with his brother in 1840 (the town of Creswick is named after them). He moved to Melbourne in 1854 and became involved in the local cricket scene. He played first class cricket for Victoria during the 57/58 season alongside 3 of the founders of Melbourne Football Club including Tom Wills.

=== Indigenous link theories ===
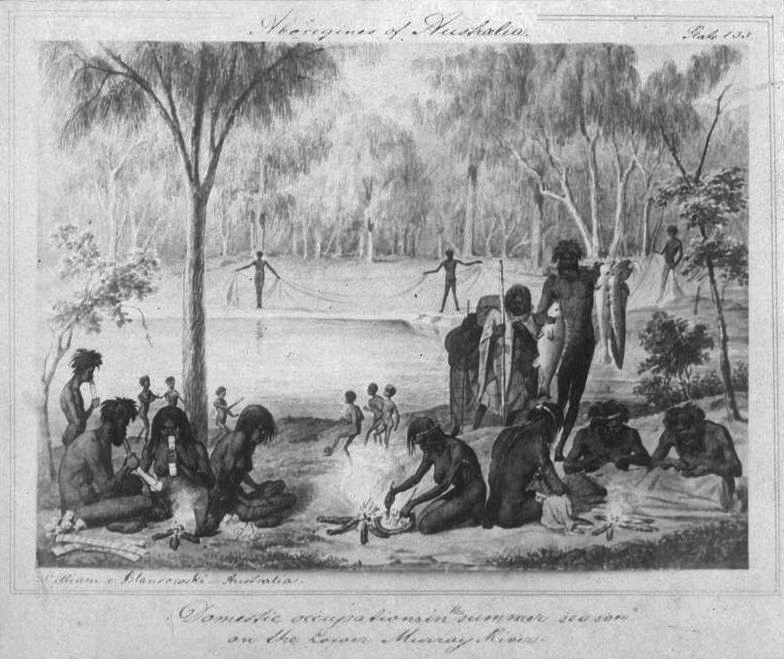
A drawing from William Blandowski's 1850s scientific expedition shows Aboriginal people engaged in domestic and recreational activities, including a kicking game with a ball made from Typha roots.

Some historians, including Martin Flanagan, Jim Poulter and Col Hutchinson postulate that Tom Wills, who was the son of a politician and a squatter and was educated at Rugby School in England in the 1850s could have been inspired by indigenous Australian pastimes involving possum skin "ball" games (sometimes collectively labeled "Marn Grook").

The founding influence of Marn Grook upon Australian rules football is said to be the punt kicking and high leaping and catching (marking) of the ball, the signature and most distinguishing features of the sport. The AFL stated in 2019 of the Australian rules football code: "It is Australia’s only Indigenous football game – a game born from the ancient traditions of our country."

Anecdotal evidence of such pastimes appears in the 1878 book, The Aborigines of Victoria, in which Robert Brough Smyth relates that William Thomas, a Protector of Aborigines in Victoria, had witnessed Wurundjeri Aboriginal people east of Melbourne playing a "foot ball" game in 1841. The account appears to fit the general description of the traditional game of Marn Grook. This appears to be the earliest record of Europeans observing such pastimes. William Blandowski's 1857 sketch of indigenous Australians in Merbein clearly depicts children playing a form of "foot ball". Written record of such traditional pastimes is otherwise scant and as there is no known record of these pastimes in traditional Indigenous Australian art it is not possible to trace its history further.

James Dawson, in his 1881 book titled Australian Aborigines, (Note: The full title of Dawson's book is Australian Aborigines : the languages and customs of several tribes of Aborigines in the western district of Victoria, Australia) described a game, which he referred to as 'football', where the players of two teams kick around a ball made of possum fur.

Each side endeavours to keep possession of the ball, which is tossed a short distance by hand, then kicked in any direction. The side which kicks it oftenest and furthest gains the game. The person who sends it the highest is considered the best player, and has the honour of burying it in the ground till required the next day. The sport is concluded with a shout of applause, and the best player is complimented on his skill. The game, which is somewhat similar to the white man's game of football, is very rough...

— James Dawson, 1881 book Australian Aborigines

In the appendix of Dawson's book, he lists the word Min'gorm for the game in the Aboriginal language Chaap Wuurong. of the Djab Wurrung people.

The Marn Grook connection is argued as follows. Wills arrived in Victoria's western district in 1842. As the only white child in the district, it is said that he was fluent in the local dialect and frequently played with local Aboriginal children on his father's property, Lexington, outside of the town of Moyston. This story has been passed down through the generations of his family. The tribe was one that is believed to have played marngrook. However the relationship of the Wills family with local Djabwurrung people is well documented.

Jim Poulter has argued that there was a direct link between the Australian rules football and sports played by some members of the indigenous Australian population. Poulter argues that Tom Wills had knowledge of Aboriginal oral traditions and language. However, when the rules of Australian rules football were codified, the status of Aboriginal culture in Australia was such that Wills may have been disadvantaged had he mentioned any connection, and as such "had no reason to mention this in discussions".

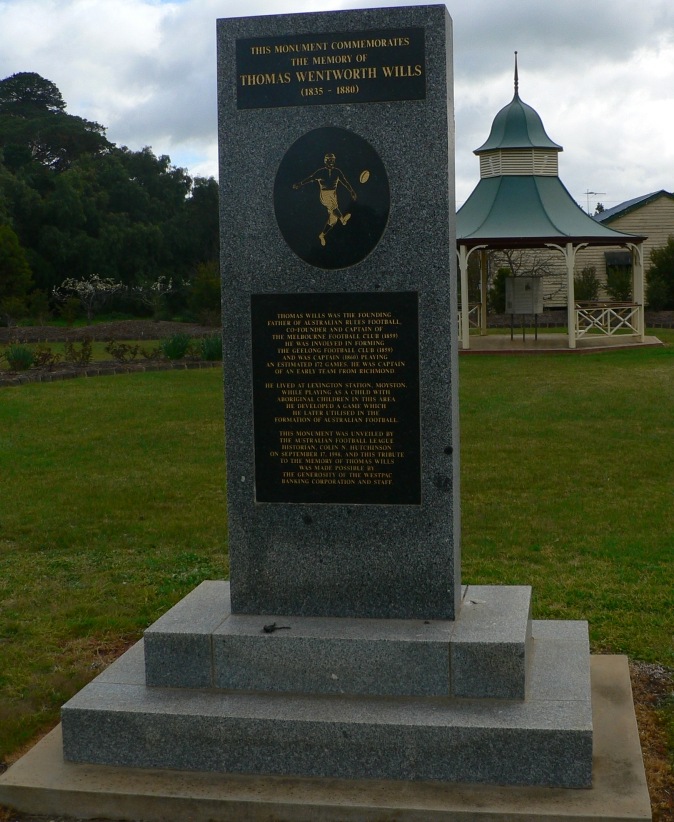
A monument to Tom Wills, erected in Moyston in 1998, makes a strong claim to the Marngrook connection.

Col Hutchinson, former historian for the AFL wrote in support of the theory postulated by Flanagan, and his account appears on an official AFL memorial to Tom Wills in Moyston erected in 1998.

Gillian Hibbins in the AFL's official account of the game's history published in 2008 for the game's 150th celebrations sternly rejects the theory:

Understandably, the appealing idea that Australian Football is a truly Australian native game recognising the indigenous people, rather than deriving solely from a colonial dependence upon the British background, has been uncritically embraced and accepted. Sadly, this emotional belief lacks any intellectual credibility.

Hibbin's account was widely publicised but was criticised by some indigenous Australians.

The people of Melbourne regularly saw the first national people and the way they lived. First Nation people camped on the outskirts of towns. As the government released more land, they were pushed further away. Many people in society in the 1800s would have been familiar with the games they played. They were also familiar with the games other races who came and took/shared their country played.

=== Gaelic link theories ===
The question of whether Australian rules football and Gaelic football have shared origins arises because it is clear even to casual observers that the two games are similar. The first record of an early version of Gaelic football is considered to be a game in 1670 in Meath (Irish county) where the match featured the catching and kicking of a ball.

It is notable that it was not until 1875 that a game of football was played under Association rules in Ireland. This suggests that reports of migrants from Ireland playing a form of football in Australia before that date, specifically Irish Catholics, were likely playing versions of Caid.

==== Supporters of Australian rules football's link to Gaelic football ====
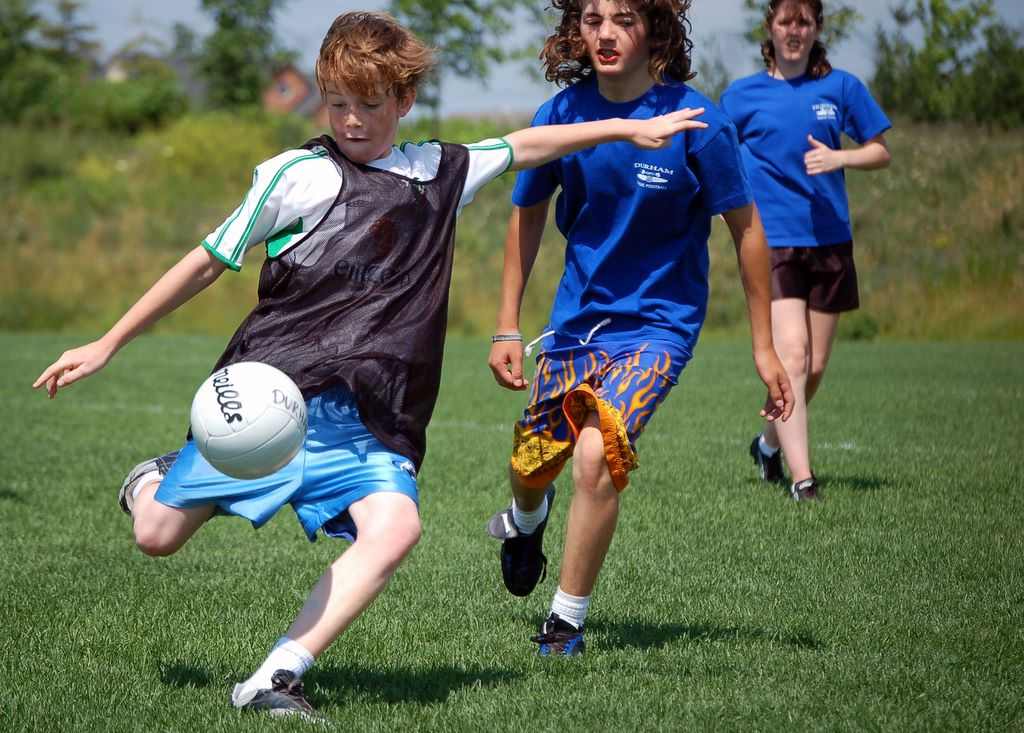
Children playing Gaelic football. There are striking similarities between Australian rules football and Gaelic football.

Both Irish and Irish Australian historians, including Patrick O'Farrell, Marcus De Búrca, Chris McConville, B. W. O'Dwyer and Richard Davis have supported the theory that Australian rules football and Gaelic Football have some common origins.

In a 1949 interview that appeared in the Daily News (Perth), Pat Rodriguez stated his belief that Gaelic football was "probably the father of the Australian rules code".

In 1982 John Daly stated his belief that the early games of Caid played by Irish immigrants provided the inspiration for the codification, and thus morphed into, Australian rules football.

B. W. O'Dwyer suggested that there is circumstantial evidence that traditional Irish games influenced the founders of Australian rules. O'Dwyer argued that both Gaelic football and Australian rules are distinct from other codes in elements such as the lack of limitations on the direction of ball movement – the absence of an offside rule. According to O'Dwyer:

"These are all elements of Irish football. There were several variations of Irish football in existence, normally without the benefit of rulebooks, but the central tradition in Ireland was in the direction of the relatively new game [i.e. rugby]...adapted and shaped within the perimeters of the ancient Irish game of hurling... [These rules] later became embedded in Gaelic football. Their presence in Victorian football may be accounted for in terms of a formative influence being exerted by men familiar with and no doubt playing the Irish game. It is not that they were introduced into the game from that motive [i.e. emulating Irish games]; it was rather a case of particular needs being met..."

==== Sceptics of Australian rules football's link to Gaelic football ====
Australian historians, including Geoffrey Blainey, Leonie Sandercock and Ian Turner have specifically rejected any such connection.

=== Geelong's game ===
Graeme Atkinson considers it likely that Geelong's rules were drawn up prior to the first rules of the Melbourne Football Club which were drafted on 17 May 1859.

In support of his theory are his "records" of the first recorded champion of formalised football in Victoria was Corio Bay (later Geelong) in 1856 and he also claims that an interclub match occurred between Melbourne Cricketers and Geelong in 1858 under compromise rules.

The rules allegedly used by the Geelong Football Club in 1859 were originally written down by hand. A reprint of what were believed in 1923 to have been the Geelong's eleven 1859 rules appeared in the Geelong Advertiser courtesy of Fred Blackham from an old folded card, which appeared to differ only slightly from Melbourne Football Club's rules. However, there is no original record earlier than 1866 when they were incorporated by way of compromise into the official Victorian Rules by H C A Harrison and committee:

1. Distance between goals and the goal posts to be decided by captains.
2. Teams of 25 in grand matches, but up to 30 against odds.
3. Matches to be played in 2 halves of 50 minutes. At the end of first 50 teams may leave ground for 20 minutes for refreshments but must be ready to resume on time otherwise rival captain can call game off or (if his side has scored) claim it as a win.
4. Game played with 200-yard [sic.] [182.9-metre] space, same to be measured equally on each side of a line drawn through the centre of the two goals, and two posts to be called "kick off" posts shall be erected at a distance of 20 yards [1.83 metres] on each side of the goal posts at both ends and in a straight line between them.
5. When kicked behind goal, ball may be brought 20 yards in front of any portion of the space between the kick off and kicked as nearly as possibly [sic.] in line with opposite goal.
6. Ball must be bounced every 10 or 20 yards if carried.
7. Tripping, holding, hacking prohibited. Pushing with hands or body is allowed when any player is in rapid motion or in possession of ball, except in the case of a mark.
8. Mark is when a player catches the ball before it hits the ground and has been clearly kicked by another player.
9. Handball only allowed if ball held clearly in one hand and punched or hit out with other. If caught, no mark. Throwing prohibited.
10. Before game captains toss for ends.
11. In case of infringements, captain may claim free from where breach occurred. Except where umpires appointed, opposing captain to adjudicate.
12. In all grand matches two umpires – one from each side – will take up position as near as possible between the goal posts and centre. When breach is made appeal to go to nearest umpire.

== The Founder of the Game ==
In the 21st century the role played by Tom Wills in the establishment of the game is generally recognised as pivotal. However, in the latter part of the 19th century and much of the 20th, H.C.A. Harrison was accepted as "the father of Australian rules football". He was to become a vice-president of the Victorian Football Association and later the inaugural chairman of the Victorian Football League and was actively associated with the Melbourne Football Club until the late 1920s.

Journalist Martin Flanagan postulates that the game's administrators engaged in historical revisionism of the story of Tom Wills involvement in the origins of football because he was a drunkard and because he committed suicide. In its official account of the game's history for its 150th celebrations, however the AFL downgraded Wills and H. C. A. Harrison as the fathers of Australian football, and does not recognise any connection to traditional indigenous games. This stance was not without controversy.

== See also ==
- History of Australian rules football
- History of Australian rules football in Victoria (1859-1900)
- List of Australian rules football clubs by date of establishment
- Australian rules football in Victoria

== Bibliography ==
Books

- Blainey, Geoffrey (2003). A Game of Our Own: The Origins of Australian Football. Black Inc. ISBN 978-1-86395-347-4.
- Dawson, James (1981) [1881]. Australian Aborigines: The Languages and Customs of Several Tribes of Aborigines in the Western District of Victoria, Australia. Australian Institute of Aboriginal Studies. ISBN 978-0-85575-118-0.
- Hess, Rob (2008). A National Game: The History of Australian Rules Football. Viking. ISBN 978-0-670-07089-3.
- Pennings, Mark (2012). Origins of Australian Football: Victoria's Early History: Volume 1: Amateur Heroes and the Rise of Clubs, 1858 to 1876. Connor Court Publishing Pty Ltd. ISBN 9781921421471.
- Sandercock, Leonie; Turner, Ian (1982). Up Where, Cazaly?: The Great Australian Game. Granada. ISBN 978-0-586-08427-4.

Journals

- Hibbins, Gillian (1989). "The Cambridge Connection: The Origin of Australian Rules Football". The International Journal of the History of Sport. 6 (2): 172–192. doi:10.1080/09523368908713687.
- Hibbins, Gillian; Ruddell, Trevor (2009). ""A Code of Our Own": Celebrating 150 Years of the Rules of Australian Football" (PDF). The Yorker (39).
