= History of Australian rules football =

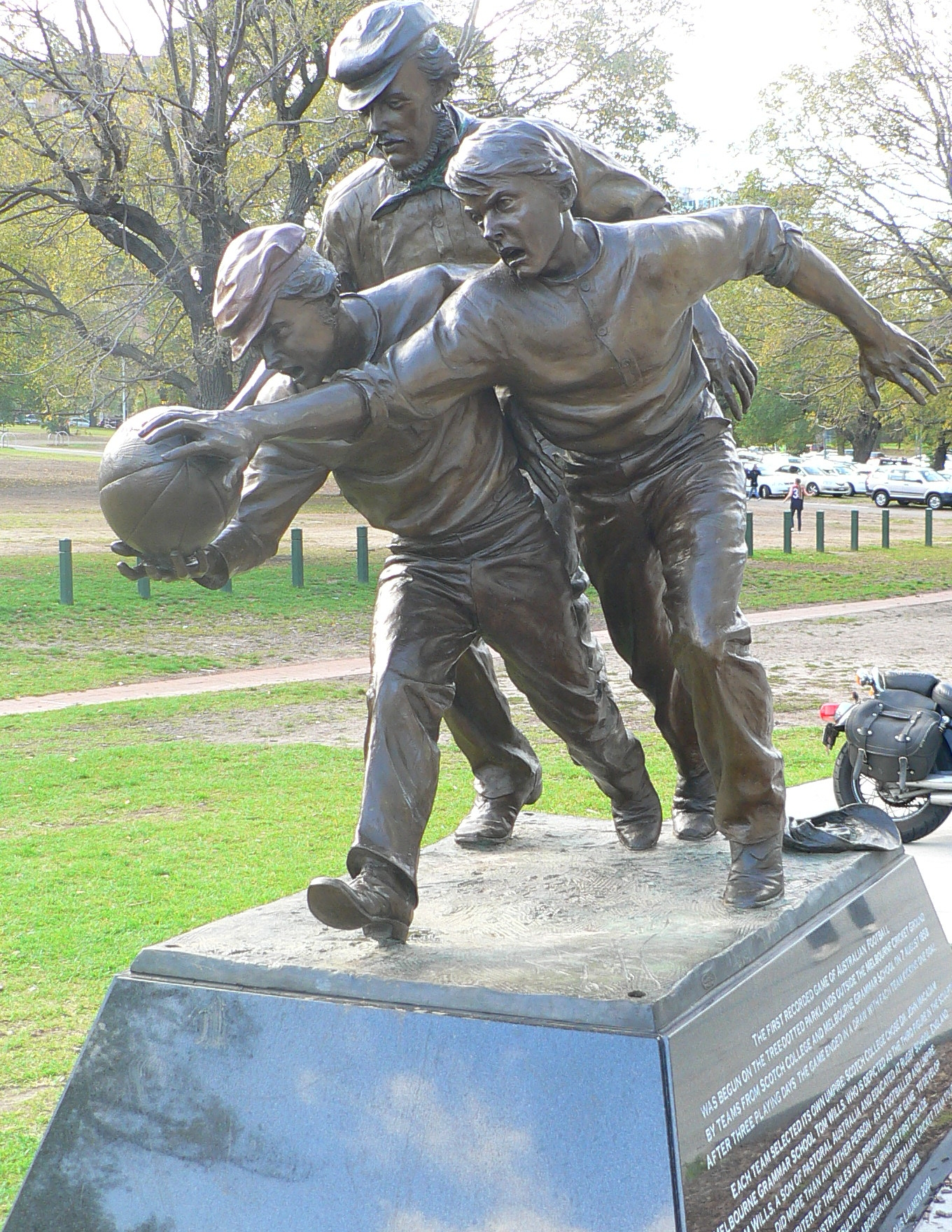
Statue of Tom Wills umpiring a football match in 1858, believed to be one of the defining moments in the history of Australian rules football

Australian rules football is a contact sport that originated in Melbourne, Victoria, Australia about 1858. The first documented match was played in 1858 between Melbourne Grammar School Football Club and Scotch College, and the earliest known rules were codified in 1859. The sport quickly grew in popularity, leading to the formation of early leagues such as the South Australian National Football League (originally called the South Australian Football Association), and the Victorian Football Association in 1877. By the early 20th century, it had become the dominant winter sport in several Australian states. In the 1990s, the Victorian Football League (VFL), evolved into the Australian Football League (AFL), which now serves as the sport's premier competition and governing body.

== Origins of the sport ==
The origins of Australian football before 1858 are still the subject of much debate, as there were a multitude of football games in Britain, Europe, Ireland and Australia whose rules influenced the early football games played in Victoria, which was at the time a British colony. Teams would have to agree before each match which rules would be followed, and different aspects of association football, Gaelic football, rugby football, Sheffield rules, Cambridge rules Winchester College football, Uppingham and Harrow football were apparent in the early games.

When the British came to Australia, they played informal organised football games on leisure days (e.g. public or festival holidays). When football games were played, it allowed different cultures and religious groups to join together. The Launceston-based Cornwall Chronicle in 1845 described servants playing football with a leg of mutton. As Australia developed, people found they had more leisure time. Often employment involved limited physical activity. There was little in the way of leisure activities for young men to amuse themselves apart from drinking alcohol. From 1847 there was a big push in society for the formation of sporting clubs and the establishment of organised public games in Port Phillip. The Gymnastic Games included organised football games and ran from 1850 until at least 1856. Many cricket clubs in Australia date from the 1850s, but there was also a need for a winter sport.

In April 1858 a new headmaster from Great Britain was hoping to introduce "manly" games to their students. Dr John Edward Bromby,(1809–1889) educated at Cambridge and the head master at Melbourne Church of England Grammar School joined forces with William C. Northcott of St. Kilda Grammar School. Together they agreed their schools should play a match of football at the beginning of the winter of 1858. This is the earliest football game on record between two Victorian schools or clubs. It took place on 5 June 1858 in St Kilda. St. Kilda Grammar won the match.

"Hard as nails – Jack Conway and the early days of football" list many of these boys from Melbourne Grammar who started playing in the winter of 1858 and how they contributed to shaping the game early on, in different clubs. Jack Conway when he went to Carlton introduced a new style of game which involved players kicking passing the ball to each other down the field. This may have been the turning point of the game, to remove it from "Rugby" style. This sped up the game and made it look more like the game we have today. It also helped Carlton become the premier club for a number of years.

In 1857 a book called Tom Brown's School Days by an Old Boy was published and became very popular and promoted football in Victorian schools. On 29 May 1858 the Argus published an article on the book, which got people talking. When Melbourne Football Club made their rules of 1858, they were inspired from this book.

A letter by Tom Wills was published in Bell's Life in Victoria & Sporting Chronicle on 10 July 1858, calling for a "foot-ball club, a rifle club, or other athletic pursuits" to keep cricketers fit during winter. The movement soon reached Tasmania, where in July 1859 the Hobart version of Bell's Life included a letter that similarly urged cricketers and cricket clubs to play winter football.

An experimental match organised by Mr James/Jerry Byrant was played at the Richmond Paddock (later known as Yarra Park next to the MCG) on 31 July 1858, very few details of the match have survived. Other matches were played 14 August 1858 and 28 August 1858 organised by MCC.

On 7 August 1858, a famous match between Melbourne Grammar School and Scotch College began, umpired by T. W. Wills and John Macadam. A second day of play took place on 21 August and a third and final day on 4 September. The two schools have competed annually ever since. However the two teams in 1858 were playing by agreed rules, which have not been recorded. The two schools have competed annually ever since. Thomas Henry Smith claimed H.C.A. Harrison, T. W. Wills' cousin and brother in-law was instrumental in developing the game but not in 1858.

== Development of the rules of Australian football ==
A history of the formation and development of Australian rules football was commissioned in 2009 by the MCC library in its journal, The Yorker. It outlines a great deal of information about early clubs, rules, matches and players. The development of football in Australia was influenced by its people and their prior exposure to ball sports through culture and experiences. Many playing football in 1858 had experiences of football from various places around the world, including the Aboriginal jumping game of Marngrook which had similar elements of the Irish game Caid.

On 14 May 1859, the Melbourne Football Club organised a game of football to start the new football season. The captains were a Mr Bryant and a Mr Smith. Owing to not enough MFC members turning up, others were allowed to play, some reported as Irish. After this game the players had two issues, spectators encroachment of the field and issues with the rules. There was one group who wanted to kick and catch the ball, others who did not want any hands used, other who want to hold the ball and run. The match captains and organisers recapped afterwards and thought Australia had men from different backgrounds and the rules of Rugby did not suit them. Australian football needed its own rules.

The answer was to ask the MCC if they could use their ground on the half holidays and have a meeting of the committee on 17 May to redraw up the rules of 1858 to suit their game better. Melbourne Football Club (MFC) rules of 1859 are the oldest surviving set of laws for Australian football. They were drawn up at the Parade Hotel East Melbourne on 17 May 1859 by the committee of MFC which included Thomas Wentworth Wills, William Hammersley, J. B. Thompson, Mr Bruce, Mr Wray, Mr Sewell and Thomas Smith (some sources erroneously include H. C. A. Harrison).

After the inter club match on 21 May 1859, the rules were further changed by the committee in regards to tripping. These amended rules were sent to the printers. The 1859 rules, drawn up three days after the Melbourne club was officially reformed, do not include some elements that soon became important to the game, such as the requirement to bounce the ball while running. On the public holiday on 24 May a game was played again with Melbourne members and others who turned up played a game using these new rules. T. W. Wills was playing cricket in Richmond and did not attend the match.

Melbourne's game was not immediately adopted by neighbouring clubs. In 1860, after changes and agreement from other clubs, the rules name was changed to "Victorian Rules of Football" and they were seen to be the official rules of most clubs in Victoria. In the 1858 season and later, if both clubs did not use the Victorian Rules each match was played by common rules agreed by the two teams involved. By 1866, however, several other clubs had agreed to play by an updated version of Melbourne rules.

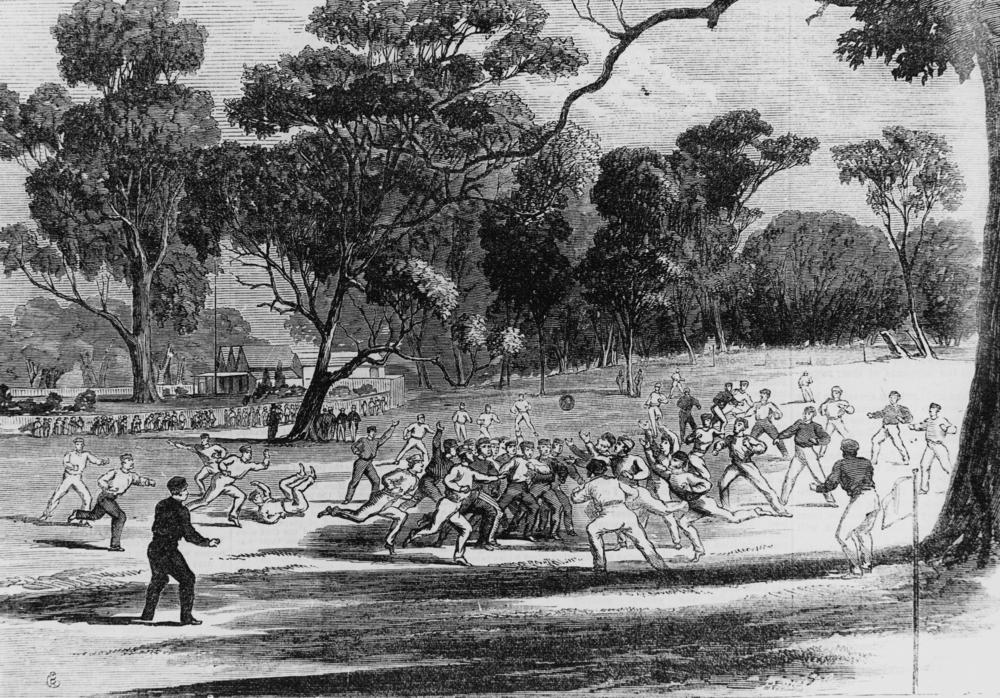
A game at the Richmond Paddock in the 1860s. A pavilion at the MCG is on the left in the background. (A wood engraving made by Robert Bruce on 27 July 1866.)

The original handwritten rules dated May 1859 were signed by Tom Wills, William Hammersley, J. Sewell, J. B. Thompson, Alex Bruce, T. Butterworth and Thomas Smith:

1 The distance between the goal post shall be decided upon by the captains of the sides playing.

2 The captains on each side shall toss for choice of goal. The side losing the toss has the kick-off from the centre-point between the goals.

3 A goal must be kicked fairly between the posts without touching either of them or a portion of the person of any player of either side.

4 The game shall be played within the space of not more than 200 yards wide, the same to be measured equally upon each side of the line drawn through the centre of the two goals and two posts to be called the kick-off points shall be erected at a distance of 20 yards on each side of the goal posts at both ends and in a straight line with them.

5 In case the ball is kicked behind the goals, anyone of the side behind whose goal it is kicked, may bring it back 20 yards in front of any portion of the space between the kick-off posts and shall kick it as nearly as possible in the line of the opposite goal.

6 Any player catching the ball directly from the boot may call 'mark'. He then has a free kick. No players from the opposite side being allowed to come into the spot marked.

7 Tripping and pushing are both allowed but no hacking when any player is in rapid motion or in possession of the ball except for the case provided by rule 6.

8 The ball may be taken in hand only when caught from the boot or on the hop. In no case shall it be lifted from the ground.

9 When the ball goes out of bounds (the same being indicated by a row of posts) it shall be brought back to the point where it crossed the boundary line and thrown in right angles with that line.

10 The ball while in play may under no circumstances be thrown.

These first rules had no restrictions on players running with the ball, nor did they set a minimum distance for a kick to secure a mark. T W Willis was not part of the rule changes of 1 July 1859, after a club match the Melbourne Football Club Committee change some of their rules. "

The committee of the club met subsequently at the Parade Hotel for the purpose of amending the existing rules, many of which have been found either insufficient or objectionable in practice."

The Committee of the M. F. C. met yesterday (1/7/1859) afternoon at the Parade Hotel, to reconsider the rules of the club. Mr. Bruce occupied the chair.

Rule III.

Proposed by Mr. SMITH, seconded by Mr.

THOMPSON, and carried, that the following be

substituted for the existing Rule 3: —

"A goal must be kicked fairly between the posts without touching either

of them, or any portion of the person of one of the opposite side.

In case of the ball being forced between the goal-posts in a scrimmage, a goal shall be awarded."

Rule VII.

Moved by Mr. THOMPSON, seconded by Mr, HAMMERSLEY, and carried:—

"Tripping, holding, and hacking are strictly prohibited. Pushing with the hands or body is allowed when any player is in rapid motion, or

in possession of the ball, except in the case pro-vided for in Rule VI."

Rule VIII.

Moved by Mr. Smith, seconded by Mr. Hammersley, and carried:—

"The ball may at any time be taken in hand, but not carried farther than is necessary for a kick."

Rule XI. (Additional.)

Proposed by Mr. THOMPSON, seconded by Mr. Butterworth, and carried:—

"In case of deliberate infringement of any of the above rules by either side, the captain of the opposite side may claim that any one of his party may have a free kick from the place where the breach of rule was made; the two captains in all cases, save where umpires are appointed, to be the sole judges of infringements."

It is believed the rule changes were made so other clubs (St Kilda and St Yarra) unhappy with the Melbourne Rules would play with them. They were further changed in order to have a match with South Yarra Football club on 9 July 1859. This may be the true start of the Melbourne football league, as it started an alliance between different clubs which came to compete against each other under common rules. Team list were published for this game. A follow up game occurred 23 July 1859, where a good report was written in papers afterwards.

In July 1859, J. B. Thompson, the secretary of the Melbourne Football Club, advised of the publication of The Victorian Cricketers Guide which was to contain football rules of the Melbourne and other clubs. It is believed this was edited by W Fairfax.

While the modern game is defined by its oval playing surface, the code was originally contested on rectangular rugby orientated fields, until the late 1870s when Victoria's prominent clubs began to play matches on enclosed cricket grounds, utilising the full dimensions available.

== Development of the game's first 10 years (1858–1867) ==
=== 1st season ===
The first season games were played using rules agreed upon on the day of the match. Each club formed had their rules of play and common agreed rules were used.

Schools were playing organised football in 1858 these are known to have been St Kilda Grammar, Melbourne Grammar and Scotch College.

The non-school teams recorded for the first season were Melbourne (1858–present) and South Yarra (1858–1873). These two clubs were the foundation clubs of Australian Rules Football in Victoria. The first documented match between clubs was in Richmond paddock on 25 September 1858 with 26 (or 27) players on each side. It is recorded in a letter to a paper St Kilda Football Club formed from members of the St Kilda Cricket Club in April 1858. The club matches in 1858 were held on the Richmond paddock and MCG.

=== 2nd season ===
The 1859 season had more teams form Brighton Park (School), Coast, Elsternwick, Hamilton, Melbourne, South Yarra, St Kilda, Emerald Hill, Prahran, University, Geelong and 40th Regiment. The game got a lot of interest, with many clubs forming. In villages around the colony there were many inter-club matches played. This season may be the true start of the Melbourne football league, as it started an alliance between different principal clubs who became to compete against each other under common rules. Team list were published on notice boards and in newspapers for games. Accounts show the Games were simple, rough and played for enjoyment. There was concern after a child was injured by Mr Wills, that children should not be joining in.

On 2 July 1859, Melbourne (MFC) changed their rules to remove tripping, hacking and holding so other clubs would play them. (T. W. Wills was not involved in this change.) Uniforms for teams were introduced. The match between Melbourne and South Yarra on 9 July 1959 was watched by over 2000 people. A follow up game occurred between South Yarra and Melbourne on 23 July 1859, where a good report was written in papers afterwards. After forming on 18 July, Geelong played its first inter club match also on 23 July. On 8 August there was a game between Melbourne and the best players of Emerald Hill and Prahran. another game between St Kilda and Melbourne was played on 13 August 1859. There were also calls for the police to attend matches to keep the spectators off the field, this continued to be a problem for decades to come.

The rules for football were being published in newspapers.

Generally clubs wanted rule changes to make the game less rough, as ripped shirts, injuries and fractures were occurring. Melbourne did not make all the changes as the game suited the style of some of their best players. They did not introduce all the rules the other clubs wanted. They introduced the 'no running with the ball', but this was ignored in most games.

=== 3rd season ===
Again there was an alliance of clubs with St Kilda Football Club calling for a meeting of all clubs to develop rules all games are played under. This meeting was held by players at the Argus Hotel on 28 May 1860. The purpose was to organizing general rules of play. The club represented:— Melbourne, St. Kilda, South Yarra, Richmond, Scotch College, University, Williamstown, Collingwood, and Boroondara. The current Melbourne rules were debated, there was an unsuccessful motion by South Yarra for a "push in the back rule". The rules adopted were printed and called " The Victorian Football Rules." which included all but one of the Melbourne rules. Geelong Football Club who could not attend the meeting was sent a copy of the rules for their approval. The game played well with new rule. Richmond football club formed from members of the Richmond Cricket Club. This club was Captained by H C Harrison and appeared to be part of Melbourne Football Club, so it did not appear they were playing inter-club scratch matches as often. Geelong players were reported as charging with their arms straight out in front and their fist closed as though they were entering a fight. They also played a game where they used their hands rather than kicking the ball.

=== 4th season ===
The football season of 1861 started in May and finished in September. On 5 June 1861 the annual meeting of club secretaries was held at the Bull and Mouth Hotel. This meeting was to arrange matches and discuss rules. The clubs were working together, however still not a league as there was no championship.

=== 5th season ===
The beginning of the 1862 season was troubled, it appeared some wanted to get rid of the rough, dirty and dangerous play and make it more gentile. The sphere and round balls were also an issue. Thompson moved away from Melbourne, Harrison moved to Geelong and was keen to get the season to start early, Geelong played its first match in March. T. W. Wills also is believed to return from his trip and joined Harrison at Geelong. They organised a match "Australians vs The world". In the papers there is reference to debate about the rules, which along with bad weather meant many games were cancelled Harrison the famous amateur runner wanted to be able to run with the ball. Many suburban and country cricket clubs had formed football clubs and were playing games. This drew away the big crowds to city matches, crowds in Ballarat were estimated at 800–1000. The annual meetings of secretaries of the several clubs was held at Marshall's Hotel mid May. The first city games did not happen until June.

This season saw the unsuccessful introduction of the Caledonian Challenge Cup. The Caledonian sports were held in December 1861 and a prize of a silver cup was to be awarded to the winner of the football match. Unfortunately due to a number of reasons the game did not come off as expected. The Caledonian society gave the cup to University Football Cup and it was agreed it was to be played for in the winter football season. Melbourne challenged University for the cup on a number of occasions, but University failed to turn up. In trying to advance the standard of football matches were played with players from clubs north of Yarra (North) and south of Yarra (South) The game recounts did not change much from other years, players were still running with the ball, there were some high leaping marks taken, kicking was highlighted more and the need for umpires was noted.

Bell's sport life advertised the printing of "Rules for Football at Uppingham School (1857)" which were simpler for clubs to follow than Rugby rules. The last match of the season took place in Geelong on 20 September a rematch of "Australians vs The World". Essendon Football Club appeared match reviews.

=== 6th season ===
Melbourne Football Club initially lost T. H. Smith from their committee. Geelong started the season on 25 April in the same way it was finished a rematch of "Australians vs The World." The season again started off slow in Melbourne, with many planned matches being scratched mainly due to weather The first club match was played between players from North and South on 30 May. This was the only match the members of South Yarra played in for the season Harrison appeared back on Melbourne team list in mid July. Melbourne challenged University again in order to try and win the Caledonian Challenge Cup. Games took place on 19, 9 July August and 22 August with Melbourne winning the cup. Geelong won the Cup from Melbourne 12 Aug. The game concluded the 1863 season. The parchment contained with the cup read;

"Football Challenge Cup, given by the Caledonian Society, Melbourne; won by University F. B. C.; Melbourne F. B. C.; and on 12 September 1863, by the Geelong F. B. C"

These matches were the starting of the league, as group of clubs were now playing over the season to win the cup. Playing for the cup put more interest in football. Oval fields needed to be marked out so players were not obstructed by spectators

=== 7th season ===
In 1864 fewer games were being recorded in the newspapers. Village football seemed to be strong and was being played socially. Inter-village football seemed to be occurring less. Football had lost a lot of its flair; it appears injuries and weather had affected it. A letter to a newspaper called for the game to be changed to remove running and charging and involve more kicks. This push was to change the game, from a rougher style to something closer to Rugby, which had been suggested at various times since 1859. As many games were scratched, as players did not turn up, it may have been the view of many that the game was too rough and dangerous. More bowls clubs started to form as an alternative to football. Young boys were taken by the fad of sling shotting. Hammersley, H. C Harrison and others formed a committee and ran athletic games on the MCG. Drop kicks reached 161 yards in competitions, it would have been measured from when the ball stopped rolling. At the end of the season Geelong still held the Challenge Cup after three unsuccessful attempts to win it from them. Geelong continued to organise the "Australians v World" games throughout the season. In Bell's life a series of article were published from the pages of The Field looked at how to amalgamate the school rules of Rugby, Eton, Harrow, Shrewsbury and Marlborough, and helped to create a united game.

=== 8th season ===
In 1865 there was a change in the direction of the game. Hammersley and his Athletics Committee donated a silver cup to be played for during the season. They acted as a governing body on games played for the cup and developed a set of rules on who can win it. It appears some clubs may not have been happy with this as University often disobeyed their rules. Cup matches saw the use of umpires, they sometimes may have been suffering from shortsightedness. A rule limiting players to one club for Challenge matches was also introduced but the matches seem to have players in them loaned by other clubs. It appears there may have been some tanking, to stop Melbourne or Geelong having a chance to win the cup. At the end of the season after passing through three clubs, Melbourne was holding the Challenge Cup. It was returned to the sporting committee to be used in the following season.

Melbourne Football club rule making meeting of 1865, T. W. Wills made an unsuccessful motion to have a cross bar put between the goal post. It was not passed due to the chairman saying one of the highlights of the game was a goal being scored by a player bringing the ball coming out of a skirmish. The motion of setting the game field to a maximum 200 yards by 100 yards also failed. There still seemed to be a few who continued to push the games stay similar to rugby. Running with the ball did not also seem to be stopped and Harrison still charged through the opposition with ball. There were many recorded games in the paper with descriptions. On 29 July 1865 Bell's sporting life did an article on how the game had progressed. From the weekly reviews publish in "Bell's Life in Victoria and Sporting Chronicle" you could see there were a lot more goals being gained from kicks 30–50 yards out from goals. Geelong again held games "Australians v World."

=== 9th season ===
The 1866 season came, the annual meeting of club secretaries occurred on 8 May 1866, where the rule had the first major change in six years. New rules on bouncing the ball, behind post, time limits to games and central umpires were introduced. After the change, running with the ball was still seen to be a problem in the game along with spectators approaching the ground. There were the usual disagreements often over goals. The Challenge Cup ran again and South Yarra claimed it at the end of season. Emerald Hill reformed under the name of South Melbourne Football Club. The game was getting more scientific and the aim of clubs playing was to win, but with not many goals being kicked many games were drawn.

=== 10th season ===
The 1867 season was the 10th season of football. The principal clubs continued to operate as an unaffiliated league. The game continued to grow and develop, but the players were still getting injured far too often due to rough play. The name of the South Melbourne team was changed back to Emerald Hill. Melbourne was the premier team. There were still disputes with umpires and games being stopped due to player withdrawal. This happened between a match of Carlton and South Melbourne on 5 July.

== Second decade of football (1868 -1877) ==
=== 11th season ===
1868 season continued to see the growth of the game and crowds, bad weather and disputes still stopped or cancelled games. Melbourne won the Challenge Cup. A review of the season and games played was written in The Australasian (Melbourne, Vic.: 1864–1946) on 3 Oct 1868 The principal teams were South Melbourne, Melbourne, South Yarra, Carlton, Geelong. Minor teams playing games mentioned were the army, Pentridge, Collingwood and Hobson Bay.

=== 12th season ===
1869 season. Emerald Hill seemed to change name this time to Albert Park. Melbourne again won the Challenge Cup. It was noted how the game was much different than that in England. "One great advantage all the players in and around Melbourne have is their possessing one code of rules and these not at all numerous and very easy of explanation." It was also agreed that the team that kicked the most goals won the game. 16 Oct 1869 in the end of season review in The Australasian "Fair play" suggest a fix to this system; " That when the ball is kicked six times behind its adversary's goal the side so kicking should score one goal and the game be recommenced as if a goal were kicked" It was not for at least ten years this suggest came into the rules of the game. Time limiting football matches seemed to be working well.

=== 13th season ===
The rule prohibiting one player from playing with more than one club in any of the Cup matches came in.

The Richmond paddock was improved, the ugly gully which used to run across the centre of the ground was filled up, and various protruding roots of trees removed, some unevenness removed. Melbourne believed they won the Cup, but Albert Park claimed it. After a ruling from the governing committee Albert Park gave back the Cup and refused to play for it again the next season. The changes in English football rules would be discussed to see if suited the Australian game.

=== 14th season ===
1871 season saw the unofficial association in full form. The league had different division teams, a tribunal, a ladder, common rules, fixtures and a grand final played for a cup. Carlton were the premium club, winning the Challenge Cup match against Melbourne. The Grand final was played on a neutral ground and had neutral umpires. The usual concerns of state of grounds, injuries, weather cancelling games and spectators on the field were reported in the papers. The delay in kicking a ball and holding on to it too long, which resulted in a brutal scrimmage was still the major rule issue. The game had grown in the community with an estimate of 20–25 teams playing each week. There was problems with goal umpires not knowing rules. Geelong supporters were again made out to be unfriendly to Melbourne teams. They appeared nice in their review of match. There was a dispute in the school's Lyon Cup which was sent to arbitration. The tribunal was four captains of the principal Football clubs and Mr Hammersley as the chair. The principal Melbourne clubs were Melbourne, Carlton, Albert Park and South Yarra.

The Australasia on 4 November published a letter, a rebuff to a letter J B Thompson had written in papers in reference to Wills' Cricketers Guide. It gave a really good view of the culture of sport in Victoria, something which has carried on for 150 years. It gave the impression the author could be related to the father of football, it may have been no one man but a group. The author played in the first games and quoted watching the writing of the rules in the back room of the Parade hotel. He supported the view of some that it was JB Thompson through his newspaper promoted football in the early days. He talks about the scars he had from football. He wanted the government to fix up the Richmond paddock for football, so it was fit for football. He believed football fields not being fenced was holding up the development of the game and spectators needed to be kept off the field. An interesting thing happened in Ballarat where the Cricket and Football clubs share the same ground and mainly the same committees. The cricket club wanted the football club to pay for the damage they did to the turf. As the repairer was a member of the football club, they believed he should repair the damage, he helped to do the turf. The account was not paid.

=== 15th season ===
1872 season saw Melbourne win the Challenge Cup. There were a number of clubs, which were rated in unofficial divisions. E.g. Principal, 2nd class, juniors, country etc. H C Harrison said he was retiring from playing football after playing nearly 15 years. Injuries from the previous season were still an issue and doctors advised him not to play. Other older players including Conway also retired, the newer players played a different game to the older ones.

South Yarra wanted to change some more rules. There were a number of rule changes made to sped up the game. A kick had to be obtained by the ball hitting the player on or below the knee. Goals could no longer be rushed/forced through, but needed to be kicked. The teams changed ends at half time. The field umpire had more duties like; settling disputes, doing a toss-up when scrimmages occurred or thrown in, if the ball went out of bounds between kick off post and boundary. The use of field umpires was improving the game.

A football club reformed in St Kilda and South Yarra also reformed putting a question of merger. South Yarra had lost players and junior players were playing in local junior clubs. Players could not commit and did little training and split into two trading camps one at South Yarra, the other St Kilda. A football club was reformed in St Kilda but could not play during the season as it had no ground to play on.

=== 16th season ===
1873 season started like the other recent seasons, however one of the foundation teams South Yarra did not last the full season. It was for a number of reasons; players going to other clubs, older players retiring and maybe problems within the committee, not wanting to officially merge with another club. Carlton again was the premium club. The new St Kilda Football Club first playing season was regarded by them as a brilliant success. In their first season they only played second class teams, with the inclusion of Albert Park.

There was still much debate in papers about the style of game and how rules needed to be enforced to improve it. Instances of slinging or throwing a player by holding when he did not have the ball, grabbing around the neck, were not being penalised. There was a strong call for umpires to penalise rule breaches and pay free kicks. Other things like "one player who is grabbing another with the ball round the neck or other part of the body", which is expressly allowed by the rules but should not be. The teams were looking good with distinctive uniforms.

One death occurred by reason of rough and quite unnecessary brutal force. The changes which St Kilda wanted in 1860 of not pushing in the back still had not been introduced. The old St Kilda and South Yarra team included many of the elite, who wanted a gentile game. It was noted many times these teams played games which were not as brutal as others. They did not want to turn up to work injured or looking like a punching bag, but they lost their battles and their teams. Many spectators loved the brutality and roughness of the game.

=== 17th season ===
With the older players gone, the 12 May 1874 annual meeting rule changes review saw scrimmages gone. The game was now much cleaner. Nth Melbourne and St Kilda joined the principal clubs, Melbourne, Geelong, Albert Park and Carlton. Carlton again was the premium club of the principal clubs. A lot of community football was being recorded in newspapers. The games still had central and goal umpires. The ball was still being kicked off from the centre of ground. The ball was being kicked and marked by players a lot more, a community game records a series of five kicks and marks from one end of field to the other to score a goal.. The game still contained a lot of fighting. Players were aware of injuries such as smashed knee-caps, concussions of the brain, broken shins, and other injuries; knowing these injuries could affect them for life, but did not stop them playing the game they loved.

=== 18th season ===
The 1875 season saw Carlton again become the premium club at the end of the season.

=== 19th season ===
1876 season. North Melbourne and Albert Park teams combined this season and played as one team. T. W. Wills was still umpiring school football.

=== 20th season ===
After 19 years of organised football in Victoria being run as an unofficial establishment since 1860, the Victoria Football Association was formed in 1877. The VFA replacing the loose affiliation of clubs that had been the hallmark of the early years of the game. It was a progressive move of the society of the time and marks the establishment of a unique Australian rules football code.. The first VFA rules explicitly mandated the use of a "No. 2 size Rugby ball" (a rugby union ball) measuring 26 inches in circumference. North Melbourne again was stand alone playing under the name of Hotham. Albert Park was an inaugural senior team of the VFA.

== History of clubs and competitions ==
=== Historic clubs ===
The modern day Australian Football League (AFL) includes many teams that date back to the beginnings of the game. Apart from the Melbourne FC (1859) other early clubs still in existence in the AFL include: Geelong (1859), Carlton (1864), North Melbourne (aka Hotham) (1869), Port Adelaide (1870), Essendon (1872), St Kilda (1873), South Melbourne (now Sydney Swans) (1874), and Footscray (now the Western Bulldogs) (1877).

Other historic clubs such as Castlemaine (1859) and Melbourne University (1859) also continue to exist in lesser leagues.

St Kilda Football Club was established in April 1858 and played for a number of seasons until they no longer had a ground in 1864. In 1872 when a new ground was found it was reformed. Many of the players from St Kilda in 1865 then played for the South Yarra Football Club (1858). In April 1872 there was a motion to join both clubs.

=== First leagues ===
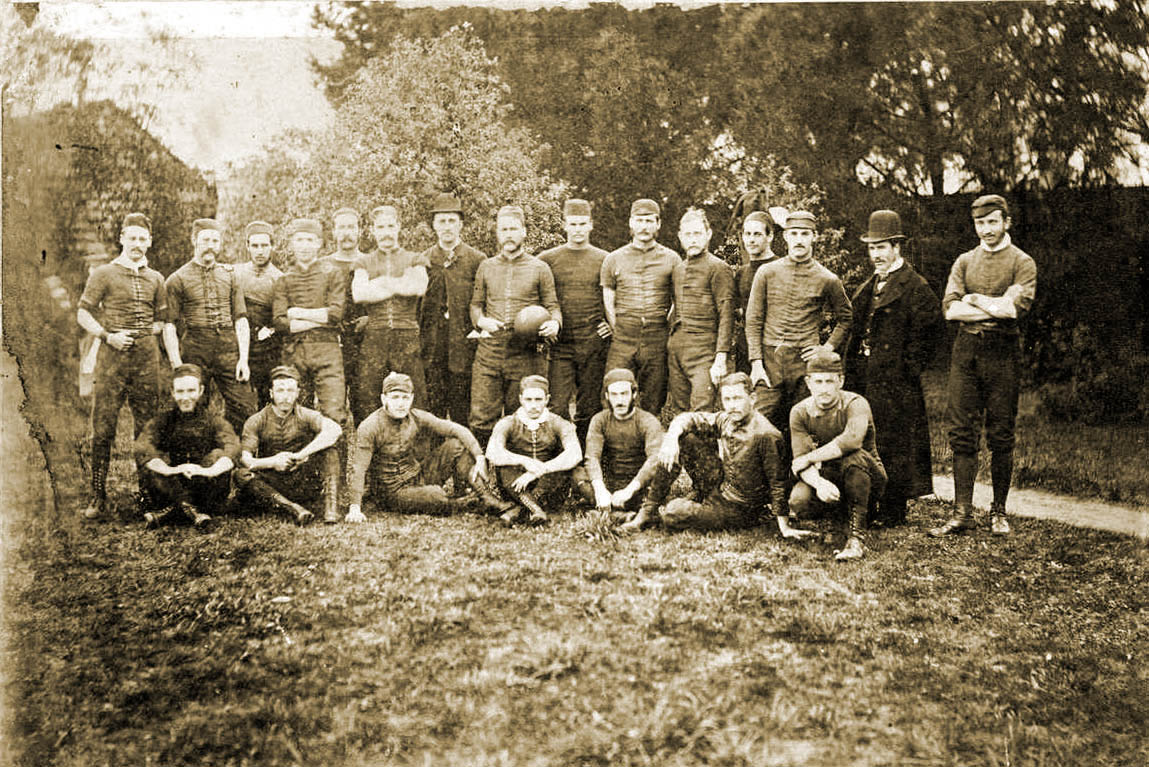
Melbourne FC team of 1879

In 1877, the South Australian Football Association (SAFA) was formed followed by the Victorian Football Association (VFA) three days later. The VFA was formed by Albert Park, Ballarat, Barwon, Beechworth, Carlton, Castlemaine, East Melbourne, Essendon, Geelong, Hotham (later North Melbourne), Inglewood, Melbourne, Rochester and St Kilda. Six of these clubs were from the Victorian country. At the time, Essendon was regarded as a semi-junior club rather than a full member and was allowed concessions such as fielding teams of 25 players instead of the standard 20.

The first night football match in Australia occurred on 5 August 1879, at the Melbourne Cricket Ground, between two teams of 20 men, from Collingwood Rifles and East Melbourne Artillery. A second match, between two teams of 16 men from Carlton Football Club and Melbourne Football Club was played at the MCG a week later. The lighting (from batteries) was more successful than it had been at the first match.

==== Australian first leagues and participating clubs ====
SAFA (1877)
Adelaide
Bankers
Kensington
Port Adelaide
South Adelaide
South Park
Victorian
Woodville

VFA (1877)
Albert Park
Carlton
Hotham
Melbourne
St Kilda

TFL (1879)
City
Cricketers
High School
Hutchins
Newtown
Railway
Richmond

WAFL (1885)
Fremantle
Hale School
Rovers
Victorian

=== Clubs outside Victoria ===
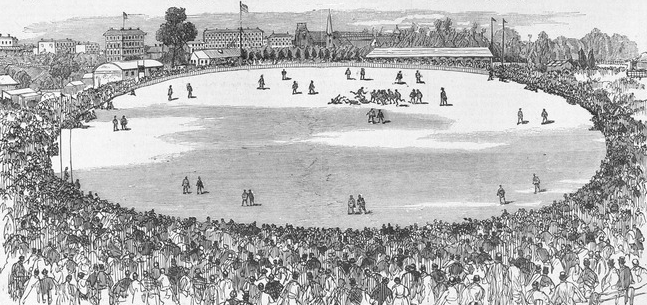
Engraving of the first intercolonial football match between Victoria and South Australia at the East Melbourne Cricket Ground, 1879

Within a year of the Melbourne rules football system being developed, it began to spread into football clubs in other British colonies, beginning with South Australia (1860), Tasmania (1864), Queensland (1866), New South Wales (1877), New Zealand (1868) and Western Australia (1881). By 1916 the game was first played in the Northern Territory, establishing a permanent presence in all Australian states and mainland territories.

In Newcastle, New South Wales the Black Diamond league was founded by Victorian goldminers and the Black Diamond Challenge Cup remains Australia's oldest sporting trophy.

The first intercolonial match was held between Victoria and South Australia in 1879.

Factors such as intercolonial (and later interstate) rivalry and the denial of access to grounds in Sydney by the dominant rugby codes caused the code to struggle in New South Wales and Queensland.

=== Formation of the VFL ===
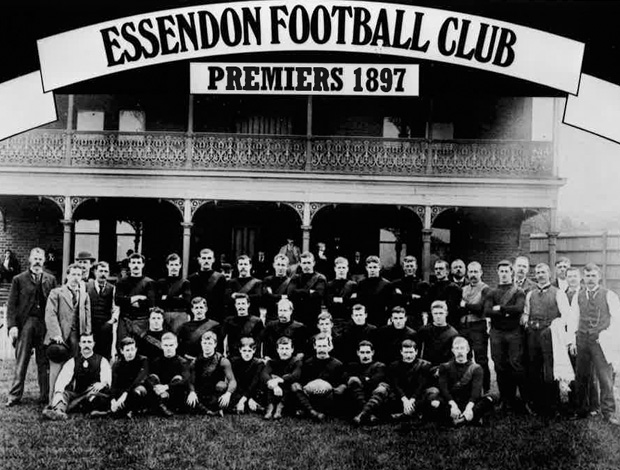
Essendon, first VFL premiers in 1897

A rift in the VFA led to the formation of the Victorian Football League (VFL), which commenced play in 1897 as an eight-team breakaway of the stronger clubs in the VFA competition: Carlton, Collingwood, Essendon, Fitzroy, Geelong, Melbourne, St Kilda and South Melbourne. The first season concluded with Essendon finishing as the premiers (winners).

Another five VFA clubs joined the VFL later: Richmond and University joined the VFL in 1908, although University withdrew in 1915 due to the war. Footscray, Hawthorn and North Melbourne joined in 1925, by which time VFL had become the most prominent league in the game.

=== Interstate competition ===
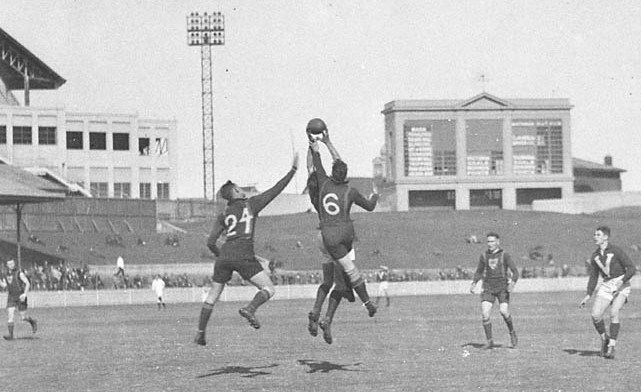
Players contest a mark at the 1933 Australian Football Carnival at the Sydney Cricket Ground. The teams are Victoria and Tasmania. (Photographer: Sam Hood.)

For most of the 20th century, the absence of a national club competition – and the inability of players to compete internationally – meant that matches between state representative teams were regarded with great importance. The first intercolonial match was first played in 1879 between Victoria and South Australia. VFL clubs increasingly recruited the best players in other states, one of the reasons Victoria dominated these games. However, State of Origin rules were introduced in 1977, and in the first such game, at Subiaco Oval in Perth, Western Australia defeated Victoria, 23.13 (151) to 8.9 (57), a huge reversal of the results in most previous games. Western Australia and South Australia began to win a lot more of their games against Victoria. However, during the 1990s, following the emergence of the Australian Football League and the game becoming full professional State of Origin games declined in importance especially after an increasing number of withdrawals who were under increasing pressure from clubs concerned by the risk of injuries. Australian football State of Origin matches ceased in 1999. The second-tier state and territorial leagues still contest interstate matches.

=== A national league ===
In 1982, in a move which heralded big changes within the sport, one of the original VFL clubs South Melbourne Football Club relocated to the rugby league stronghold of Sydney and became known as the Sydney Swans. In the late 1980s strong interstate interest in the VFL led to a more national competition; two more non-Victorian clubs, the West Coast Eagles and the Brisbane Bears began playing in 1987.

The league changed its name to the Australian Football League (AFL) following the 1989 season. In 1991, it gained its first South Australian team, Adelaide. West Coast's local derby rival Fremantle was admitted in 1995. The Fitzroy Lions merged with Brisbane Bears after 1996 due to financial difficulties to form the Brisbane Lions and the proud old SANFL club, Port Adelaide joined in 1997 as Port Adelaide Power, immediately becoming fierce local rivals to Adelaide. In 2011 The Gold Coast Suns were admitted into the league followed by the Greater Western Sydney Giants (GWS) in 2012. The AFL, currently with 18 member clubs, is the sport's elite competition and the most powerful body in the world of Australian rules football.

=== Today's state leagues ===
For much of the 20th century, the SANFL and the WAFL were considered peers of the VFL. Although the VFL was generally accepted as the strongest league, they frequently played each other on an even footing in challenge matches and occasional nationwide club competitions. The other states and territories also infrequently participated in interstate matches when they were able to field a strong side.

With the introduction of the AFL the VFL, SANFL, WAFL and other state leagues rapidly declined to a secondary status. Apart from these there are many semi-professional and amateur leagues around Australia, where they play a very important role in the community, and particularly so in rural areas.

The VFA, still in existence a century after the original schism, merged with the former VFL reserves competition in 1998. The new entity adopted the VFL name.

=== Australian football internationally ===
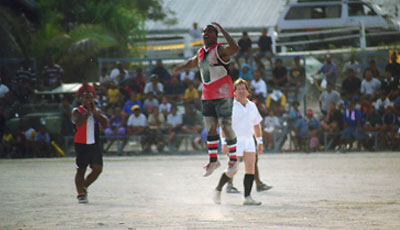
Action from an Aussie Rules game in Nauru at the Linkbelt Oval

Almost as soon as the game was becoming established in Australia, it had spread to New Zealand in 1878. South Africa followed in the 1880s, with the help of Australian goldminers; they were augmented by soldiers during the Second Boer War.

In 1888, a touring British rugby team played 19 games of Australian rules against clubs in Tasmania, Victoria and South Australia. The tourists, who had been hastily trained in the local code, played Carlton in front of 25,000 people – a substantial crowd at the time – in their first game. They even had a win over Port Adelaide. However, the tourists returned to rugby once they left Australia and the foundation of Australian rules clubs overseas was still many years away.

As the game spread to New Zealand the national governing body the Australian Football Council became known as the Australasian Football Council then changed back after the game declined in popularity in New Zealand.

In 1908, New Zealand was home to a formidable league of 115 clubs, and their national team defeated both New South Wales and Queensland at the Jubilee Australasian Football Carnival, an event held to celebrate 50 years of Australian Football. The game was also introduced to England, Scotland and Japan. The profound effects of World War I caused the gradual demise in the game in countries outside Australia, including New Zealand.

The first nation outside of Australia to take the sport up seriously was the former Australian territory of Nauru, which began playing in the 1930s. The game is now the national sport of the country. Another former territory, Papua New Guinea began playing in the 1950s. For a time at least, it was the most popular sport in the country, and still remains popular. New Zealand resumed a local competition in 1974.

The first ever international match involving Australia was played in 1977 at under 17 level between Australia and Papua New Guinea in Adelaide, with Australia taking the honours . Since then, Australia have been peerless in the sport and seldom compete at international level.

In the late 1980s, as distance became less of an obstacle, amateur teams were established in Japan (1987) and England, Denmark and Canada (1989). In the 1990s, amateur competition has grown in countries such as Sweden (1993), Germany (1995), USA (1996), Argentina, Spain and Samoa (1997), South Africa (1998), as well as a number of solely expatriate teams, mainly based in South East Asia.

Since 2000, fledgling competitions have been established in countries such as Ireland (2000), Tonga (2002), Scotland, France and China (2005), Pakistan, Indonesia (2006), Catalonia, Norway and East Timor. Many of these were initially established by Australian expatriates but collecting growing numbers of native players. In other countries, it grew out of AFL exhibition matches, cult television following or Internet communication. North American fans formed an organization, AFANA, specifically to work for improved media coverage of Australian football.

Since the 1990s, the AFL and other development bodies have contributed to the development the game overseas. There are now youth development programs in several of these countries; since 1998, the Barassi International Australian Football Youth Tournament, endorsed by the AFL as part of its International Policy, has hosted several of junior teams from other countries.

The Arafura Games, held in Darwin, Northern Territory, Australia is a Multi-sport event for South East Asia and East Asian island nations, northern Australia and the Pacific Islands which has Australian football as a permanent competition sport, rather than a demonstration sport. Papua New Guinea won the gold medal and retained it in subsequent games. Other teams that have competed at Australian Rules in the games include Japan, Nauru and a Northern Territory indigenous team.

The International Australian Football Council (IAFC) was formed after the 1995 Arafura Games. Following internal divisions in the IAFC, another organization, Aussie Rules International was set up in London. The AFL did not recognise the IAFC as anything more than a promotional body, and is itself considered the keeper of the code. Hence the AFL is primarily responsible for funding and governance and provides around A$500,000 annually for international development, especially junior programs. The code is not large enough outside Australia for an international governing body made up of national bodies.

Inspired by successful Arafura Games competitions, the inaugural Australian Football International Cup was held in Melbourne in 2002, an initiative of the IAFC and the AFL. With the closure of the IAFC subsequent cups are staged by the AFL. The 2002 cup was contested by 11 teams from around the world made up exclusively of non-Australians. Ireland won the 2002 cup, defeating Papua New Guinea in the final. (See also: Australian football leagues outside Australia.)

Today, Australian football is a major spectator sport in Australia and Nauru, although occasional exhibition games are staged in other countries. Some local grand final and carnival type events in Papua New Guinea, Nauru, England and the United States have occasionally drawn attendances that number in the thousands.

On 3 July 2006 the AFL announced that it had formed an International Development Committee to support overseas (non-Australian) football leagues. The AFL also hope to develop the game in other countries to the point where Australian football is played at an international level by top-quality sides from around the world. The AFL has hosted an International Cup regularly every three years, beginning in 2002, with the third game in 2008 corresponding to the 150th anniversary of the code.

==== International rules football ====
Since 1967, there have been many matches between Australian and Irish teams, under various sets of hybrid, compromise rules drawn from both Australian and Gaelic football. The current rules use the round ball and the rectangular field and cross-bar posts of Gaelic football. The fierce tackling and marking of the Australian code is allowed.

In 1984, the first official representative matches of International Rules football were played, and these are now played annually each October.

In 1999, a record Australian International Rules crowd of 65,000 at the MCG attended a game that saw Ireland defeat Australia but Australia win the series. In 2002, a record Irish International Rules crowd of 71,532 at Croke Park, Dublin witnessed a draw which also saw Australia win the series.
