= Marn Grook =

Indigenous Australian football game

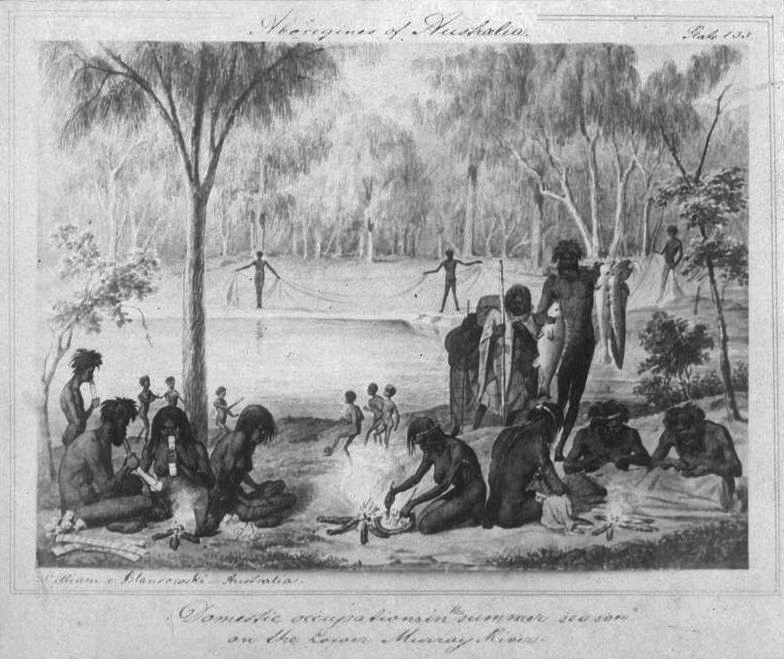
Australian Aboriginal domestic scene depicting traditional recreation, including one child kicking the ball, with the object and caption being to "never let the ball hit the ground". (From William Blandowski's Australien in 142 Photographischen Abbildungen, 1857, (Haddon Library, Faculty of Archaeology and Anthropology, Cambridge)

Marn Grook, marn-grook or marngrook (also spelt Marn Gook) is the popular collective name for traditional Indigenous Australian football games played at gatherings and celebrations by sometimes more than 100 players. From the Woiwurung language of the Kulin people, it means "ball" and "game".

These games featured punt kicking and catching a stuffed ball. They involved large numbers of players, and were played over an extremely large area. The game was subject to strict behavioural protocols: for instance all players had to be matched for size, gender and skin group relationship. However, to outside observers the game appeared to lack a team objective, having no real rules or scoring system. A winner could only be declared if one of the sides agreed that the other side had played better. Individual players who consistently exhibited outstanding skills, such as kicking or leaping higher than others to catch the ball, were often praised, but proficiency in the sport gave them no tribal influence.

The earliest accounts emerged decades after the European settlement of Australia, mostly from the colonial Victorian explorers and settlers. Historical reports support it as a widespread activity across south-eastern Australia of the Djabwurrung and Jardwadjali people and other tribes in the Wimmera, Mallee and Millewa regions of western Victoria. According to some accounts, the range extended to the Wurundjeri in the Yarra Valley, the Gunai people of Gippsland, and the Riverina in south-western New South Wales. The Warlpiri people of Central Australia played a very similar kicking and catching game with a possum skin ball, and the game was known as pultja. North of Brisbane in Queensland in the 1860s it was known as Purru Purru.

Some historians claim that Marn Grook had a role in the formation of Australian rules football, which originated in Melbourne in 1858 and was codified the following year by members of the Melbourne Football Club. This connection has become culturally important to many Indigenous Australians, including celebrities and professional footballers from communities in which Australian rules football is highly popular.

== Early accounts ==
Although the consensus among historians is that Marn Grook existed before European arrival, it is not clear how long the game had been played in Victoria or elsewhere on the Australian continent.

A news article published in 1906 suggests that it had been observed around a century prior, which would put its first observations to Australia's earliest days as a convict colony.

The earliest recorded anecdotal account is from about 1841, a decade prior to the Victorian gold rush. Robert Brough Smyth in his 1878 book, The Aborigines of Victoria, quoted William Thomas, a Protector of Aborigines in Victoria, who stated that he had witnessed Wurundjeri Aboriginal people east of Melbourne playing the game:

The men and boys joyfully assemble when this game is to be played. One makes a ball of possum skin, somewhat elastic, but firm and strong. ...The players of this game do not throw the ball as a white man might do, but drop it and at the same time kicks it with his foot, using the instep for that purpose. ...The tallest men have the best chances in this game. ...Some of them will leap as high as five feet from the ground to catch the ball. The person who secures the ball kicks it. ...This continues for hours and the natives never seem to tire of the exercise.

The game was a favourite of the Wurundjeri-willam clan and the two teams were sometimes based on the traditional totemic moieties of Bunjil (eagle) and Waang (crow). Robert Brough-Smyth saw the game played at Coranderrk Mission Station, where ngurungaeta (elder) William Barak discouraged the playing of imported games like cricket and encouraged the traditional native game of marn grook.

1855 illustration by William Anderson Cawthorne of Indigenous playthings from South Australia including a ball, referred to as pando in the Kaurna language.

In 1855 William Anderson Cawthorne documented South Australia's indigenous Adelaide Plains people. He produced a series of illustrations: one image was of a pair of playthings, a sling and a ball. In the Kaurna language a ball is a pando or parndo.

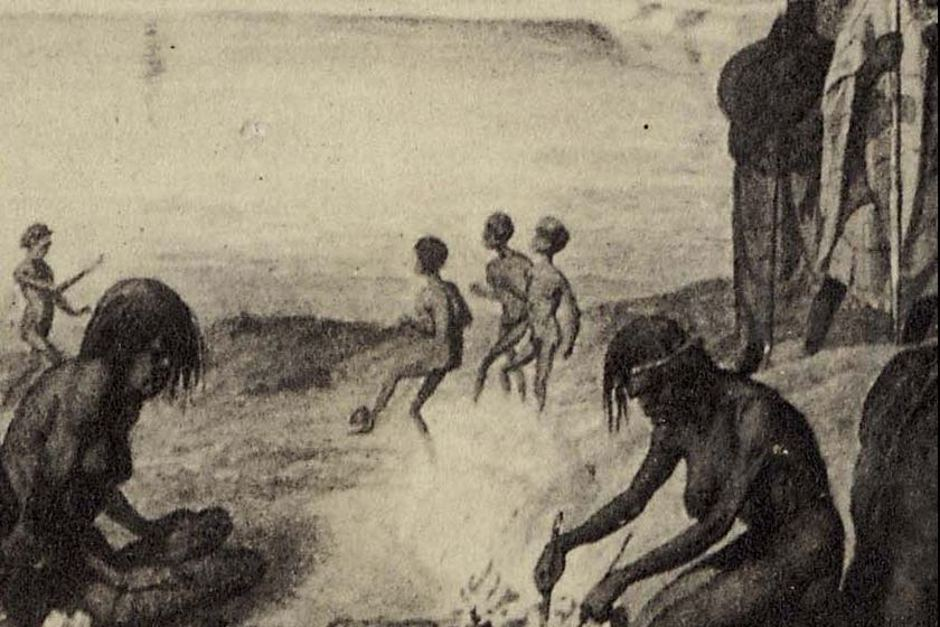
Marn Grook (detail)

An 1857 sketch found in 2007 describes an observation by Victorian scientist William Blandowski, of the Latjilatji people playing a football game near Merbein, on his expedition to the junction of the Murray and Darling Rivers.

The image is inscribed:

A group of children is playing with a ball. The ball is made out of typha roots (roots of the bulrush). It is not thrown or hit with a bat, but is kicked up in the air with a foot. The aim of the game – never let the ball touch the ground.

In relation to the 1857 sketch, Historian Greg de Moore commented:

What I can say for certain is that it's the first image of any kind of football that's been discovered in Australia. It pre-dates the first European images of any kind of football, by almost ten years in Australia. Whether or not there is a link between the two games in some way for me is immaterial because it really highlights that games such as Marn Grook, which is one of the names for Aboriginal football, were played by Aborigines and should be celebrated in their own right

An 1860 eyewitness account of an Aboriginal colony (likely the Taungurung) from the Broken River (between the current cities of Shepparton and Benalla) describes a "great game of football" which inaugurated festivities.

James Dawson, in his 1881 book titled Australian Aborigines, described a game, which he referred to as 'football', where the players of two teams kick around a ball made of possum fur.

Each side endeavours to keep possession of the ball, which is tossed a short distance by hand, then kicked in any direction. The side which kicks it oftenest and furthest gains the game. The person who sends it the highest is considered the best player, and has the honour of burying it in the ground till required the next day. The sport is concluded with a shout of applause, and the best player is complimented on his skill. The game, which is somewhat similar to the white man's game of football, is very rough...

— James Dawson in his 1881 book Australian Aborigines.

In the appendix of Dawson's book, he lists the word Min'gorm for the game in the Aboriginal language Chaap Wuurong.

In 1889, anthropologist Alfred Howitt, wrote that the game was played between large groups on a totemic basis – the white cockatoos versus the black cockatoos, for example, which accorded with their skin system. Acclaim and recognition went to the players who could leap or kick the highest. Howitt wrote:

This game of ball-playing was also practised among the Kurnai, the Wolgal (Tumut river people), the Wotjoballuk as well as by the Woiworung, and was probably known to most tribes of south-eastern Australia. The Kurnai made the ball from the scrotum of an "old man kangaroo", the Woiworung made it of tightly rolled up pieces of possum skin. It was called by them "mangurt". In this tribe the two exogamous divisions, Bunjil and Waa, played on opposite sides. The Wotjoballuk also played this game, with Krokitch on one side and Gamutch on the other. The mangurt was sent as a token of friendship from one to another.

According to Howitt's historical field notes published in 1907 held in the AIATSIS Collection, an account from a Mukjarawaint man from the Grampians indicated that both men and women would play in the same teams. This is further supported by an account from Beveridge from 1885.

In 1929 David Uniapon, during a discussion about Harry Hewitt that appeared in the Adelaide Observer, stated that "an ancient game was played by my people with a ball about the size of a cricket ball, made of hair and emu feathers. Sides were chosen, and the ball was passed from one to the other, the idea being to keep it in possession of those on one side, and not to let their rivals secure it."

By 1906, the name Marn Grook had entered the lexicon, several articles in newspapers of the time describe it as a near extinct pastime and provide details on the size (about 6 inches) of the ball.

Another anecdotal account of Marn Grook being played near Melbourne from 1934 describes some of the rules of the game, including the highest kicker winning the game, that it was educated by the elders and that girls also played but threw instead of kicked the ball.

== Relationship with Australian rules football ==
=== Tom Wills Link ===
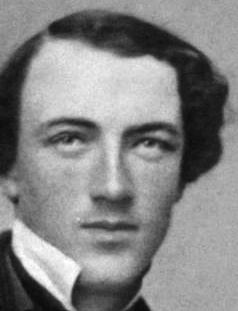
Australian football pioneer Tom Wills grew up as the only white child among Djab wurrung Aborigines in Western Victoria

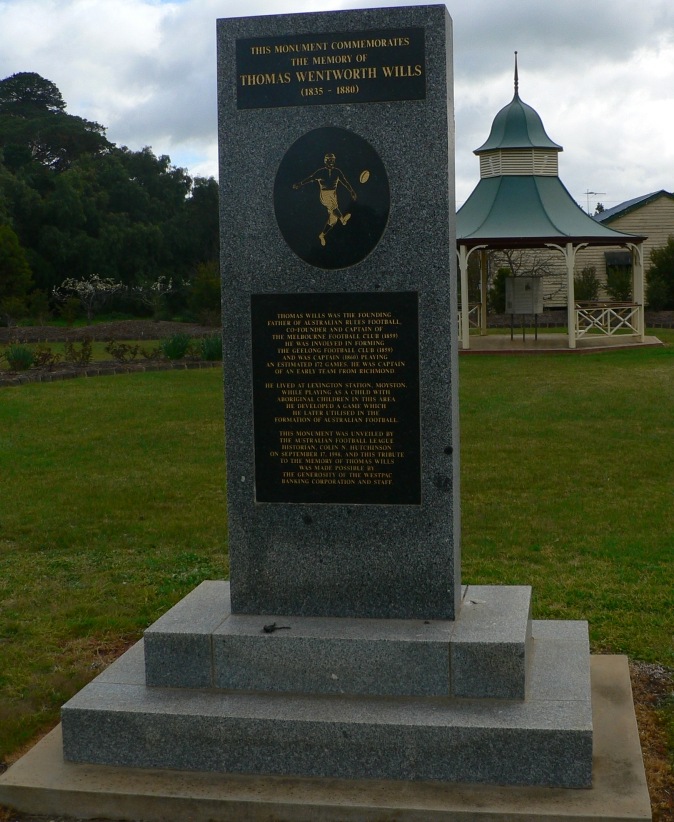
Tom Wills monument in Moyston makes a claim to the Marn Grook connection

Since the 1980s, some commentators, including Martin Flanagan, Jim Poulter and Col Hutchinson have postulated that Australian rules football pioneer Tom Wills could have been inspired by Marn Grook.

The theory hinges on evidence which is circumstantial and anecdotal. Tom Wills was raised in Victoria's Western District. As the only white child in the district, it is said that he was fluent in the languages of the Djab wurrung and frequently played with local Aboriginal children on his father's property, Lexington, outside modern-day Moyston. This story has been passed down through the generations of his family.

Col Hutchison, former historian for the AFL, wrote in support of the theory postulated by Flanagan, and his account appears on an official AFL memorial to Tom Wills in Moyston, erected in 1998.

While playing as a child with Aboriginal children in this area [Moyston] he [Tom Wills] developed a game which he later utilised in the formation of Australian Football.

— As written by Col Hutchison on the plaque at Moyston donated by the Australian Football League in 1998.

Sports historian Gillian Hibbins—who researched the origins of Australian rules football for the Australian Football League's official account of the game's history as part of its 150th anniversary celebrations—sternly rejects the theory, stating that while Marn Grook was "definitely" played around Port Fairy and throughout the Melbourne area, there is no evidence that the game was played north of the Grampians or by the Djabwurrung people, and the claim that Wills observed and possibly played the game is improbable. Hibbin's account was widely publicised causing significant controversy and offending prominent Indigenous footballers who openly criticised the publication.

Professor Jenny Hocking of Monash University and Nell Reidy have also published eyewitness accounts of the game having been played in the area in which Tom Wills grew up.

In his exhaustive research of the first four decades of Australian rules football, historian Mark Pennings "could not find evidence that those who wrote the first rules were influenced by the Indigenous game of Marngrook". Melbourne Cricket Club researcher Trevor Ruddell wrote in 2013 that Marn Grook "has no causal link with, nor any documented influence upon, the early development of Australian football."

Chris Hallinan and Barry Judd describe the historical perspective of the history of Australian Rules as Anglo-centric, having been reluctant to acknowledge the Indigenous contribution. They go on to suggest this is an example of white Australians struggling to accept Indigenous peoples "as active and intelligent human subjects".

If Tom Wills had have said "Hey, we should have a game of our own more like the football the black fellas play" it would have killed it stone dead before it was even born.

— Statement by Jim Poulter During 7.30 Report (22 May 2008).

=== Comparisons with Australian rules football ===
Advocates of these theories have drawn comparisons in the catching of the kicked ball (the mark) and the high jumping to catch the ball (the spectacular mark) that have been attributes of both games. The AFL stated in 2019 of the Australian rules football code: "It is Australia’s only Indigenous football game – a game born from the ancient traditions of our country." However, the connection is speculative. For instance punt kicking and spectacular high marking did not become common in Australian rules football until the 1880s.

=== Marn Grook and the Australian rules football term "mark" ===
Some claim that the origin of the Australian rules term mark, meaning a clean, fair catch of a kicked ball, followed by a free kick, is the Aboriginal word mumarki used in Marn Grook, and meaning "to catch". The application of the word "mark" in "foot-ball" (and in many other games) dates to the Elizabethan era and is likely derived from the practice where a player marks the ground to show where a catch had been taken or where the ball should be placed.The use of the word "mark" to indicate an "impression or trace forming a sign" on the ground dates to c. 1200.

== See also ==
- Origins of Australian rules football
- Medieval football
- Lacrosse
- Lelo burti
- Yubi lakpi
- Woggabaliri
