= Caid (sport) =

Various ancient and traditional Irish football games

Caid (Irish pronunciation: [kadʲ], meaning "stuffed ball") is a collective name used in reference to various ancient and traditional Irish mob football games. The word caid originally referred to the ball which was used. It was made out of animal skin, with a natural bladder inside.

The sport may have been taken around the world by the Irish diaspora. Caid is believed by some to be connected to the modern sport of Gaelic football, the rules of which were officially first written in 1885 and is now organised and governed by the Gaelic Athletic Association (GAA) as an amateur sport. Most Irish historians, however, reject such a connection. It being the basis for Australian football is also disputed.

== History ==
The first recorded mention of football in Ireland was in 1308, when John McCrocan, a spectator at a football game at Newcastle, County Dublin, was charged with accidentally stabbing a player named William Bernard. Football games are mentioned in the Statute of Galway, 1527, which allowed the playing of football and archery, but banned "'hokie' — the hurling of a little ball with sticks or staves", as well as other sports. The Sunday Observance Act of 1695 imposed a fine of one shilling for anyone found playing. Despite this, the earliest recorded football match in Ireland was one between Louth and Meath, at Slane, in 1712.

Caid was especially popular in rural areas, such as the Dingle Peninsula of Kerry and Eigeen in west Cork. One observer in the mid-19th century, Father W. Ferris, described two main forms of caid during this period: the "field game" in which the object was to put the ball through arch-like goals, formed from the boughs of two trees, and; the epic "cross-country game" which took up most of the daylight hours of a Sunday on which it was played, and was won by one team taking the ball across a parish boundary. Both of these were rough and tumble contact sports in which "wrestling", pushing, and the holding of opposing players was allowed. It was usually played by teams of unlimited numbers, representing communities, until a clear result was achieved or the players became too exhausted to continue.

These games appear to have been similar to the traditional Welsh game of cnapan, which was played by teams of up to 1,000 men from adjacent parishes. Cnapan, however, was played with a hard ball and thus involved no kicking; it was strictly a game in which the ball was passed or smuggled from one player to another, with the object of getting it to the opposing team's parish church porch or to some other agreed destination. An inter-parish mob football game similar to cnapan called Hyrlîan (In English Hurling) is still played in Cornwall on dates that coincide with religious festivals such as Shrove Tuesday.

== Connection to Australian football ==
It was a popular assumption in the late 1980s that Irish football is the basis for Australian football, and this was based primarily on the premise that Ireland is older than Australia and the two games look similar. B. W. O'Dwyer and Richard Davis have used correlation between Gaelic football and Australian rules football to infer that caid played some part in the origins of Australian rules football. Such a connection was first debunked by Leonie Sandercock and Ian Turner; however, the first thorough investigation into a link was conducted by Geoffrey Blainey in 1989, concluding that it was nothing more than a myth. Subsequent historians have cited questionable cause as a reason for the assumption, though contemporary historians are suggesting reverse causation as a possible scenario.

Nevertheless, the relationship of Irish football to Australian football and a hypothetical role in the Origins of Australian rules football remains the subject of debate. While there are some mentions of Irish playing football in Australia (English and Scottish foot-ball were far more common) prior to the formation of the Melbourne Football Club, there is no specific mention of either "caid", "Irish football" or "Gaelic football" in Australian newspapers of the time. There certainly is reference to Caid being played in Australia as early as 1843 in Adelaide, where Foot-Ball in its Australian sense began to develop through the 1840s and 1850s under a variety of rules; being "Adelaide Rules", "Harrow Rules", "Kensington Rules" amongst others, all these Foot-Ball games were played with remarkably similar style, look and rule sets that would eventually become "Victorian Rules" or actual codification of rules to a game that was well in existence in Adelaide from the 1840s.

The first recorded game of "football" in South Australia was an Irish game called "caid". Some believe that this game was an early form of Gaelic Football. The game was played in Thebarton by people of the local Irish community in 1843 to celebrate St Patrick's Day. The Southern Australian had an advert promoting the game. The earliest mention from an Irish source in Australia in 1889 was that the old mob football had very little in common with modern Gaelic football which upon first appearance in 1884 was received as more a hybrid of English and Scotch football. Patrick O'Farrell and Chris McConville, along with Marcus De Búrca, have used similar logic to postulate that hurling (which was documented in Australia) was the influence; however, modern hurling was not codified until 1879.

== Connection to modern Gaelic football ==
A link between Caid and Gaelic football is spurious at best and has since been debunked by Irish historians from as early as the emergence of the modern code. It has since been found that the first club, Commercials in Limerick, had adopted some of the Victorian Rules of 1866, which were codified into Gaelic football in the 1880s.

Irish historian Garnham, citing R.M. Peter's Irish Football Annual of 1880, argued that Gaelic Football did not actually exist prior to the 1880s and refuted any link to traditional mob football.

Contemporary accounts from 1889 state that the variety of football that was becoming popular in Ireland in 1884 bore little resemblance at all to traditional mob football and was received by the public as more a hybrid of English and Scotch football.

Geoffrey Blainey in 2010 wrote:

If an historian of football wishes to press the argument that one code must have copied the other, then this conclusion would be difficult to escape: the style of play which Gaelic and Australian football share today was visible in Australia long before it was visible in Ireland. By that line of reasoning, Gaelic football must have been the imitator. The present evidence, however, suggests that Gaelic football made its own way … which happened to be—in the style rather than the formalities of play—in the Australian direction.

Former Gaelic footballer Joe Lennon's thorough post-doctoral research analysing accounts of caid and GAA codified rules against the Melbourne Football Club rules of 1859 not only indicates that there is little if no link between caid and Gaelic football, but also that the Victorian Rules of 1866 and 1877 appear to indicate direct copying, some virtually verbatim by the GAA, from Australian rules and other football codes, but primarily from the 1866 and 1877 Victorian rules. For example, early codified Gaelic called for Australian rules style behind posts (not present in caid and later removed) with 5 point goals scoring (later changed to 3) and 1 point "behind"s, all borrowed from Australian Rules and Rule 27 in reference to kicking styles; Rule 15 relating to foul play and rules dictating playing equipment appear to be directly borrowed from the Victorian Rules. Early Victorian Rules were played with a round ball until the introduction of the Sherrin in the 1880s. Other than the directly copied rules, analysts argue that so many of the rules are so similar to the Victorian Rules that it would have been impossible for the GAA rulemakers not to have obtained a deep knowledge of the Laws of Australian Football.

Caid is frequently used by people in Gaeltacht areas of Ireland to refer to modern Gaelic football.
