= J. B. Thompson =

Personal information
- Full name: James Bogne Thompson
- Born: 1829; Yorkshire, England
- Died: 18 July 1877; Melbourne, Victoria, Australia

Domestic team information
- Years: Team
- 1861/62: Victoria
- Only FC: 9 January 1862 Victoria v New South Wales

Career statistics
Competition	First-class
Matches	1
Runs scored	16
Batting average	16.00
100s/50s	0/0
Top score	16
Catches/stumpings	0/–
- Source: CricketArchive

James Bogne (Note: Thompson's middle name has alternately been spelled as Bogne and Bogue.) "J. B." Thompson (1829 – 18 July 1877) was one of the creators of the original laws of Australian rules football, one of the founders and the inaugural secretary of the Melbourne Football Club, a cricketer for Victoria and the Melbourne Cricket Club (MCC), and a journalist for Melbourne newspaper, The Argus.

== Early life ==
Thompson was born in 1829 in Yorkshire, England. He studied at Trinity College, Cambridge from 1845 to 1848, before deciding to travel to the British colony of Victoria, where he ended up living for the remainder of his life.

== Victoria ==
=== Cricket ===
Thompson was a respected amateur cricketer for the Melbourne Cricket Club and played one first-class match for Victoria, in the 1861–62 season, against New South Wales at the MCG. He batted in just one innings, scoring 16 runs. Victoria went on to win the match by ten wickets.

Thompson played for the Gentlemen of Victoria against the Gentlemen of New South Wales in 1858–59. He batted only in the first innings and scored six runs; he also took a catch while in the field. The match ended in a draw. Future collaborators in the codifying of Australian football's laws, Tom Wills and William Hammersley, also played in the match.

Thompson played twice for Victoria against H. H. Stephenson's XI in 1862. In the first match he scored 17 and a duck and Victoria lost by an innings and 96 runs. In the second match Thompson made 1 and 25 and the match ended in a draw.

In 1864 Thompson played for Bendigo against G. Parr's XI. Thompson batted twice, scoring one and zero, but took one wicket for 31 runs (1/31) and held onto a catch. Bendigo lost by 144 runs.

When G. Parr's XI played Castlemaine, also in 1864, Thompson, alongside Tom Wills, was the umpire.

=== Australian rules football ===
On 17 May 1859, Thompson, along with Tom Wills, Thomas H. Smith and William Hammersley (with some sources also including Wills' cousin H. C. A. Harrison), co-founded the Melbourne Football Club, the first ever Australian rules football club, of which he was inaugural secretary, at the Parade Hotel in East Melbourne. At the same meeting the men also created the first ever laws of Australian rules football, which became the foundation of the game.

Thompson played with the Melbourne Football Club for many years and during this time he also contributed to updating the laws of the game. Thompson disagreed with Wills about many aspects, as he thought that Wills was trying to implement more Rugby School rules into the game. Wills, however, did manage to implement many of the Rugby School rules, such as place kicks and marks. The disagreements culminated in 1860, when Melbourne, whom Thompson was captaining, played Richmond, whom Wills was captaining, and Wills used his position as captain to declare that he and his team would not play unless they used the oval shaped, Rugby School-styled ball, as opposed to a round ball, such as is used in association football, which had been used in all matches up to this point. In the end the game was played with an oval-shaped ball and to this day Australian rules football still uses that particular shape of ball.

=== Journalist ===
Thompson wrote for Melbourne-based newspaper, The Argus, for many years, contributing a weekly sports column, generally writing about cricket in the summer and football in the winter. After his falling out with Wills he used the column to criticise Wills for not turning up to a Victorian cricket team practice and for failing to provide an excuse.

Thompson was editor of The Victorian Cricketer's Guide for 1859–60.

== Death and legacy ==
Thompson died in Melbourne, on 18 July 1877, at the age of 48, from a combination of excessive alcohol consumption and bronchopneumonia.

Former Chief Executive of the Australian Football League (AFL), Andrew Demetriou, wrote in the introduction of The Australian Game of Football, "Our game does not belong to an idea by Tom Wills or dedicated management by H.C.A. Harrison, but it can be safely said that it was driven by a diverse collective of two journalists (Thompson and Hammersley), a teacher from Melbourne's Scotch College, Thomas Smith, and ... the hotelier, Jerry Bryant."

== Footnotes ==
Notes
