= Col Hutchinson =

Australian rules football statistician

Colin Hutchinson (born c. 1943) is a veteran statistician, most notably covering the Victorian/Australian Football League in the sport of Australian rules football. He was the AFL's official historian from the 1990s until around 2005.

A part of the AFL Players Association, Hutchinson provides interesting statistics on football to newspapers and media outlets.

He is the author of several books, including a history of the Geelong Football Club, titled Cats' Tales: the Geelong Football Club, 1897–1983), and The AFL Footy Quiz Book.

Hutchinson attended 1,294 consecutive matches involving the Geelong Football Club between Round 11, 1963, and the 2019 preliminary final, inclusive. That streak came to an end when he and the general public were locked out of the Cats' 2020 Round 1 loss to Greater Western Sydney in Sydney due to the COVID-19 pandemic. If away games are excluded, Hutchinson's streak lasted from the early 1958 season to the 2019 preliminary final—62 seasons in all.

In 1994, Hutchinson was honoured with Geelong Football Club life membership, and he received the Reg Hickey Award for outstanding service to Australian football in 1999.

Hutchison was the co-recipient the 2021 Jack Titus Medal for his dedication and service towards Australian rules football.

== Bibliography ==
- Cats' Tales: the Geelong Football Club, 1897–1983 (1984)
- The AFL Footy Quiz Book (2002)
