= Tony Collins (historian) =

British historian

- Born: 1961 (age 64–65); Hull, England
- Education: Holderness Academy, Warwick University
- Occupation: Historian
- Writing career
- Language: English
- Subjects: Sports history (esp. rugby football), Social history (esp. class)
- Website: tcollins.org

Tony Collins is a British social historian specialising in the history of sport.

He is emeritus professor of history at De Montfort University, a Research Fellow at the Institute of Sports Humanities, and in 2018 was a visiting professor at Beijing Sports University. He has written several award-winning books on the history of sport, is the host of the ‘Rugby Reloaded’ history podcast, and is a regular contributor to television and radio programmes.

== Career ==
In 1999, his first book Rugby’s Great Split, based on his 1996 PhD thesis, won the Aberdare Prize for Sports History Book of the Year. He has also won the Aberdare Prize for Rugby League in Twentieth Century Britain (2007), A Social History of English Rugby Union (2010) and The Oval World: A Global History of Rugby (2016). A Social History of English Rugby Union was also a winner of the 2015 'World in Union Book Award' for the best academic book on rugby union.

In addition to the social history of rugby league and rugby union, he has also written about the global rise of sport in books such as Sport in Capitalist Society (2013) and How Football Began: How the World’s Football Codes Were Born (2018).

In 2018, he launched the history podcast Rugby Reloaded which looks at the history of rugby and the other football codes around the world. In 2020, he was made a member of the Rugby Football League’s Roll of Honour in recognition of his work as a historian of the sport.

He has appeared and worked as a consultant on many television and radio programmes, including BBC Radio Four’s Sport and the British series, the History Channel’s Football: A Brief History By Alfie Allen, BBC Wales’ The Rugby Codebreakers, the 2019 New Zealand TV series The Story of Rugby, and 2020's Shane Williams: Rugby Concussion and Me.

He has also been a board or committee member of a number of public organisations including Rugby League Cares, the World Rugby Museum, Hull Kingston Rovers’ Community Trust, the historians’ panel of the National Football Museum's English Football Hall of Fame, and the Yorkshire and Humber region of the Heritage Lottery Fund. He was chairperson of the British Society for Sports History from 2001 to 2002 and the editor of the academic journal Sport in History from 2001 to 2007.

== Bibliography ==
Monographs

- Raising the Red Flag: Marxism, Labourism, and the Roots of British Communism, 1884–1921 (2022), Brill ISBN 9789004549616
- Rugby League: A People's History (2020), Scratching Shed ISBN 9781999333973
- How Football Began: A Global History of How the World's Football Codes Were Born (2018), Routledge, ISBN 9781138038745
- The Oval World: A Global History of Rugby (2015), Bloomsbury, ISBN 9781408831571
- Sport in Capitalist Society (2013), Routledge, ISBN 978-0-415-813556
- A Social History of English Rugby Union (2009), Routledge, ISBN 978-0-415-47660-7
- Rugby League in Twentieth Century Britain (2006), Routledge, ISBN 978-0-415-39615-8
- Rugby's Great Split (2nd Revised Edition) (2006), Routledge, ISBN 978-0-415-39617-2
- Mud, Sweat and Beers: A Cultural History of Sport and Alcohol (written with Wray Vamplew) (2002), Berg, ISBN 1-85973-558-4
- Rugby's Great Split (1998), Frank Cass, ISBN 0-7146-4354-8

Essay Collections

- Who Framed William Webb Ellis? (and other puzzles in rugby history) (2022), Scratching Shed ISBN 9781739247607
- 1895 And All That (2009), Scratching Shed Publishing, ISBN 978-0-9560075-9-9

Edited books

- The Rugby World in the Professional Era (edited with John Nauright) (2017) Routledge, ISBN 9781138665446
- Sport as History: Essays in Honour of Wray Vamplew (2010), Routledge, ISBN 978-0415575003
- Encyclopedia of traditional British rural sports (edited with John Martin and Wray Vamplew) (2005), Routledge, ISBN 0-415-35224-X
- The Glory of their Times: crossing the colour line in rugby league (edited with Phil Melling) (2004), Vertical, ISBN 978-1-904091-07-3

Lectures

- ’Ahr Waggy’ : Harold Wagstaff and the making of Anglo-Australian rugby league culture (2003), 5th Annual Tom Brock Lecture, ISBN 0-7334-2154-7
