= Thomas H. Smith =

Australian rules footballer

Thomas Henry Smith (born 1 July 1830 in Carrickmacross, County Monaghan, Ireland) was an Irish Australian who had a clear role in the origins of Australian football by being one of the first people to introduce school football games to Australian public schools in 1858 and as one of the founders of the Melbourne Football Club.

Smith was a founding member and signatory to the foundation document of the Melbourne Football Club. According to some sources (including himself in an 1876 letter to The Australasian) he was one of few people to be present at the meeting of the incorporation of the club on 17 May 1859. At this meeting, the first Laws of Australian Football were decided upon and written.

Smith was also a distinguished player for the club.

== Life ==
Educated at Trinity College Dublin (1846–50), Smith was a headmaster at several Melbourne secondary schools including the Model School and inspector for schools for Bendigo.

Smith was involved in early experimental matches of Australian Football against Melbourne Grammar School between July–August 1858 and is said to have facilitated the matches as one of three teachers who took part.

In addition to being involved in the football club, Smith was a cricketer and member of the Melbourne Cricket Club serving on the committee in 1861.

He was captain of the Melbourne Football club in 1862 during the Caledonian Society games. He was also the first captain to take a team away from home when Melbourne played the Geelong Football Club and won.

In 1864 he was suspended from teaching due to his sharp temper and strict discipline before resigning from his position in 1875. Smith was involved in the selection committee at Melbourne FC in 1865.

He moved to South Australia and in 1875 was election Captain of the Kapunda Football Club which renamed itself Light. The club ordered a rugby ball from Melbourne as not one was available in the Colony of South Australia.

In 1876, wrote to The Australasian from there to speak out against what he perceived as poor journalism from which had overlooked his role in the foundation of the Melbourne Football Club.

Details of his life are scant and according to the Melbourne Football Club, it is not known when and where he died.
