= Glossary of Australian rules football =

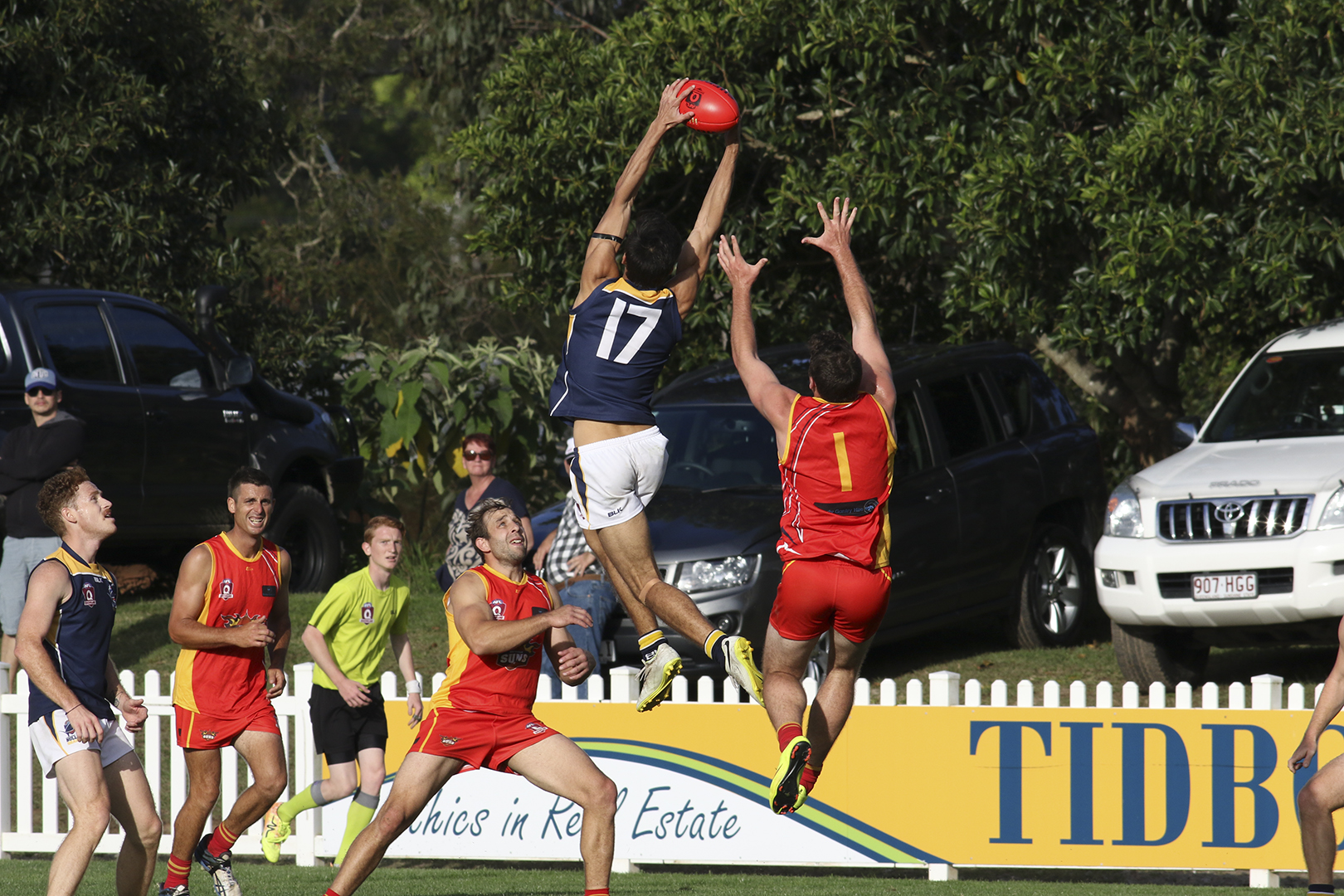
Australian rules football is known by several different names, including footy and Aussie rules.

This list is an alphabetical glossary of Australian rules football terms, jargon and slang. While some of these entries are shared with other sports, Australian rules football has developed a unique and rich terminology.

Where words in a sentence are also defined elsewhere in this article, they appear in italics.

== 0–9 ==
- 1–2: (pronounced one-two) an action where a player handpasses to a teammate, who immediately handpasses back.
- 6–6–6 rule: a rule introduced in the AFL from 2019 to reduce flooding that says that at centre bounces each team must have six players in their forward-50 arc, six players in their defensive-50 arc, and six players between the arcs.
- 12–10 rule: formerly a rule in the VFL concerning the selection of AFL-listed players in teams with an AFL affiliate team. When a team that was affiliated with an AFL team played against a team which was not affiliated with an AFL team, the affiliated team must have played at least 12 VFL-listed players and no more than 10 AFL-listed players. The 12–10 rule did not apply when two AFL-affiliated teams were playing each other; and, in those games, teams were able to play as many AFL-listed players as they wished. This rule has since been abolished.
- 19th man: at a time in the game before the substitute bench was introduced in 1930, one reserve player was named in addition to the 18 players who started the game on the ground. These players could enter the game only if one of the original 18 left the field and did not return. This was also extended to the 20th man when a second reserve was introduced in 1946. Free interchange of the 19th and 20th players has been allowed in the VFL/AFL since 1978. This can also refer to the philosophy of the South Australian crowd being the 19th man for the Adelaide Crows, who have retired the number 19 guernsey, and sell sporting merchandise with the number 19 on it.
- 50-metre arc: an arc marked at each end of the ground indicating that the distance from the goal line is 50 metres. In lower level competitions, the arc is often marked at 40 metres, depending on the size of the ground.
- 50-metre penalty: advances the attacking team forward by 50 metres after an opposition player has committed an infraction, such as pushing their opponent in the back after a mark has been paid, or time wasting.

== A ==
- Advantage: umpiring decision in which play is allowed to continue after an infringement if the team with the ball is infringed upon and earns a free kick, but would more benefit by play continuing rather than having play stopped to take the free kick.
- Aerial ping-pong: usually derogatory slang term for the sport in general, specifically used to refer to a game in which teams exchange long-distance kicks, like table tennis players batting the ball back-and-forth. Most often used in a negative way by fans of the more ground-based rugby football in New South Wales and Queensland.
- AFL: Australian Football League. This acronym is used colloquially as an alternative name for the sport when distinguishing it from other football codes, particularly in Queensland and New South Wales.
- After the siren: a set shot for goal taken after the final siren for a quarter or game has sounded, which is only possible if a player has taken a mark or received a free kick just before the siren.
- All-Australian: a player who has been chosen in the best team of the AFL competition each year, the All-Australian team; or, prior to the nationalisation of the competition or in lower age groups where the game is not nationalised, the best composite team from all states based on performances at an interstate carnival.
- And the Big Men Fly: a 1963 play about a fictional Australian rules football team, the Crows, and their star recruit Achilles Jones. It was also filmed and broadcast as a telemovie in 1963, and adapted into a mini-series in 1974. The play remained popular throughout the later part of the twentieth century. The title was a common term used by commentators in that era.
- Angle: the geometric angle formed by an imaginary line between a player taking a set shot and the centre of the goals (on the goal line), and another imaginary line perpendicular to the goal line. So, a player with "no angle" is taking a kick from directly in front; a player on a "wide angle" is taking a shot from near a boundary line.
- Anzac Day match: a game played between Collingwood and Essendon on Anzac Day each year since 1995; it is regarded as one of the biggest games of the season regardless of the ladder position of the two clubs.
- ARC (AFL Review Centre): a video review system established by the AFL to allow instantaneous review of scores and selected other umpiring decisions.
- Arc: see fifty metre arc.
- Arena: the playing surface, or the playing surface and grand stands.
- Around-the-corner (kick): a kicking style that has gained increasing popularity since the 2000s where the player kicks the ball across their body in a hooking style rather than using a traditional drop punt, in particular when taking a set shot on goal.
- Assist: to kick or handpass to a player who then scores either a goal (for a goal assist) or a behind (for a score assist). The term is common across many world sports.
- Australian football: name officially used by the AFL for the sport.
- Axed: see dropped.

== B ==
- Back-to-back: to win two premierships in a row.
- Bag: colloquialism for five or more goals scored by one player.
- Ball!: usually yelled by spectators when an opposition player is tackled in possession of the ball. Short for "holding the ball".
- Ball burster: colloquialism for a massive kick, usually a torpedo punt which travels over 70 metres.
- Ball magnet: a player who accrues a particularly large number or possessions or disposals in a game, particularly if done on a regular basis.

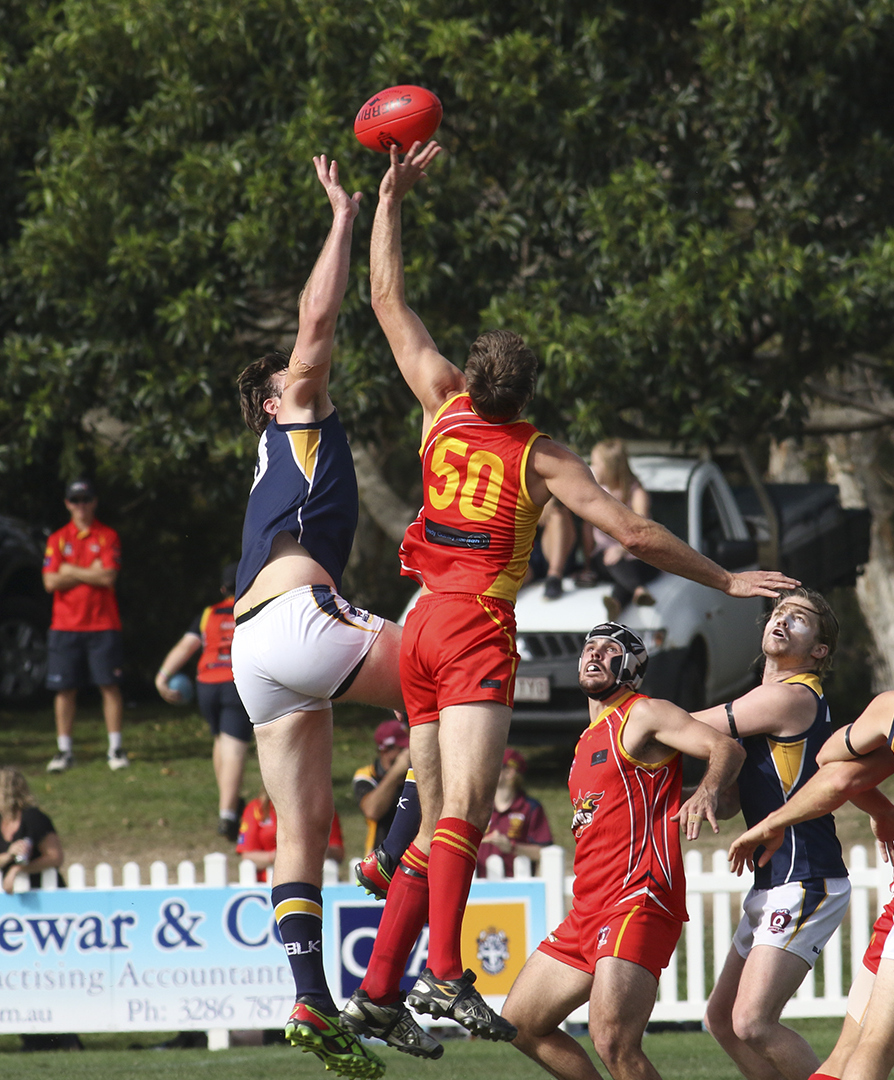
Ruckmen contesting a ball-up

- Ball-up: the act of a field umpire putting the ball back into play, either by throwing it vertically upwards into the air, or by bouncing the ball in such a way that it mimics the throwing action. See bounce-down. A ball-up is required at the start of each quarter, after a goal is scored, or to restart the game from neutral situations in the field of play.
- Banana: an alternative name for a checkside kick, particularly used in Victoria, as the ball moves in its flight in the shape of a banana. See checkside.
- Bandwagon supporter: a supporter that only shows any interest in their team when the team is experiencing success, or who starts supporting a team solely due to their current success. Also known as a 'bandwagoner'.
- Banner: a large crêpe paper and sticky-tape banner that players run through prior to a match.
- Barrack: to support or cheer for a team. A fan is known as a "barracker", while to ask someone who they barrack for is to ask which team they support.
- Barrel: see torpedo.
- Baulk: a manoeuvre where a player holds the ball out to the side in one hand, then runs in the other direction to evade a defender.
- Basketball background: used by commentators to highlight a player's past experience in basketball, often implying it explains their agility or skills.
- Behind: a score worth one point, earned by putting the ball between a goal post and a behind post, or by the ball hitting a goal post, or by the ball being touched prior to passing between the goalposts.
- Behind posts: two shorter vertical posts 19.2m apart on the goal line at each end of the ground, centred about the taller goal posts.
- Bench: the interchange area. The "bench" refers to the seat used by the players in this area.
- Benched: colloquial term for being taken off the ground under orders of the coach due to poor form or errors. See also dragged.
- Best on ground: player judged the best player taking part in any game. Often referred to as 'best on' or BOG, pronounced "bee-oh-gee".
- Big dance: colloquial term for a grand final.
- Big men: colloquial term for key position player.
- Blaze away: to kick the ball quickly and without much precision, often under pressure. It is typically a long, hopeful kick forward, rather than a well-directed one to a teammate.
- Blinder: an exceptional performance by a player or team.
- Blind turn: when a player with the ball spins their body 360° to try to avoid or break a tackle. So called as the player does not know what they will see when they complete the spin.
- Block: to impede an opposition player's attack on the ball, in particular their contesting of a mark or hitout. May be deemed an illegal move and warrant a free kick against.
- Bomb: a long high kick, particularly into the forward line, that hopes to score a goal or find a teammate rather than being specifically directed at them. As a verb, it means to perform such a kick, e.g., 'bombing to the goal square'.
- Bounce-down: (or simply bounce) A former game mechanic whereby a field umpire puts the ball back into play by bouncing it in such a way that it mimics a vertical throw. See ball-up. The centre bounce was phased out of the AFL Men's competition for the 2026 season. The AFL Women's competition has never featured bounce-downs.
- Boundary line: the line drawn on the ground to delimit the field of play.
- Boundary throw-in: (or simply throw-in) the act of throwing the ball back into play by the boundary umpire. The boundary umpire stands facing away from the field and throws the ball backwards over their head. This is used to restart play from neutral situations whenever the ball goes out of bounds.
- Boundary umpire: an official who patrols the boundary line, indicating when the ball has fully crossed that line, and who may then execute a boundary throw-in to return the ball to play. There are typically two of these umpires per game, one on each side of the oval, but there will be four in top grade games.
- Break: short for "break in play"; e.g. quarter-time, half-time, or three-quarter-time.
- Break a line: teams often set up in defensive lines across the ground which can be hard for an opposition to get through; to 'break a line' is to find a way through such a defensive line, e.g., by run-and-carry rather than kicking.
- Brownlow Medal: the Brownlow is awarded to the player judged to be the fairest and best player in the Australian Football League for the season. This is based on accumulated votes awarded by the field umpires at the conclusion of each home and away match during the season. Lower level competitions typically also award a best and fairest award which will have their own name, but which are often colloquially referred to as the Brownlow.
- Bump: a contact between players using the hip and/or shoulder.

== C ==
- Captain: sometimes known as skipper, is a player who has additional leadership responsibilities above those of a regular player. They are second to the coach and have various roles, including to inspire the players and sometimes address umpires and the media. Other captaincy titles are Co-Captain (multiple captains), Vice-Captain (second to the captain), and Deputy Vice-Captain (if both captain and vice-captain are injured)
- Carn: a call of support for one's team, traditionally used with a short version of the team's name, e.g., "Carn the Roos!". Often further abbreviated to carna, e.g., "Carna Tiges". While once very common, this term has lost popularity over the years. Most likely an abbreviation of 'come on'.
- Cellar dweller: colloquial term for a team in the lowest few places on the ladder.
- Centimetre perfect: a phrase commonly used by former commentator Dennis Cometti to refer to a kick that could not have been placed any better.
- Central umpire: an official who patrols the field of play, awarding free kicks, indicating time-on and time-off, and restarting the game after stoppages, goals etc.
- Centre: the middle of the ground, also the name given to a player who starts the game in that position.
- Centre bounce: the bounce of the ball in the centre of the ground to start a quarter, or after a goal.
- Centre square: a fifty-metre square drawn around the centre of the ground. Only four players from each team may stand inside the centre square prior to a centre bounce, but the square otherwise has no significance.
- Centre diamond: a forty-five-metre diamond drawn around the centre of the ground with the pointy ends facing each goal, it served the same purpose as the centre square from 1973 to 1974 before being replaced by the square in 1975.
- Chaos ball: a ball delivered forward by any means without necessarily directing it towards another player on that team, often with the intention of it hitting the ground and bouncing around chaotically, favouring small agile players and making it hard for opponents to cleanly defend. A tactic most successfully employed by Richmond during the 2017-20 period.

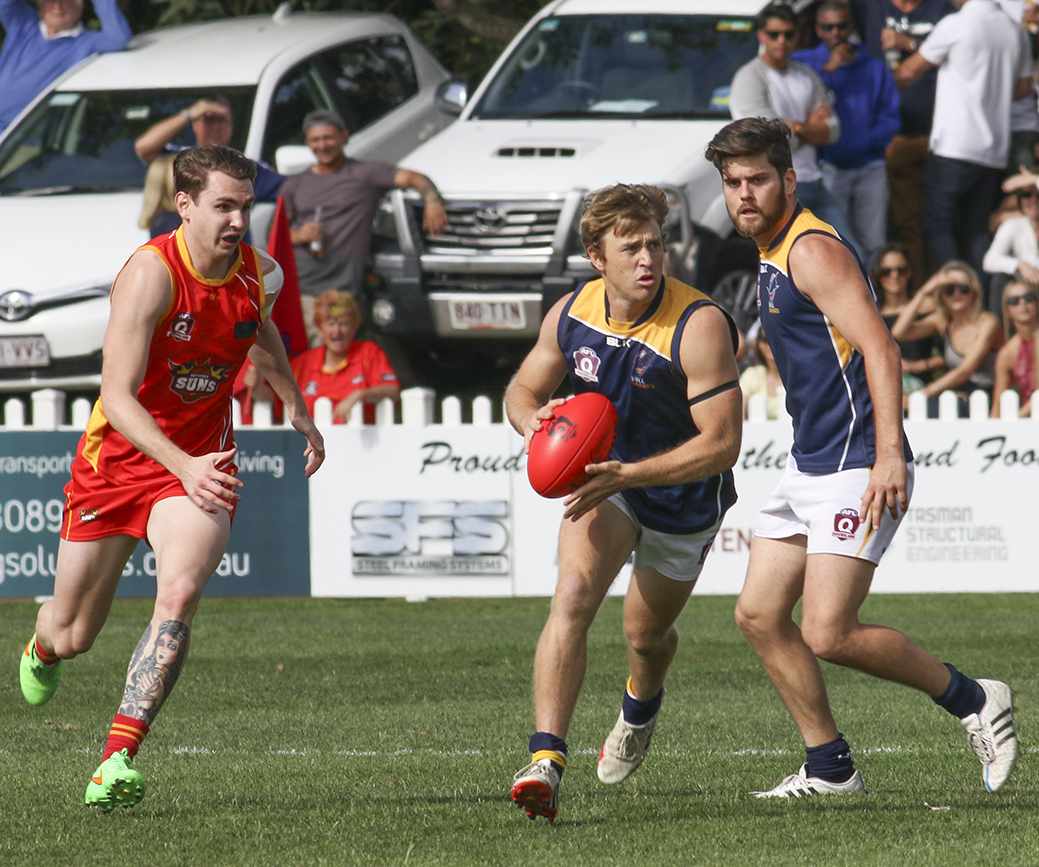
Defensive player giving chase to an attacking player with the ball

- Charlie/Chas: colloquialism for the Brownlow Medal as an abbreviation of its full name, the Charles Brownlow Trophy.
- Chase: the act of a defensive player running after an attacking player in possession of the ball.
- Checkside: a kick which causes the ball to swing in the air, often quite strongly, in the opposite direction to usual. See also banana.
- Cheer squad: an official supporter group of a club, they usually sit behind the goals at one end of the ground on game day, and take on responsibilities such as making the banner and leading chants during the match.
- Chicken wing tackle: a tackle that locks in an opponent's arm so that he cannot legally dispose of the ball. This term originated in rugby league.
- Clanger: a blatant, unforced error. This can be conceding a free kick, or kicking or handpassing the ball directly to an opponent or dropping an uncontested mark.
- Clearance: the clearing of the ball out of a stoppage situation, to the advantage of one team or the other.
- Clunk: to hold a mark, particularly a strong contested mark.
- Cluster: a type of zone defence consisting of a grid-like arrangement of fifteen or more players, particularly used to oppose a kick-in.

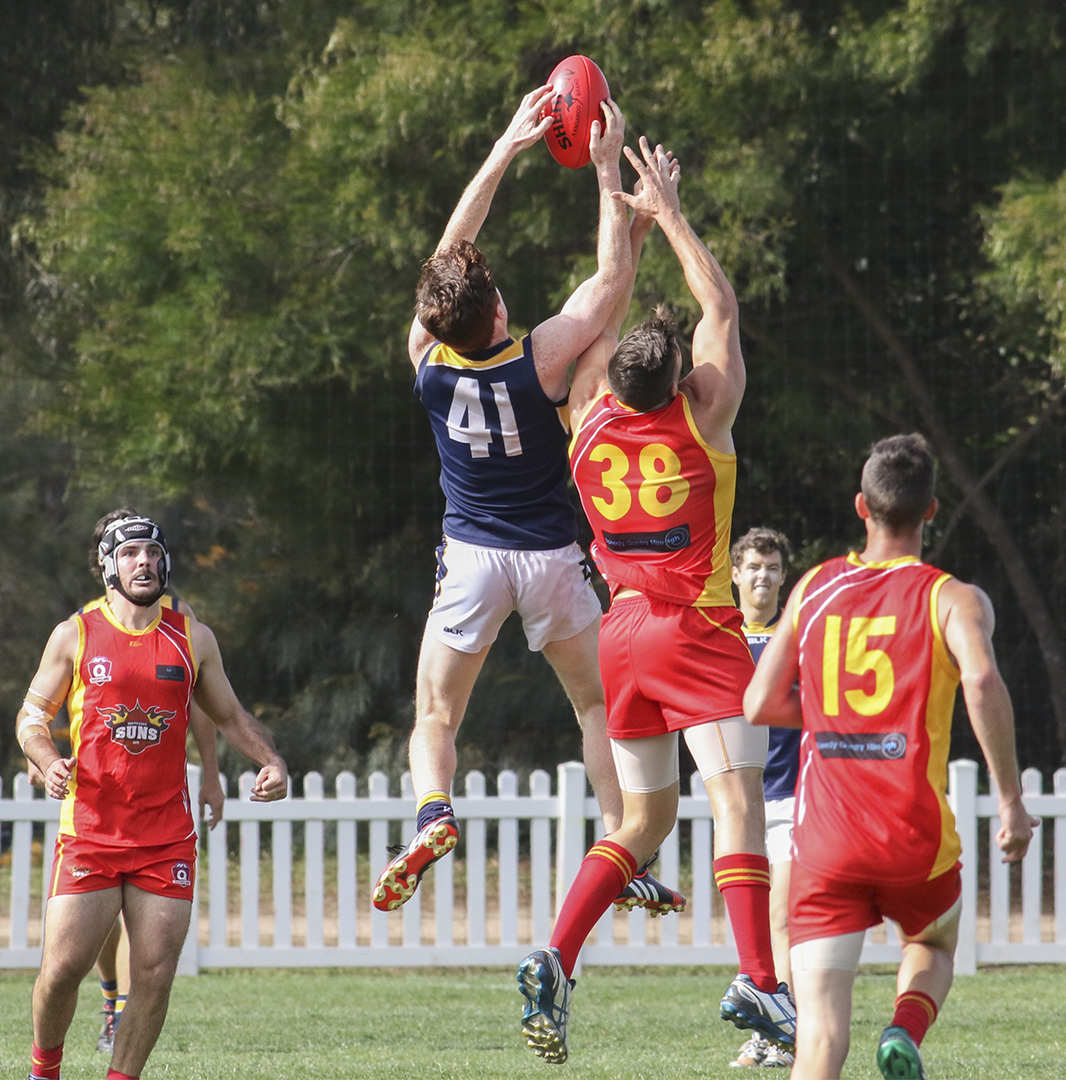
Player gains possession in a marking contest

- Coach: the manager of the team who controls the team's tactics during a match.
- Coast-to-coast goal: a passage of play beginning with a kick-in and ending with a goal, with the ball untouched by an opponent.
- Coathanger: a dangerous high tackle, generally with a slinging arm around the head or neck of an opponent.
- Coleman: the Coleman Medal is awarded to the player that kicks the most goals for the season in the AFL home-and-away rounds.
- Congestion: when a large number of players are gathered around the ball, making it hard to win clean possession or clear the area.
- Contest: an in-game scenario where two or more players have an opportunity to win the ball.
- Contested possession: a possession achieved as a result of winning a contest. Includes hard ball gets, loose ball gets, contested marks, free kicks won in a contest, and contested knock-ons.
- Corkie: colloquialism for a corked muscle, which is a deep bruise, usually in the leg.
- Corral: to trap an opposition player with the ball in a small area of the ground and apply pressure to them to try to force an error or turnover, but without necessarily making any attempt to tackle.
- Corridor: the imaginary strip of the ground that runs through the centre from goal to goal; a team who moves the ball in this area is said to "play through the corridor".
- Coterie: an elite, exclusive supporter group at a club, coterie members usually buy very expensive memberships, individually sponsor players, and may make other financial or in-kind payments to a club. In return, they are rewarded with benefits such as personal meetings with players, addresses by coaching staff, and premium match-day seating.
- Coward punch: more contemporary term for a king hit.
- Crossing the line: a ruck steps over the halfway line running through the centre circle, while they are contesting a centre ball up. Since 2026, this has been specifically outlawed at AFL level and will result in an opposition free kick.
- Crow throw: a handball technique which involves using a significantly shorter arm swing from the punching hand. The style was somewhat unique to South Australia in the SANFL, in interstate and State of Origin matches and ultimately to the Adelaide Crows when they joined the AFL. As a result, outside of South Australia, the technique was given the pejorative name crow throw (derived from croweater, a common name for South Australians, and the suggestion that it was more of a throw than legitimate handball).

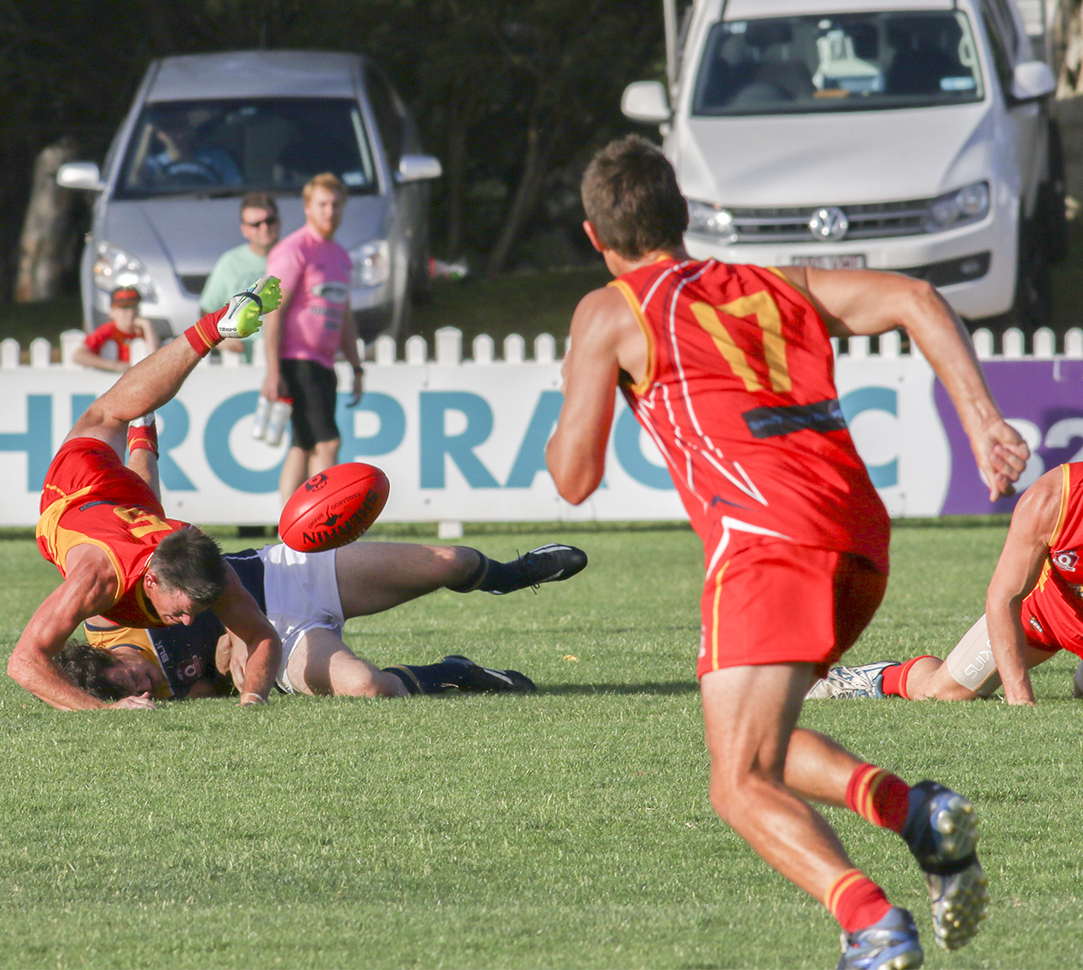
Player (foreground) moving in to collect the crumb from a contest

- Crumb: a ball that spills loose from a contest. A player who collects the crumb is described as a "crumber", or "getting the crumbs". To "crumb a goal" is to score after getting the crumbs.
- Cult Figure: a player or players who despite potentially not being the most statistically dominant or decorated, gain a passionate and dedicated fanbase due to their unique personalities, memorable moments, or distinctive playing styles.
- Coin toss: Someone from a team gets picked to do a coin toss, both the captains from each team stand next to that person, the captains pick a side (heads or tails) then the person who was chosen tosses it, the winning captain will then choose which end of the ground that they are playing on.

== D ==
- Daisy cutter: a very low, hard kick, usually in the drop punt style, that travels its entire distance very close to the ground. The name implies that it is so low and hard that it would 'cut the heads off daisies'. See also worm burner, cf. dribble, grubber.
- Deliberate: a free kick awarded against a player who is perceived to have deliberately sent the ball out of bounds. After stricter enforcement led to increasing controversy, in 2021 this rule was altered to refer to insufficient intent to keep the ball in play, rather than 'deliberately' putting it out of bounds.
- Derby: a home-and-away game played between two teams from the same state, besides Victoria. The term initially referred to the Western Derby as Western Australia was the first state, besides Victoria, to have more than one team. However, with the introduction of Port Adelaide, Gold Coast and Greater Western Sydney into the AFL, the term now refers to all four derbies.
- Designated kicker: a player who is given the ball by another player who has a set shot for goal, so that the receiving player may have a shot on the run for a long-distance goal. Typically done when the designated kicker is known to have a better likelihood of scoring the goal than the player taking the set shot.
- Diehard: a supporter that remains extremely loyal to their team no matter how badly they are performing, for example, by continuing to attend every game.
- Disposal: passing the ball legally, via a handball or kick.
- Dive: to exaggerate contact by intentionally throwing oneself forward or to the ground to try to attract a free kick, most commonly seen while trying to attract a push in the back free kick in a marking contest.
- Don't argue: colloquial term for a stiff-arm fend.
- Down the line: to move the ball forward without a change in direction, usually referring to a long kick adjacent to the boundary line to a waiting pack of players. Generally performed when no better option is available. cf. switch.
- Drag/dragged: colloquial term for being taken off the ground under orders of the coach due to poor form or errors. Commonly used in the past tense, "He's been dragged". See also benched.
- Draw: (i) to finish a game with both teams having an equal score. In this situation, both teams are awarded two premiership points rather than the four awarded for a win. Drawn matches can no longer occur in finals, with the game to be played out in continuous periods of extra time until a winner is crowned. Prior to 1991, finals matches were instead replayed in full the following week; this remained the case for grand finals until 2016. (ii) an alternative, more colloquial term for the season's games, see fixture.
- Dreamtime at the 'G: a game played between Essendon and Richmond each year since 2005 to recognise the contributions of Indigenous Australians to the game; it is regarded as one of the biggest games of the season regardless of the ladder position of the two clubs.
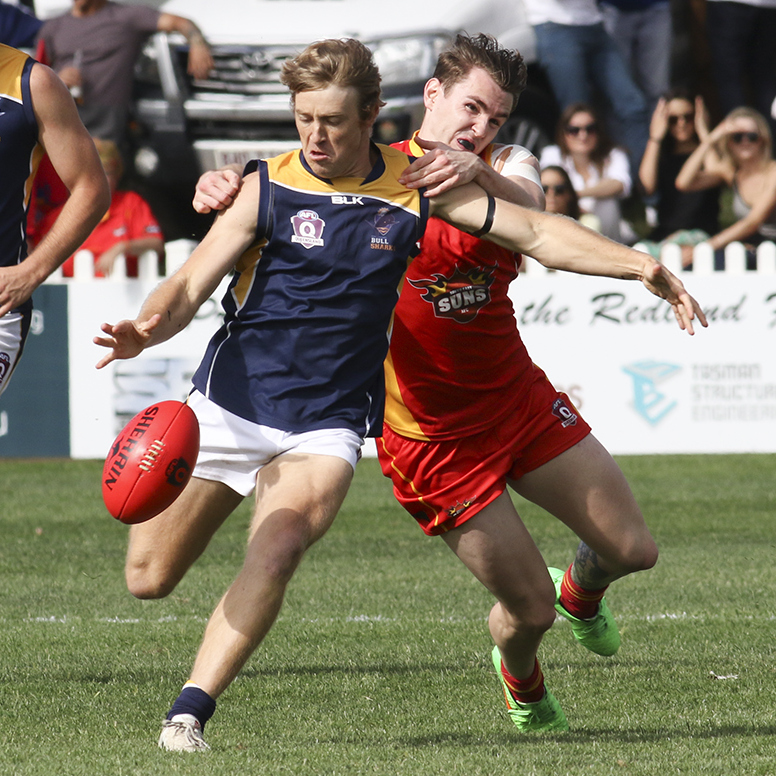

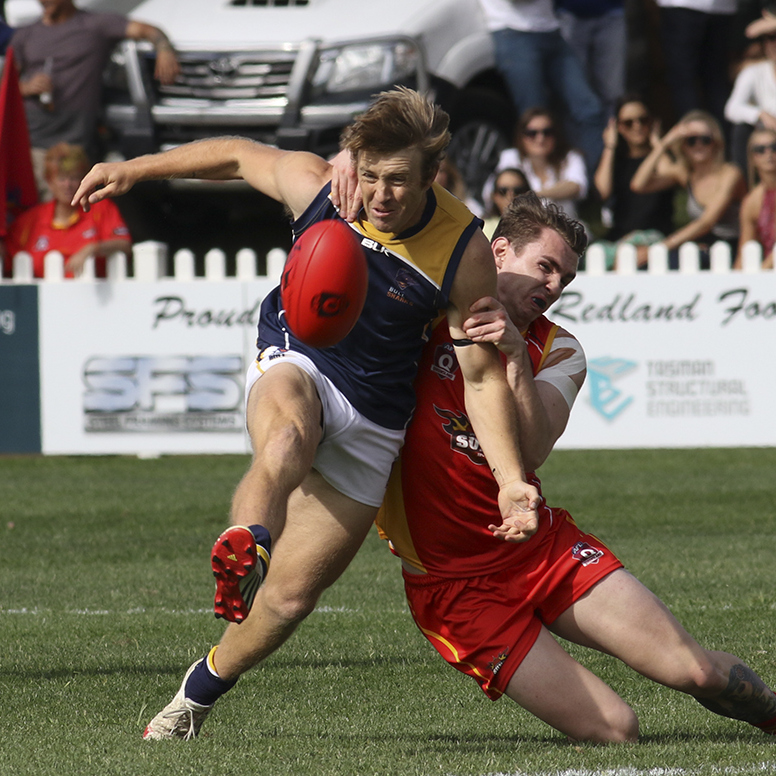
Player executes a drop punt

- Dribble: to intentionally kick the ball so that it tumbles and rolls along the ground. Similar in appearance to a grubber, but in current usage the grubber is usually regarded as resulting from a skill error. cf. scrubber, daisy cutter, worm burner.
- Dribble goal: a goal kicked using the dribble technique. It is often utilised from the boundary line at a tight angle with players manipulating the bounce of the ball to bend it through the goals.
- Drop kick: a kick that is executed in such a way that the foot contacts the ball at the same time as, or immediately after, it has been dropped to the ground on its end. No longer in common use in Australian rules football due to its perceived inaccuracy. See stab pass.
- Drop punt: a kick that is executed by contacting the ball on its end, so that it rotates around its midpoint end over end. Usually considered the most accurate of kicks, and is by far the most commonly used kicking style in Australian rules football.
- Drop/dropped: common colloquial term for demoting a player from the team for a later game due to poor form or errors. Comes from the notion of dropping from a higher team to a lower team, such as from firsts to seconds. Commonly used in the past tense, "He's been dropped". See also omit.
- Dropping the ball: see holding the ball.
- Duck: to intentionally drop-down during, or just prior to, a tackle in order to try to attract a free kick for high contact. If the umpire determines that the player has ducked, no free kick is awarded.
- Ducker: a player noted for regularly ducking, or who is particularly adept at attracting free kicks from ducking.
- Dummy: see baulk.
- Dynasty: a team that wins multiple premierships over a short period of time, especially multiple premierships in a row. The minimum requirement for a dynasty is typically three premierships in around three to five years.

== E ==
- Eight, the: a reference to the top eight teams in the AFL who will qualify to play finals. In other competitions this may be the four, the five, the six, etc., depending on how many teams qualify to reach the finals.
- Emergency umpire: a qualified field umpire who sits on the interchange bench during a game. They can pay free kicks only for interchange infringements and may report players, and can replace an injured or fatigued umpire.
- Equal the contest: when a player is outnumbered by opponents, such as in a marking or ground ball contest, but manages to bring the ball to ground, hold up play, or maintain possession until teammates are able to arrive to help out.
- Evade: when a player in possession of the ball manages to avoid being tackled.
- Extra time: the time added to the game in the case of a drawn final. Since 2019, this has involved teams playing three-minute halves, plus time-on, with the team in front after this time deemed the winner. If scores are again tied, additional periods of extra time with changes of ends are played until there is a winner.

== F ==
- Falcon: to be hit by the ball in your face or head.
- Fat side: an imaginary area of the ground that indicates the greatest space occupied by the fewest players. cf. thin side.

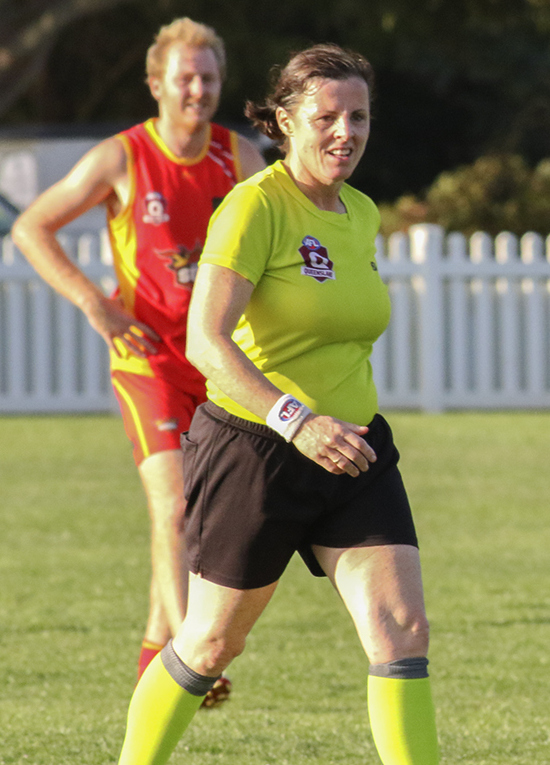
Field umpire

- Field umpire: see central umpire.
- Fifty: see 50-metre penalty.
- Final siren: the siren that sounds to signal the end of the game.
- Finals: the post-season series of games that decide the premiership.
- Find the sticks: a player skilled at kicking goals; usually refers to players other than the forwards.
- First picked: colloquial term for a player that is highly valuable to a team, but typically not applied to the star players. The expression indicates that the selectors would automatically pick this player each game, rather than literally picking them first.
- Fist: to punch the ball with a closed hand in order to try to spoil a mark or clear the area.
- Fixture: the schedule of matches to be played over the course of the season.
- Flag, the: common expression for the premiership, based upon the practice of awarding a flag for winning the premiership (analogous to the pennant in American sports).
- Flags: white flag waved by a goal umpire to signal a goal or behind.
- Flank: an indicative area of the ground that lies between the wing and pocket on both sides of the centre. Also referred to as "half-forward flank" and "half-back flank".
- Flick pass: variant of a handball in which the ball is propelled with a flick of an open hand, rather than a clenched fist. Flick passes were formerly legal, but are now considered a type of throw.
- Flight: the way a ball travels through the air.
- Floater: a kick which sees the ball spinning and floating unpredictably((cn)) through the air.
- Flog: (i) to defeat an opposition team very soundly. See also kill, thrash; (ii) a derogatory term usually applied to an opposition player or personnel who it is felt has a very disagreeable personality, e.g., "He's a flog".

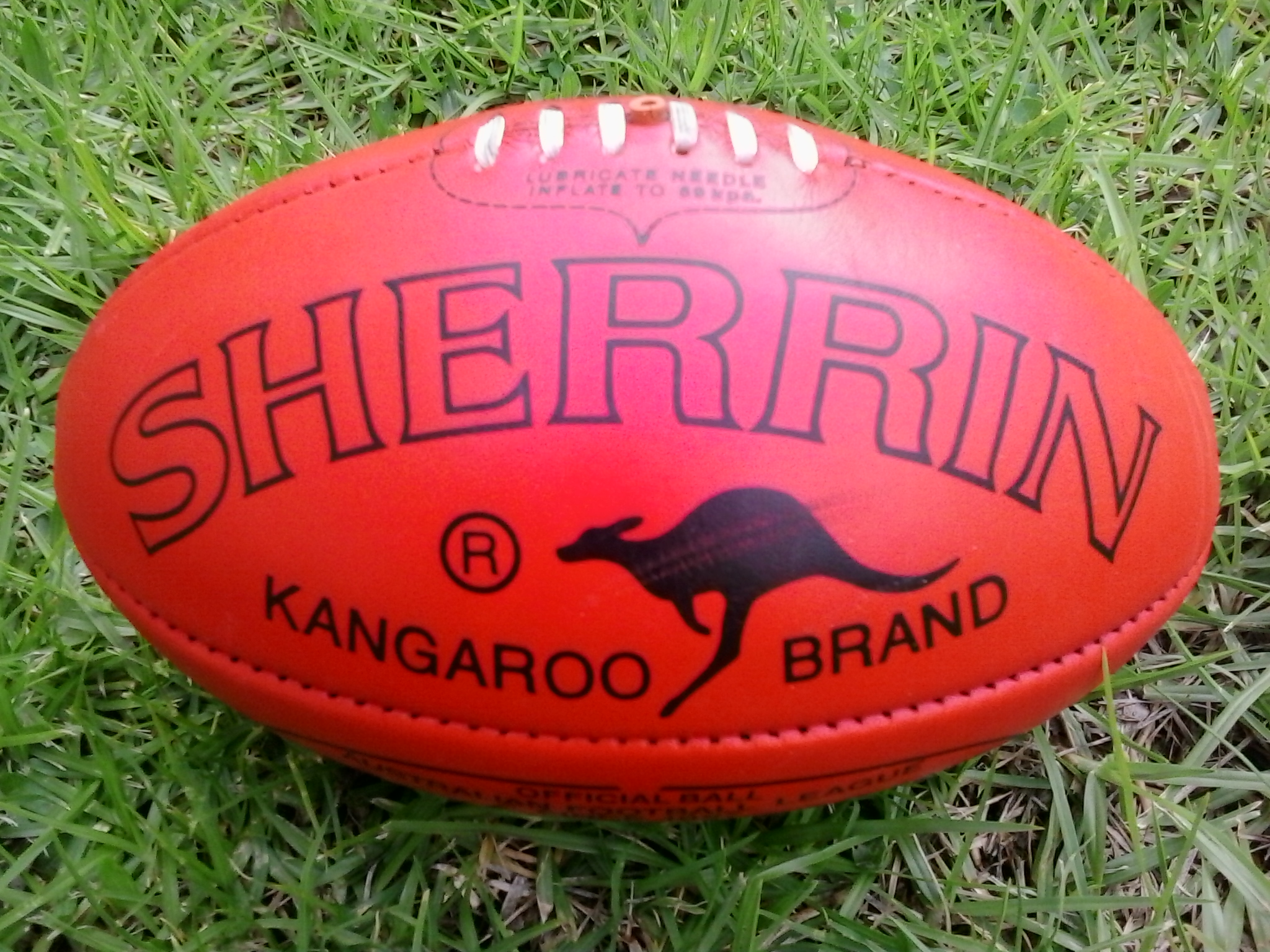
A football, known colloquially as a footy

- Flogger: enormous coloured pom-poms waved by a team's cheer squad or fans after a goal is scored. These are traditionally hung over the fence behind the goals. They are now often smaller than in the past as they obscure the fence-line advertising and are a potential hazard to players.
- Flood: the act of getting as many players as possible between the ball carrier and the goal a team is defending.
- Fly: to leap for a mark, particularly when leaping above another player or pack.
- Follower: an old term referring to an on-the-ball player, so named because they were the only players who followed the ball wherever it went. Specifically, the ruck, ruck-rover and rover were considered followers. The term is less applicable in the modern game, where many more players will tend to move around the ground.
- Footy: (i) slang term for the game of Australian rules football; (ii) abbreviated term for the actual ball itself.
- Forward entry: statistic for when the ball enters the attacking team's 50-metre arc.
- Four points, to get the: common parlance for winning a game. The "four points" refers to the number of premiership points awarded for a win in an AFL game and in many other leagues. "To get the two points" would be the South Australian equivalent.
- Free kick: a possession of the ball given to a player as a result of an infringement by an opposition player. These are generally only awarded by the central umpire.
- Front-and-centre: to position oneself in front of the middle of a flying pack of players as the ball often spills from the pack to this position. Applied in particular to players near goal that can generate an immediate shot on goal. Best executed with a well-timed run so that the player gathers the ball at speed, making them less likely to be tackled.
- Front-and-square: see front-and-centre.
- Front-on (contact): a free kick awarded usually for trying to prevent an opponent from marking by bumping them from the front, where the only intent is to impede the player rather than contest the ball.
- Full-back: the area of the ground directly in front of the opposition's goals. Also the name given to the player placed in that position. Usually opposed by the full-forward.
- Full-forward: the area of the ground directly in front of a team's goals. Also the name given to the player placed in that position. Usually opposed by the full-back.
- Full-time: the end of the game. See final siren.

== G ==
- Gather: a possession earned as a result of a teammate deliberately directing the ball in a player's direction via a disposal, hitout or knock-on.
- Give a run: see have a run.
- Gluepot: a very muddy playing field, so called because the muddy area can become very sticky to run through, and the ball can stick in the mud rather than bouncing or rolling through. Particularly seen on grounds with turf cricket pitches due to the types of soil used for the pitch. Once common, particularly in wet Melbourne winters, but not often seen in the professional modern game due to improved drainage and better ground management techniques.
- Goal: a maximum score (equivalent to six points) achieved by kicking the ball between the two goal posts without it touching either post or any other player.
- Goalkeeper: a defensive player that waits back on the goal line to try to intercept rushed shots on goal. While the name is derived from the goalkeeper role in soccer, it is not an official position in Australian rules football and is most often employed late in close games when a snapped shot could change the result.
- Goal line: a section of the boundary line that runs from one behind post to the other, at each end. All four posts (two goal posts and two behind posts) are set directly on this line.

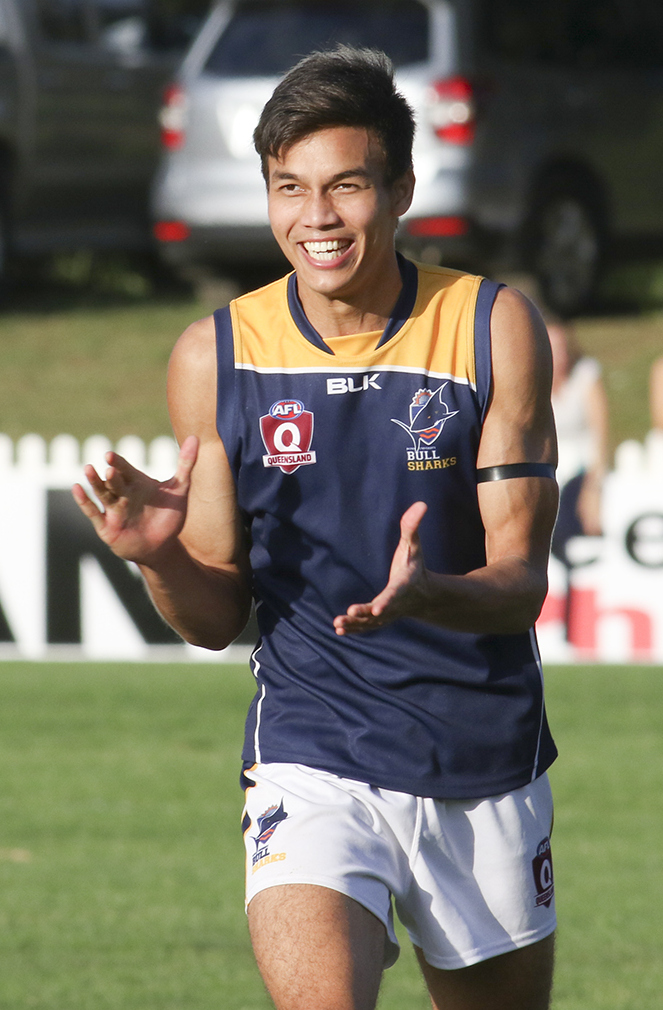
Player wearing a guernsey

- Goal posts: two tall posts at each end of the ground indicating the major scoring zone, positioned 6.4m apart.
- Goal sneak: a player noted for being able to score unlikely goals, such as via snaps from the boundary or elite roving from packs.
- Goal square: the 6.4×9m rectangle drawn on the ground directly in front of each goal.
- Goal umpire: an official who adjudicates the score, signals the score (out-of-bounds, behind, or goal), waves flags to indicate the score to the crowd, and serves as official scorekeeper. There are two of these umpires per game, one at each end.
- Gorilla: colloquially, a large, strong defender who plays body-on-body defence against the strongest forwards.
- Grab: see mark.
- Grand final: the conclusive game of a finals series that decides a league's premiership-winning team.
- Granny: an abbreviation of the term Grand Final; see grand final.
- Ground ball: a ball collected by a player from the ground, rather than through the air via a kick or handball.
- Grubber: a kick that rolls and tumbles along the ground rather than through the air. In current usage, a grubber is typically regarded as resulting from a skill error, while an intentional grubber-style kick is typically termed a dribble. cf. scrubber, daisy cutter, worm burner.
- Guernsey: the shirt worn by players, typically sleeveless, but occasionally with long sleeves. Traditionally they were made of wool, but in modern times are largely made of synthetic materials.
- Gun: a term for an exceptionally skilled or talented player.
- Guts, the: colloquial term for the corridor. Supporters often encourage teams to go "up the guts" if trailing late in a game.

== H ==
- Hack kick: a kick completed under high pressure, particularly coming out of defence, where the player makes no attempt to deliver the ball to a teammate, but is simply trying to clear it from the immediate area. Can also refer to, in more general terms, any kick that is completed in an unskillful manner.
- Half-back: the area of the ground lying halfway between the centre and full-back. Also the name given to the player placed in that position. Usually opposed by the half-forward.
- Half-forward: the area of the ground lying halfway between the centre and full-forward. Also the name given to the player placed in that position. Usually opposed by the half-back.
- Half-time: the long break between the second and third quarters.
- Hammy: a severe hamstring injury (as in "pulled a hammy"). Also hammie.

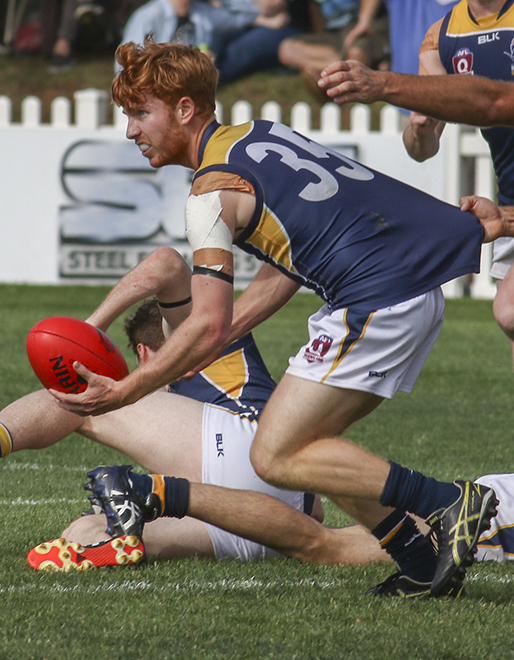
Player preparing to handball

- Handball: (or handpass) a disposal of the ball, executed by holding the ball on the flat palm of one hand and hitting it with the other clenched fist.
- Handy point: colloquial term for a behind scored near the end of a close game which extends to one more than a multiple of six (i.e. from six points to seven points, from twelve points to thirteen points, or from eighteen points to nineteen points); so called because it means the opposition needs an extra scoring shot to tie or win the game.
- Hanger: see spectacular mark.
- Hard ball get: see contested possession.
- Hard nut: a player considered to be very tough and hard at the ball.
- Have a run: to get out on the field of play, particularly of a player that has been on the bench for a long period of time. Can also refer to a player who has not been in the team getting selected, e.g., "Smith can have a run this week". Also get a run.
- Have the wood over: to regularly beat a particular opposition team over an extended period of time.
- High contact: a tackle that results in contact to the opposition player over the top of their shoulders or to the neck or head. This will result in a free kick. See also duck.
- High flyer: see spectacular mark. Can also refer to a player who is noted for regularly taking or attempting spectacular marks.
- Hip-and-shoulder: see bump.
- Hit the post: a kicked ball which hits a goal post, resulting in a behind being scored rather than a goal.
- Hit the woodwork: see hit the post.
- Hitout: Knocking the ball out of the ruck contest following a stoppage with clear control, regardless of which side wins the following contest at ground level.
- Holding the ball: a free kick awarded to a defensive player who tackles an opponent and prevents him from legally disposing of the football.
- Holding the man: a free kick awarded to a player tackled while not in possession of the ball.
- Home-and-away games: the regular season games used to determine which teams make the finals.
- Hose: alternative name for the team socks worn by players.
- Hospital handball: a handball—typically (although not always) a high, looping pass—that puts the intended recipient's safety in jeopardy as well as risking a turnover.
- Hospital kick: a very high kick to a teammate, allowing opposition players to run in and crash into the person attempting to mark the kick. Can also be a hospital pass.
- Hot spot: the point at the top of the goal square where the contest for the ball is fierce.

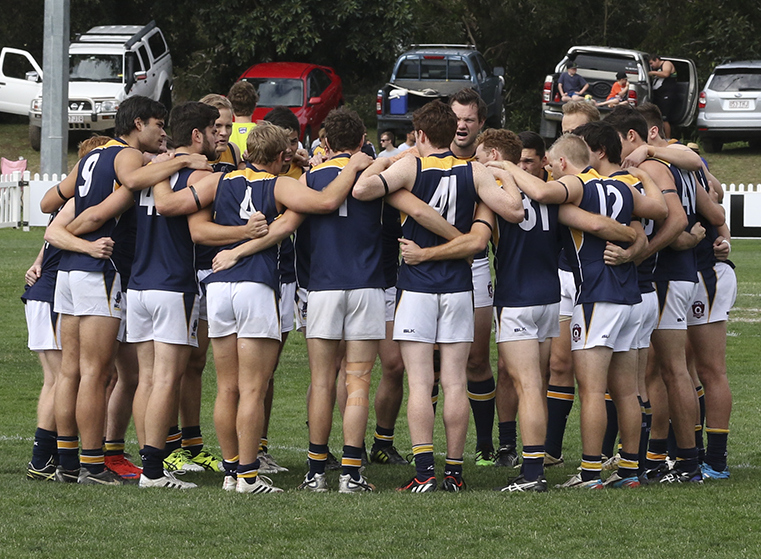
Players in a huddle

- Huddle: the grouping of players on the ground at quarter-time and three-quarter-time breaks, and a tactic used at kick-ins after a behind where players group together at centre-half-back before breaking to the flanks.

== I ==
- In-and-under player: (or inside midfielder) a player who tries to win hard ball gets by forcing the ball out of packs.
- Inside-50: the act of running or passing the ball inside the 50-metre arc. A statistic that is used to evaluate the effectiveness of midfield players who may not score many goals themselves, but set them up for teammates.
- Insufficient intent: a rewording of the deliberate out-of-bounds rule to refer instead to insufficient attempt to keep the ball in play. See deliberate.
- Intercept: to cut off balls being driven forward by the opposition. An interceptor is a player who has a key role of intercepting and rebounding.
- Intercept defender: a player whose key role is to play in defence and intercept opposition attacks. This is usually a strong-marking player, who is expected to take 'intercept marks'. In the modern game, this role is often created by playing a loose, seventh player in defence.
- Interchange bench: the designated area of the ground where players wait to be allowed onto the field after another player has left, i.e. one player is interchanged for another.
- Interchange gate: a 20-metre zone marked on the boundary line through which players being interchanged must run.
- In the back: see push in the back.
- Irish experiment: the recruitment of Irish Gaelic footballers by AFL clubs.

== J ==
- Joe the Goose: colloquial, usually disparaging, term for an easy goal scored by a player who has played little part in generating the score. Most commonly, this is an uncontested player in the goal square who is delivered a handball or short pass and simply has to turn and kick the goal from very close range while under no pressure.
- Jumper: see guernsey.
- Jumper punch: where a player takes hold of an opponent's guernsey (or jumper) and then pushes in a punching motion.

== K ==
- Keep a lid on it: to avoid getting overly optimistic about a team's long-term prospects based on short-term form, e.g., avoiding talking about premiership hopes after an early season run of wins. cf. lid is off.
- Key position: the full-forward, centre half-forward, centre half-back and full-back are collectively known as the key positions, and are considered the most difficult roles to play.

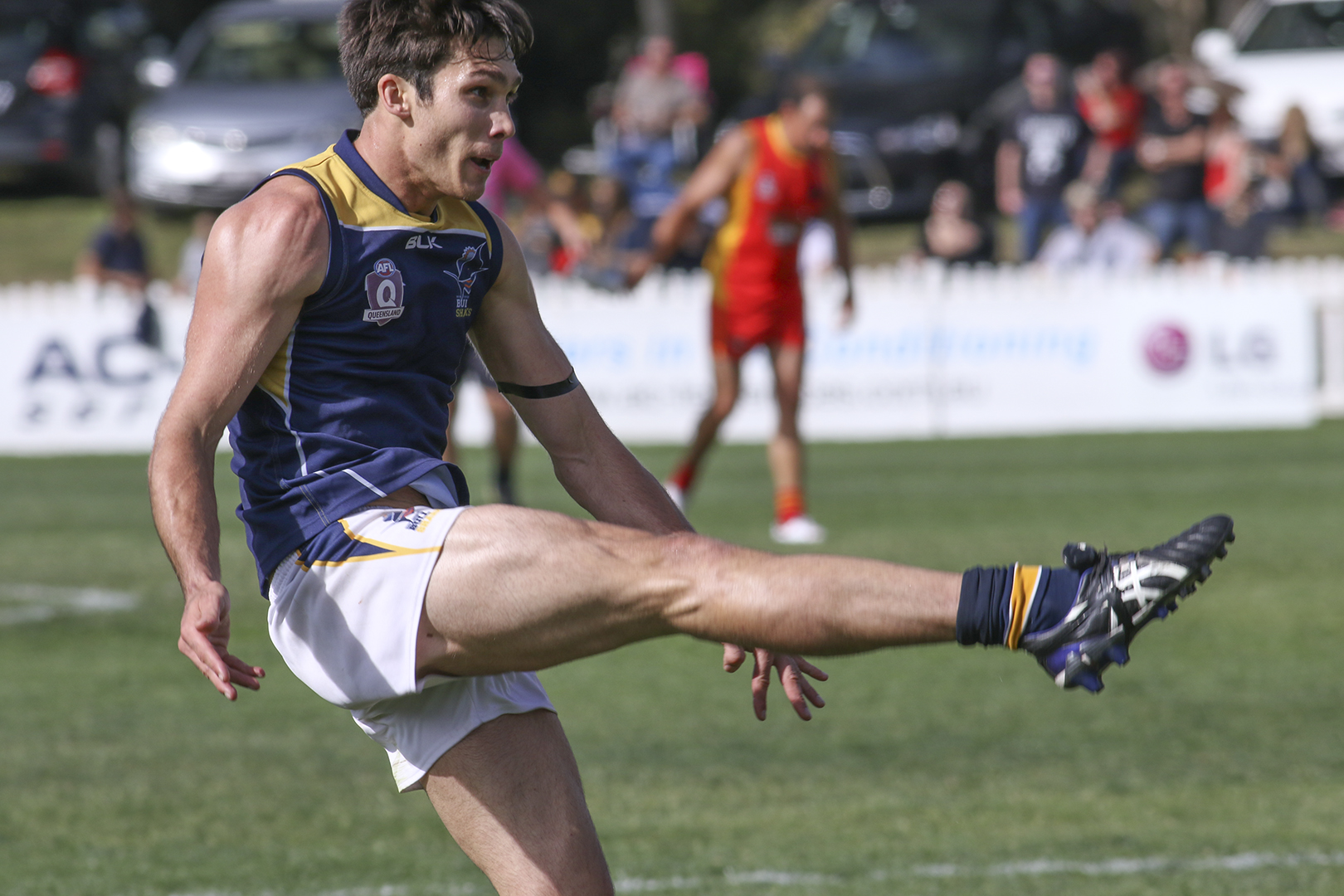
The follow through motion of a kick

- Kick: a legal disposal of the ball by foot. By formal definition, contacting the football with any part of a player's leg below the knee is considered a kick.
- Kick-in: (or sometimes kick-out) the return of the ball back into play after a behind has been scored.
- Kicking in danger: swinging one's leg to kick the ball when an opponent has either their hand or head near the ball.
- Kick-off line: the line on the goal square which is parallel to the goal line.
- Kill: (i) to conclusively stop a contest, in particular when a defender spoils an attack by putting the ball out of bounds or through for a behind; (ii) to defeat an opposition team very soundly. See also flog, thrash.
- King hit: an illegal physical attack on a player behind play, generally to the head, which leaves the victim in a dazed or unconscious state. Now often referred to as a coward punch.
- Knock-on: when a player using their hands to move the ball to a teammate's advantage—either by knocking it through the air or along the ground—rather than take possession within a chain of play.

== L ==
- Ladder: the position of teams on the premiership list, determined by their win–loss ratio and percentage.
- Last Disposal: A free kick awarded against the last player to dispose of the ball which travels out of bounds without being touched by another player. Last disposal specifically applies between the 50m arcs in the AFL Women's and AFL Men's competitions, with the latter introducing the rule for 2026.
- Last Saturday in September: the AFL grand final day, a reference to the fact that the grand final is usually scheduled on this day.
- Lead: when a player runs away from their direct opponent and into space, hoping to attract a pass from a teammate. Particularly applied to players in the forward line.
- Lead-up: a type of player (typically a forward) that primarily gets kicks from making leads.
- Leather poisoning: a player who gains many possessions during a game, derived from mock infection via touching the leather footy too many times.
- Leg/legging: see low tackle.
- Lick of the ice cream: to share in a team's dominance through individual reward, e.g., a player kicking a goal themselves after being involved in numerous goal assists is said to have had their "lick of the ice cream".
- Lid is off: to decide that short-term form is indicative of long-term prospects, e.g., to decide that a team going well is a genuine premiership contender. cf. keep a lid on it.
- Lockdown defender: a defender whose key role is the play man-on-man with a key opposition forward to minimise their impact on the game.
- Long bomb: see bomb.
- Long leg: a player able to kick the ball a long distance, e.g., 'he has a long leg'.
- Loose: a player playing without any direct opponent. Also used to refer to when a player being tagged gets free of their tagger.
- Loose ball get: a disputed ball at ground level not under direct physical pressure that results in an opportunity to record a legal disposal. Counted as a contested possession.
- Loose man in defence: a loose player in the defensive half who is playing without a direct opponent, who assists other defenders in the team when necessary, and is often heavily involved in rebounding.
- Low tackle: a tackle resulting in contact made to a player below their knees. Results in a free kick against the tackling player.
- Lower the eyes: to look for a leading player rather than just bombing the ball to a contest, particularly when a running player is kicking to their forwards.

== M ==
- Maggot: used derisively by fans to describe an umpire (umpires traditionally wore an all-white uniform).
- Magoos: used to denote a lower-level team or competition, such as the seconds or reserves; rhyming slang for 'twos'. To "send someone back to the magoos" is to drop or omit them from the senior team.
- Main contest: any point of play where the ball is in contest between the opposing players.
- Major: a goal.
- Managed: leaving a player out of the team for a reason other than poor form or injury, such as due to a returning senior player or for a rest. However, it is also sometimes used as a politically correct way of saying dropped or omitted.
- Manic pressure: continuous pressure being applied to the ball carrier by the opposition from every direction to force turnovers. A tactic most often associated with Richmond during their 2017–2020 dynasty.

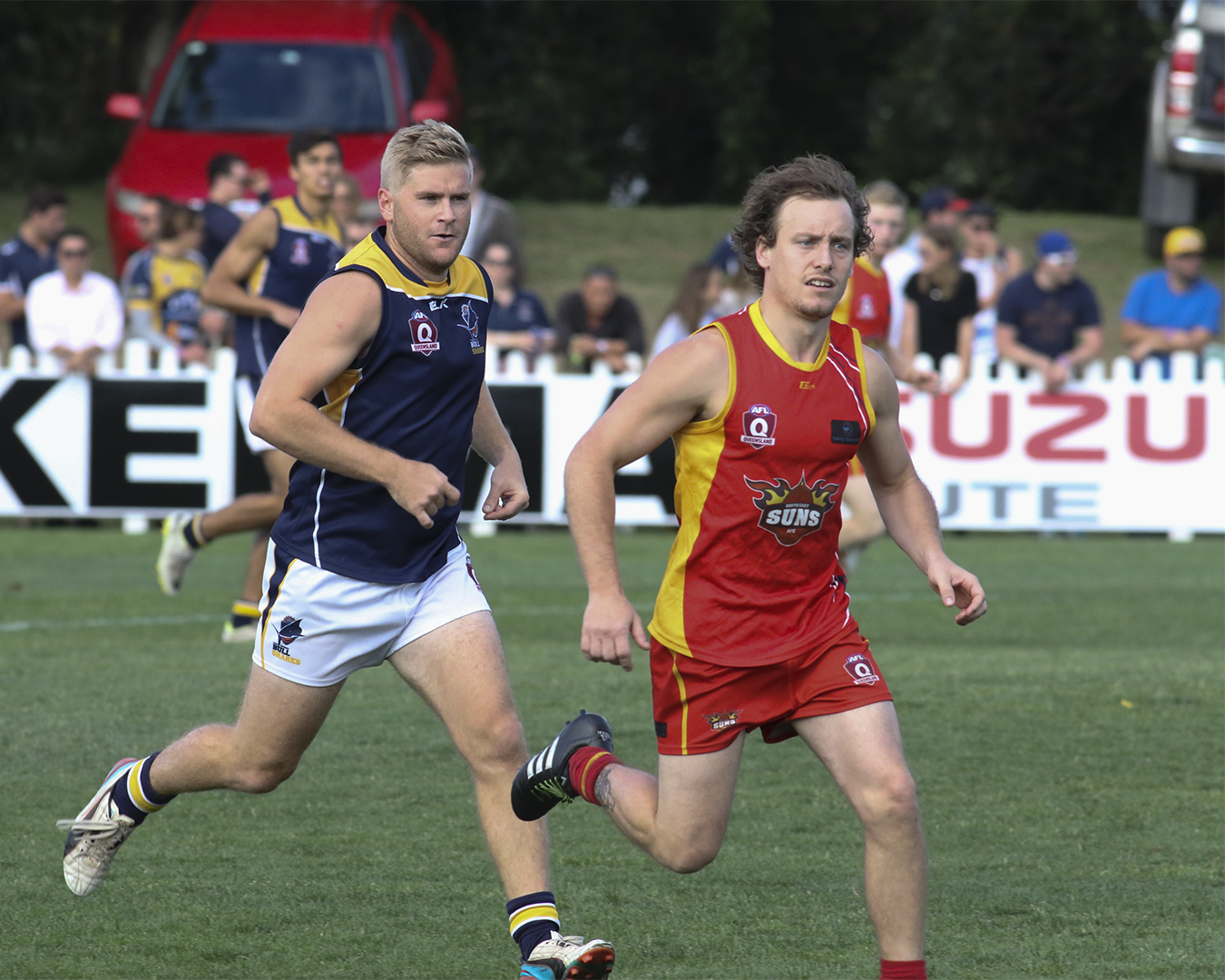
Man-on-man

- Man-on-man: the "traditional" defensive style of a defender playing close to an opposition forward. cf. zone-off.
- Man on the mark: see on the mark.
- Mark: a clean catch of the ball after it has been kicked by another player (either by a teammate or by the opposition), before it has touched the ground, or been touched by any other player, and after it has travelled a minimum of 15 metres. The term also refers to the spot on the ground where the mark or free kick took place.
- Melee: an unacceptable gathering of players involved in deliberate physical contact. Can lead to suspensions and fines.
- Metres gained: the total number of metres that a player moves the ball towards their goal in a game. Often used as a measure of a player's effectiveness.
- Midfield: the area on an Australian rules football field located between the two 50-metre arcs.
- Midfielder: a player who roams and plays within the midfield.
- "Mine!": a call by the field umpire when the football is caught in a contest and, in the opinion of the umpire, the ball can not escape the contest. The umpire will then perform a ball-up to recommence play.
- Minor (score): to score a behind. cf. major.
- Minor premiers: term for the team at the top of the ladder before the start of the finals series, not to be confused with premiers.
- Mongrel: a tumbling, awkward-looking kick.
- Mosquito fleet: a tactic sometimes employed by teams of using a number of small, quick, agile players, particularly in the forward line to try to win ground balls and score with a lot of running shots and snaps. Usually used when the team lacks sufficient key marking forwards.
- Mulligan: borrowed from the golf term, in Australian rules football, it is most commonly applied when a strong team has a bad game, meaning that a single poor performance is not to be regarded as indicative of the general abilities of the team. May be applied to a good player in the same way.
- "My ball!": see "Mine!"

== N ==
- Noise of affirmation: a generally accepted observation that a team with a significant majority of crowd support, generally a home team, will tend to gain more favourable treatment from the umpires due to the crowd response, i.e., the noise generated by the crowd affirms umpiring decisions that favour the home side or go against the away side.
- Norm Smith Medal: a medal awarded to the best player on ground in the AFL grand final, usually by someone from the winning side. Colloquially referred to as Norm.
- "Not 15!": a call by the field umpire when the football has been kicked less than 15 metres, indicating that a mark will not be awarded from that kick. Previously "not 10!" before a change in law increased the minimum distance for a mark from 10 to 15 metres.
- Nuffy: an obsessive fan of a particular team, especially one prone to making ill-informed, absurd, or foolish statements.
- Nuggety: refers to a short and stocky player, or a player who makes the most of a limited skill set.
- Nut: colloquialism for the ball.

== O ==
- Odd bounce: In part due to the shape of the ball, where its rotation or spin induces an unexpected bounce direction.
- Off the ball: a physical confrontation between two or more opposing players away from the main contest.
- Off the side of the boot: a kick that misses the proper top surface of the boot (between arch and toe) and is hit with the sloping angle of the foot resulting in a deflected or winged shot.
- Omit/omitted: to demote a player from the team for a later game due to poor form or errors. Commonly used in the past tense, it is a more formal way of saying dropped. See also managed.
- On the ball: a player who is not in any set position but who follows the ball all over the ground; also known as a follower or on-baller, and not the direct opposite of off the ball.

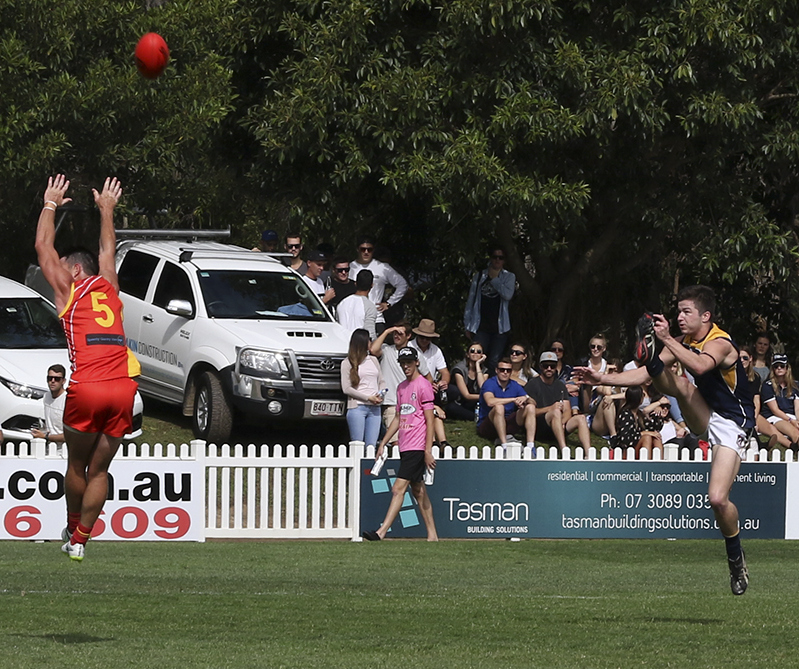
The player on the left is on the mark

- On the mark: the defensive player who stands where an opponent took a mark or received a free kick. When the opponent takes the kick, the player on the mark typically leaps vertically with their arms held straight in the air in an attempt to block the kick. For this reason, the opponent is often forced to take the kick from several metres further back to ensure the kick is not blocked.
- On the pine: see bench.
- One-eyed: an obsessive supporter that only sees things through the lens of their own team.
- One-percenter: a defensive act such as a block, bump, shepherd, smother or chase; one-percenters very rarely show up in any typical statistical analysis of a game, but are generally highly valued by coaches, supporters and spectators alike.
- Open: a player, particularly a forward, that has gotten free of opponents and is available to receive delivery of an uncontested possession.
- Out: when players on an attacking team are free of direct opponents, making it easy to move the ball quickly towards goal. Similar to open, but 'open' usually refers to specific individuals, while 'out' refers to multiple players, e.g., 'the Bulls are out all over the place at the moment'. Also used when a team have been trapped in defence, but finally manage to get the ball to some open players downfield, e.g., 'the Bulls are out now'.
- Outback kick: a kick into open space for a teammate to run towards.
- Out on the full: a kick that travels across the boundary line without first being touched by a player or hitting the ground. This will result in a free kick to the opposition team, taken by the player closest to the point at which the ball crossed the boundary line.
- Out the back: to wait down behind a flying pack of players and collect a ball that has spilled behind them, in particular when done by an attacking player near goals which may allow the player 'out the back' a fairly easy shot on goal.
- Outer, the: the area outside the field of play where spectators sit or stand.
- Outside midfielder: a midfielder who receives most of their possessions in an uncontested manner, and often gets to position to receive handpasses from inside midfielders.
- Oval: the ground on which an Australian rules football game is played. Derived from the common shape of the ground.
- Over the line: as called when any part of the football goes over the boundary line.
- Over the mark: a player from either team who crosses from their side of the mark when a free kick is being taken is said to have gone over the mark. If the attacking player does this, they are told to play on; a defending player who does this is penalised with a fifty metre penalty.
- Overlap: when the attacking team manages to outnumber the defending team, so that as the player with the ball draws an opponent to try to stop them that frees up the next player to receive the ball uncontested, and so on, allowing quick and effective movement of the ball forward.

== P ==
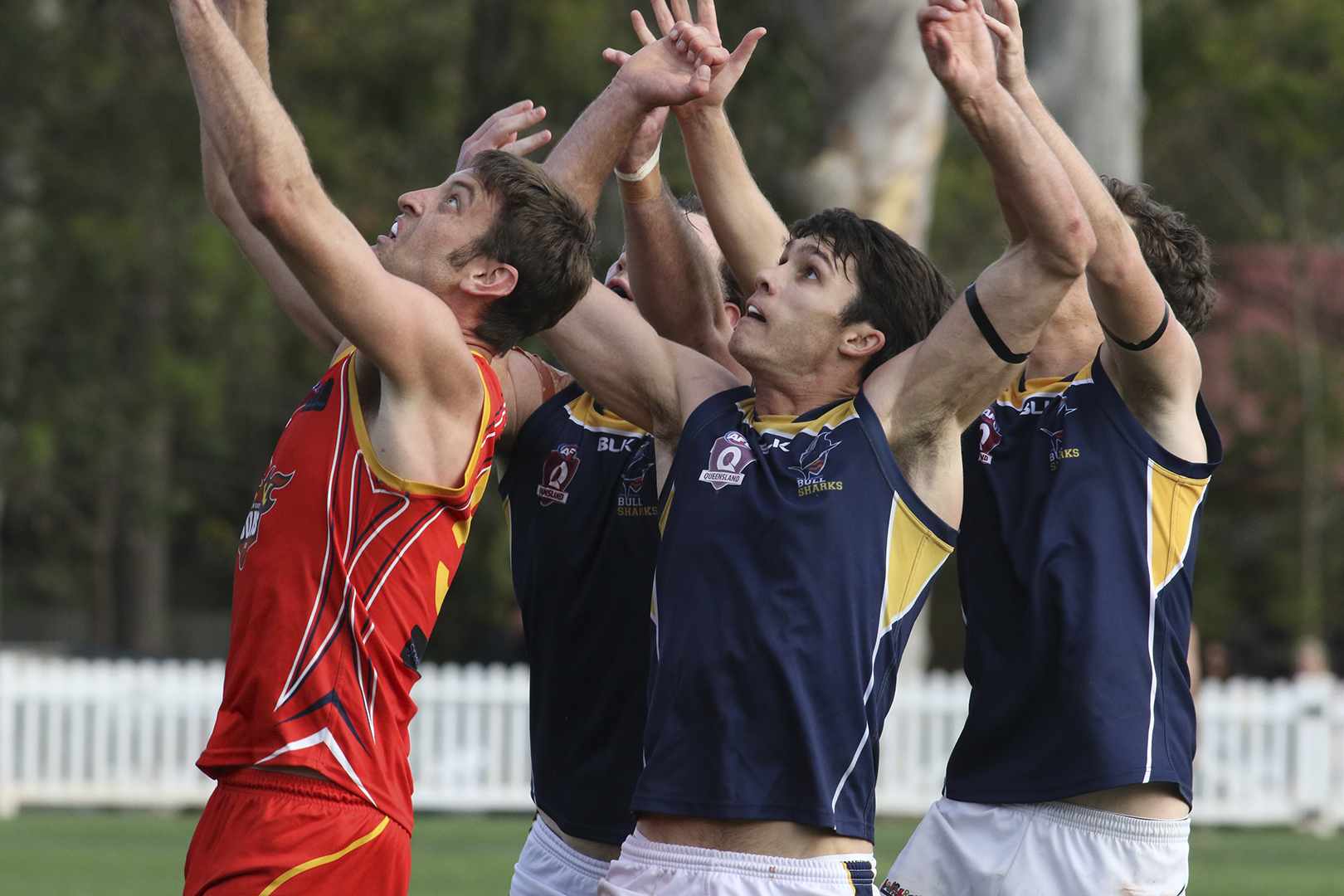
Pack of players leaping for the ball

- Pack: a mass of players from both sides all attempting to get the ball at the same time. Can be used for players flying for a mark or scrambling for the ball at ground level.
- Paddock: an Australian rules football field. Can also refer to a player having a large, open area of the field to themselves, e.g., 'he has a paddock to run in'.
- Pagan's paddock: a tactic which involved clearing all attacking players from the attacking 50 metres and kicking the ball into the resulting open space. This gave key forwards room to run into, often running with the flight of the ball toward goal. Named after, and employed by, North Melbourne coach Denis Pagan in order to fully utilise key forward Wayne Carey in the 1990s.
- Pass: a kick that ends with the ball in the possession of a teammate.
- Percentage: an indication of the ratio of points scored for versus points scored against. The AFL uses the formula (points for / points against) × 100, meaning that percentages may exceed 100%; the SANFL uses the formula (points for / points for and against) × 100. It is used as a tiebreaker for ladder positions if teams are on equal premiership points.

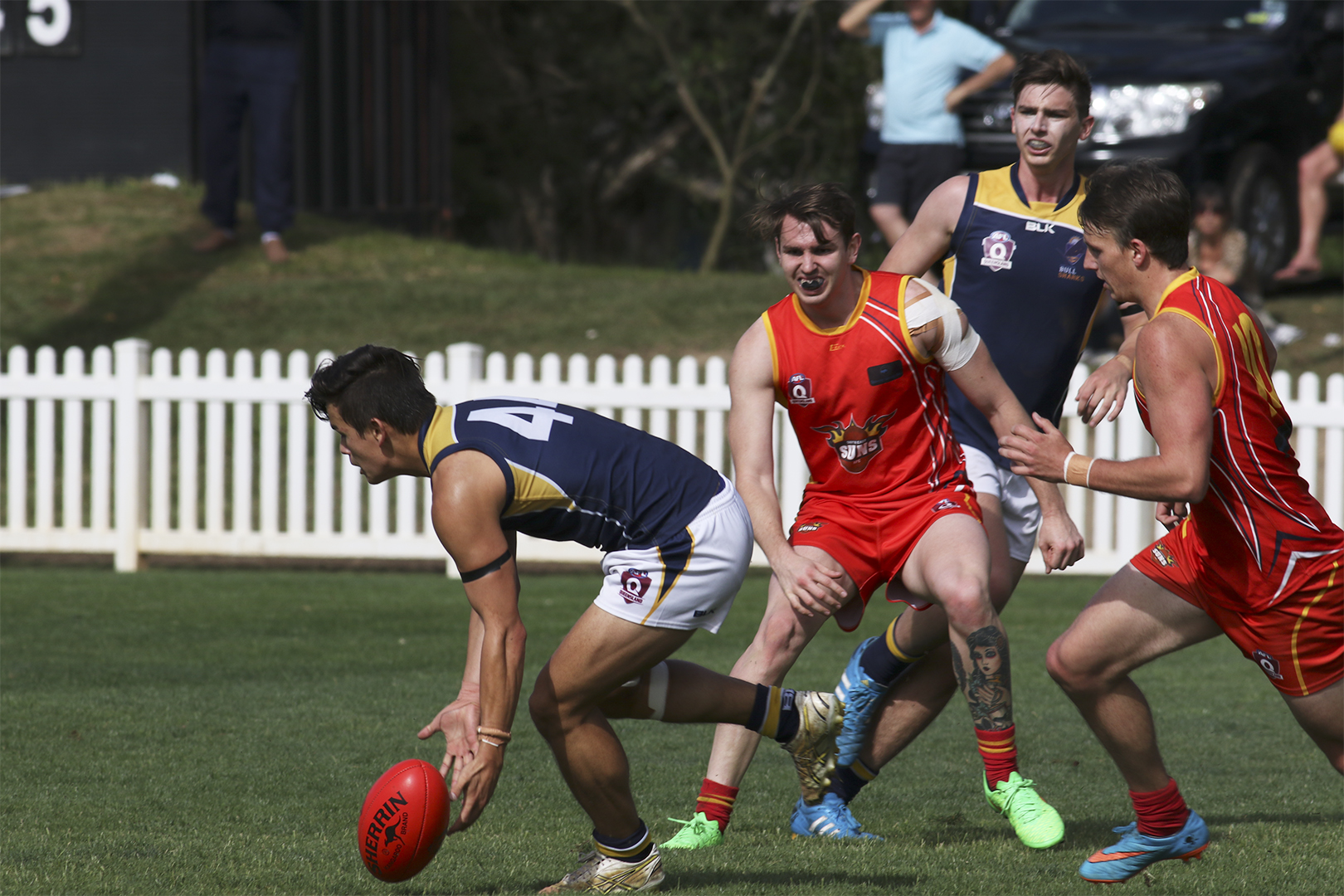
Player performing a pick-up on the run

- Perceived pressure: having the team possessing the ball commit errors or turnovers even when no direct pressure is present due to the opposition team having applied a sustained period of actual pressure.
- Pick-up: when applied to the ball it is collecting a loose ball off the ground; when applied to a player it is assigning a player a role to stick with an opposition player, especially one that is having an impact on the game.
- Pill: colloquialism for the ball.
- Ping: to attempt a shot at goal, e.g., 'have a ping'.
- Pinged: a player who is penalised by an umpire for breaking a rule.
- Playmaker: a player who directs a team play by action or deed during a game.
- "Play on!": the call made by an umpire whenever a player who is taking a mark or a free kick runs or handpasses rather than kicking over the mark; or, the call made by an umpire to alert players that a mark or free kick will not be paid, when they may be expecting that one would be paid.
- Pocket: an indicative part of the ground, equivalent to the area proscribed by an imaginary arc running from the goal post to a point on the boundary line halfway to the fifty-metre arc. There are two pockets at each end of the ground, referred to as the left and right, forward and back pockets, e.g. left-forward pocket.
- Point: the basic scoring unit. Used for both the total score (10 goals, 8 behinds, 68 points) and can be used interchangeably with behind ("The player's shot for goal missed and was only a point").
- Possession: when a player grabs the ball and takes control of it. Includes ground ball gets, marks, handball receives, effective contested knock-ons, and frees for.
- Poster: see hit the post.
- Premiers: the team that wins the premiership in any given year.
- Premiership: the award given to the winning team in the grand final. See flag.
- Premiership cup: a large metal cup awarded to the team that wins the premiership.
- Premiership medal: a medal awarded to each player that plays in a premiership team, as well as the coach.
- Premiership player: any player that has played in a premiership-winning team; this does not have to be the current or reigning premiers.
- Premiership quarter: a colloquialism for the third quarter of a match, where a game is often said to be decided.
- Premiership window: the range of years that a team has a likely and realistic chance of winning the premiership.
- Pressure: to challenge the team possessing the ball by way of techniques such as tackling and corralling to try to force an error or turnover.
- Prior opportunity: (sometimes shortened to prior) a player who has had the ball for long enough to make a reasonable attempt to dispose of it before being tackled is said to have had prior opportunity. This is important for holding the ball decisions, where a player who has had prior opportunity must dispose of the ball immediately, while a player who has had "no prior" has a few extra seconds to dispose of the ball.
- Protected zone: an imaginary corridor 10 metres to either side of a player who is taking a free kick, into which no players from either team are permitted to be.
- Punter: a fan of the game, in particular a regular member of the general public. While in general Australian parlance a punter is a person that gambles, in Australian football terms this does not have to be the case.
- Push in the back: a free kick awarded to a player for being unfairly pushed out of the action or to the ground via contact to the back.

== Q ==
- QClash: the intrastate Queensland derby played between the Brisbane Lions and Gold Coast.
- Quarter: a period of play. Each game is divided into four quarters of equal length. Quarters in the AFL and most other senior competitions last 20 minutes plus time-on.
- Quarter-time: the gap between the first and second quarters.

== R ==
- Race, the: the passageway that leads from the change rooms to the playing field.
- Rainmaker: a ball that is kicked very high, but which does not travel very far.
- Raking: a kicking style that results in long kicks.
- Rattle the woodwork: see hit the post.

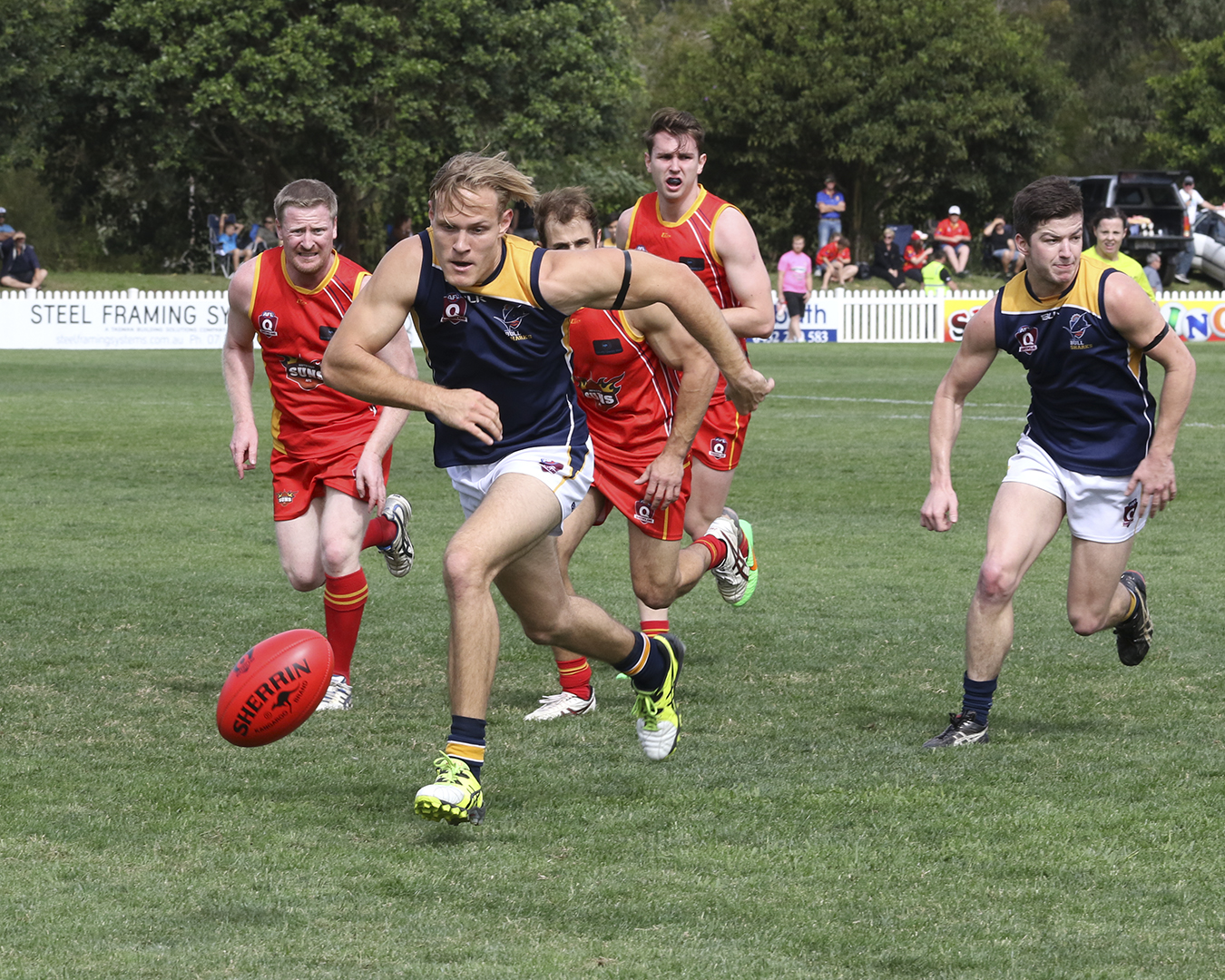
Player reading the ball

- Reading the ball: judging the ball's movement as it flies through the air or bounces along the ground.
- Rebound: the act of moving the ball forward after winning it as the result of a turnover in the defensive end of the ground.
- Rebound defender: a defender whose key role is to facilitate rebounds, they are often quick smaller players with good kicks.
- Rebound-50: the act of moving the ball from the defensive 50-metre zone into the midfield.
- Recycled player: a player unwanted by his original team who continues his career at a second club.
- Rebuild: the process of redeveloping a team once it is understood they have passed their premiership window by cutting existing players, recruiting players from other clubs, and drafting and developing new players. It often also involves changes in coaching staff and even administration staff. Teams being rebuilt often spend a number of years towards the bottom of the ladder.
- Rebuild on the run (also 'rebuild on the fly'): a rebuild of a team done without the team substantially dropping down the ladder, possibly while even remaining in the premiership window.
- Red time: the final few minutes of playing time in any quarter.
- Reigning premiers: the team that won the previous year's premiership; the title is maintained until a new premier is crowned.
- Reserves: the second team for a club, usually playing in a lower-level competition. Often called the ressies, seconds, or twos.
- Reported: the state of a player after an umpire has written their name into a notebook, during play, for an act that may result in the player being suspended.
- Robbed: used by fans to describe a team that loses the game, usually when leading in the final minutes, due to unfavourable decisions made by the umpire.
- Rocket handball: a handball technique which causes the ball spins backwards in the air in the same fashion as a drop punt. It was pioneered by Kevin Sheedy and is now the most common handball technique in modern football. It is considered the most effective style of handball in terms of distance and accuracy, although it can take longer to execute than other styles.
- Role player: a player not generally regarded as a star, but who is given a specific role to fulfil for the team, which may not involve getting many possessions. This usually leads to them being undervalued externally, but they may be highly valued internally. Reliable role players are usually vital for high-level success.
- Rookie: a player who is on an AFL club's playing list, but who cannot play senior games unless replacing a long-term injured or retired player.
- Roost: a long kick.
- Rotation: a planned interchange designed to minimise fatigue of midfielders.
- Round: a week or a stage of matches in a regular season.
- Rover: a small inside midfielder. Historically one of three distinct followers, but the term is now rarely used.
- Rubbed out: colloquialism for being suspended.
- Rub of the green: to be seen to be getting favourable treatment by the umpires, or more loosely, to get significantly more free kicks than the opposition team.
- Ruck: (or ruckman) a tall player who contests the ball-up or throw-in.
- Ruck-rover: a midfielder halfway between a ruck and a rover. Historically one of the three distinct followers, but now rarely used.
- Run-and-carry: a playing style which favours collecting the ball and running with it rather than looking for an immediate disposal. A 'run-and-carry player' is a player who favours this style by default. Teams may also adopt run-and-carry as a favoured game style depending on their personal, or as a tactic against certain opposition.
- Run through the mark: (or "run across the mark"), when a player runs between the player on the mark and the player who is taking a free kick. If a defending player does this, and they are not immediately following their direct opponent, a 50-metre penalty will be awarded.

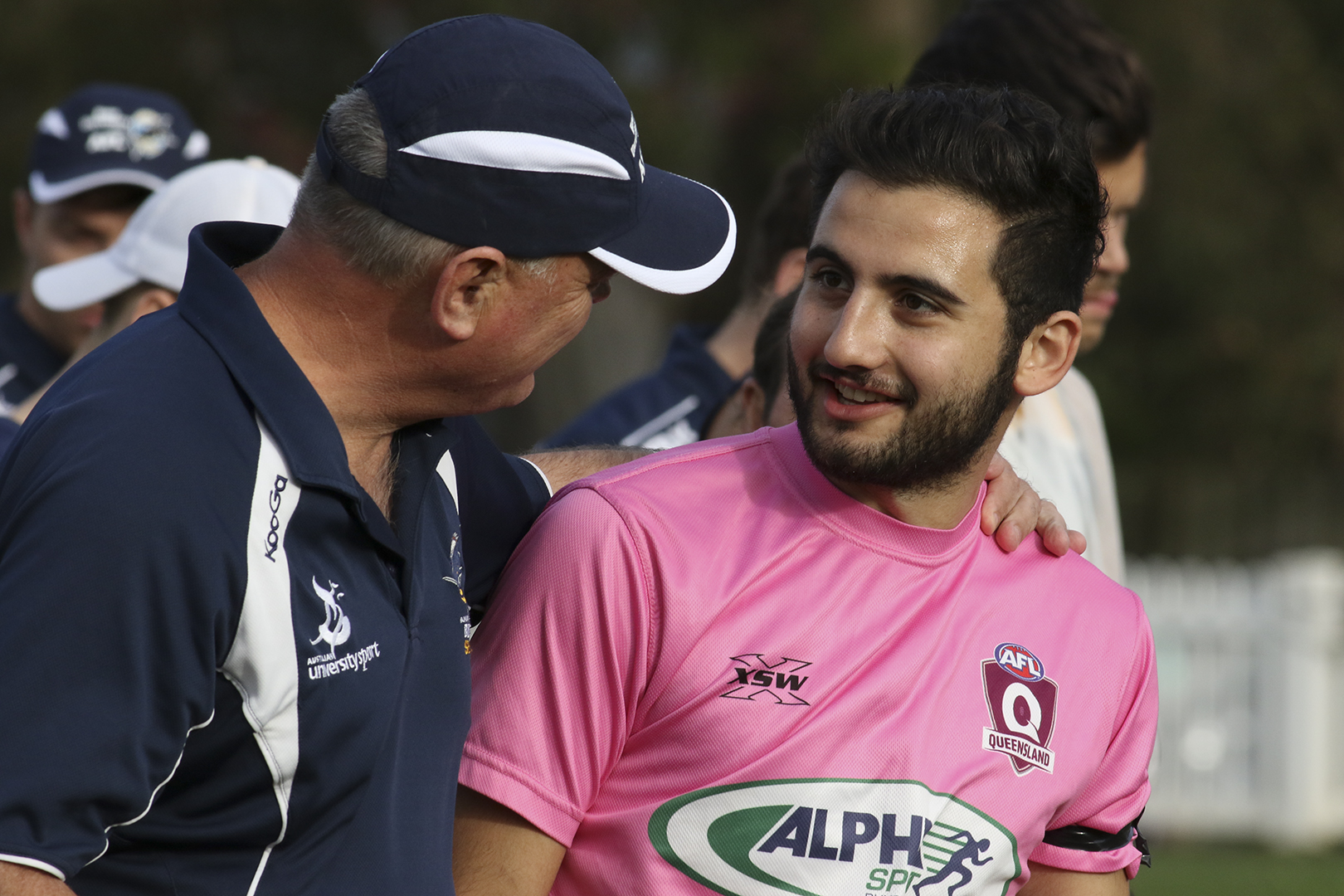
Runner (right) with his team's coach

- Runner: a club official whose job is to run onto the ground to give the players messages from the coach during play. Runners were traditionally able to enter the field of play at any time. While this remains the case in most senior football, since 2019, runners in the AFL have only been able to enter the field after a goal has been kicked and must exit before play restarts.
- Running bounce: (or simply bounce) the act of a player bouncing the football on the ground and back to himself while running, which must be done once every 15 metres.
- Run-with (player or role): a player who is assigned the role of picking up a prominent opposition player to try to limit their impact on the game. See also tagger.
- Rushed behind: the concession of a behind for the opposition team. A behind which is deemed to have been deliberately rushed by a player under no pressure is penalised by a free kick, but in all other circumstances it concedes one point.

== S ==
- Sausage roll: rhyming slang for goal, often shortened to "sausage" (also called a snag, from the Australian slang term for a sausage).
- Saw tooth: a team tactic of continually changing the direction of the ball as it advances down the field.
- Scoreboard pressure: to place pressure on an opposition team by scoring and opening up a significant lead. Often used in the pejorative, i.e., a team may dominate play but fail to put "scoreboard pressure" on their opposition by failing to score well or through inaccuracy, thus wasting their dominance and making a comeback more likely.
- Scrag: to tackle or dispatch with an opponent in a rough, unruly manner.
- Screamer: see spectacular mark.
- Screw punt: see torpedo punt.
- Scrubber: a type of slider.
- Season: a year of a competition.
- Selling candy: see baulk.
- September: a reference to the AFL finals series, which traditionally take place across the month of September.
- Set shot: an attempt to kick a goal from a mark or a free kick. See shot.
- Shank: to badly mess up a kick, often a set shot on goal; so called as the ball may come off the lower leg or shank rather than cleanly off the foot.
- Shark: obtaining possession of the ball, often in a difficult position, particularly from the hitout of the opposing ruck.
- Shepherd: a block placed on an opposing player. This can be to stop them tackling the blocking player's teammate in possession of the ball, or attempting to gather it; to stop them intercepting a ball heading for goal; or just to stop them possessing the ball themselves.
- Sherrin: a reference to the ball. Sherrin is the official manufacturer of balls for the professional game, and the most widely used and sold brand beyond this.
- Shirtfront: an aggressive front-on bump.
- Shot: an attempt to kick a goal.
- Showdown: the intrastate South Australian derby played between Adelaide and Port Adelaide.
- Siren: a loud sound used to signal the start and end of the game, and the start and end of each quarter.
- Sit: the best position from which to take a mark. Usually used in the structure "to have the sit".
- Sitter: a very easy mark; usually used in the negative, when such a mark is missed, e.g., "He's dropped a sitter".
- Sledge: to trash talk an opponent.
- Slider: a low, flat kick that hits the ground and slides rather than bouncing. cf. dribble, grubber, wormburner.
- Slingshot: also, end-to-end, a goal where the ball is moved from one end of the field to the other in a short amount of time.
- Sling tackle: a method of tackling where the opponent is spun around and thrown heavily to the ground, particularly if they are unable to use their arms to help protect themselves in the fall. It has since been outlawed due to the risks of concussion.

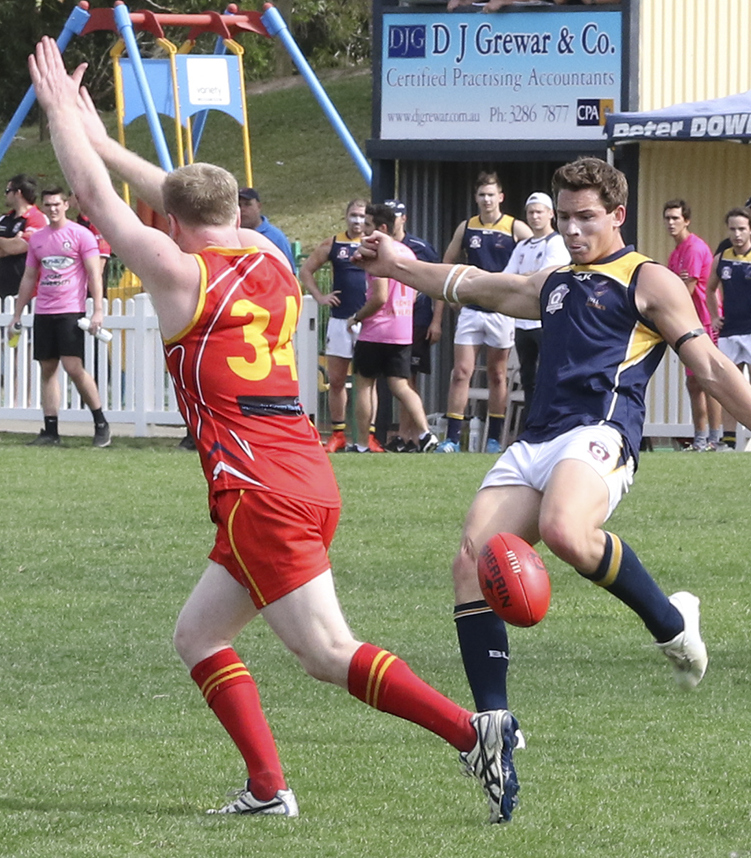
A player prepares to smother an opponent's kick.

- Smother: the act of stopping a kick immediately after it leaves the boot. Generally undertaken with the hands or body.
- Snap: a shot at goal, usually executed under pressure from an unlikely scoring position. It is almost invariably a kick across the body (i.e., for a right footer, a kick aimed to far left) and typically exaggerates the natural tendency of the ball to drift slightly right to left from a right-footer, and left to right from the left-footer. It is, in this way, the reverse of a checkside or banana.
- Snag: see sausage roll.
- Soccer: verb used to describe kicking the ball off the ground without first taking the ball in the hands, as is the primary means of disposal in the sport of soccer.
- Spearhead: a particularly adept goalkicker; in particular, it references the key forward on a team who would usually be one of the competition's leading goalkickers over a number of seasons.

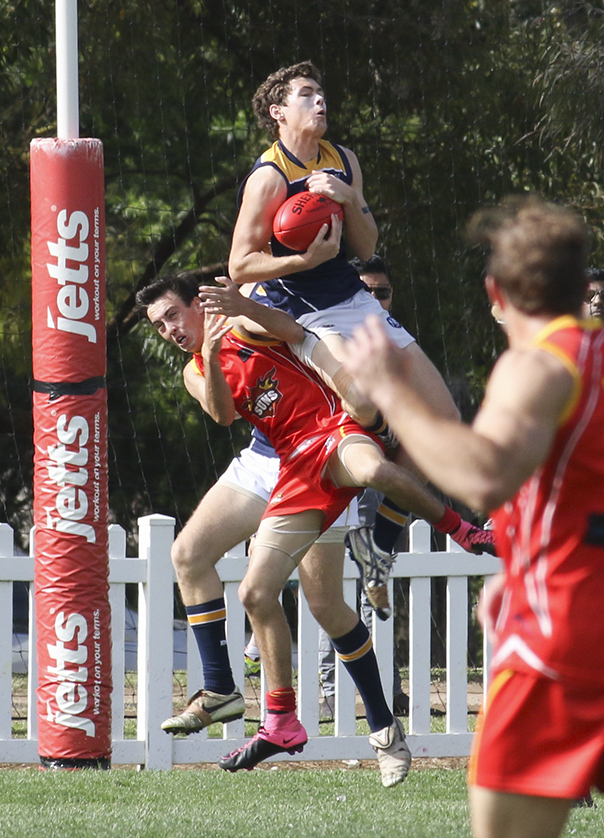
A player takes a spectacular mark.

- Spectacular mark: also known as a specky, speccie, screamer or hanger. Generally refers to the act of leaping onto another player's back or shoulders to take a high mark, usually in a contested situation.
- Spell: to be interchanged off the ground, e.g., to "have a spell".
- Spillage: occurs when a ball comes off the top of a pack of players attempting to mark the ball.
- Spine: an imaginary line running between the goals at either end of the ground. Often used to refer to the key positions down the ground, i.e., full-back, centre half-back, centre, centre half-forward, and full-forward.
- Spoil: a punch or slap of the ball which hinders an opposition player from taking a mark.

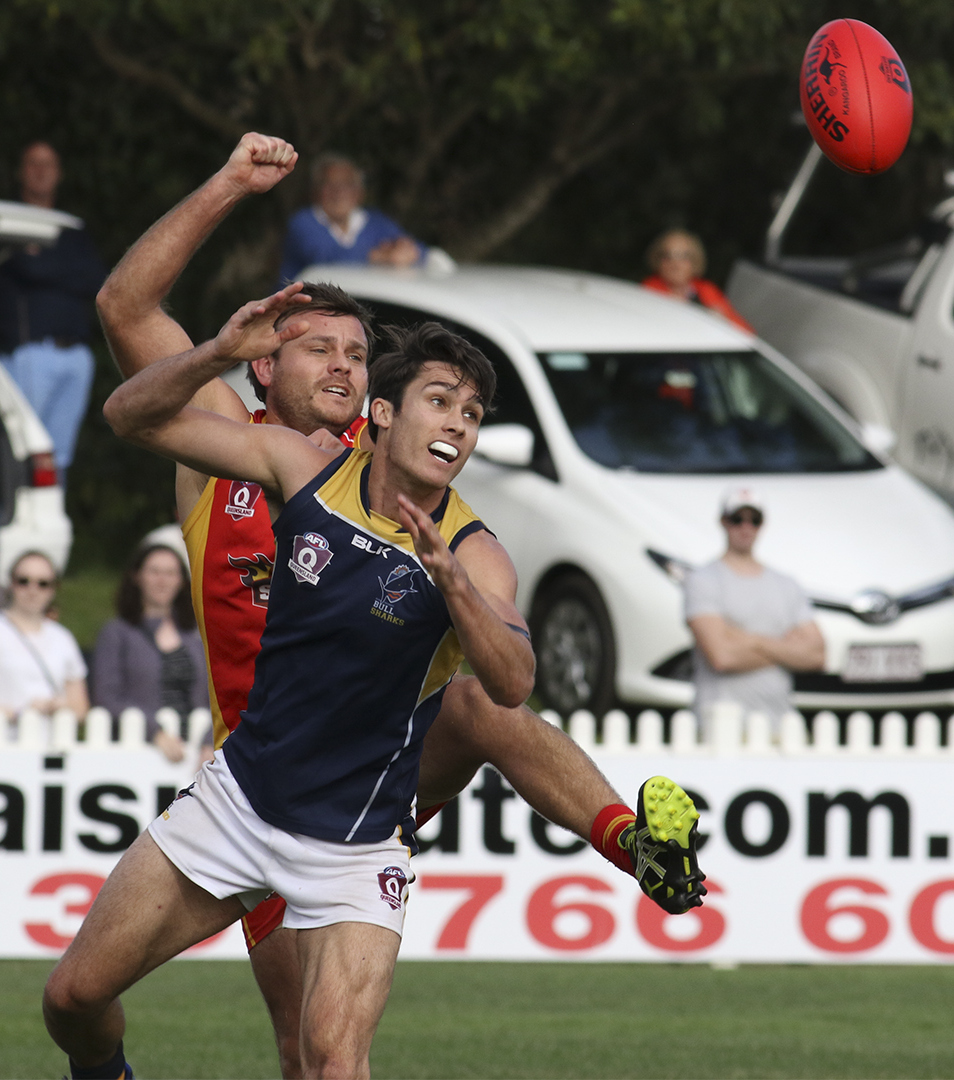
A player prepares to Spoil an opponent's mark attempt by punching the ball.

- Spray: severe scolding of players by their coach.
- Spray (a shot): a poorly executed kick at goal that comes "off the side of the boot" and produces a point.
- Stab pass: a short kick that travels very low to the ground to a teammate. Until the 1970s, this was usually a stab kick (a type of abbreviated drop kick) or a stab punt; both now largely replaced by a short drop punt.
- Stacks on the mill (or stacks on): a stand-alone statement made by commentators to indicate that the ball is covered by a large pack of players on the ground and is unable to move.
- Stand!; an instruction by a field umpire to a player to stand (and not move) until player's opponent has taken an awarded (free) kick or until the umpire has called out "play on!".
- Stay-at-home: term used for a player (typically the full-forward or, less often, defender) that rarely leaves their area of the ground.
- Stepladder: colloquially, the player upon whose shoulders another player jumps to take a specky.
- Sticks: see goal posts. To "find the big sticks" is to score a goal.
- Stoppage: when play stops for a ball up or a throw in.
- Stops: see studs.
- Studs: small projections on the bottom of the boots which help players better grip the turf.
- Studs-up: to fly for a mark in such a way that the studs may cause injury to another player. If this is deemed a deliberate action a free kick penalty may be applied.
- Substitute: an interchange player who cannot be freely interchanged, but may be brought onto the ground to replace a player for the rest of a game.
- Super goal: a goal which scores nine points instead of six, earned by kicking a goal from beyond a set distance, usually 50 metres. Once used in the AFL pre-season competition from 2003 to 2016, it is now seen nearly exclusively in exhibition games.
- Suspended: a player who has been denied permission to play for a set time by a legislated tribunal. See reported.
- Sweeper: a player who plays loose across the half-back line in order to connect the backline and midfield.
- Switch: to move the ball laterally across the ground, hoping to find an easier path to the forward line.
- Sydney Derby: the intrastate New South Wales derby played between Sydney and Greater Western Sydney. The match was initially marketed as the "Battle of the Bridge".

== T ==
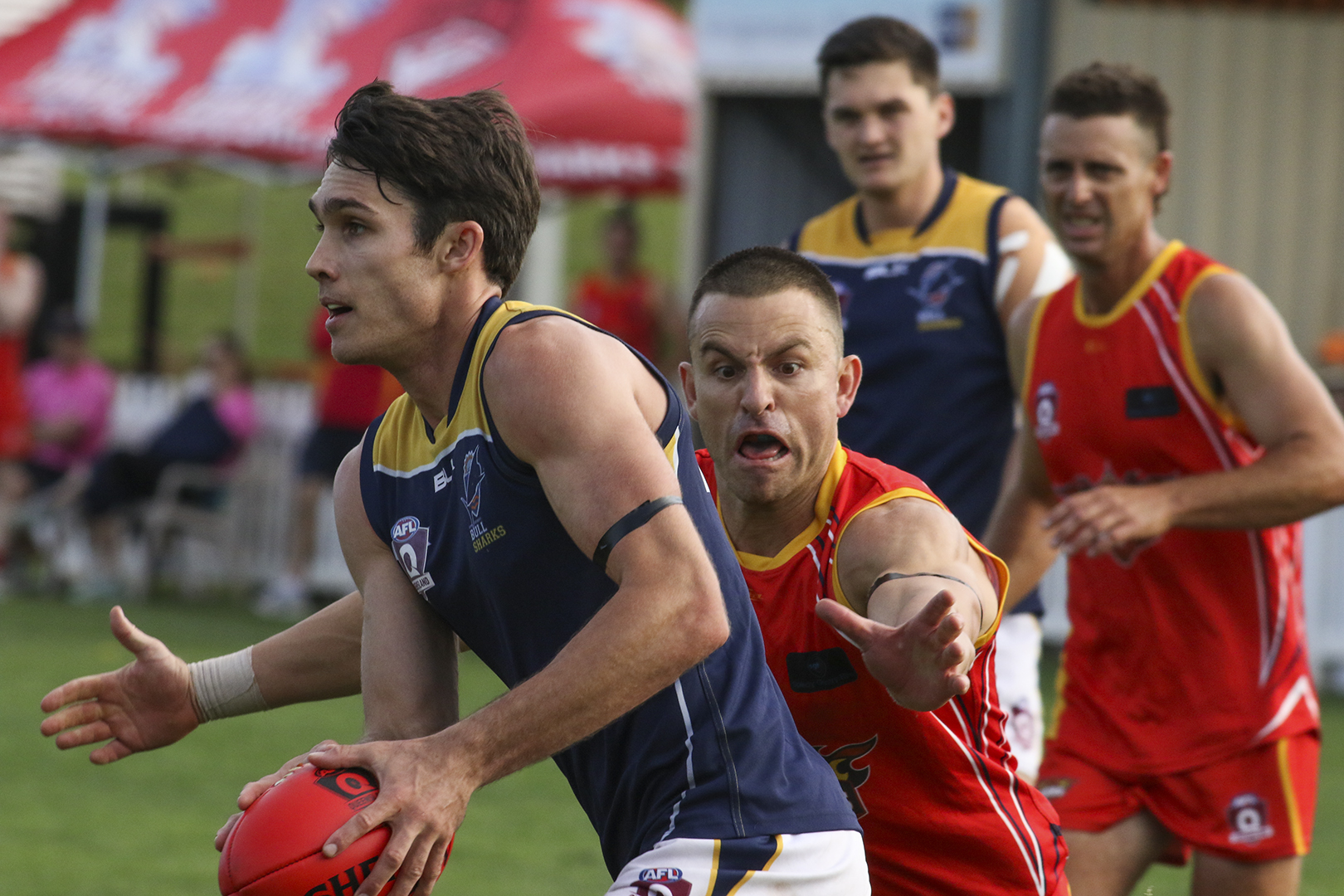
Player lunging to tackle an opponent in possession of the ball

- Tackle: the grabbing of an opposition player in possession of the ball, in order to impede their progress or to force them to dispose of the ball quickly.
- Tagger: a defensive player whose task is to prevent an opposition midfielder from having an impact on the game.
- Tap: see hitout.
- Tapout: see hitout.
- Tap ruckman: a ruckman who is particularly good at winning the hitouts, especially one who can successfully tap it to his teammates on a regular basis.
- Term: colloquialism for quarter.
- The Club: a 1980 film, based on a play of the same name, following the fortunes of a fictional Australian football club, loosely based on and filmed in conjunction with the Collingwood Football Club.
- Thin side: an imaginary area of the ground that indicates the least space occupied by the greatest number of players. cf. fat side.
- Third man up: (or simply third man) a player other than the nominal ruckman who unexpectedly enters a ruck contest to effect a hitout. The laws of the game were altered in 2017 to disallow this tactic.
- Thrash: to defeat an opposition team very soundly. See also flog, kill.
- Three-peat: to win three premierships in a row. Also sometimes termed 'back-to-back-to-back'.
- Three-quarter-time: the break between the third and fourth quarters.
- Throw: an illegal disposal of a ball by hand. Will result in a free kick to the opposition.
- Throw-in: see boundary throw-in.
- Time-on: time added onto the end of each quarter to compensate for time lost during general play by stoppages. The amount of time to be added on is determined by independent time-keepers who stop the game clock when indicated by the central umpires. Lower grade and lower age-group competitions will often be played without time-on.
- Tip/tips: the team or teams that one thinks will win a certain game or in a certain round. A 'tipping competition' involves fans competing against each other over the season to see who can get the most tips correct.
- Torpedo: (colloq. screwie, torp or barrel) a punt kick that rotates the ball around its long axis, which is aligned with the direction the ball is travelling. Regarded as the type of kick with the longest distance, but the lowest chance of being accurate.
- Touch: colloquialism for possession or disposal.
- Touched: indicates that a ball was touched by another player after being kicked; such a kick cannot result in a mark, a goal, or an out of bounds on the full free kick.
- Tribunal: a judicial system where players can contest on-field charges arising from their matches; the AFL Tribunal is the most well-known.
- Trip: a low tackle which will result in a free kick to the opposition. Furthermore, tripping or attempting to trip an opponent with the foot or leg will lead to a player being reported.
- Tunnelling: bumping the lower part of the body of an airborne player attempting a mark with the intention of unbalancing them.
- Turnover: the loss of possession of the ball to the opposition.

== U ==
- Umpire: one of the enforcers of the laws and adjudicators of play. Often abbreviated to ump or umpy.
- Uncontested possession: a possession achieved without having to engage in a contest.
- Underground handball: a handball that is deliberately handballed to the ground and bounced to a teammate, usually to pass under an opposition player. Similar to a 'bounce pass' in basketball, but much harder to execute due to the shape of the ball, and the fact that the ball has to be hit rather than thrown to the ground. It is therefore quite rare and usually only done by highly skilled players.
- "Up there, Cazaly": a catchcry popularised in the early twentieth century referring to the prodigious leap of Roy Cazaly, but also used more generally as a cry of encouragement. In 1979, it was turned into a promotional song that has remained popular ever since, including being a mainstay of pregame entertainment at the AFL Grand Final.
- Utility: classification for a player that can play numerous roles and/or positions.

== V ==
- Vic bias: a perceived favoritism shown by the AFL towards Victorian-based teams, particularly in terms of scheduling, media coverage, and venue allocations.

== W ==
- Western Derby: the intrastate Western Australian derby played between Fremantle and West Coast. Often referred to as just the 'derby' in Western Australia.
- Wheel and go: when a player takes a mark or gains a free kick, but rather than holding up play, quickly gathers the ball and plays on, continuing the forward push of the team.
- Wing: an indicative area of the ground that lies between the forward and back flanks on both sides of the centre. There are two wings on the ground.
- Winger: a player who is positioned on the wing.
- With the flight: a player who marks the ball as they run in the direction the ball is travelling.
- Wooden spoon: the mock 'award' said to be received by the team that finished last on the ladder at the end of a season.
- Woodwork: the four posts at either end of the ground, particularly used in reference to the goalposts.
- Worm burner: a very low, hard kick that travels its entire distance very close to the ground. The name implies that it is so low and hard that it would endanger earthworms. See also daisy cutter, cf. grubber.

== X ==
- X-factor: the unique talents of some players beyond what can be described by the standard skill-set of kicking, marking, etc.

== Y ==
- Young gun: a fairly new player to the competition (especially on the younger end) that shows skills or talent beyond what would be expected of a player with their limited experience.

== Z ==
- Zone: any of three individual areas on a football field: the defensive zone is located within the 50-metre arc closest to the opposition's goals, the midfield zone is between the two 50-metre arcs, and the forward zone refers to the area within the 50-metre arc closest to that team's goals.
- Zone off: the act of a defender leaving some space between themselves and their opponent. This is contrary to the typical defensive style of man-on-man.
