= Rushed behind =

Method of scoring in Australian rules football

In Australian rules football, a rushed behind occurs when the ball passes through the goalposts and was last touched by a defending player. A rushed behind scores one point for the attacking team, but it also prevents the attacking team from scoring a goal, worth six points.

A rushed behind typically occurs when a defending player touches the ball after it has been kicked and as it heads toward the goal; by touching the ball, the defender ensures that the attacking team scores only one point rather than the full six. It may be less risky for a defending player in possession of the ball to deliberately concede a rushed behind rather than try to prevent any score outright. A deliberately rushed behind results in a free kick to the opposing side unless under immediate pressure—a rule implemented in the 2009 AFL season. If the ball is kicked by an attacker and touched by another player simultaneously, it is considered rushed.

Rushed behinds are statistically credited to no player; scoresheets will simply include the tally of total rushed behinds credited to a team's score. This is comparable to extras (a.k.a. sundries) in cricket.

It is impossible for a defending team to directly concede a "rushed goal" worth six points. In other words, if a player kicks what would be the equivalent of an own goal in soccer, only one point is conceded.

== Free kick for conceding a deliberate rushed behind ==
Since 2009, it has been illegal in AFL matches for a defender to deliberately concede a rushed behind when he is not under any pressure from the attacking team. In the event that a defender does this, the umpire awards a free kick to the attacking team on the goal line at the spot where the defender conceded the score. The defender may still deliberately concede a rushed behind if he is under pressure from an attacker. Additionally, according to the 2024 Laws of Australian rules football, 18.11.2 (c), a ball cannot be legally rushed if they have "had time and space to dispose of the ball", which would cover a situation whereby a player waits until the umpire calls play on and then steps back over the goal/behind line or disposes it back over the goal/behind line. Furthermore, it states that a defending ruckman cannot force a rushed behind from a ruck contest, nor can a defending player concede a behind from more than nine metres away.

Two high-profile incidents during the 2008 AFL season were largely responsible for the introduction of this rule. In Round 16, Richmond's Joel Bowden rushed two behinds in a row while kicking in to use up time towards the end of their game against Essendon, reducing the margin from 6 points to 4 points but guaranteeing that Richmond would win the game. In the 2008 AFL Grand Final, Hawthorn rushed a record 11 behinds against Geelong.

Prior to the 2008 season, a variation had already been trialled in pre-season matches in which a deliberate rushed behind conceded three points instead of one; this was never introduced into premiership matches.

The new rule change, especially its early implementation, caused a lot of confusion, as many players were unsure what constituted pressure as far as the umpires were concerned, leading to some players illegally conceding a behind without pressure and giving up a free kick and near-certain goal; conversely, some players would refuse to concede a behind out of fear of giving away a free kick—even if such a concession would have been legal in that context. The rule intermittently came back into focus again between 2016 and 2018, as a change to the rule renewed the confusion. AFL Legend Kevin Bartlett said in May 2017 that the rule "lacks common sense", referring specifically to an incident where Richmond defender Jayden Short was in a footrace to the goal line with Essendon forward Josh Green. Green, unbeknownst to Short, gave up the chase, but Short conceded the behind anyway and was penalised with a free kick due to Green not applying adequate pressure in the umpire's mind to legally allow Short to rush a behind. As of 2024, there has been no amendment to the rule to allow for perceived-pressure exemptions.
