= Super goal =

Australian rules football terminology

A super goal was a method of scoring used in the Australian Football League's pre-season competition in the sport of Australian rules football, from 2003 to 2017. Under the rule, a goal scored from a distance greater than fifty metres is awarded nine points, instead of the regulation six points. The innovation is not used during the premiership season.

The super goal was introduced before the 2003 Wizard Cup. The rules governing whether or not a goal counts as a super goal are as follows:

- For a goal on the run to be considered a super goal, the grounded foot of the player at the time the ball is kicked must be entirely outside the 50-metre arc.
- If the goal is kicked from a set shot, the mark must be outside the 50 metre arc.

If a fifty-metre penalty takes the spot of a mark from outside the fifty-metre arc to inside it, teams are given two choices: take the full length of the 50 m penalty and kick for six points; or, take part of the 50 m penalty to bring the mark right onto the fifty-metre line and kick for nine points. This is to prevent a team from deliberately conceding a 50-metre penalty to prevent its opponent from taking a shot for nine points. In the same situation prior to a rule change for the 2011 NAB Cup, the full fifty-metre penalty was automatically imposed and a nine-point goal was awarded regardless of how close to goal the kick was taken from – so, under those rules, a nine-point goal could be kicked from the goal square if it followed a fifty-metre penalty; but since the change, all nine-point goals must be kicked from beyond fifty metres. There is no equivalent rule applying to downfield free kicks: if a player receives a downfield free kick inside the 50m arc as the result of an infraction which took place outside the 50m arc, the resultant set-shot is always for six points.

The umpire signal for the nine-point goal is for the field umpire to give the "all clear" and raise nine fingers to the goal umpire; the goal umpire then raises both arms into the air, followed by waving two coloured flags instead of white flags. The colour of the flags in the pre-season competition has varied, often depending on the sponsors.

Prior to the wider introduction of the video umpire for score reviews, a video umpire was made available specifically to adjudicate on whether or not a score was a super goal or not. Amendments to scores in this were generally made during the game, often at the end of a quarter, although a Super Goal awarded to Brisbane Lions midfielder Luke Power in the 2007 NAB Cup semi-final win over the Geelong Football Club was amended after the siren to a regular goal. Though this did not affect the result of the game, it caused confusion among betting agencies which had taken bets on the final margin of the game.

In addition to the AFL pre-season competition, the super goal is used in EJ Whitten Legends Games between Victoria and the All-Stars, although the distance from which the ball must be kicked is reduced to 40 metres in these games. In 1993, ten years before its use in the AFL pre-season, the Victorian Football Association briefly considered introducing the concept into its premiership season but did not proceed with the change.

The rule was abolished for the 2018 JLT Community Series, because of a desire for the pre season competition to better match the rules of the regular season. Geelong defender Andrew Mackie was the last person to kick a super goal, in the 2017 JLT Community Series.

== See also ==
- The Stars Football League and NFL Europe, both American football leagues, have used a similar concept in which field goals longer than 50 yards have been worth four points instead of three; no such rule exists at the top level of the sport.
- In cricket max, a precursor to Twenty20 cricket, two "max zones" were added to the field of play. Any runs scored by hitting the ball into the max zone scored double, so boundary eights and twelves were possible.
- In basketball, a typical field goal scores two points, but a three-point field goal is achieved by shooting from a distance.
- The fast5 variant of netball utilises a rule in which a shot from outside the goal circle may be worth two or three points instead of one, depending on its distance; shots from outside the goal circle are not permitted at all in regulation netball.
