= Free kick (Australian rules football) =

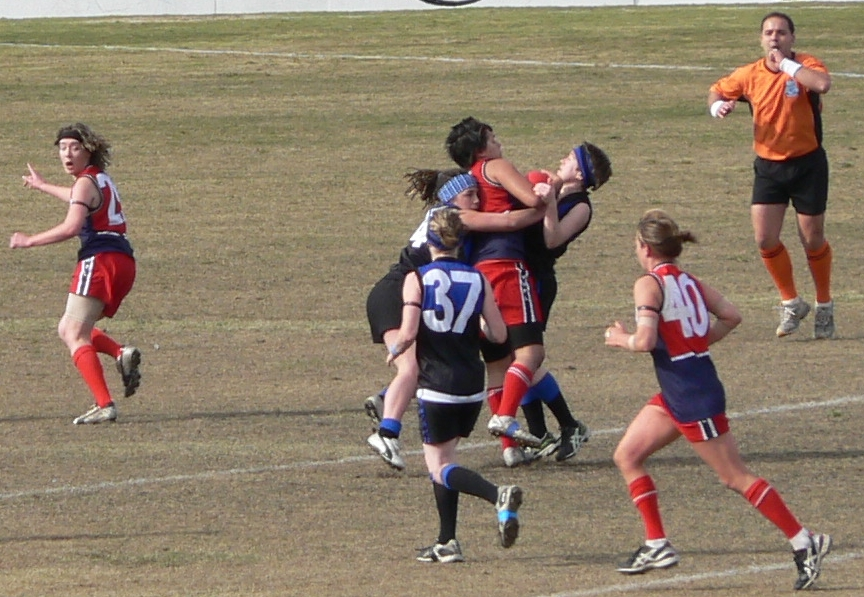
Darebin Falcons Player is wrapped up in a gang tackle by two Melbourne University opponents in the 2006 WVFL senior women's Grand Final. The field umpire (in orange) is about to signal "holding the ball" to penalise Darebin and award Melbourne University a free kick.

A free kick in Australian rules football is a penalty awarded by a field umpire to a player who has been infringed by an opponent or is the nearest player to a player from the opposite team who has broken a rule.

== Protocol ==
When a free kick is paid, the player's opponent stands the mark, by standing on the spot where the umpire indicates that the free kick was paid or mark was taken. The player with the ball then retreats backwards so that the ball can be kicked over the player standing the mark; the player must retreat on the angle such that they, the player on the mark and the centre of the attacking goal are in the same straight line.

A player receiving a free kick is not restricted to kicking the ball; they can play on by handballing to another player, or run around the mark where the free kick has been paid.

== Examples of free kicks ==
Free kicks are paid for:

- Holding the ball: when the player with the ball is tackled and cannot dispose of the ball legally despite having had a prior opportunity to do so; or when a player lying on the ground drags the ball underneath his body and does not attempt to dispose of it.
- Running too far: when the player runs with the ball for more than 15 metres but does not bounce it or touch it on the ground.
- High contact: when any other player on the field makes contact above another player's shoulders. Usually a high tackle when a tackler makes contact on above the shoulders, although an umpire may ignore the high contact if it deemed that the tackled player caused or contributed to the high contact (for example by ducking his head). A player in possession may also commit this offense when attempting a fend off.
- Holding the man: holding or tackling a player who does not have the ball.
- Tripping: when the player is tackled below the knees.
- Push in the back: pushing a player in the back is not allowed (in a marking contest, ruck duel or tackle).
- Taking or chopping the arms: attempting to spoil a mark by pulling away one's opponent's arm.
- Out on the full: when the ball is kicked and travels over the boundary line before bouncing or being touched by another player.
- Deliberate out of bounds: when the ball is put out of bounds by a player in a deliberate act or with otherwise insufficient intent to keep the ball alive.
- Deliberate rushed behind: when the ball is forced through for a rushed behind in a deliberate act and when not under direct opposition pressure.
- Throwing the ball/illegal disposal: when the ball is thrown or otherwise incorrectly disposed of, rather than handballed.
- Illegal shepherd: when a player is illegally bumped by a player in a marking or ruck contest who makes no legitimate effort to contest the ball.
- Kicking in danger: kicking an opponent or near an opponent in a manner likely to cause injury, usually while attempting to kick the football off the ground.
- 6-6-6 infringement: a team not lining up with six players in each 50-metre arc (including one in each goal square), four in the centre square, and one on each wing at a centre bounce.
- Interchange infringement: when a player enters the arena without following interchange protocol.
- Runner interference: paid against a runner, trainer or other club official who impedes the play as part of his or her normal on-ground duties.
- Abuse/dissent: against a player who abuses or shows demonstrative dissent towards an umpire.

== Playing on ==
A player taking a free kick is allowed to take his kick or handpass unimpeded unless the umpire calls play on. Play on will be called if:

- the player runs off his line; i.e. off the direct line between the man on the mark and the centre of the goals.
- the player runs over his mark; i.e. if the man on the mark has not set himself and the player runs towards his goals. This often happens deliberately if the player is pressing an advantage (such as setting up a goal kick while the opposing players are not yet in position to defend).
- the player takes too long to take his kick or handpass. Typically, this is after ten seconds for any free kick around the ground, and thirty seconds for a set shot at goals inside the 50 metre line. Players are allowed to play on voluntarily in either scenario, even after taking the longer thirty seconds period.

The umpire has sole discretion over whether he believes the player has played on. Once a player plays on, he can be pursued by any opposition players. While the man on the mark can advance to hurry his disposal, he is most vulnerable to being tackled from a player pursuing from behind.

== Advantage ==
Players may ignore the whistle that indicates a free kick has been awarded and play on, if play is continuous. If stopping play is disadvantageous to the team receiving the free kick, then advantage is paid to that team, if that team elects to take the advantage. The umpire does not decide on advantage, unless play is not continuous. An example of this is when a player tackles his opponent, the ball spills free and is collected by a player on the tackler's team and the ball is moved downfield. In this case, stopping the game for the free kick would penalise the team that earns the free kick, hence advantage is paid. A player cannot change his mind once he has elected to take the advantage. Advantage cannot be paid from a mark.

== Spot ==
Free kicks are paid either at the spot of the foul or mark, or if the infringement is away from the ball then at the spot of the ball when the infringement occurs – whichever is closer to goal for the team receiving the free kick. The spot of the free kick can be shifted under the following circumstances:

- In the attacking goal square, the spot is moved to the centre line of the goal, to give the kicker a direct angle at the goal. This interpretation was introduced in 2006 – prior to this, if a close range free kick were spotted off-centre, very wide angle shots were common.
- Any free kick from behind the defensive nine-metre line is spotted on the nine-metre line.
- If a rules infringement occurs against a player after he has disposed of the football but before another player receives it (typically a late bump), the free kick is spotted where the ball lands, rather than where the ball is at the time of the infringement.

When a free kick is spotted away from the infringement, it is awarded to the nearest player to the spot rather than to the infringed player.

=== 50-metre penalty ===
If play has stopped for a free kick or mark, and a second infringement occurs before the free kick has been taken, then a 50-metre penalty is awarded, which moves the spot of the original free kick 50 metres closer to the goal-line. The second infringement is usually against the player who has the original free kick (e.g. for slowing play down by running across the mark, or by a late hit after a mark), but the same rule applies for any second infringement occurring anywhere on the field. In the latter circumstance, the greater penalty of a 50-metre penalty or a free kick at the spot of the second infringement is applied.

== The "protected area" ==
When a player takes a free kick, the laws of the game stipulate that a protected area exists around the person in possession. The protected area is the corridor ten metres to either side of the ball-carrier backwards from the mark, including an additional semicircle with a 20-metre width (10 metres to the left and right of behind the player with the ball) and 5 metres behind the ball carrier as well. Additionally, there is an extra five metres of the protected zone behind the player on the mark; a prominent example of this specific infringement can be seen here.

The laws of the game state that no player from either team is allowed within the protected area zone until the free kick is taken or play-on is called. If a player from the attacking team is within the zone, the umpire will blow time off until he leaves the zone; if a player from the defending team is within the zone, a 50-metre penalty is applied unless the player is following an opponent within two metres.

The protected zone has varied in size and shape over the history of the game, and was most recently adjusted in 2021 to prevent any lateral movement from the player on the mark.

== Staging ==
Players may attempt to deliberately draw contact to the head or fall forward from a push in an attempt to stage for a free kick, similar to diving or flopping in soccer and other codes. In the AFL, such infractions may be penalised with fines by the tribunal.
