= Deliberate out of bounds =

In Australian rules football, deliberate out of bounds, is the common name for a rule which results in a free kick against a team which puts the ball out of bounds with insufficient intent to keep the ball in bounds. It is also known as insufficient intent.

== Official rules ==
The rule is covered by Law 18.10(b) in the 2021 version of the Laws of Australian Football. The official wording of the law is:
18.10 A field Umpire shall award a Free Kick against a Player who:...

- (b) Kicks, Handballs or forces the football over the Boundary Line and does not demonstrate sufficient intent to keep the football in play

In practice, most free kicks under the rule come in one of two situations: either when a player puts the ball directly out of bounds to relieve a high pressure situation; or when a player gains territory from a longer disposal which goes out of bounds without any teammate having a reasonable chance of possessing it.

== Rule history ==
The deliberate out of bounds rule has a long history in Australian rules football, dating back to the 19th century. Prior to the 1883 season, a rule was introduced to award a free kick against a player who deliberately kicked the ball out of bounds from a kick-in after a behind. This was extended to putting the ball out of bounds from an in-play situation at the intercolonial conference prior to the 1886 season. At this time, the rule read almost identically to its present form, stating that a free kick shall be given when a player wilfully kicks or forces the ball out of bounds while in play. The rules were introduced largely to put an end to the disliked strategy of kicking the ball out of bounds as a means of timewasting.

The rule continued to exist in the Laws of the Game more or less unchanged for the next 130 years – with the exception of the period from 1925 until 1938, during which time the basic out-of-bounds rules provided for a free kick to always paid against the last player to touch the ball before it went out of bounds whether it was deliberate or not, making the specific provisions of the rule redundant. Although the rule has been largely unchanged, the strictness of its application has varied over time.

Until 2016, the specific wording of the law awarded a free kick against a player who "intentionally kicks, handballs or forces the football over the boundary line without the football being touched by another player". Following a specific directive to apply the rule more strictly was introduced for the 2016 AFL season in an attempt to reduce the number of boundary throw-ins, the law was formally changed to its current wording in 2017. This eliminated the word intentionally and replaced it with the phrase does not demonstrate sufficient intent – substantially lowering the minimum threshold for awarding a free kick.

The law's historical name "deliberate out of bounds" remains in wide use, despite no longer accurately describing the law – something which causes confusion and frustration among players and spectators. Crowds continue to roar "Deliberate!" when they believe a free kick should be paid under the rule.

An alternative rule which penalises a player whose kick or handball crosses the boundary line with a free kick to the opposition, known as a last possession out of bounds (or last touch) rule, has returned in leagues including the South Australian National Football League (since 2016) and AFL Women's (since 2018).
