= Kick-in =

Term in Australian rules football

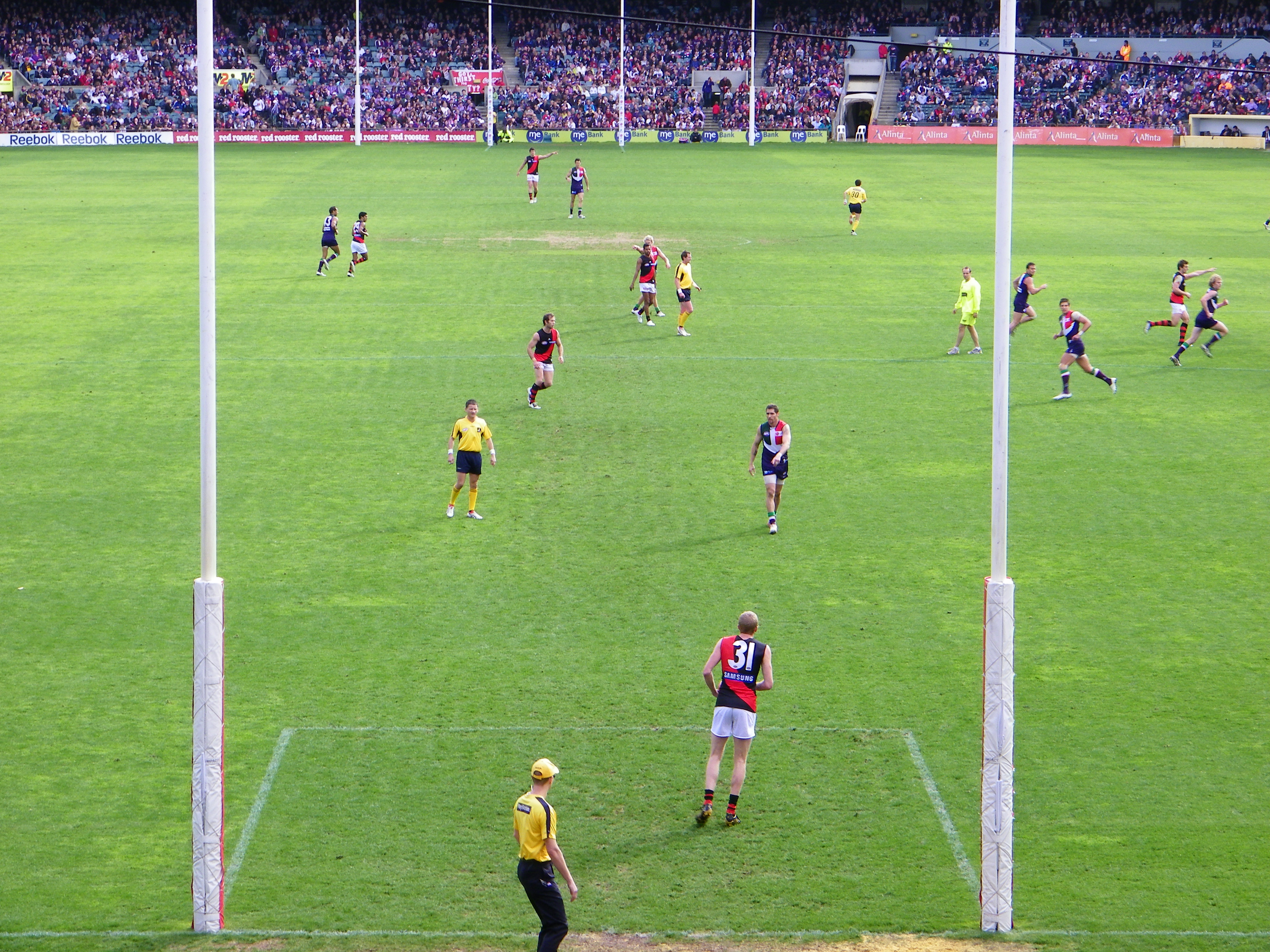
Essendon's Dustin Fletcher stands in the goal square, preparing to kick in during a match against Fremantle.

In the sport of Australian rules football, a kick-in (sometimes known as a kick-out, and known for much of the game's history as a kick-off) is the common name for the procedure to restart the game after a behind. It involves a defender from the team who did not score kicking the ball back into play from the defensive goal square.

== Rules ==
The process of the kick-in is described under Law 16 of the 2019 laws of Australian rules football, Procedure after a behind has been scored.

After the goal umpire has signalled a behind (but not necessarily after communicating it to the other goal umpire with the waving of one flag), any player from the team which did not score takes possession of the ball in the defensive goal square. No defending players are allowed within the protected zone, which extends fifteen metres beyond the top of the goal square (the kick-off line) and 6.4 m to either side, which is the width between the behind posts). The man on the mark stands no closer than ten metres from the kick-off line.

The player taking the kick-in may either kick from within the goal square; or, may exit the goal square, at which point the umpire will call play on. The umpire may also call play on if the player does not take a kick or play on within a reasonable time. Once play on has been called, the normal rules of general play apply, and opposing players are allowed within the protected zone to put pressure on the player kicking in. The player kicking in may not handpass from the goal square until play on has been called.

In accordance with Law 10.5.2, the time clock does not run until the player kicking in has brought the ball back into play – either by kicking or being called to play on.

== History ==
The kick-in (or kick-off, as it was originally known) has been part of the laws of the game since the very beginning, covered in Law 5 of the Melbourne Football Club's original May 1859 rules. Resembling the process for restarting play in many English school football codes, the original law stated:

5. In case the ball is kicked "behind" Goal, any one of the side behind whose Goal it is kicked may bring it 20 yards in front of any portion of the space between the "kick off" posts, and shall kick it as nearly as possible in line with the opposite Goal.

The rules governing kick-ins have changed several times through the game's history:

- It had become very common for the kick-in to be directed toward the boundary line as a means of timewasting. To prevent this, prior to the 1883 season, a provision was introduced to award a free kick against a player who, in the umpire's opinion, deliberately kicked the ball out of bounds from a kick-in.
- In the 1886 revision, the law was amended to read that a free kick would be awarded if the player kicked the ball "clear out of bounds when kicking off" – that is, any kick out of bounds on the full, irrespective of the player's intent. (Kicking out of bounds on the full from general play was not a free kick in its own right until 1969, so this provision was applied only to kick-ins).
- For a time, the VFL and VFA had different penalties for a kick-in which went out of bounds on the full: in the VFL, the free kick was awarded where the ball went out of play; in the VFA, it was awarded at the top of the goal square, resulting in a near-certain goal. Eventually, the VFL's interpretation prevailed.
- In 1907, the procedure for stepping over the kick-off line was altered. If the kicker stepped over the lines marking out the goal square, the umpire would execute a ball-up on the centre of the kick-off line. Prior to this, the full-back was given a second chance to kick legally; and a free kick would be awarded to the opponent on the kick-off line if a second infringement occurred. This rule remained in place until 2018.
- From 1925 until 1938, the overarching rules governing out-of-bounds were amended, and a free kick was always against the last player to touch the ball in any circumstances. As such, there was no longer a need for any specific provisions in the laws for a kick-in which went out of bounds.
- In 1939, after the boundary throw-in was reintroduced, a free kick was retained for any kick-in which went out of bounds without having been touched by another player – whether it went out on the full or on the bounce. This rule remained in place until 2018, and was the last remnant of the 'last touch out of bounds' rules from the 1925–1938 period.
- In 1940, it was established that the player could not kick in until the goal umpires had finished waving flags to communicate the behind.
- In 1988, the laws were amended to require that the player kick the ball a distance of at least two metres when kicking in, and would not be allowed to play on by handpass. This was part of a broader rules which forbade playing on by handpass from any free kick in general play; the rules related to general play were rescinded in 1990, but the provision related to kick-ins remained until 1994.
- In 1995, the provision for the player to play on from the kick-in was re-introduced. To do this, the player had to kick the ball to himself at the edge of the goal square. After playing on, any subsequent kick was not considered a kick-in, so was not subject to free kick if it went out of bounds untouched.
- In 2006, the requirement to wait for the goal umpires to finish waving the flags was removed, and the kick-in could occur once the goal umpire had signalled the behind.
- 2019 saw substantial changes to the kick-in rule, amending it almost to its current form. The man on the mark was moved to be ten metres in front of the kick-off line instead of five; and the player was given the option to play on by exiting the goal square without needing to kick to himself. There is no longer any specific provision in the laws related to a kick-in which goes out of bounds (although the general laws related to kicking the ball out of bounds on the full and deliberate out of bounds still apply), and there is no longer the possibility for the umpire to bounce the ball on the kick-off line for the player overstepping the goal square. A small blue dot was painted onto AFL grounds in the location of the mark.
- In 2021, the player on the mark was moved again to be fifteen metres in front of the kick-off line instead of ten.

== Tactics ==
Until the 1970s, conventional wisdom was to have one of the team's longest kickers kick the ball into play as far as possible so that, in the event of a turnover, the opposition would need at least two kicks to score a goal. Drop kicks, even after they otherwise had disappeared from field play, were often used for kick-ins well into the 1970s, as they were longer than any other type of kick except for the hard-to-control torpedo punt.

The 1970s saw players defending the kick-in frequently punch the long kick back towards their crumbing forwards who would be close enough to score; and this began to change tactics, as teams began to favour making a safe, accurate short pass to a team-mate from the kick-in, followed by a long kick to put extra distance between the ball and the goal. The huddle became a well-known tactic: several players would gather 40–50 m from goal, then break on leads in all directions – making it difficult for the defending team to cover all players and usually giving the full back at least one safe kick-in option.

Through the 2000s, the development of defensive zone tactics designed to prevent opponents from freely rebounding the football made kick-ins increasingly difficult to execute well. Several rule changes made during the 2000s were designed to speed up kick-ins, giving teams less time to set up tight defense and giving the kicking player more space.

== Terminology ==
Although the most common names are kick-in and kick-out, these terms are not used in the laws of the game. Since 2019, the procedure has officially been known as bringing the football back into play; and, up to 2018, as kicking the football back into play.

The procedure was originally called a kick-off, but this term is now disused; a remnant of it still exists in the laws, in that the top of the goal square (9 m from the goal line) is still called the kick-off line.

Other common terms associated with the kick-in are:

- Seven point play – when a team kicks a behind, then quickly turns over the kick-in and kicks a goal.
- Coast to coast goal – when a team kicks a goal from a passage of play which started with a kick-in, and without the opposition touching it.
