= Set shot =

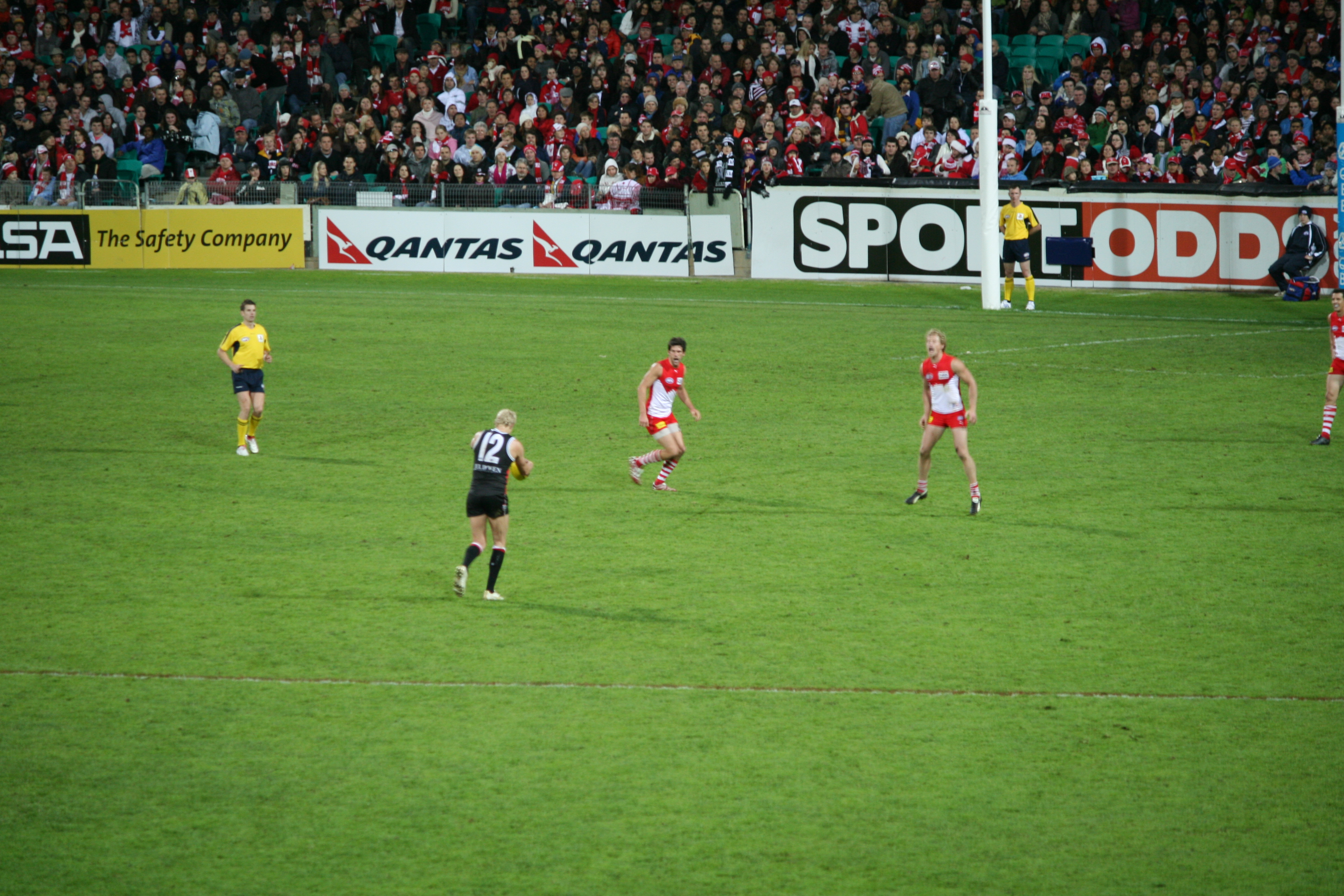
Nick Riewoldt taking a set shot against the Sydney Swans

A set shot in Australian rules football is a kick for goal in which the player can "set" themselves, rather than have to quickly react during the play. A set shot occurs when a player has been awarded a free kick, or has taken a mark within kicking range of the goal (typically inside the fifty-metre line in front of the goal). There is always one opponent allowed to be "on the mark" (the place where the mark was taken), who can attempt to distract the kicker by gesticulation or verbal intimidation. The game clock continues to run during the preparation for a set shot, although time on may temporarily be blown to return the football to the kicker.

Players are given up to thirty seconds to begin their approach for a set shot (the kick itself may be taken outside the thirty seconds if the approach is commenced); umpires will call play on if the player does not begin his approach within this time. This rule was introduced in 2006; prior to 2006, players had no formal limit on how long they could take (the umpire could at his discretion penalise the player for time-wasting, but this was rare), and the new rule was commonly known as the "Lloyd rule" after Essendon full-forward Matthew Lloyd, whose set shot ritual was one of the longest in the AFL. From 2016 in the Australian Football League, thirty seconds has been counted down on a shot clock that is visible on some ground scoreboards (although always known to the umpires). A player may take as long as they want (within reason) to take a shot after the siren, as the point of a shot clock is to speed up the flow of the game as well as prevent time-wasting.
