= Torpedo punt =

Kick in Australian rules football

The torpedo punt (also known as screw punt, spiral punt, barrel, torp or bomb) is a type of punt kick implemented in Australian rules football, rugby union and rugby league, and more generally with an ellipsoidal football. The torpedo punt is the longest type of punt kick. It is also the predominant form of punt used in gridiron football codes.

In flight, the ball spins about its long axis, instead of end over end (as the drop punt does) or not at all (as a typical punt kick does), making the flight of the ball more aerodynamic, but more difficult to catch (or mark in some football codes). The pointier ends make the ball easier to catch in American Football. With extra distance, this type of kick is also more difficult to accurately judge depth. If kicked correctly, an Australian football can travel over 80 metres when torpedoed.

In Australian rules football, the kick has become less common since the 1980s, as modern tactics have meant that accuracy has become typically more important than distance in field kicking; as such, coaches now prefer the use of the drop punt, and they typically discourage the use of the torpedo in general field play as a comparatively low-percentage kick. The kick may still be seen when a player needs additional distance such as when a player has a set shot after the siren and is out of their normal range. Essendon's Dustin Fletcher was especially regarded for his use of the torpedo as both a defensive and offensive weapon.

In the Rugby codes the kick is rarely used. It is sometimes used in the back line as a clearing kick.

Australian rules footballer Gordon Rattray, who played his football with the Fitzroy Football Club between 1917 and 1928, is credited as the first player to use the torpedo punt in that code. Alex Moffat is credited with creating the torpedo punt in the United States.

== See also ==
- Drop Punt
- Checkside punt
- Snap kick
- Drop kick
- Punt Kick (American football)
- Bomb Kick
- Grubber kick
