= Ben Graham (footballer) =

Australian rules footballer and American football player (born 1973)

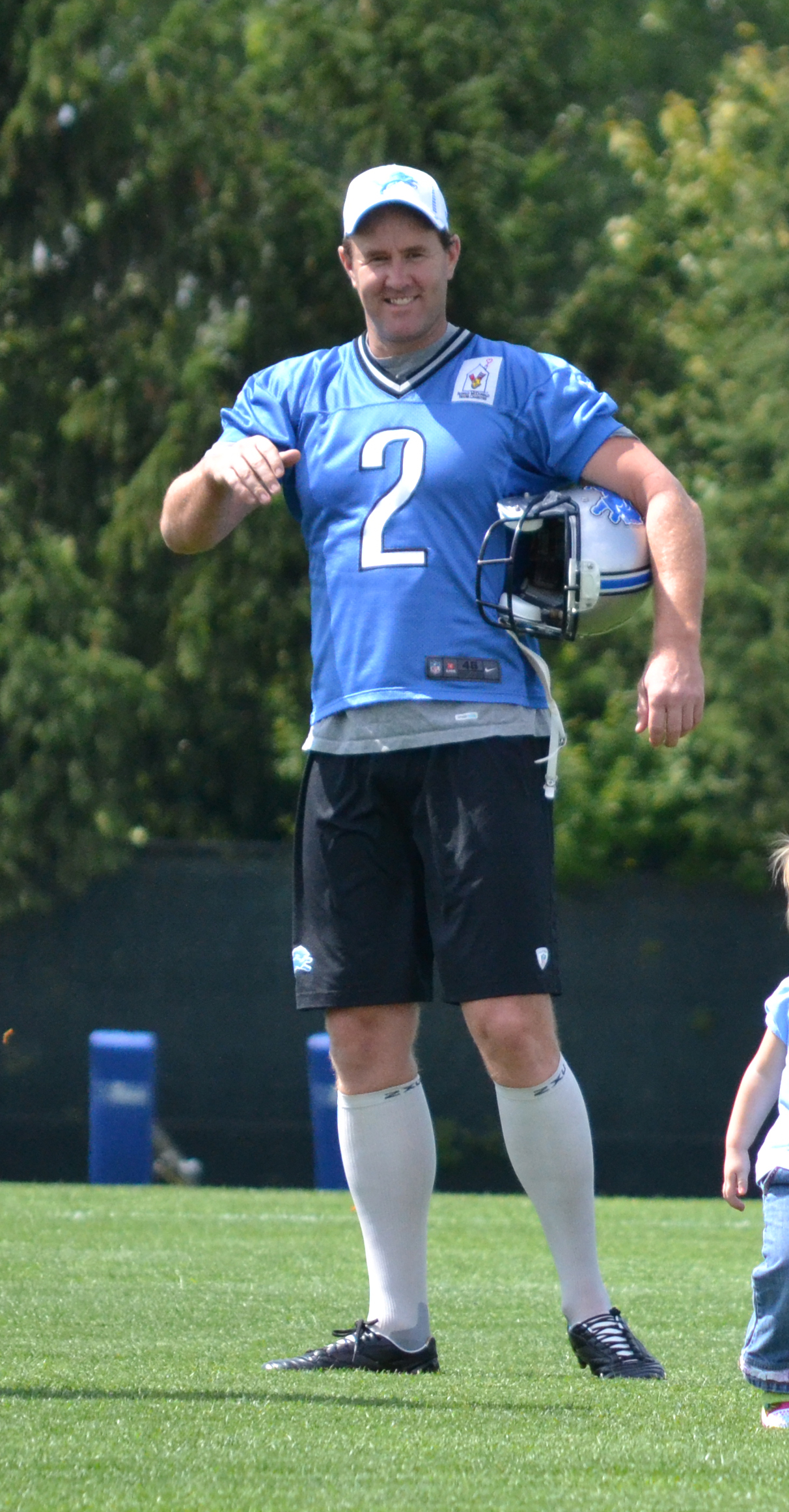
- Graham during the 2012 Detroit Lions training camp

Personal information
- Full name: Benjamin James Graham
- Born: 2 November 1973 (age 53) Geelong, Victoria, Australia
- Height: 6 ft 5 in (196 cm)
- Weight: 235 lb (107 kg; 16 st 11 lb)
Australian rules football career
Personal information
- Original team: Leopold / Geelong U19
- Draft: 40th overall, 1992 pre-season Geelong
- Debut: Round 21, 21 August 1993, Geelong vs. Essendon, at Kardinia Park
- Position: Centre half-forward / Centre half-back
Playing career
Years	Club	Games (Goals)
1993–2004	Geelong	219 (145)

Sport
- Football career

No. 7, 5, 2
- Position: Punter

Career history
- New York Jets (2005–2008); New Orleans Saints (2008); Arizona Cardinals (2008–2011); Detroit Lions (2011–2012)

Awards and highlights
- 42 punts inside the 20 in the 2009 NFL season, tying Andy Lee's NFL record; NFL record of oldest rookie (2005–2006)

Career statistics
- Punts: 467
- Punting yards: 20,623
- Punting average: 44.2
- Stats at Pro Football Reference

Benjamin James Graham (born 2 November 1973) is a former professional Australian rules footballer turned professional American football punter of the National Football League (NFL).

Graham's 219 game Australian rules career was played exclusively at the Geelong Football Club in the Australian Football League (AFL) between 1993 and 2004. As an Aussie rules player, Graham was long noted for his ability to kick extraordinarily long distances with accuracy (in particular his expertise at the torpedo punt). This is one of the key reasons that he was believed to have potential as a professional NFL punter. The left-footer played for the New York Jets, New Orleans Saints, and Arizona Cardinals of the NFL.

He is the only player to be named a captain of both an AFL and NFL side. During his career, he played in the biggest game of both codes, the AFL Grand Final (1995 AFL Grand Final) and the Super Bowl (Super Bowl XLIII). He was the first Australian to play in a Super Bowl.

== Early life ==
Graham was born in Geelong to mother, Helen, and father, Tony. He grew up in Leopold, Victoria, and began playing Aussie rules at a young age for the local Leopold Football Club in the Bellarine Football League, where his father was a former premiership player and coach. Graham's football ability was obvious from an early age, and he was selected by the Geelong U19s (now Geelong Falcons), where he was first identified by AFL talent scouts.

== Australian rules football career ==
Graham was recruited by Geelong at pick 40 in the 1992 Australian Football League (AFL) pre-season draft. He was Geelong's "Best First-Year Player" in the reserves team of 1992, and made his debut with the Geelong seniors late in 1993.

Graham was noted for his long kicking (in particular his expertise at the torpedo punt), and could play at both ends of the ground as a key-position player. He played at centre half-forward and could convert goals from distances of 60 metres, as well as playing at centre half-back, where his booming kicks cleared the ball from defence, particularly during kickouts. Against Port Adelaide in Round 19, 1999, when Graham was bringing the ball back in from play, he booted the ball just over 85 metres, which was past the centre circle of Simonds Stadium.

Graham played in Geelong's 1995 AFL Grand Final loss to Carlton. For the year, he was named most improved player at Geelong.

Graham won the club's best and fairest award (the Carji Greeves Medal) in 1999.

He followed his 1999 season with another solid season in 2000, finishing runner-up in the best & fairest in a year in which he was also bestowed the honour of the club captaincy.

In 2001, he was inducted into the Geelong Football Club Hall of Fame and granted life membership.

Graham retained the club captaincy until the end of 2002.

== Statistics ==
Legend
G	Goals	K	Kicks	D	Disposals	T	Tackles
B	Behinds	H	Handballs	M	Marks

Season	Team	No.	Games	Totals							Averages (per game)						
Season	Team	No.	Games	G	B	K	H	D	M	T	G	B	K	H	D	M	T
1993	Geelong	36	1	0	0	7	5	12	1	4	0.00	0.00	7.00	5.00	12.00	1.00	4.00
1994	Geelong	36	7	3	3	17	14	31	10	2	0.43	0.43	2.43	2.00	4.43	1.43	0.29
1995	Geelong	36	24	0	0	163	82	245	63	27	0.00	0.00	6.79	3.42	10.21	2.63	1.13
1996	Geelong	36	17	2	4	112	60	172	50	12	0.12	0.24	6.59	3.53	10.12	2.94	0.71
1997	Geelong	36	24	1	0	226	81	307	85	24	0.04	0.00	9.42	3.38	12.79	3.54	1.00
1998	Geelong	7	12	0	1	91	38	129	37	19	0.00	0.08	7.58	3.17	10.75	3.08	1.58
1999	Geelong	7	22	18	11	223	79	302	101	29	0.82	0.50	10.14	3.59	13.73	4.59	1.32
2000	Geelong	7	23	14	7	279	104	383	148	40	0.61	0.30	12.13	4.52	16.65	6.43	1.74
2001	Geelong	7	22	33	16	216	97	313	152	44	1.50	0.73	9.82	4.41	14.23	6.91	2.00
2002	Geelong	7	22	15	16	173	89	262	97	38	0.68	0.73	7.86	4.05	11.91	4.41	1.73
2003	Geelong	7	22	20	24	181	85	266	110	42	0.91	1.09	8.23	3.86	12.09	5.00	1.91
2004	Geelong	7	23	39	31	202	69	271	131	40	1.70	1.35	8.78	3.00	11.78	5.70	1.74
Career			219	145	113	1890	803	2693	985	321	0.66	0.52	8.63	3.67	12.30	4.50	1.47

== Honours and achievements ==
Individual

- Geelong captain: 2000–2002
- Carji Greeves Medal: 1999
- Australian team representative honours in the 1999 International Rules Series

== American football career ==
Graham was first approached by the New York Jets to try out as a punter in 1997; however, he decided to stay in the AFL.

In 2004, he surprised many in Australia when he quit Australian rules football and left for the United States to pursue a career as a punter in the National Football League, where he would ultimately be paid many times more than he would have earned in Australia and extended his playing career by many years.

=== New York Jets ===
Graham was signed to a short-term contract by the New York Jets in January 2005. He moved to New York City and attended Jets training camp at Hofstra University, before being confirmed as the team's starting punter for the 2005 NFL season when his predecessor Micah Knorr was released. When Graham played his first NFL regular season game (against the Kansas City Chiefs at Arrowhead Stadium on 11 September 2005), he became the second person after Darren Bennett to play in both the AFL and the NFL (Colin Ridgeway played at AFL reserves level for Carlton), and fourth Australian NFL player. He also became the oldest rookie ever to be part of an NFL opening day roster at age 31.

On 22 May 2006, the Jets signed Graham to a six-year contract worth US$5.17 million.

In late 2006, Graham made history becoming the first Australian to captain an American pro sports team when he joined the leadership group of the New York Jets. He also became the only player to captain a team in two different professional sports leagues. Graham also used the Australian drop punt—a style of kicking prevalent in Australian rules football first introduced in 1997 to the NFL by fellow Australian Darren Bennett—which improves kicking efficiency and is said to be an innovation to the game of American football.

The Jets waived Graham on 16 September 2008, but he did not miss a game: they quickly re-signed him on 22 September due to a minor injury to his replacement Reggie Hodges. Graham was released again on 29 September after Hodges recovered.

=== New Orleans Saints ===
On 20 October 2008, Graham signed with the New Orleans Saints to play a game in London. The team had released incumbent punter Steve Weatherford earlier in the week due to travel arrangement issues. He played just the one game, punting three times with an average of 42 yards, before being released on 29 October. He was replaced by Glenn Pakulak.

=== Arizona Cardinals ===
Graham was signed by the Arizona Cardinals on 1 December 2008 after the team released punter Dirk Johnson; this was the second time that Johnson had been replaced by an Australian punter. In the NFC Championship game that year, Graham's Cardinals played the Philadelphia Eagles, whose punter, Sav Rocca, also was an ex-AFL player from Collingwood and North Melbourne. This guaranteed that one of the two would be the first Australian to play in a Super Bowl. The Cardinals' victory presented that honour to Graham. The Cardinals released Graham on 2 September 2011, before the start of the season. But they re-signed him on 5 October; he was released again on 11 October, after one game covering for the injured Dave Zastudil.

=== Detroit Lions ===
On 15 November 2011, Graham signed with the Detroit Lions, replacing Robert Malone. Malone had played only one game after replacing the injured Ryan Donahue. During the 2012 preseason, Graham beat out Donahue for the starting job. On 25 September 2012, Graham was placed on the season-ending injured reserve list. Nick Harris was signed to replace Graham for the remainder of the season. He was released with an injury settlement later that season.

=== International career ===
In 2011 with the NFL lockout looming, Graham announced his intention to play for the Australian National team in the 2011 IFAF World Cup, the official international American Football championship tournament. Later, he officially was added to the roster as the country's starting punter.

== Post-playing career ==
In 2012, Graham joined the Western Bulldogs as a strategic football operations manager.

== Personal life ==
Graham and his wife, Katie, have two daughters, Sophie and Rosie, and one son, Jack. While playing for the Cats, Graham attended Deakin University in Geelong.

Graham's father and his younger brother, Sam, attended Super Bowl XLIII in Tampa, Florida, to watch him when he played for the Arizona Cardinals. Graham's mother, Helen, died from cancer on 21 April 2009.
