= Handball (Australian rules football) =

Term in the sport of Australian rules football

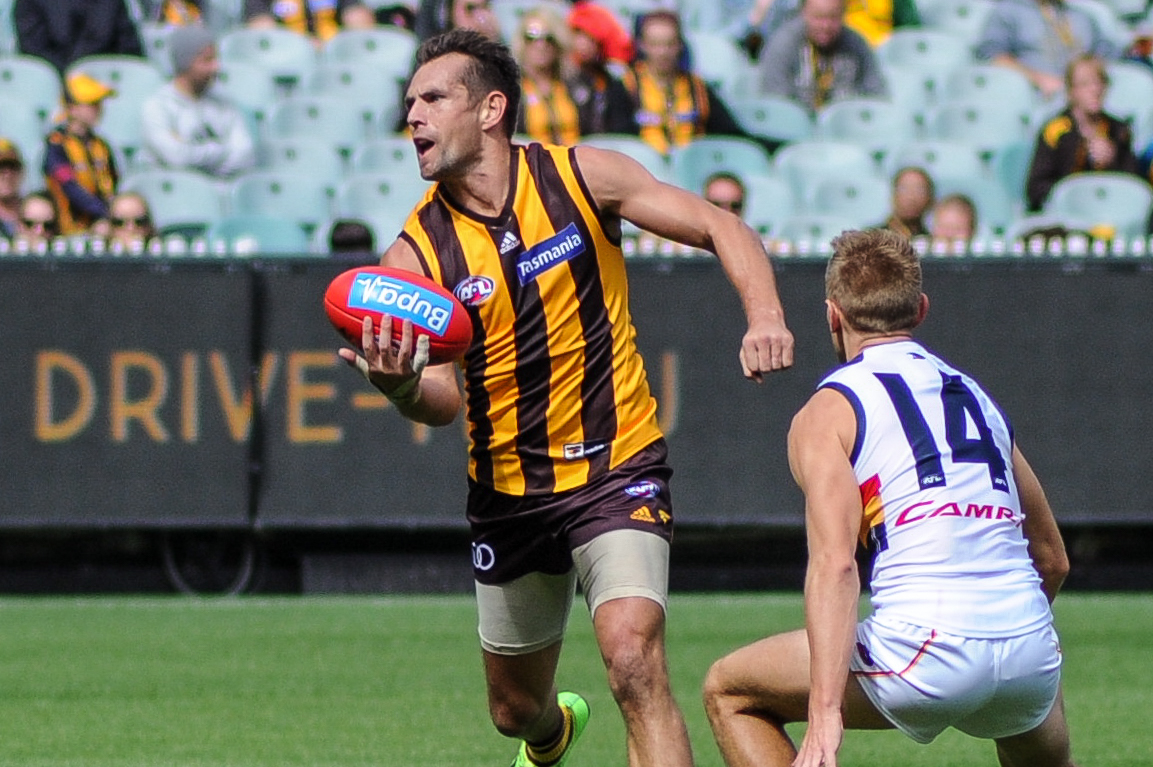
Luke Hodge preparing to execute a handball with his left hand. In a properly executed handball, the player holds the ball with one hand and punches the ball away with the clenched fist of the other.

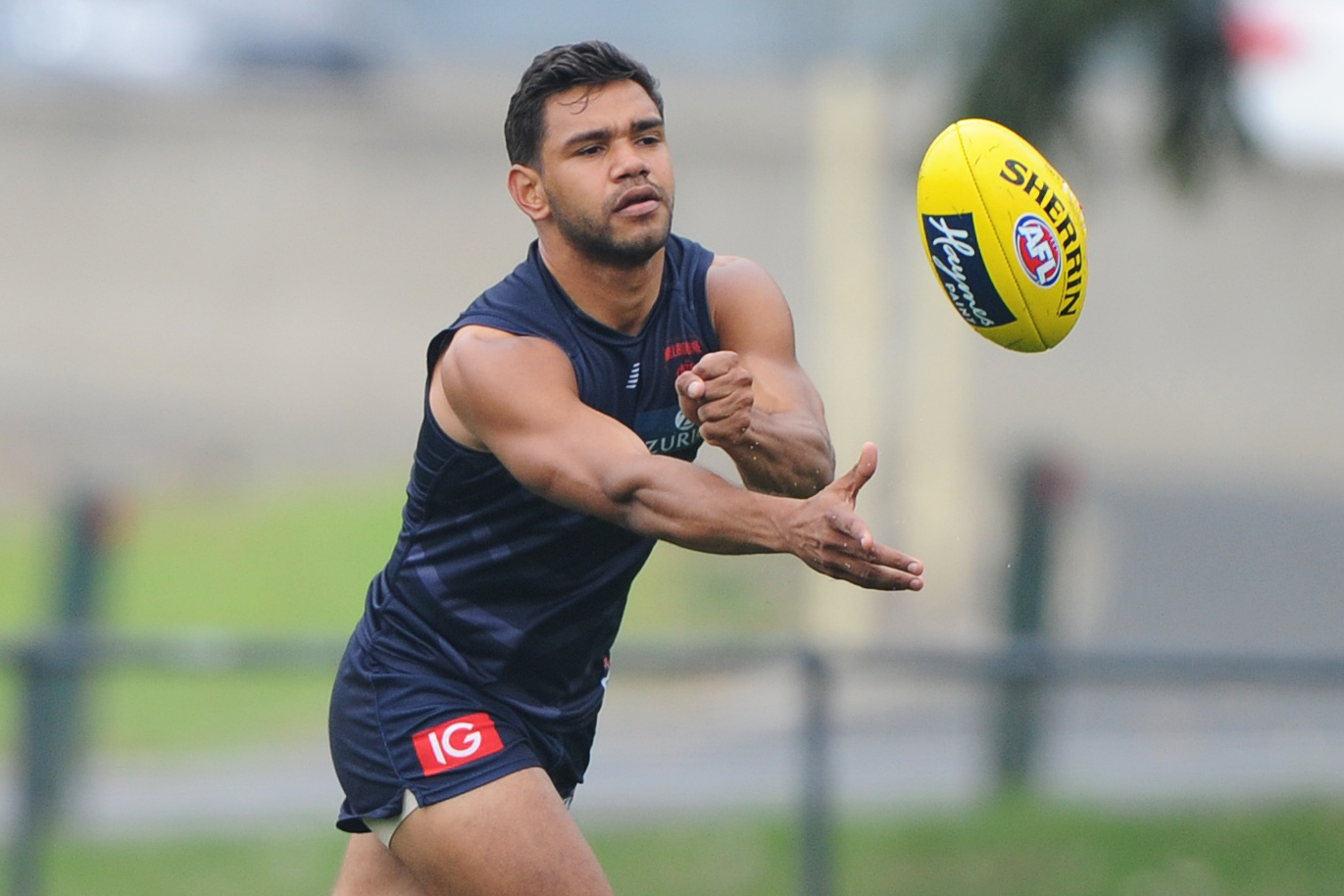
Neville Jetta handballing with his left. Australian rules players use opposite fists to pass to the left or right.

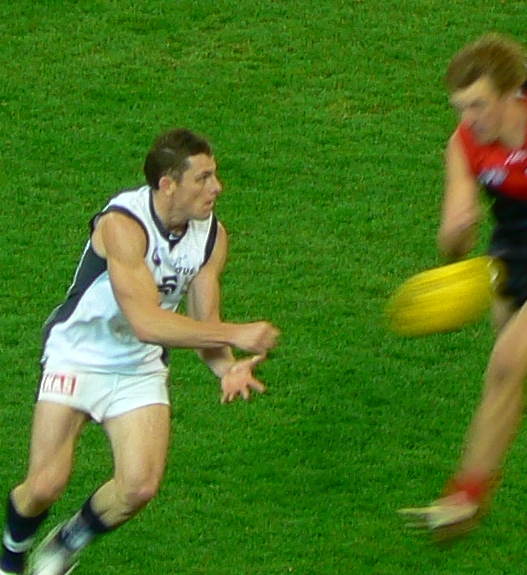
Heath Scotland executes a right hand rocket handpass to a teammate while under pressure.

The handball or handpass is a ball-passing skill in the sport of Australian rules football. As throwing the ball is not allowed in Australian football, passing to a fellow player are executed either by kicking, or by a controlled "punch" with one hand holding the ball while the other knocks it into flight (typically in a fashion similar to an uppercut or an underhand volleyball serve). Handballing is the primary means of disposing the ball quickly and over short distances in Australian football.

Handball revolutionized the game in the 1980s, moving it from the classic kick-and-mark style of play (which runs the risk of the pass being contested and intercepted by opposing players) to a fast run-and-carry style that emphasizes maintaining possession and rapid ball movements down the field, which has typified the game since. The most prolific handballers in the history of the Australian Football League: Lachie Neale, Greg Williams, Scott Pendlebury, Josh Kennedy and Adam Treloar have averaged more than 13 handballs a game.

== Skill ==
Handball is the most frequently used alternative to kicking for moving the football among players. In order to be a legal method to dispose of the ball, the player holds the ball with one hand and punches the ball away with the clenched fist of the other hand. A player typically punches with his dominant hand, thus holding the ball with the left hand and punching with the right hand is considered a right-handed handball.

When a player receives a handpass from another player, play continues. This is unlike the kick, where if a player catches the ball on the full from a kick (a mark), he is entitled to take his next kick unimpeded. Failure to execute a handball correctly is deemed a throw or illegal disposal and results in a free kick to the nearest opposition player. Moving the hand that holds the ball excessively in the direction of the handpass, using an open hand instead of a clenched fist to tap the ball away, punching the ball out of mid-air after having thrown or otherwise lost it from the carrying hand, or handing the ball directly to a teammate will all attract a free kick for illegal disposal.

== History ==
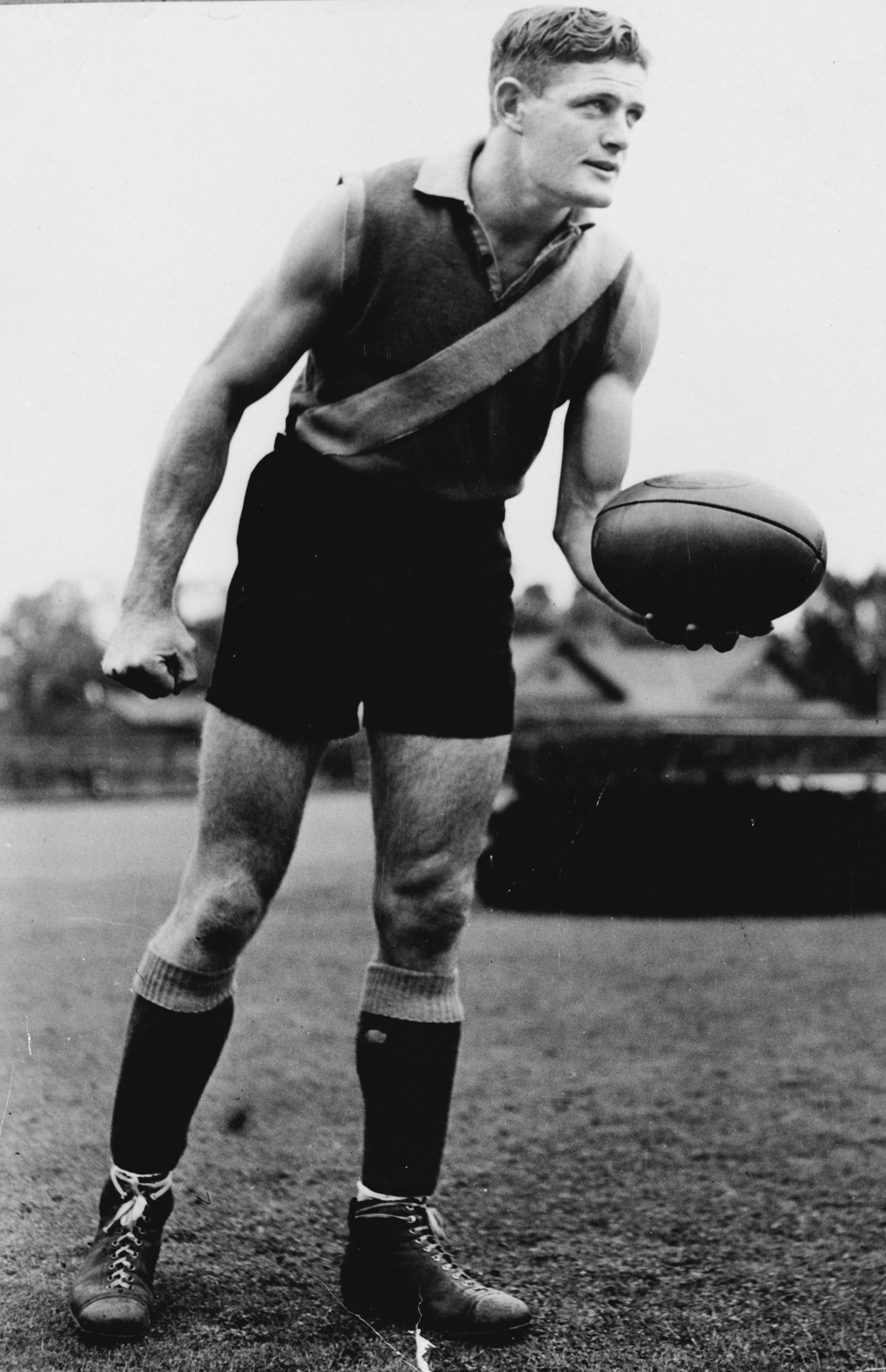
West Torrens Football Club captain Robert Hank demonstrates handballing technique with his right in 1950

The rule defines it similarly to the open hand tap/handpass in Gaelic football but differentiates the hand skills from other codes of football. Unlike Gaelic football, punching the oval ball was more frequently used as it was the most effective technique to move the heavier ball larger distances.

One of the sport's founding rules in 1859 was “the ball, while in play, may under no circumstances be thrown” i.e. in the manner of rugby football. Player ingenuity led to punching the ball (handpass) to a teammate.

Although the rules allowed for the handball, for most Australian football leagues the handball was largely a secondary skill to the kick and used as a last resort when a player had no time to kick. Strategically, Australian football was viewed as a territorial sport, where the prime aim was not so much possession, but to cover as much distance through the air as possible. As the holding hand could not move, this was best achieved by means of kicking the ball as far as possible.

The principally used handpass was top-spin in nature. This was used with the belief that the ball could be contained more locally and executed more quickly off the hands when the ball was held in preparation for kicking, as smaller handpasses were originally used mainly when in trouble. The other thought was that, as in tennis, a top-spun ball was more easily directed, dipped faster and possessed more stability in the air.

One notable variant of the handpass which began to develop was known as the flick pass, in which a player used his open hand instead of his fist to propel the ball. The legality of the flick pass has varied throughout the history of the game: it began to gain prominence in the early 1920s, before the Australian National Football Council (ANFC) voted to abolish it before the 1925 season, making the handpass with a clenched fist (sometimes termed a punch pass to distinguish it from the flick pass) the only legal form of handpass. This was not widely popular, as the style of punch pass used at the time a much more cumbersome disposal than a flick pass, and it resulted in the game being played at a slower pace. The flick pass was re-instated before the 1934 season. In the late 1950s and early 1960s, it re-emerged as a common technique to achieve centre square clearances from scrimmages, particularly at VFL club Fitzroy. Of the 88 handballs executed during the 1961 VFL Grand Final, 18 were flick passes. The flick pass was abolished permanently in 1966.

The flick pass had the significant drawback that its action was close to that of a throw, and different umpires had different interpretations of what was legal. In 1938, motivated by a desire to eliminate this inconsistency, and to speed up the game further, the Victorian Football Association (VFA) legalised throwing the ball, provided the throw was with two hands and both hands were below shoulder-height. The throw-pass was legal in the VFA and in some other competitions affiliated with it from 1938 until 1949, but it was never legal under ANFC rules.

The emergence of the handball as a more widely used skill for attacking took place in the 1960s and 1970s. Legendary coach Ron Barassi, Jr. credits Len Smith (coach at Fitzroy between 1958 and 1962) as being the first coach to encourage attacking use of handball in Victoria. A running handball game emerged in the South Australian National Football League (SANFL) with Sturt coach Jack Oatey credited with encouraging the skill through the late 1960s, leading to Sturt winning five premierships from 1966 to 1970. In Western Australia, Graham 'Polly' Farmer and Barry Cable brought a new dimension to the game using handball, with Farmer often looking for a runner to handpass to after each mark, to speed up the ball movement. The 1970 VFL Grand Final became particularly notable for its use of handball, as Carlton's extensive attacking use of handball at coach Barassi's direct and famous half time instructions helped it recover from a 44-point half-time deficit to win the game; the game is sometimes apocryphally referred to as the "birth of modern football" in recognition of the significant effect that a modern handballing game had on its result, although the style of play was already common before the game.

The modern handpass technique, known as the rocket handball, was pioneered by Kevin Sheedy. It is executed so that the ball rotates backwards in an end-to-end fashion, similar to the drop punt. The ball is held on a slight angle with the fist ending up in or close to the other open hand. This enables a handpass to achieve distance and speed comparable to a short kick and is easier for teammates to catch. Professional Australian footballers are typically competent at handballing using either punching arm. Other handball variations include the underground handball, which is similar to a bounce pass in basketball or netball, and the dubious hospital handball (so called because of its potential for putting the intended recipient in hospital due to opponents closing in on the target player, usually caused by a high pass to a closely guarded player).

With the wide adoption of the handball in the 1980s, midfielders such as Greg Williams and Dale Weightman became handball specialists, renowned their playmaking ability by preferring to handball in the midfield. In the 1980s, Richmond Football Club wingman Kevin Bartlett became famous for a style of play which involved use of the handball to dispose of the ball before an opponent was about to tackle.

Although rules were uniform across the country, local interpretations and customs varied. South Australian players became known for a very localised style of play in which players excelled in quickly releasing the ball. The style, known pejoratively interstate as a crow throw (derived from croweaters, a popular term for South Australians), became damaging to opposition sides in interstate matches, as well as a potent weapon for the Adelaide Crows when the club first entered the Australian Football League in the 1991 AFL season. The legality of the technique was frequently brought into question in the AFL. The South Australian style featured a significantly shorter swinging distance between the punching hand and holding hand, allowing it to be executed in almost any stance. This also made it more difficult for a tackler to attack the swinging arm. As had been a problem with the flick pass, it was more difficult for spectators and umpires to interpret whether or not the correct punching method is being used. Andrew Jarman was the most notable exponent, although it resulted in many free kicks against him when playing outside the SANFL.

Since 2000, the number of handpasses used in AFL matches has grown substantially, double that of the 1970s. The focus of the modern game was to use chains of handballs to break through defensive zones, and to avoid kicking to contests.

== Handball competitions ==
Handball competitions are often used to test the accuracy of handpasses. A handball competition typically uses a board or vertically hung material with a target consisting of multiple coloured concentric bands worth different points. The centre is usually cut out to let the ball through and is worth maximum points (typically ten).

Handball competitions often occur at local clubs, Auskick clinics and on television, most notably on the shows World of Sport and The Sunday Footy Show (both hosted by Lou Richards). Such competitions take place between Australian Football League players known for their handpassing skills, and often utilise moving targets.
