= Grubber kick =

Type of football play

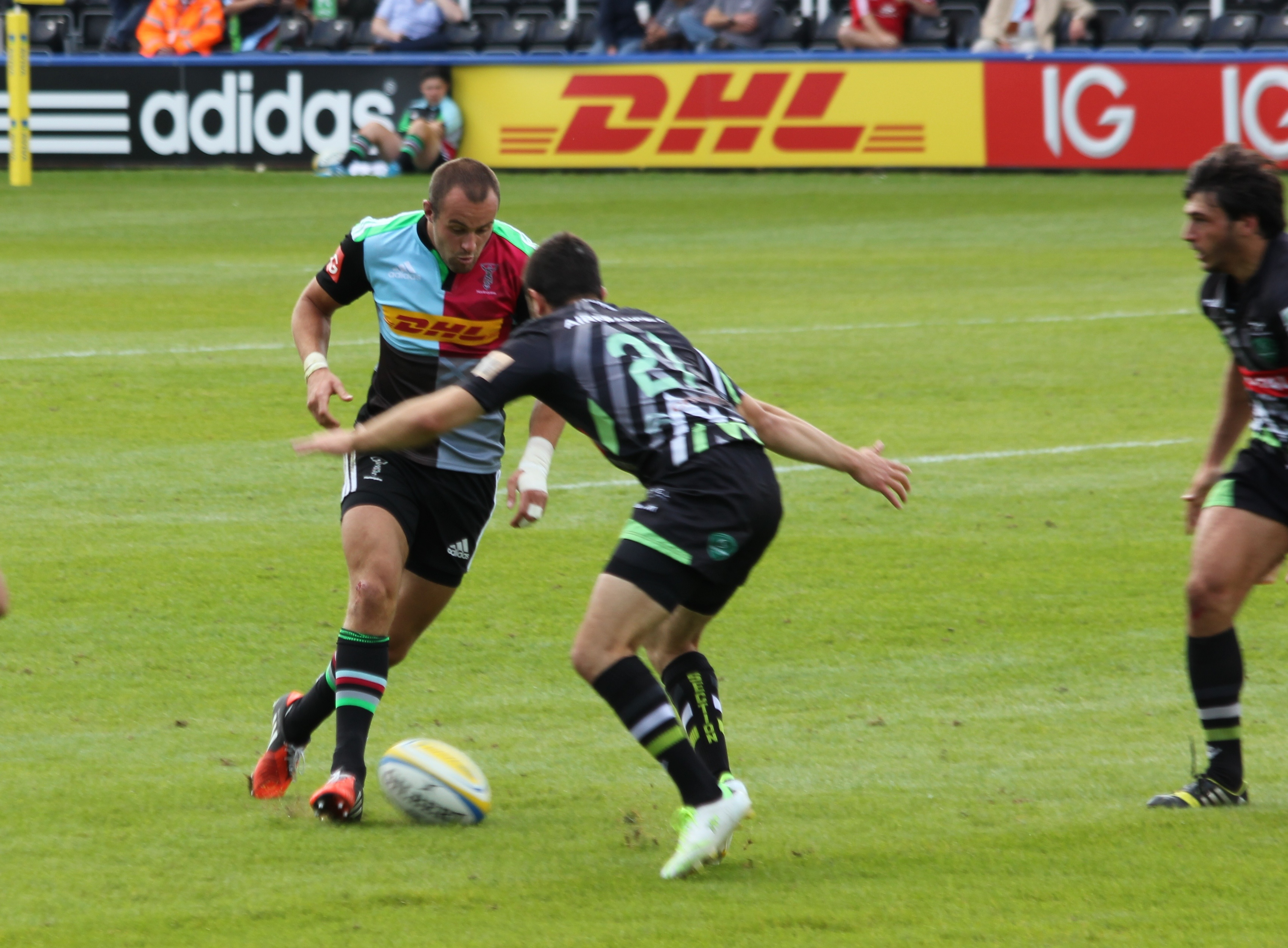
A grubber kick in Rugby Union

The grubber kick is a type of kick in various codes of football with an oval ball which results in the ball moving erratically along the ground.

The point of the grubber is to make the ball roll and tumble across the ground, making it hard for the defending team to pick up the ball without causing a knock-on. Its properties make it hard to handle, giving it both high and low bouncing. On random occasions, the ball can uncannily sit up in a perfect catching position.

== Rugby football ==
It is commonly practised in games derived from rugby football: rugby league and rugby union. In league, the grubber is usually executed when close to the opposition's line as an attacking play - grubbering into the ingoal. It can produce irregular bounces making it difficult for the opposing team to secure possession.

== Australian rules football ==
The kick is rare in Australian rules football, usually seen only in rushed, close proximity shots for goal. In recent times, rules players have practised techniques which use the unpredictable bounce of the ball to curve it towards goal, making it possible to kick goals from seemingly impossible angles (see also Checkside punt).

A fast kick close to or along the ground in Australian rules football is sometimes also referred to as a worm burner. These kicks are often used to prevent an opposition player from marking the ball.

== Execution ==
To execute a grubber, the ball is held on each side in an upright position slightly tilted toward the body. The kicker leans toward the ball, with their head and eyes over the ball. The release and the contact with the ball is the most important aspect and the most defining feature of the execution from other kicks. Contact is made with a slight bend in the knee on the upper half of the ball, before it makes contact with the ground. The follow through is with a straight leg and results in the ball moving along the ground.

== See also ==
- Punt kick
- Drop kick
- Bomb kick
- Squib kick
