= Kick (football) =

Skill used in many types of football

Drop punt Australian rules football

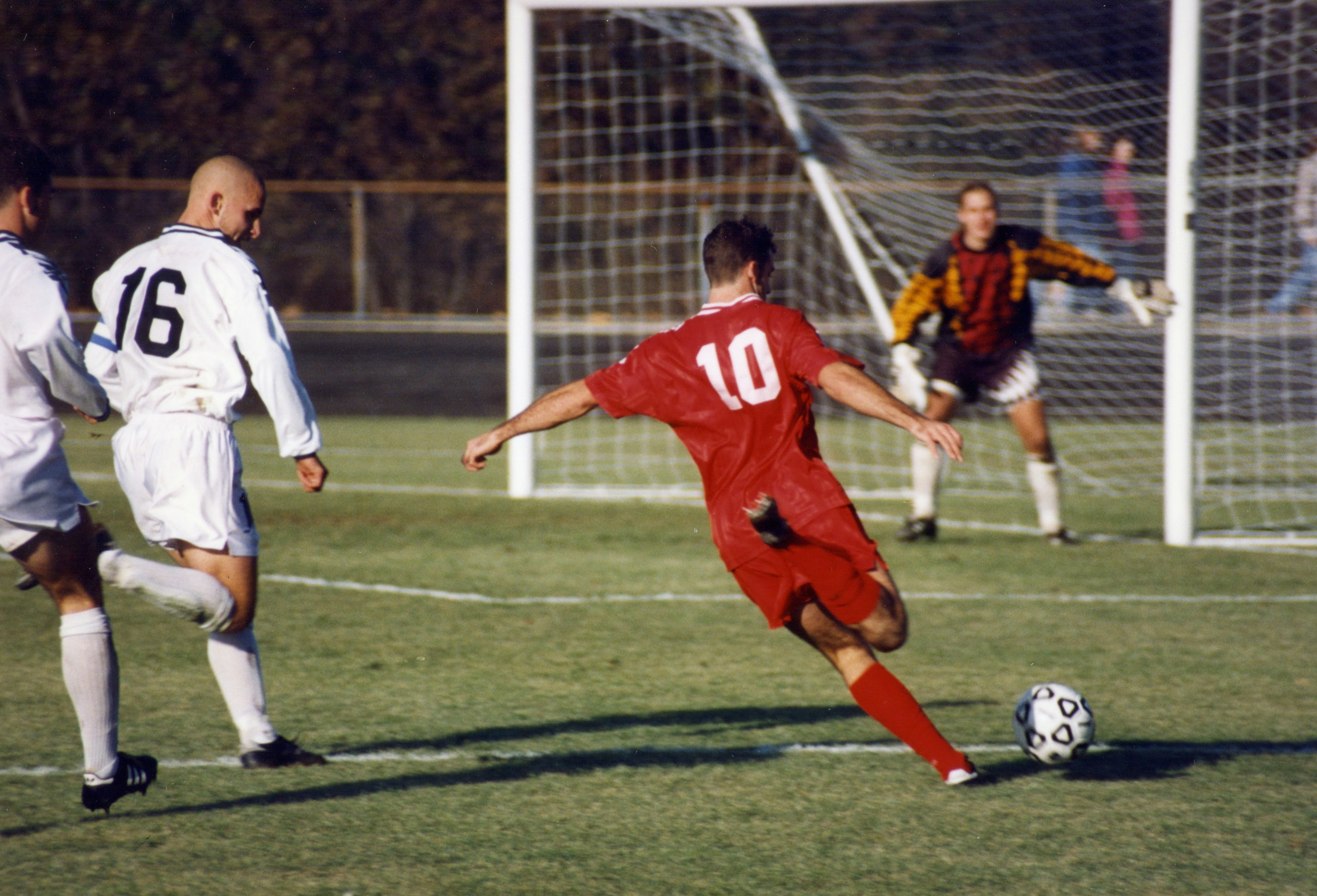
An association football striker taking a shot at the goal.

Kicking is a skill used in many types of football, including:

- Association football
- Australian rules football
- Gaelic football
- Gridiron football
  - American football
  - Arena football
  - Canadian football
- International rules football
- Rugby league football
- Rugby union football

Kicking is the act of propelling a ball by striking it with the foot or, depending upon the sport, the shin. Kicking is most common in Association Football, where only the two goalkeepers are allowed to use their hands. It is also the primary method of transferring the ball in Australian rules football and Gaelic football. Whereas most sports allow points to be scored by methods other than kicking, in Australian rules football kicking for goal is the only method allowed to score a goal and get the maximum six point score. Kicking is used less frequently in Rugby League, Rugby Union, American football, and Canadian football, and may be restricted to specialist positions, but it is still an important tactical skill in each sport.

== List of common kicking styles ==
The range of kicking styles available is typically influenced by the shape of the ball and the rules (whether hands can be used to carry or pick up the ball).

Football code	Off the ground	Grubber kick	Bomb	Drop kick	Drop punt	Punt	Torpedo punt	Checkside punt	Bicycle kick	Place kick	Dribbling
Association (soccer)	Yes	No	No	Goalkeeper	No	Specialist	No	No	Yes	Yes	Yes
Australian rules	Yes	Yes	Yes	Rare	Yes	Yes	Rare	Yes	Rare	Dropped	Rare
Gaelic	Yes	Yes	Yes	Yes	Yes	Yes	Yes	No	Yes	No	Rare
Gridiron (US & Canadian variations)	No	No	No	Rare	Yes	Yes	Yes	No	No	Yes	No
Rugby union	Yes	Yes	Yes	Yes	Yes	Restricted	Yes	Yes	No	Yes	Rare
Rugby league	Yes	Yes	Yes	Yes	Yes	Restricted	Rare	Yes	No	Yes	Rare

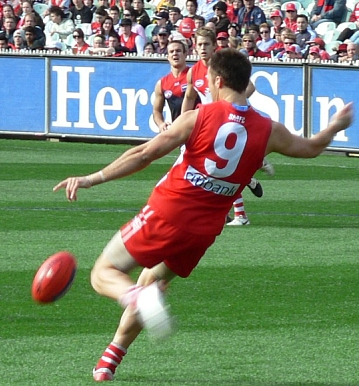
Precise field and goal kicking using the oval shaped ball is the most important skill in Australian rules.

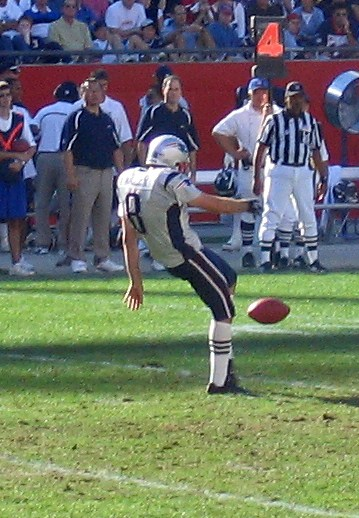
An American football punter.

== See also ==
- Kick-to-kick
