= Fumble =

Live loose ball in gridiron football

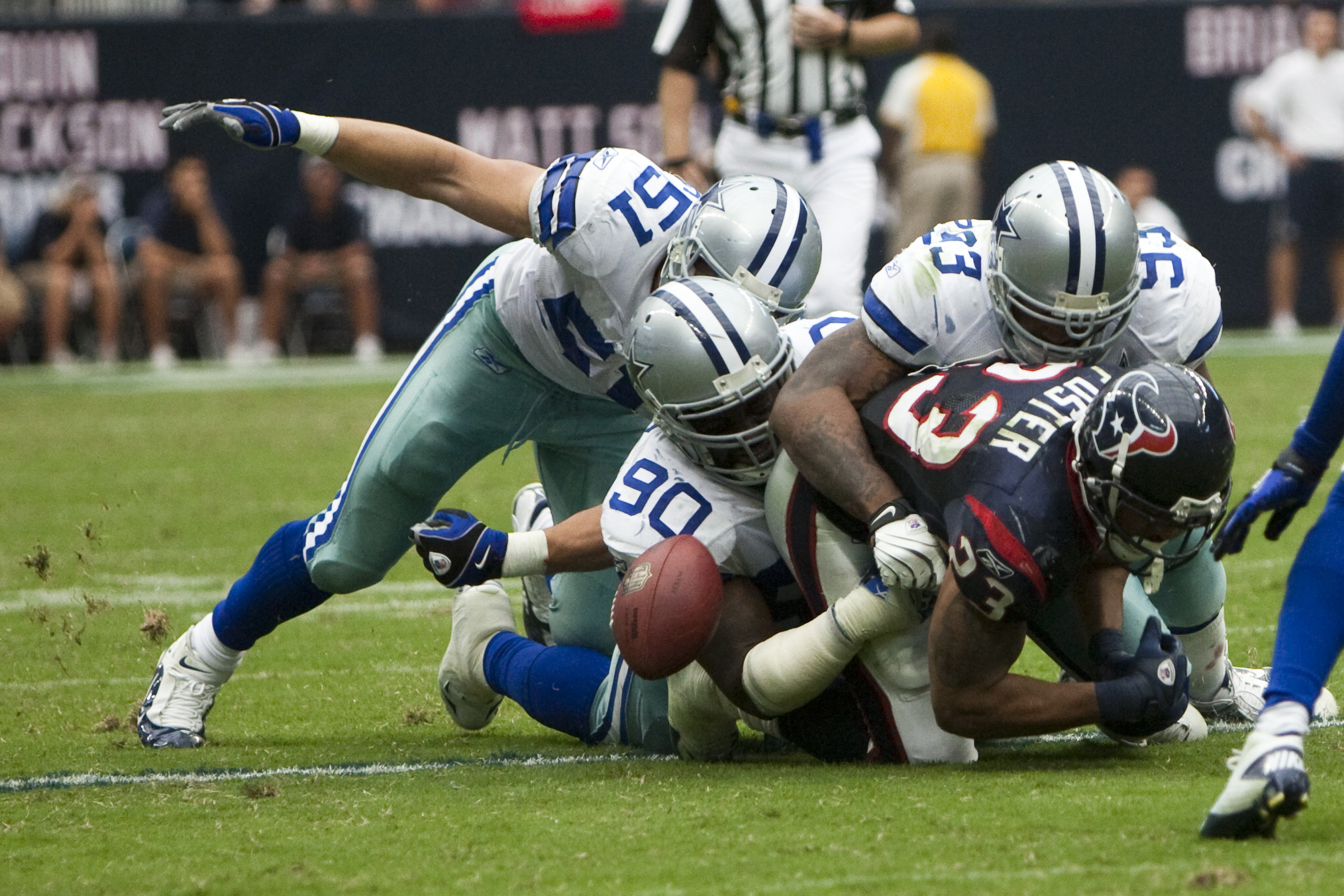
Houston Texan running back Arian Foster fumbles the ball against the Dallas Cowboys during a 2010 NFL regular season game.

The rate of fumbles by running backs in the NFL has decreased steadily since the AFL–NFL merger.

A fumble in gridiron football occurs when a player who has possession and control of the ball loses it before being downed (tackled), scoring, or going out of bounds. By rule, it is any act other than passing, kicking, punting, or successful handing that results in loss of ball possession by a player. Unlike other events which cause the ball to become loose, such as an incomplete pass, a fumbled ball is considered a live ball, and may be recovered and advanced by any member of either team.

A fumble may be forced by a defensive player who either grabs or punches the ball or butts the ball with their helmet (a move called "tackling the ball"). A fumbled ball may be recovered and advanced by either team (except, in American football, after the two-minute warning in either half/overtime or on 4th down at any point during the game, when the fumbler is the only offensive player allowed to advance the ball, otherwise the ball is ruled dead at the spot of the fumble, except when it is recovered for a loss).

A fumble is one of three events that can cause a turnover (the other two being an interception or a turnover on downs).

Under American rules a fumble may be confused with a muff. A muff occurs where a player drops a ball that he does not have clear possession of, such as while attempting to catch a lateral pass or improperly fielding a kicking play such as a punt (a player cannot "fumble" a loose ball). Ball security is the ability of a player to maintain control over the football during play and thus avoid a fumble. Thus, losing possession of the ball via a fumble includes not only dropping the ball before being downed; but, also having a ball taken away, or "stripped" from the runner's possession before being downed.

== Rules ==
If the ball is fumbled the defensive team may recover the ball and even advance it to their opponents' goal. The same is true for the offense, but usually, when the offense recovers the ball they simply try to down it. In American football, the offense cannot advance the ball if it recovers its own fumble on fourth down, or in the last two minutes of a half/overtime unless the fumbler recovers the ball (there are no such restrictions in Canadian football). However, the defense cannot advance the ball either if they fumble the ball back to the offense (unless it is recovered by the defensive fumbler). However, if the offense fumbles the ball, the defense recovers, and then fumbles back to the offense, they would get a new first down since possession had formally changed over the course of the play even though the ball had never been blown dead. In American football, there is no separate signal to indicate a fumble recovery. If the offense recovers its own fumble and down it, the official will indicate the recovery by a hand signal showing the next down. If the defense recovers the fumble, the official will indicate with a "first down" signal in the direction the recovering team is driving the ball. Some officials have erroneously used a "first down" signal when the offense recovers its own fumble and the recovery did not result in a first down.

It is not a fumble when a forward pass is attempted and is not caught. In this latter case, it is simply an incomplete pass. However, if the receiver catches the ball, but then drops it after gaining control of the ball, that is a fumble.

Any number of fumbles can be committed during a play, including fumbles by the team originally on defense. Most famously, Dallas Cowboys defender Leon Lett fumbled during Super Bowl XXVII while celebrating during his own fumble return.

A sometimes controversial maxim is "the ground cannot cause a fumble". If a player is tackled and loses control of the ball at or after the time he makes contact with the ground, the player is treated as down and the ball is not in play. However, in the NFL and CFL, if a ball carrier falls without an opponent contacting him, the ground can indeed cause a fumble. This is because in those leagues the ball carrier is not "down" unless an opponent first makes contact, or the runner is out of bounds. In most other leagues, as soon as the knee or elbow touches the ground, the ball carrier is considered down. It is also possible for the ground to cause a fumble in college football if the ball hits the ground before any part of the ball carrier's body (other than the hand or foot) touches the ground. An example was the fumble by Arkansas quarterback Clint Stoerner vs. Tennessee in 1998.

When a fumbled ball goes out of bounds before being recovered, the result varies:

- A fumble going out of bounds between the end zones is retained by the last team with possession (in Canadian football, the last team to touch the ball). If the ball was moving backwards with regard to the recovering team, it is spotted where it went out of bounds. If the ball was moving forwards, it is spotted where the fumble occurred (the fumble itself cannot advance the ball).
- If a ball is fumbled in the field of play, goes forward into the opponent's end zone, and then goes over the end line or sideline, a touchback is awarded to the defensive team.
- If a team fumbles the ball out of bounds in its own end zone (even if the ball moves forward out of the end zone before going out of bounds), or fumbles in the field of play and the ball then goes into that team's end zone and out of bounds, the result depends on which team caused the ball to enter the end zone. If the possessing team possessed or forced the ball into the end zone, it is a safety, subject to the momentum rules that apply to safeties. If the opponent forced the ball into the end zone, it is a touchback.
  - However, in the USFL and XFL, a ball fumbled by the offense within the field of play that goes out of bounds in the defensive team's end zone is not a touchback. Instead, the ball is spotted at the spot of the fumble, with the offense retaining possession unless the fumble occurred on fourth down before the offense reached the line to gain, in which case the defense receives possession.

A fumbled ball that is touched by an out-of-bounds player is considered an out-of-bounds fumble, even if the ball never leaves the field of play.

In addition, a punted or place-kicked ball that touches any part of a player on the receiving team, whether or not the player ever gains control, is considered to be live and is treated like a fumble. Also, lateral passes that are caught by a member of the opposing team are recorded as fumbles as opposed to interceptions.

== Play during fumbles ==
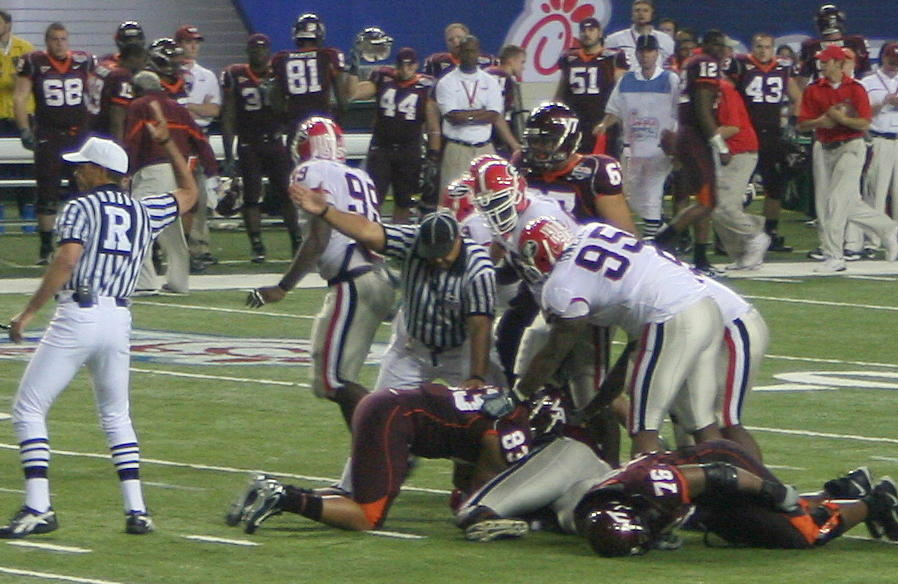
Officials sort out possession after a fumble at the 2006 Chick-fil-A Bowl between Georgia and Virginia Tech.

Since footballs tend to bounce in unpredictable ways, particularly on artificial turf, attempting to recover and advance a fumbled ball is risky even for those with good manual coordination. Coaches at lower levels of the game usually therefore prefer that players, particularly those such as interior linemen who do not normally handle the ball in the course of play, simply fall on the ball. Gaining or retaining possession is more important in most situations than attempting to advance the ball and possibly score, and there have been many instances where those attempting to do so have wound up fumbling the ball back to the other team.

Recovering and advancing a fumble is also made difficult, and potentially injurious, by the effect on play. Since neither team is on offense or defense while the ball remains loose, there are no restrictions on the type of contact allowed as long as all players are making legitimate efforts to recover it. A loose ball has been described as the only situation in football where the rules are suspended.

If the ball remains loose, every player on the field will eventually gravitate towards it, increasing the chaos around it. Spectators relish the suspense. Some players, particularly offensive linemen, have a reputation for taking advantage of the situation to do things to opponents that would otherwise draw penalties, since the officials' attention is necessarily focused on the ball and away from the players trying to get to it. Most commonly, players will "pile on" opponents already down trying to recover the ball. Some NFL players also report that pokes in the eyes, pinches or other abuse is common in post-fumble pileups, conduct which has sometimes led to confrontations, fights or even brawls.

The usual aftermath of a fumble, at every level of play, is a pile of players, many still squirming diligently despite the whistle, surrounded by teammates pointing upfield (the hand signal for a first down) while the officials slowly extricate them in an effort to determine who has won possession. If two different players have hands on the ball, it is often a judgement call on the officials' part as to which team gets it. In the NFL and CFL this has often been the occasion for coaches to call for a review of the instant replay.

Fumbles recovered for touchdowns in the end zone are often the only way offensive linemen score points.

=== Proper fumble recovery ===
The most obvious way to recover a loose football would be to fall prone atop it and cradle it between both arms against the abdomen. Amateur players are seen doing this all the time, particularly when playing touch football, and it can even be seen in professional contests.

However, coaches tell players not to do this in game situations if at all possible, since not only is the ball likely to squirt loose again once other players pile on, there is also a possibility of injury, such as a ruptured spleen, from the ball being driven into the soft organs with great force.

Instead, players are taught to fall on their sides and augment their cradling with a thigh and upper body, if possible. This greatly reduces both the chance of losing the ball and the potential for injury (at least from the ball).

Fumbles cannot be recovered with any body part that does not also involve at least one of the recovering player's arms.

Coaches are also increasingly encouraging their players to use the "scoop and score" method of picking it up and attempting to return it for a touchdown.

== Intentional fumbling ==
A very rarely used trick play known as the "fake fumble" calls for the quarterback to lay the ball on the ground as he backs up after receiving the snap, so that a pulling guard can pick it up and run the ball around the end. Coaches are very leery of calling this, however, as a team must be able to execute it flawlessly in order for it to have a chance of working in a game situation. The guard must also be able to run the ball competently and protect it when being tackled, both not usually part of the skill set for the position.

The "fake fumble" is in fact a real one as far as the rules are concerned, and if the defense manages to get the ball, the coach's judgement is likely to be questioned by fans and media alike. While it is a crowd pleaser when done properly, the risk far outweighs the likely reward. For this reason it is most likely to be used in informal touch football games. It was sometimes used in the college game before the NCAA banned it in 1992. It has almost never been used in the NFL or any other professional league.

The best-known fake fumble is probably the Fumblerooski play in the 1984 Orange Bowl (see below).

Fumbling forward, as the Holy Roller play (see below) demonstrated, once was a viable offensive tactic in desperate situations, but the rules have been changed to discourage that.

== Use in place of opening coin toss ==
The XFL, a competing pro league which played its sole season in 2001, used a fumble recovery instead of a coin toss to decide which team would get to choose whether to kick off or receive at the opening of the game and before overtime. A player from each team would sprint, alongside the other, toward a loose ball at the middle of the field, and whoever was able to gain possession won the right for their team to decide.

The idea was that such a key element of the game would be decided by a test of playing skill, not chance. Because of a high rate of injury in these events, the idea never caught on in any other level of football, and the coin toss remains the standard.

== Famous fumbles ==
Fumbles have sometimes played a role in deciding games. Some of these have been so unique as to not only earn their own distinctive sobriquets, but to change the way the game has been played afterwards.

=== College football ===
- The Fumblerooski

=== NFL ===
- The Holy Roller: The Oakland Raiders won a September 10, 1978, contest against divisional rivals the San Diego Chargers through another intentional fumble. With ten seconds left, down 20–14, quarterback Ken Stabler fumbled the ball forward to avoid being sacked at the Chargers' 15-yard line. Two other players, Pete Banaszak and Dave Casper, attempted to recover it but batted it forward when they could not. Finally it reached the end zone, where Casper fell on it for the tying touchdown, which cleared the way for the extra point that gave the Raiders the win. Officials decided to allow the touchdown on the grounds that the fumbles did not appear to be intentional and thus could not be considered forward passes, but Stabler freely admitted his was. Chargers fans have referred to the play as the Immaculate Deception ever since, and after the 1978 season, the NFL instituted the current rule that a forward fumble in the last two minutes of play (or on fourth down) can only be advanced, if recovered by the fumbling team, by the player who originally fumbled.
- The Miracle at the Meadowlands: Later that season, on November 19, 1978, the New York Giants were closing out an apparent 17–12 victory over the visiting Philadelphia Eagles. With 31 seconds left to play, they had the ball on third down. The Eagles had no timeouts left. All the Giants had to do was snap the ball one more time, and since they had knelt with the ball on the play before, it was expected they would do it and the game would be over. However, the kneel-down play was not universally accepted as an honorable way to win a game at the time, and Giants' offensive coordinator Bob Gibson ordered quarterback Joe Pisarcik (with whom he had been having a running feud over play-calling authority) to hand the ball off to fullback Larry Csonka for one more run up the middle to end the game. Csonka was reluctant to take the ball, and instead Pisarcik fumbled the handoff, allowing Eagles' cornerback Herman Edwards to return it for the winning touchdown. The Fumble, as outraged Giants' fans still call it, spurred the Eagles to the playoffs that season and precipitated a complete overhaul of the Giants' coaching and management staff, eventually reversing years of decline. Gibson was fired the next day. The following week, kneeling with the ball when possible to run out the clock and preserve a victory became standard operating procedure in the NFL.
- The Fumble: The dubious honor of having committed "The" fumble goes to Earnest Byner of the Cleveland Browns. On January 17, 1988, he lost the ball just short of the Denver Broncos' goal line with 65 seconds left in the AFC championship game. He appeared to be on his way to a certain touchdown until Jeremiah Castille barely managed to reach out and jar the ball loose from his grip. The touchdown-that-wasn't would have tied the game (assuming a made extra point) and kept alive the Browns' Super Bowl hopes. Instead, the Broncos spotted them a safety and the game ended in a 38-33 Broncos victory. The play has entered Cleveland sports lore as one of several instances in which the city's teams were frustrated at the last minute on the way to possible future glory.
- Super Bowl XXVII: Leon Lett's loss of the ball on the way to an apparent touchdown late in the game has gone down in football history as one of the most preventable fumbles. The Dallas Cowboys defensive tackle had recovered one of the Bills' record-setting five lost fumbles in late in the game and had slowed down as he approached the goal line, waving his arms out to his side in celebration. Buffalo Bills wide receiver Don Beebe, who had sprinted down the field unseen by Lett, caught up inside the 5 yard line and was able to knock the ball loose from behind. The ball subsequently rolled out of the end zone for a touchback, giving the ball back to the Bills. Beebe's team by that point had no chance to win, but Lett's premature showboating prevented the Cowboys from setting a new record for most points scored by one team in a Super Bowl. Despite an otherwise commendable career, that play and Lett's later unnecessary attempt to recover a blocked field goal, which cost Dallas the next season's Thanksgiving Day game, have led to him being ill-remembered by football fans.
- Romo's fumbled hold: In the 2006–07 NFL playoffs Wild Card round versus the Seattle Seahawks, Dallas Cowboys quarterback and kick holder Tony Romo dropped the ball as kicker Martín Gramática was set to kick a go-ahead 19-yard field goal. Romo recovered his fumble and attempted to run the ball in for a touchdown or a first down, but was tackled inches short of the first down marker by Jordan Babineaux, allowing the Seahawks to run the clock out and win the game. Since this game, a common stereotype has been used to paint Romo as a "choker" in big moments by detractors with this particular incident as the most common example.
- The butt fumble: On November 22, 2012, during the primetime Thanksgiving Day game between the New York Jets and New England Patriots, Jets quarterback Mark Sanchez slipped and collided with the backside of his teammate Brandon Moore and fumbled the ball, which was recovered by the Patriots' Steve Gregory and returned for a touchdown. Adding insult to injury, the Jets' Joe McKnight fumbled the ensuing kickoff, which Julian Edelman recovered and returned for another Patriots touchdown.

=== Professional Canadian football ===
- In the fourth quarter of the 42nd Grey Cup game in 1954, Chuck Hunsinger of the Montreal Alouettes lost the ball on the Edmonton Eskimos' 15-yard line. Edmonton's Jackie Parker recovered the bouncing ball on the 20 and ran 90 yards for what would prove to be the game-winning touchdown. Generations of fans, reviewing the film, have disagreed on whether Hunsinger fumbled or attempted a forward pass to an ineligible receiver.
- In the 105th Grey Cup in 2017, the Toronto Argonauts' Cassius Vaughn capitalized on a Calgary Stampeders fumble by Kamar Jorden at the Toronto nine-yard line and returned the ball for a Grey Cup-record-setting 109 yards for a touchdown. The two-point convert tied the game up 24–24 with under five minutes to play in regulation, and Toronto went on to win 27–24.

== In statistics ==
Game box scores commonly record how many fumbles a team made and how many it recovered. A fumble is credited to the last player who handled it from the possessing team, regardless of whether it may have been his fault or not.

== Records ==
=== NFL ===
==== Teams ====
- Most own fumbles, season: 56; Chicago Bears, 1938; San Francisco 49ers, 1978.
- Fewest fumbles, season: 6, New Orleans Saints, 2011.
- Most fumbles, game: 10; Phil-Pitt "Steagles" vs. New York Giants, October 9, 1943; Detroit Lions vs. Minnesota Vikings, November 12, 1967; Kansas City Chiefs vs. Houston Oilers, October 12, 1969; San Francisco vs. Detroit Lions, December 17, 1978.
- Most fumbles lost, season: 36, Chicago Cardinals, 1959.
- Fewest fumbles lost, season: 2, Kansas City Chiefs, 2002.
- Most fumbles lost, game: 8, St. Louis Cardinals vs. Washington Redskins, October 25, 1976; Cleveland Browns vs. Pittsburgh Steelers, December 23, 1990.
- Most opponents' fumbles, season: 50, Minnesota Vikings, 1963; San Francisco 49ers, 1978.
- Fewest opponents' fumbles, season: 11, Cleveland Browns, 1956; Baltimore Colts, 1982; Tennessee Titans, 1998.
- Most fumbles recovered, season: 58, Minnesota Vikings, 1963.
- Most fumbles recovered, game: 10, Denver Broncos (5 own, 5 opponents) vs. Buffalo Bills, December 13, 1964; Pittsburgh Steelers (5/5) vs. Houston Oilers, December 9, 1973; Washington Redskins (2/8) vs. St. Louis Cardinals, October 25, 1976
- Fewest fumbles recovered, season: 9, San Francisco 49ers, 1982.
- Most own fumbles recovered, season: 37, Chicago Bears, 1938.
- Fewest own fumbles recovered, season: 2; Washington Redskins, 1958; Miami Dolphins, 2000.
- Most opponents' fumbles recovered: 31, Minnesota Vikings, 1963.
- Fewest opponents' fumbles recovered: 3, Los Angeles Rams, 1974; Green Bay Packers, 1995.
- Most fumble recoveries for touchdowns, season: 5; Chicago Bears (1 own, 4 opponents'), 1942; Los Angeles Rams (1 own, 4 opponents'), 1952; San Francisco 49ers (1 own, 4 opponents'), 1965; Oakland Raiders (2 own, 3 opponents'), 1978.
- Most fumble recoveries for touchdowns, game: 2, many teams in many games.
- Most own fumble recoveries for touchdowns, season: 2; Chicago Bears, 1953; New England Patriots, 1973; Buffalo Bills, 1974; Denver Broncos, 1975; Oakland Raiders, 1978; Green Bay Packers, 1982 and 1989; New Orleans Saints, 1983; Cleveland Browns, 1986; Miami Dolphins, 1996; Buffalo Bills, 2000.
- Most own fumble recoveries for touchdowns, game: 2, Miami Dolphins vs. New England Patriots, September 1, 1996
- Most opponents' fumbles recovered for touchdowns, season: 4; Detroit Lions, 1937; Chicago Bears, 1942; Boston (AAFC), 1948; Los Angeles Rams, 1952; San Francisco 49ers, 1965; Denver Broncos, 1984; St. Louis Cardinals, 1987; Minnesota Vikings, 1989; Atlanta Falcons, 1991 and 1998; Philadelphia Eagles, 1995; New Orleans Saints, 1998; Kansas City Chiefs, 1999.
- Most opponents' fumbles recovered for touchdowns, game: 2, many times by many teams, most recently by the Green Bay Packers vs. St. Louis Rams, November 29, 2004.

==== Players ====
- Most fumbles, career: 166, Brett Favre, 1992–2010
- Most fumbles, season: 23; Kerry Collins, 2001 and Daunte Culpepper, 2002.
- Most fumbles, game: 7, Len Dawson, Kansas City Chiefs vs. San Diego Chargers, November 15, 1964.
- Most fumbles recovered, career: 56, Warren Moon.
- Most fumbles recovered, season: 12, David Carr, 2002.
- Most fumbles recovered, game: 4; Otto Graham, Cleveland Browns vs. New York Giants, October 25, 1953; Sam Etcheverry, St. Louis Cardinals vs. New York Giants, September 17, 1961; Roman Gabriel, Los Angeles Rams vs. San Francisco 49ers, October 12, 1969; Joe Ferguson, Buffalo Bills vs. Miami Dolphins, September 18, 1977; Randall Cunningham, Philadelphia Eagles vs. Oakland Raiders, November 30, 1986 (OT).
- Most own fumbles recovered, career: 56, Warren Moon.
- Most own fumbles recovered, season: 12, David Carr, 2002.
- Most own fumbles recovered, game: 4, holders the same as most fumbles recovered, game, above.
- Most opponents' fumbles recovered, career: 29, Jim Marshall
- Most opponents' fumbles recovered, season: 9, Don Hultz, 1963.
- Most opponents' fumbles recovered, game: 3, held by 15 different players, most recently Brian Young, St. Louis Rams vs. Baltimore Ravens, November 9, 2003.
- Longest fumble return: 104 yards, Jack Tatum, Oakland Raiders vs. Green Bay Packers, September 24, 1972; Aeneas Williams, Arizona Cardinals vs. Washington Redskins, November 5, 2000.
- Longest playoff fumble Return: 98 yards, Sam Hubbard, Cincinnati Bengals vs. Baltimore Ravens, January 15, 2023.
- Most fumble recoveries or returns for touchdowns, career: 6, Jason Taylor.
- Most fumble recoveries or returns for touchdowns, season: 2, over 30 players, most recently Jeremy Chinn Carolina Panthers 2020
- Most own fumbles recovered or advanced for touchdowns, career: 2; Ken Kavanaugh, Mike Ditka, Gail Cogdill, Ahmad Rashad, Jim Mitchell, Drew Pearson, Del Rodgers, Alan Richard, and Kevin Curtis.
- Most own fumbles recovered or advanced for touchdowns, season: 2; Rashad, 1974, Rodgers, 1982, and Curtis, 2007.
- Most opponents' fumbles returned or recovered for touchdowns, career: 6, Jason Taylor.
- Most opponents' fumbles returned or recovered for touchdowns, season: 2, over 30 players as described above ending with Chinn.
- Most opponents' fumbles returned or recovered for touchdowns, game: Fred "Dippy" Evans, Chicago Bears vs. Washington Redskins, November 28, 1948, Jeremy Chinn, Carolina Panthers vs Minnesota Vikings, November 29, 2020.
- Fewest fumbles, career (more than 400 touches): Jamaal Williams, never fumbled, 622 touches (through 2021 NFL season)
- Most consecutive touches without a fumble:
  - 712 (LaDainian Tomlinson, longest streak since 1991)
    - 870 (Steven Jackson, Rams/Falcons/Patriots RB-November 13, 2011 fumble against Browns was last fumble of career)

==== Games ====
- Most fumbles: 14, Washington Redskins (8) vs. Pittsburgh Steelers (6), November 14, 1937; Chicago Bears (7) vs. Cleveland Browns (7), November 24, 1940; St. Louis Cardinals (8) vs. New York Giants (6), September 17, 1961; Kansas City Chiefs vs. Houston Oilers, October 12, 1969.
- Most fumble recoveries for touchdowns: 3; Detroit Lions (2) vs. Minnesota Vikings (1), December 9, 1962 (2 own, 1 opponents'); Green Bay Packers (2) vs. Dallas Cowboys (1), November 29, 1964 (all opponents'); Oakland Raiders (2) vs. Buffalo Bills (1), December 24, 1967 (all opponents'); Oakland Raiders (2) vs. Philadelphia Eagles (1), September 24, 1995 (all opponents'); Tennessee Titans (2) vs. Pittsburgh Steelers (1), January 2, 2000 (all opponents').
- Most opponents' fumbles recovered for touchdowns: 3 (see last four above).

== See also ==
- Knock-on (disambiguation)
- List of National Football League annual forced fumbles leaders
