= Al Bloodgood =

American football player (1901–1947)

No. 23, 1
- Positions: Fullback, halfback, quarterback

Personal information
- Born: September 5, 1901; Beatrice, Nebraska, U.S.
- Died: March 26, 1947 (aged 45); Beatrice, Nebraska, U.S.

Career information
- High school: Beatrice (NE)
- College: Nebraska

Career history
- Kansas City Cowboys (1925–1926); Cleveland Bulldogs (1927); New York Giants (1928); Green Bay Packers (1930)

Awards and highlights
- NFL champion (1930); Tied NFL record of most dropkicked field goals in a single game (4)

Career NFL statistics
- All-purpose yards: 893
- Scoring points: 105
- Touchdowns: 6
- Stats at Pro Football Reference

Elbert "Al" Lorraine Bloodgood (September 5, 1901 – March 26, 1947) was an American professional football player in the National Football League (NFL). He played at the University of Nebraska. He graduated from Nebraska in 1924. He played five seasons in the NFL including the 1930 Green Bay Packers title team.

== Early life ==
Al Bloodgood was born in Beatrice, Nebraska and attended Beatrice High School where he became a Nebraska high school track state champion for the 100-yard dash in 1920, and the 440-yard dash and 880-yard relay in 1921. He graduated from high school in 1921.

== College football career ==
Bloodgood attended DePauw University and then at the University of Nebraska where he earned varsity letters as a quarterback in 1923 and 1924. At Nebraska, he played during the tenure of head football coach Fred Dawson and alongside Ed Weir and Verne Lewellen.

Bloodgood was a Cornhusker on the 1923 team that defeated Notre Dame University and head coach Knute Rockne's "Four Horsemen" for the second straight year. He was starting quarterback in the following year's 1924 game where the Cornhuskers lost 34–6 to the Fighting Irish.

== Professional football career ==
Bloodgood played 34 games during five seasons in the NFL between 1925 and 1930. He did not play in 1929.

Bloodgood made his professional debut in the NFL playing two years with the Kansas City Cowboys in 1925–1926. He was listed as a back with jersey number 23. On December 12, 1926, against the Duluth Eskimos he tied an NFL record (with Paddy Driscoll) of 4 drop-kicked field goals in a single game.

When the Kansas City Cowboys franchise folded at the end of 1926, he followed his player-coach LeRoy Andrews as the team essentially relocated as the Cleveland Bulldogs for its 1927 and final season. He is listed as a tailback and wore jersey number 1. It was with the Bulldogs that Bloodgood had his best year when he ran back a fumble for a touchdown, and was tied for sixth in league touchdowns and fifth in field goals.

In 1928 Bloodgood played for the New York Giants and was listed as blocking back. On September 30, in a game against the Pottsville Maroons, he returned a punt 95 yards for a touchdown, setting a club record that still stands.

After not playing during 1929, Bloodgood, back in the NFL, played pre-season football with the Green Bay Packers, playing once again with former Cornhusker teammate Verne Lewellen. At age 29 and in his final season, he played three games on the 1930 Green Bay Packers championship team, where he is listed as a back and special teams starter
