= Bomb (kick) =

High kick style in football

A bomb, also known as an up and under or a Garryowen, is a type of kick used in various codes of football. It is a high kick intended to send the ball relatively straight up, so players can get under it before it comes down (see hang time).

== Rugby league ==
The execution of a 'bomb' in rugby league involves putting up a high kick in general play. The ball often does not travel very far forward, giving the attacking team time to run ahead to where it is expected to land, providing the possibility of re-gaining possession amongst an un-set defensive line. Bombs are often used when close to the try-line, so that the attacking team's best jumpers have a chance to leap for the ball and come down with it in the in-goal area.

The result is a towering ball which should rotate end on end. The height of the kick makes the ball susceptible to wind which causes the ball to change direction. Also, the ball gathers speed as it falls closer to the ground and this combined with the swirling can also cause the ball to change direction, making it difficult for the opposition to take the ball cleanly.

In Australian rugby league, the bomb was popularised by Easts' and Parramatta's John "Bomber" Peard in the 1970s. However, by the 1980s, it became increasingly seen as a negative or unexciting tactic, and a rule change was made to lessen its effect: A bomb (or any type of kick) caught on the full in the in-goal area by the defending side now results in an automatic 20 metre tap restart, sometimes colloquially known as defusing the bomb. Grubber kicks or cross kicks are now often used in preference to bombing into the in-goal area. In the 1970s the phrase "up and under" became associated with Rugby League in Britain, when it became the catchphrase of Eddie Waring, an English rugby league coach, commentator and television presenter.

In recent times the "Up and Under" was mastered by Bobbie Goulding helping St Helens R.F.C. ('Saints') to the inaugural Super League title, and several others after that. It was a common feature of the Saints' play and, though it suffered criticism for its 'negative' quality (at the same time rugby union was under similar scrutiny for turning into a 'kicking' game), it was an extremely effective tactic. The risky nature of the ball (for the catcher) and the opportunity for the pursuing players to challenge for it made it an often comical and controversial move, particularly in the case of defensive players 'chickening out' under pressure.

Being able to secure bombs is a quality in fullbacks and wingers.

== Rugby union ==
In rugby union, the term 'bomb' is rarely used, with 'up and under', 'box-kick', or Garryowen (after the Garryowen Football Club that popularised the tactic) preferred. It allows the attacking team to disrupt the defensive line, take the defence's pressure off themselves and put offensive pressure on their opponents. However, the kicking team risks losing possession of the ball, after which the opposing team may counterattack. In rugby union, the opposing team may choose to call for a mark if the ball is behind the opposition's 22 metre line and caught cleanly.

== Australian rules football ==
Due to the requirement for kicks to travel more than 15 metres before a mark can be awarded, high short kicks are rarely deliberately used in Australian rules football. When they are used they are generally known as up and unders. The term bomb, however, is commonly used to describe a very long kick, especially one designed to just gain field position or an attempt to kick a goal, not as a pass to a specific player.

== Gridiron ==
The bomb kick is legal in Canadian football, under the condition that the person trying to recover the kick start behind or at the same yard line as the kicker. It was also legal in arena football, where rebound nets reduced the required angle needed for the kick to be effective; in arena football, the ball had to be kicked from the ground or through a drop kick, as punts were not legal. Bomb kicks are not generally legal in American football, where players are not allowed to recover their own team's kicks on scrimmage plays past their own line of scrimmage. A bomb kick that does not cross the line of scrimmage can, however, be recovered by any player on the offensive team, regardless of whether it is by Canadian or American rules or whether the player was ahead of or behind the kicker.

Even in gridiron codes where it is legal, the bomb kick is rarely encountered. The forward pass in those codes fulfills the purpose of the bomb kick more reliably and with less risk to the offensive team. The standard punt formation has all other players ahead of the punter (and thus not eligible to recover a bomb kick) to provide protection.

== See also ==
- Up 'n' Under is the name of a play made into a film. It followed the story of a pub team in a rugby league sevens competition.
- Punt kick
- Drop kick
- Grubber kick
- Onside kick
