= Knock-on =

Knock-on may refer to:

- Rugby terminology:
  - Knock-on (rugby league), error by the player in possession of the ball in rugby league football
  - Knock-on (rugby union), event where the ball is knocked forward in rugby union
- Causality-related terms:
  - Knock-on electron
  - Knock-on effect

== See also ==
- Fumble
