= Drop kick =

Type of football kick

A drop kick is a type of kick in various codes of football. It involves a player intentionally dropping the ball onto the ground and then kicking it either (different sports have different definitions) 'as it rises from the first bounce' (rugby) or 'as, or immediately after, it touches the ground' (gridiron football).

Drop kicks are used as a method of restarting play and scoring points in rugby union and rugby league. Also, association football goalkeepers often return the ball to play with drop kicks. The kick was once in wide use in both Australian rules footballand gridiron football, but it is rarely used anymore in either sport.

== Rugby football ==
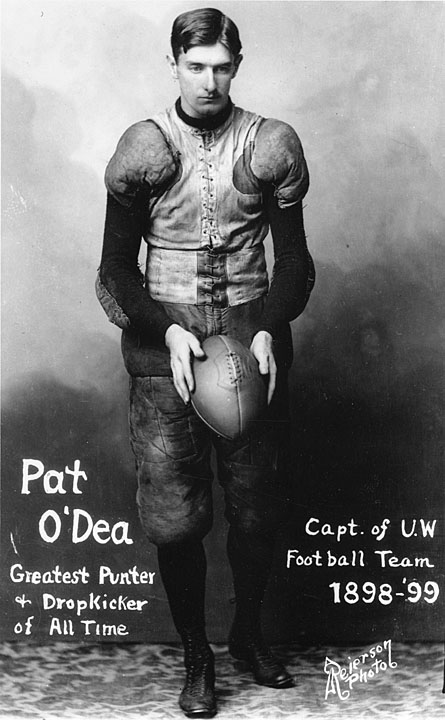
Pat O'Dea

=== Drop kick technique ===
The drop kick technique in rugby codes is usually to hold the ball with one end pointing downwards in two hands above the kicking leg. The ball is dropped onto the ground in front of the kicking foot, which makes contact at the moment or fractionally after the ball touches the ground, called the half-volley. The kicking foot usually makes contact with the ball slightly on the instep.

In a rugby union kick-off, or drop out, the kicker usually aims to kick the ball high but not a great distance, and so usually strikes the ball after it has started to bounce off the ground, so the contact is made close to the bottom of the ball.

=== Rugby league ===
In rugby league, drop kicks are mandatory to restart play from the goal line (called a goal line drop-out) after the defending team is tackled or knocks on in the in-goal area or the defending team causes the ball to go dead or into touch-in-goal. Drop kicks are also mandatory to restart play from the 20 metre line after an unsuccessful penalty goal attempt goes dead or into touch-in-goal and to score a drop goal (sometimes known as a field goal) in open play, which is worth one point.

Drop kicks are optional for a penalty kick to score a penalty goal (this being done rarely, as place kicks are generally used) and when kicking for touch (the sideline) from a penalty, although the option of a punt kick is usually taken instead.

=== Rugby union ===
In rugby union, a drop kick is used for the kick-off and restarts and to score a drop goal (sometimes called a field goal). Originally, it was one of only two ways to score points, along with the place kick.

Drop kicks are mandatory from the centre spot to start a half (a kick-off), from the centre spot to restart the game after points have been scored, to restart play from the 22-metre line (called a drop-out) after the ball is touched down or made dead in the in-goal area by the defending team when the attacking team kicked or took the ball into the in-goal area, and to score a drop goal (sometimes called a field goal) in open play, which is worth three points.

Drop kicks are optional for a conversion kick after a try has been scored. As in rugby league this is done rarely, as place kicks are generally used.

=== Rugby sevens ===
The usage of drop kicks in rugby sevens is the same as in rugby union, except that drop kicks are used for all conversion attempts and for penalty kicks, both of which must be taken within 40 seconds of the try being scored or the award of the penalty.

== Gridiron football ==
In both American and Canadian football, one method of scoring a field goal, fair-catch kick (American only), or extra point is by drop-kicking the football through the goal, although the technique is virtually never used in modern play.

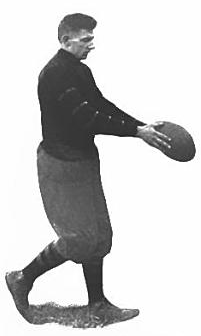
Zach Curlin drop kicking

It contrasts with the punt, wherein the player kicks the ball without letting it hit the ground first, and the place kick, wherein the player kicks a stationary ball off the ground: "from placement". A drop kick is significantly more difficult; as Jim Thorpe explained in 1926 when both kick types were common, "I regard the place kick as almost two to one safer than the drop kick in attempting a goal from the field."

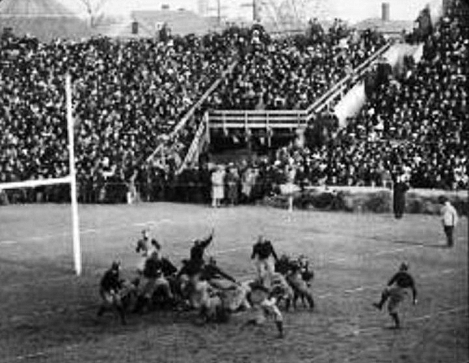
Charles Brickley's drop kick, the sole score as Harvard defeats Dartmouth 3–0 in 1912

The drop kick was often used in early football as a surprise tactic. The ball was "hiked" or lateraled to a back, who faked a run or pass, then drop-kicked a field goal attempt. This method of scoring worked well in the 1920s and early 1930s, when the ball was rounder at the ends, similar to a modern rugby ball.

Early football stars Thorpe, Charles Brickley, Frank Hudson, Paddy Driscoll, and Al Bloodgood were skilled drop-kickers; Driscoll in 1925 and Bloodgood in 1926 hold a tied NFL record of four drop kicked field goals in a single game. Driscoll's 55-yard drop kick in 1924 stood as the unofficial record for field goal range until Bert Rechichar kicked a 56-yard field goal (by placekick) in 1953.

The ball was made more pointed at the ends in 1934; this change is generally credited to Shorty Ray, a college football official at the time, and later the NFL's head of officiating. This made passing the ball easier, as was its intent, but made the drop kick almost immediately obsolete because the more pointed ball did not bounce up from the ground reliably. The drop kick was supplanted by the place kick, which cannot be attempted out of a formation generally used as a running or passing set. While it remains in the rules, the drop kick is seldom seen, and as explained below, is rarely effective when attempted.

In Canadian football, there are no formal restrictions on the circumstances under which a drop or a place kick can be attempted.

=== NFL ===
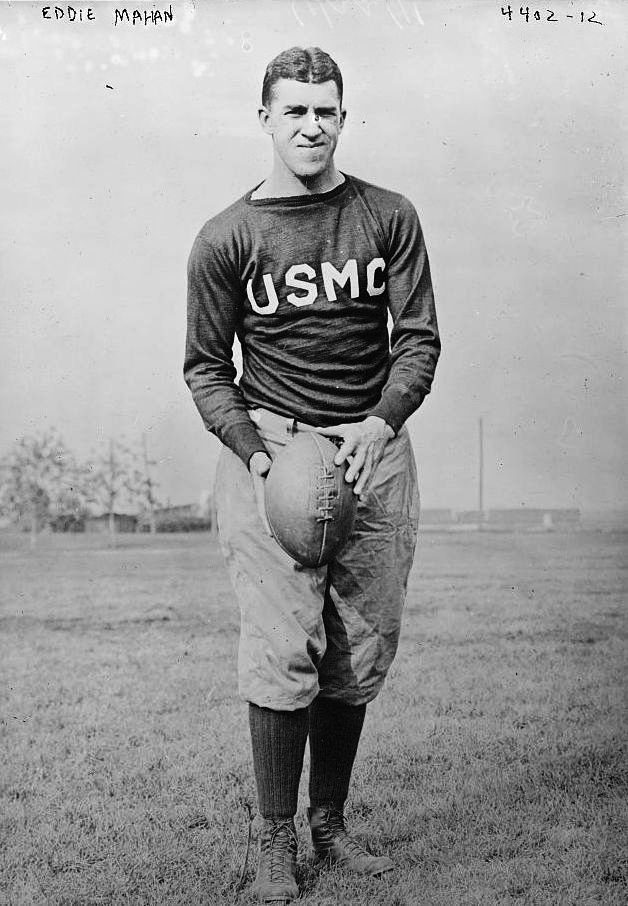
Eddie Mahan preparing to drop kick

Since 1941, the only successful drop kick for points in the NFL was by Doug Flutie, the backup quarterback of the New England Patriots, against the Miami Dolphins on January 1, 2006, for an extra point after a touchdown. Flutie, 43 at the time, was given the opportunity to make a historic kick in what was his last play in the NFL. Flutie estimated he had "an 80 percent chance" of making the drop kick.

The last successful drop kick before 2006 in the NFL was executed 64 years earlier in 1941, on an extra point by Ray McLean of the Chicago Bears, against the New York Giants in the NFL Championship Game at Chicago's Wrigley Field on December 21. The last drop kick for a field goal was a nine-yarder by player-coach Dutch Clark of the Detroit Lions in 1937 against the Chicago Cardinals on September 19. The All-America Football Conference (AAFC) saw its last successful drop kick in 1948, when Joe Vetrano of the San Francisco 49ers drop kicked an extra point after a muffed snap in a 31–28 home loss to the undefeated Cleveland Browns on November 28.

Still rarely but more commonly, kickers have attempted drop kicks from kick-offs or free kicks, especially in the case of onside kicks. Patriots kicker Stephen Gostkowski took an onside drop kick on a free kick against the Pittsburgh Steelers on October 30, 2011. Seattle Seahawks punter Michael Dickson, an Australian punter who considered himself more adept at drop kicking than place kicking, has drop kicked both kick-offs and onside kick-offs when called on to serve as back-up kicker. In 2019, Baltimore Ravens' kicker Justin Tucker drop-kicked a short, high kick-off against the Kansas City Chiefs with 2:01 left in the fourth quarter to force a fair catch and prevent the Chiefs from running out the clock; it was later confirmed that this kick was illegal, as Tucker had kicked the ball not immediately after it bounced, but rather after it had bounced and reached the apex of its rebound.

=== Arena football ===
In the former Arena Football League, a drop-kicked extra point was worth two points, rather than one point, while a drop-kicked field goal counted for four points rather than three, a rule that has survived into Arena Football One. The last conversion of a drop kick in the AFL was by Geoff Boyer of the Pittsburgh Power on June 16, 2012; it was the first successful conversion in the AFL since 1997. In 2022, Salina Liberty kicker Jimmy Allen successfully converted three drop kick PAT attempts against the Topeka Tropics in a Champions Indoor Football game. Allen also converted a drop kick PAT playing for the Iowa Barnstormers in the Indoor Football League during a game against the Colorado Crush during a 2016 game.

In 2018, Maine Mammoths kicker Henry Nell converted a drop kick as a PAT against the Massachusetts Pirates in the National Arena League. Nell went on to kick six drop-kicked PATs for AF1's Albany Firebirds in 2025, against the Corpus Christi Tritons; the Tritons, playing with a decimated roster of mostly replacement players, were on the losing end of an exceptionally lopsided match, allowing Nell to experiment with the drop kick. Nell declined a seventh opportunity to drop kick a PAT, instead using a one-point placekick to round the Firebirds' point total to an even 100 points. Nell had learned the drop kick as a professional rugby union player in his native South Africa and came to the United States after having a vision of himself playing the American game, despite not knowing what the game was. Manny Higuera of the Washington Wolfpack would be the first AF1 player to kick a field goal via drop kick that same year, scoring the only four points in a 71–4 loss to the Salina Liberty, a rare (if not unprecedented) example of a professional gridiron football team finishing with a score of four points.

== Australian rules football ==
Once the preferred method of conveying the ball over long distances, the drop kick has been superseded by the drop punt as a more accurate means of delivering the ball to a fellow player. Drop kicks were last regularly used in the 1970s, and by that time mostly for kicking in after a behind and very rarely in general play. AFL historian and statistician Col Hutchison believes that Sam Newman was the last player to kick a set-shot goal with a drop kick, in 1980, although goals in general play from a drop kick do occur on rare occasions, including subsequent goals by players such as Alastair Lynch and Darren Bewick.

Hutchison says drop kicks were phased out of the game by Norm Smith in defence due to their risky nature; Ron Barassi, a player Smith coached, took this on board for his own coaching career, banning it for all but Barry Cable, who, according to Hutchison, was a "magnificent disposer of the ball". Similarly, in 1971, under Port Adelaide coach Fos Williams, Williams had a rule that nobody playing in his side could do a drop kick. However, according to teammate Brian Cunningham, after Russell Ebert kicked a couple of goals in a game with a drop kick, Williams acknowledged Ebert's skill and made a special dispensation for him—and him alone.

== Association football ==
Some goalkeepers use drop kicks as an alternative to punting, as they provide greater speed and accuracy.

== See also ==
- Drop goal
- Grubber kick
- Bomb kick
- Glossary of American football
- Dropped-ball
