= Punt (Australian football) =

Way of kicking a ball in Australian rules football

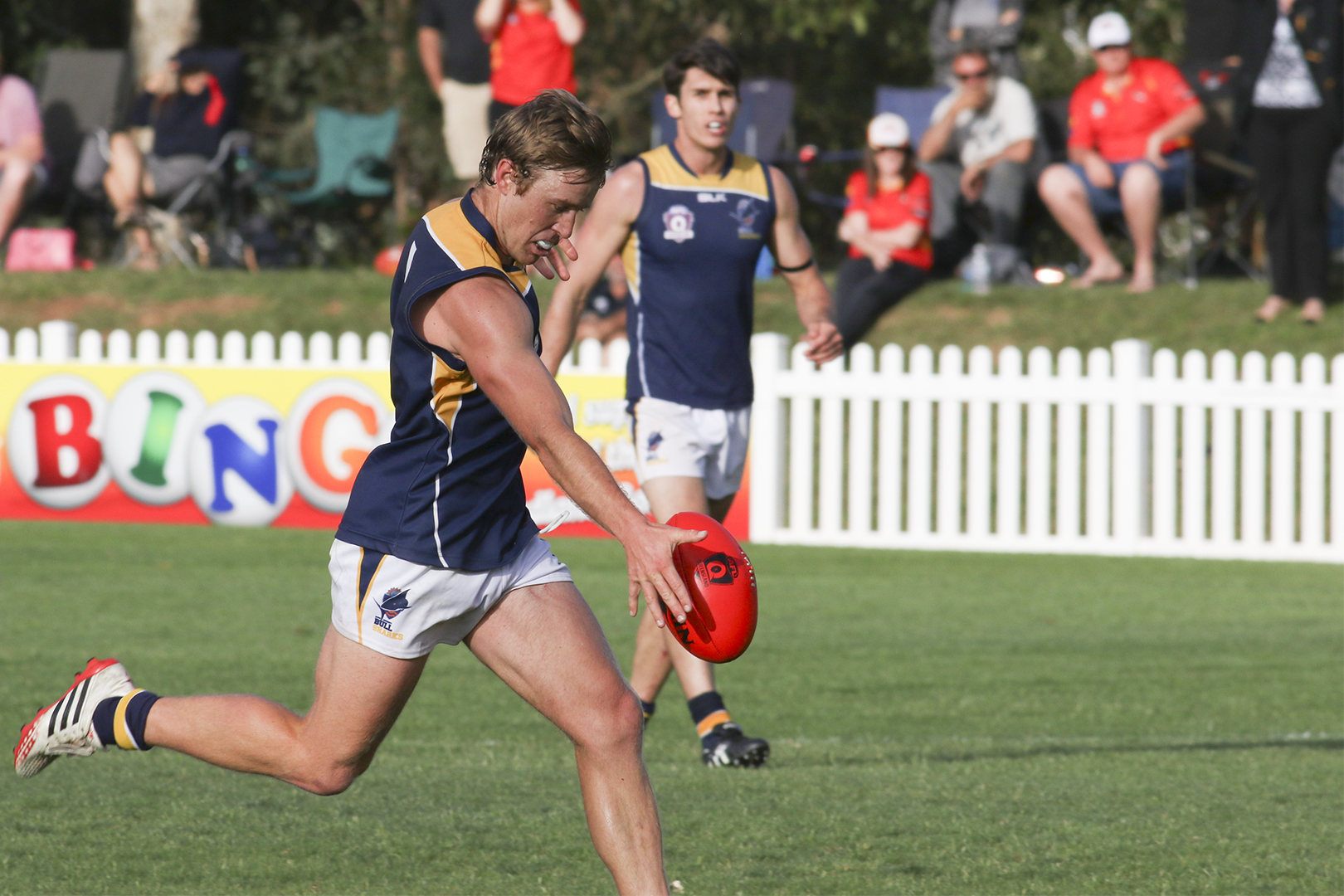

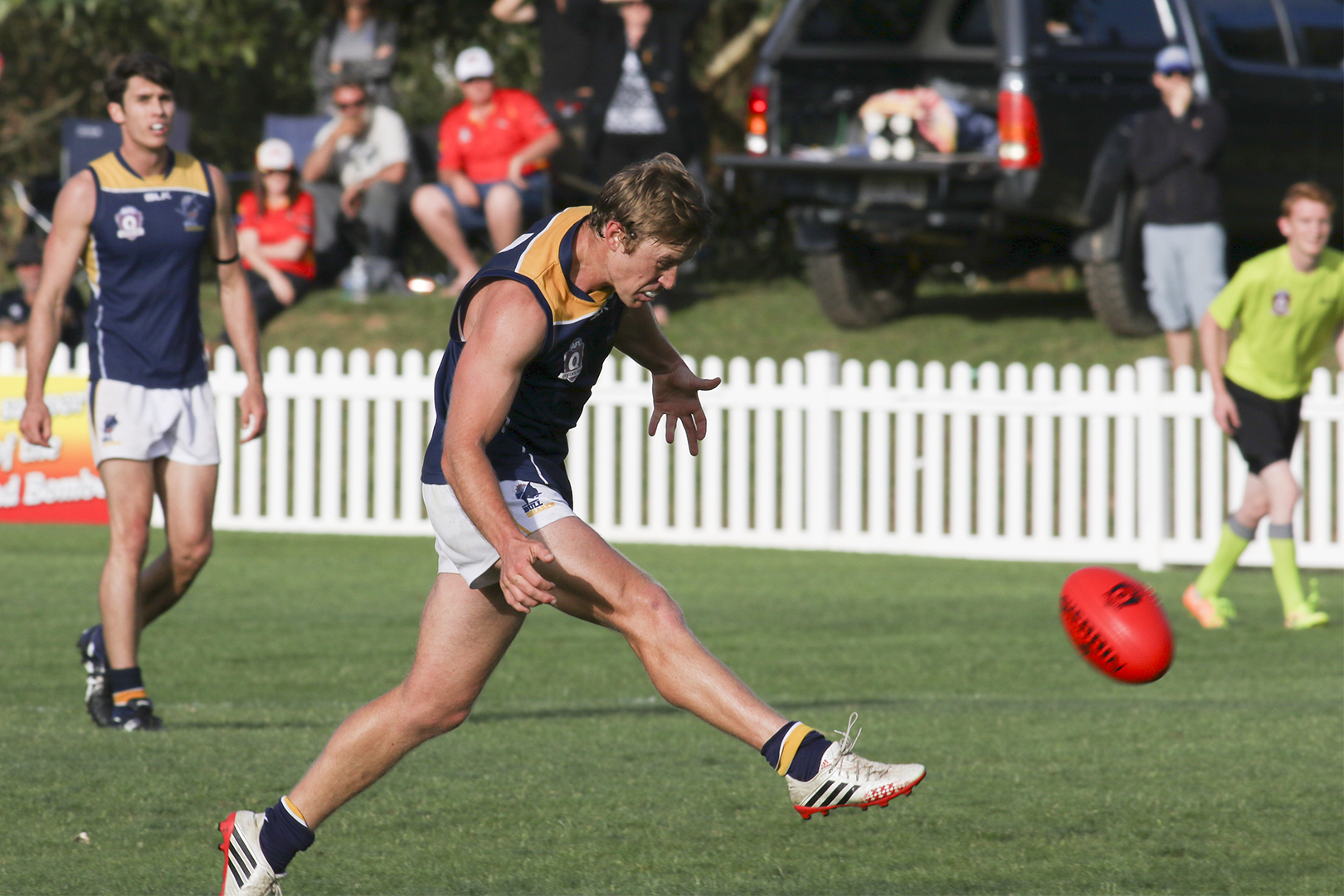
Footballer executes a drop punt

The punt kick is a common style of kicking in Australian rules football. It is a kick where the ball is dropped from the players' hands and kicked slightly off the longer centre line of the ball before it hits the ground. It is the primary means of kicking the ball in Australian football and is similar to punts used tactically in other football codes, such as American and Canadian football.

There are different styles of kicking depending on how the ball is held in the hand.

The most common style of kicking seen in today's game, principally because of its superior accuracy, is the drop punt, where the ball is dropped from the hands down, almost to the ground, to be kicked so that the ball rotates in a reverse end over end motion as it travels through the air. Other commonly used kicks are the torpedo punt (also known as the spiral, barrel, or screw punt), where the ball is held flatter at an angle across the body, which makes the ball spin around its long axis in the air, resulting in extra distance (similar to the traditional motion of an American football punt), and the checkside punt or "banana", kicked across the ball on the outside of the foot is used to curve the ball (towards the right if kicked off the right foot) towards targets that are on an angle. There is also the "snap", which is almost the same as a checkside punt, except that it is kicked off the inside of the foot and curves in the opposite direction. It is also possible to kick the ball so that it bounces along the ground. This is known as a grubber or dribble kick. Grubbers can bounce in a straight line, or curve to the left or right.

Until the end of the 19th century the punt kick was maligned as the choice of the novice player, with the drop kick and place kick the preferred modes of kicking the football. Today the punt kick is practically the only form of kicking in the game.

== Drop punt ==
Video of a drop punt

In modern Australian rules football, the drop punt is the most common method of kicking the ball. For a drop punt the ball is held with its long axis almost vertical, and dropped and kicked before it hits the ground, resulting in the ball spinning backwards end over end in flight. It is considered more accurate and easier to mark than a regular punt kick, which is held and kicked with its long axis flat and does not spin in the air.

Jack Dyer is generally credited with inventing the drop punt during his playing days with the Richmond Football Club in the 1930s. Horrie Clover and the Collier brothers, Albert and Harry, are also attributed with being the first to use the kick regularly. In the 1960s and 1970s, Peter McKenna was one of the first great exponents of the drop punt for goalkicking over long distances, after many decades of the kick usually being used for shorter distances.

In gridiron football it is referred to as a pooch punt or quick kick, a kick used by punters when the team is too far out for a field goal and too close to kick a normal punt because the ball will probably go into the end zone, losing field position in the resulting touchback. The kick has gradually replaced the less effective "coffin-corner kick", which was similar to rugby football's "kicking for touch" where the object was to put the ball out of bounds near the opposition goal. Like Australian rules football drop punts, the pooch punt requires the punter to control the distance and former Australian footballers like Darren Bennett and Ben Graham are generally credited with increasing the popularity of this kick in the National Football League.

== Torpedo punt ==
The torpedo punt (also known as screw punt or spiral punt) is the longest type of punt kick. In flight, the ball spins about its long axis, instead of end over end (like a drop punt) or not at all (like a regular punt kick). This makes the flight of the ball more aerodynamic, but more difficult to catch (or mark in some football codes).

In Australian rules football, the kick has become less common since the 1980s, as modern tactics have meant that accuracy has become typically more important than distance in field kicking; coaches now prefer the use of the drop punt in general field play. The kick may still be seen when a player needs additional distance or when a game is played in wet weather and forward movement by conventional methods is more difficult as a result. If kicked correctly, an Australian football can travel over 80 metres, while a normal punt will travel less distance. Australian rules footballer Gordon Rattray, who played his football with the Fitzroy Football Club between 1917 and 1928, is credited as the first player to use the torpedo punt.

== Checkside punt ==
The checkside punt is a kicking style used in Australian rules football, rugby league and rugby union. When kicked, it bends away from the body. For the true checkside, the ball is held with ends pointing to 2 and 8 o-clock (for a right-footed kick) and is kicked more off the outside of the boot with the ball spinning at an opposite direction to the swing of the leg. This enables the ball to have a greater curving effect, thus opening up the face of the goals to give a larger goal face.

The kick is sometimes also called a "banana kick" in Victoria, although in South Australia, the two terms refer to different variations of the kick. In South Australia, a banana kick is defined as being "booted from the opposite pocket".

=== Origins ===
The origins of the checkside punt remain a matter of some debate.

In the early 1890s, Allen Burns, who played Australian rules with the (then) Victorian Football Association club South Melbourne, was renowned for what seems to be an early version of the banana kick. The following is taken from newspaper reports of the match between Fitzroy and South Melbourne on Saturday 23 June 1894, which was played in showers of rain, on a very wet and slippery ground, with a very heavy and very wet leather football:

A mistake by the Fitzroy backs gave Allan [sic] Burns a chance at such an angle that a goal seemed impossible, and his team were urging him not to try; but he took the shot—a forty-yards one—with the posts almost in a line, and, to everyone's amazement and the South's delight, scored a wonderful goal …
In obtaining goals at difficult angles Burns has few rivals on the football field. He has the power of screwing the ball similar to a billiard player. His second goal on Saturday was one of the impossible shots in which it was almost a certainty that the ball would go right past, and the peculiar twist he appeared to get on as the ball darted through is one of those tricks of the game which a man should be able to patent …

Also, c.1908, there was Fitzroy and Essendon's Paddy Shea:

"Paddy was an accomplished drop, punt and place kick and he was the only forward I knew (and still know [viz., in 1954]) who could make a ball swerve in the air from his boot as a bowler can from his hand.
He could stand near a boundary post and swing it with certainty between the goal posts.
That master football tactician Jack Worrall, who coached Essendon after he left Carlton, had to see Paddy at practice before he was convinced of his ability.
Worrall had never before seen it in his many years association with the game as player and coach." — George Hale, in The Sporting Globe, 5 June 1954.

Also, in the mid-1940s, the Tasmanian footballer Ted Collis, who played with Hawthorn, in 1946:

"Ted Collis, the Tasmanian at Hawthorn, is unorthodox in his kicking methods. Shooting for goal at an angle last night, he kicked eight through from 10 shots. He held the ball side on, and it went through like a boomerang." — The Argus, 3 May 1946.

Sporting journalist Keith Butler photographed and wrote about Lindsay Head's use of the kick in 1959. Peter Endersbee, as a 10-year-old, had seen Head use the kick at Unley Oval, and later used it himself to kick successive goals from "impossible angles" in the 1968 grand final. Endersbee later credited Jack Oatey with helping him perfect the kick. Other players that used the kick effectively were Blair Campbell, Peter Daicos, and, more recently, Eddie Betts.

== See also ==
- Grubber kick
- Bomb kick
- Drop kick
