= Place kick =

Kicking play in football

The place kick is a type of kicking play commonly used in American football, association football (soccer), Canadian football, rugby league, and rugby union. It was historically used in Australian rules football, but it was phased out of the game more than 100 years ago.

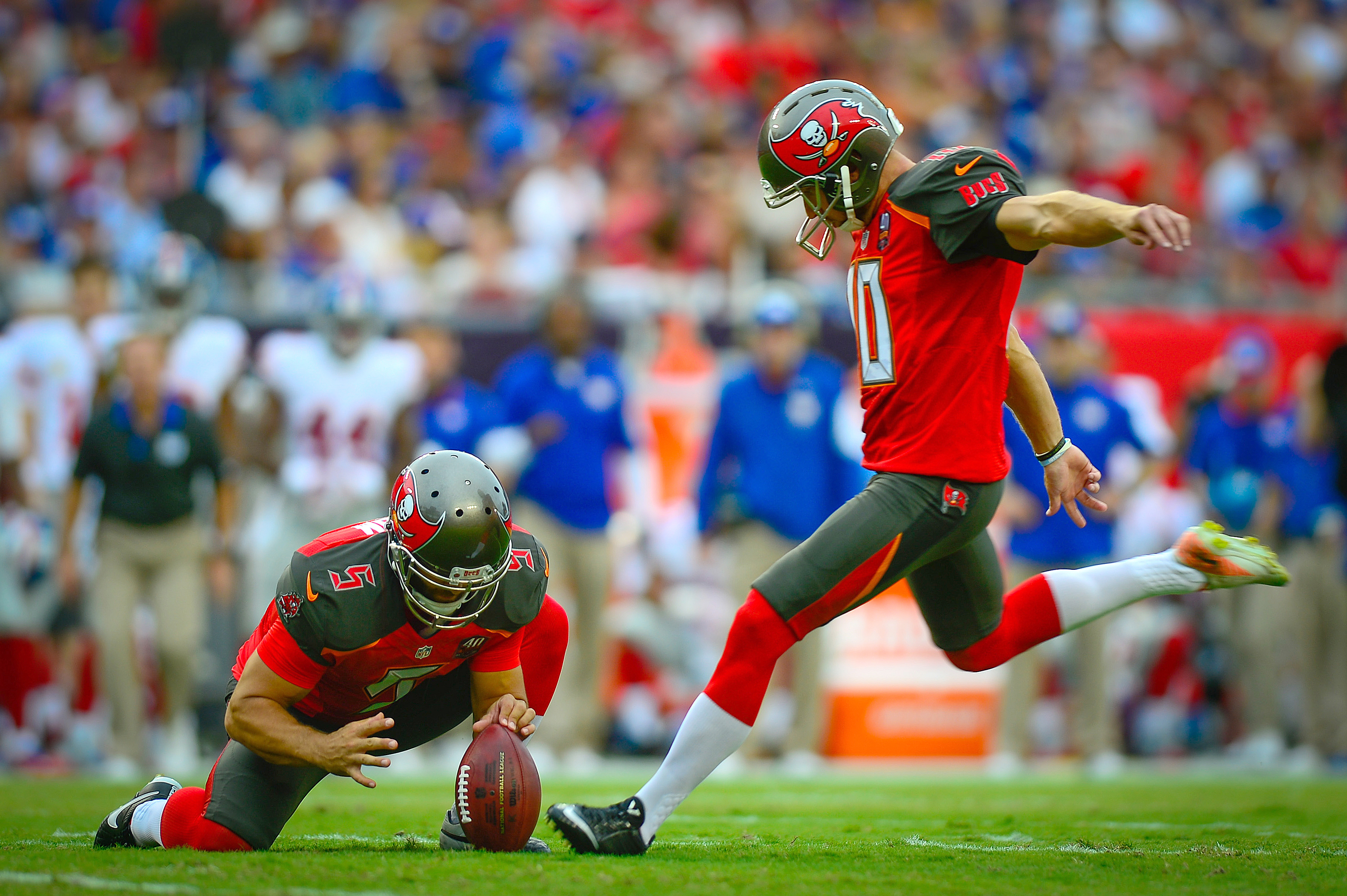
Kicker Connor Barth (right) attempts a field goal during an NFL game in 2015, while Jake Schum (left) serves as the holder

== Gridiron football ==
Place kicks are used in American football and Canadian football for kickoffs, extra points, and field goals. The place kick is one of the two most common forms of kick in gridiron-based football codes, along with the punt. The punt, however, cannot score points (except in Canadian football where it counts as a single). The place kick is the most common kick used in most indoor football games, including the former North American Arena Football League (AFL); punting was not legal in AFL play. A specialist player named the placekicker is generally the only member of the team who attempts place kicks, and is generally not used for any other role on the team. In the USA's National Football League teams, placekickers are generally able to successfully kick a field goal from at least 50 yards away, although kicks from 60 yards or beyond are rarely attempted or successful.

Place kicking typically involves placing the ball either directly on the turf, a mound of sand, a hole in the turf, or a plastic tee is sometimes used to keep the ball in position. A player called a holder is required to hold a ball upright during field goal and extra point attempts, as the ball is placed directly on the turf. This two-player process is a legacy of the sport's original 19th century rules which were based on 1871 rugby union laws. When weather conditions prevent the ball from standing on its tee by itself, a holder can be used during kickoffs (although this is uncommon).

In most forms of gridiron football, a place kick during timed play that travels through the uprights is a field goal worth three points; on a free play following a touchdown, it is worth one point; most leagues (including the NFL) require the ball to be placed directly on the turf with a holder.

In a few indoor football leagues, a kickoff that travels through the uprights results in an award of one point, although this practice is becoming less common with the collapse of the AFL (formerly the largest indoor gridiron football league in the world).

In the comic strip Peanuts, Lucy frequently holds the football to allow Charlie Brown to place kick but invariably pulls it away at the last second, causing Charlie to fall on his back.

== Association football ==
Place kicks in association football are the corner kick, free kick, goal kick, kick-off and penalty kick.

== Rugby league ==
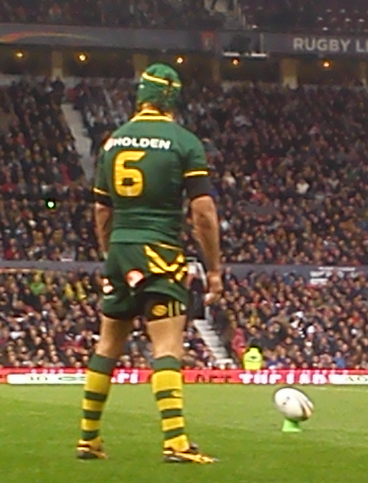
Johnathan Thurston preparing to take a place kick for Australia at the 2013 Rugby League World Cup.

The place kick is commonly used in rugby league for kick offs and most kicks at goal (penalty goals and conversions).

The lack of a consistently successful place kicker in a team can be detrimental to a team. Anybody on the team can take a penalty or conversion kick although there is often a regular kicker. Sometimes teams will use different players to kick depending on what side of the field the kick is to be taken from.

=== Place of kick ===
Kick offs are taken from the centre of the halfway line. A kick at goal from a penalty kick can be taken at any point along an imaginary line parallel to the touchline between the place the offence was marked by the referee and the kicker's goal line. Conversion attempts may be taken at any point along an imaginary line parallel to the touchline from where the try was scored.

=== Placing the ball ===
Most kickers use some form of aid to allow them to strike a preferred part of the ball. Popular aids used include kicking tees and mounds of sand on which to place the ball. Players might also use their boot to mould the ground where the ball will be placed, making a divot behind the ball to allow greater access to the kicking foot.

Kickers attempt to position the ball in a way that allows them to kick the ball's "sweet spot". Kicking the sweet spot will result in the ball travelling further and is located about a third of the way up the ball.

=== Kick ===
The most common kicking style is the round-the-corner kick, which tends to hook the ball to the left for a right footed kicker.

Kickers usually pace out their kick before taking it. This begins with the kicker standing over the ball with their feet in kicking positions. They then measure out a run up. When the ball is kicked, usually with the instep of the foot, the kicker will follow through with their swing.

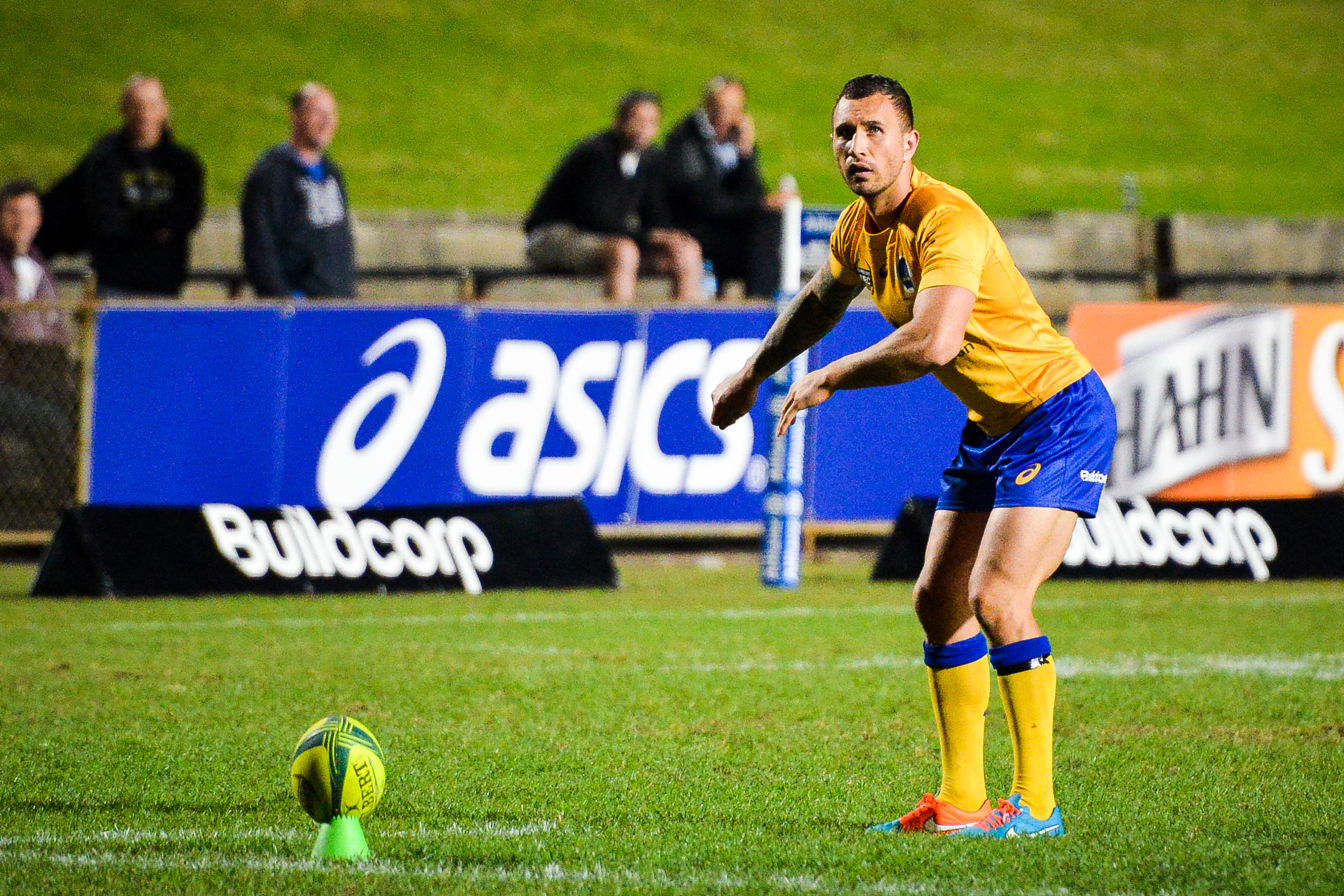
Rugby union player Quade Cooper preparing to take a place kick for Brisbane City.

Most of the top kickers can kick a goal from approximately 55m, or just inside their own half.

== Rugby union ==
In rugby union, the most common position for a goal kicker to play is fly-half as that position requires good kicking skills from hand. Slightly less commonly, the fullback will kick (another position which requires kicking from hand). If the goal kicker is neither of those two positions, the remaining three-quarter backs and scrum-half might kick. Goal kicking forwards are extremely rare, but not unknown, the most notable in recent years having been the Australian second row John Eales. The rules for place kicking have changed over time and originally required the ball to be placed by a different player to the kicker. The opposing side may charge (run) at a place-kicker making a conversion goal attempt, but not at a penalty goal attempt.

== Australian rules football ==
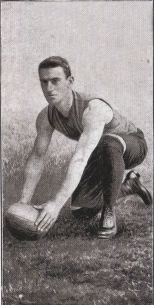
Melbourne's Vin Coutie preparing to take a standard Australian Rules place kick.

In the early decades of the sport of Australian rules football, place kicks were regularly used for taking set shots for goal after a mark or free kick, and occasionally for the purposes of kicking off after a behind. The use of a place kick in these circumstances was not required by the laws of the game, nor was it used universally, and many players preferred punts or drop kicks.

To execute with the oval ball, a divot would be created with the heel in the direction of the goal; the ball would be placed at a slight upward angle in the divot with its long axis pointed at the goal.

Place kicking was considered the longest and most accurate type of kick for a skilled practitioner, but more erratic than a punt for a player who was less adept. The laws allowed a player to place the ball for a place kick, take a run-up, and then regather the ball and play on instead of kicking it, in order to catch defenders off guard.

The use of place kicking declined rapidly from as early as the late 1910s, and it was considered a lost art by the late 1920s, partly due to the increased speed of the game and stoppages of the game to execute one. Aside from any of these time issues, another considerable factor in the eventual disappearance of the place kick was that the changes to the football's shape, design, and constituent materials — and, especially, according to ex-Melbourne player Les Rainey in the late 1930s, to a very significant reduction in the weight, the thickness of the soles, and robustness of the standard football boot. Rainey surmised that it had made the once-standard place kick, especially over longer distances, a far more difficult kick to execute.

Rarely, some players continued to use place kicks until as late as the 1950s, but the skill is entirely obsolete in serious modern football. There have been a couple of televised exceptions, but such uses were for comedic effect and are not attempted in professional football. For example, in the 1996 Centenary Legends Match, AFL Hall of Famer Don Scott performed a place kick in the general course of play; and, Patrick Cripps, playing in the pre-season 2019 AFLX Grand Final, performed a place kick from a set shot (with a holder in the gridiron football style), successfully making the goal.

== See also ==
- Placekicker, a position in American football.
- Drop kick
- Punt (American and Canadian football)
