= Mark (Australian rules football) =

Skill in Australian rules football

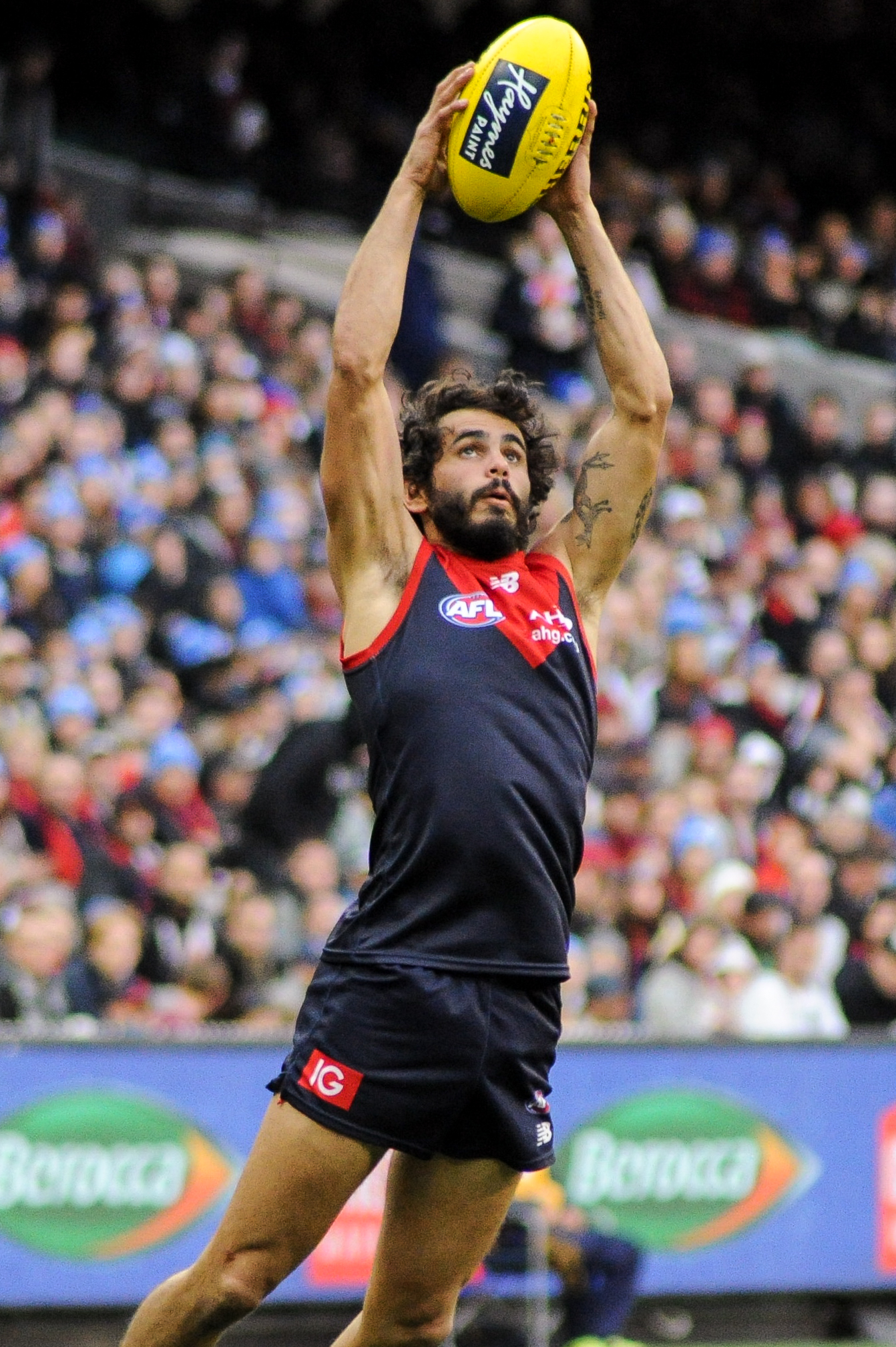
Jeff Garlett of the Melbourne FC marking the ball

A mark in Australian rules football is the catch of a kicked ball which earns the catching player a free kick. The catch must be cleanly taken, or deemed by the umpire to have involved control of the ball for sufficient time. A tipped ball, or one that has touched the ground cannot be marked. Since 2002, in most Australian competitions, the minimum distance for a mark is 15 metres (16 yards or 49 feet).

Marking is one of the most important skills in Australian football. Aiming for a teammate who can mark their kick is the primary focus of any kicking player not kicking for goal. Marking can also be one of the most spectacular and distinctive aspects of the game, and the best mark of the AFL season is awarded with the Mark of the Year, with similar competitions running across smaller leagues.

The four most prolific markers in the history of the Australian Football League – Nick Riewoldt (2,944), Gary Dempsey (2,906), Stewart Loewe (2,503) and Matthew Richardson (2,270) – also stand out for each achieving a career average of around eight marks per game. A 2003 AFL match, between St Kilda and Port Adelaide, set a record of 303 marks in a single game.

== Rules ==
Upon taking a mark, the umpire will blow the whistle to signify the mark and a player is entitled to an unimpeded kick of the ball. The nearest opposition player stands on the spot where the player marked the ball, which is also known as 'the mark' and they become 'the man on the mark.' When awarded the free kick, the player can choose to forego their kick to play-on and run into space, with the defending players then allowed to tackle as normal. The player has 10 seconds to move the ball on after a mark unless they are taking a shot on goal in which case they have 30 seconds to take their kick. If the player takes too long to complete their free kick, the umpire will call play-on, rescinding the award of the free kick, which also allows the defenders to tackle as normal.

A mark must be caught cleanly, with the player having complete control of the ball, even if only for a short time. As such, if the ball is punched out from between the player's hands after it is caught, or the ball is dislodged upon hitting the ground, a mark is still paid, even if the ball was held for only an instant.

Although the rules make no provision for two players marking the ball simultaneously, by convention the umpire will award the mark to the man in front, i.e. the player who has the front position in the marking contest. If the umpire cannot determine which player is in front, then a ball-up will result.

The mark has been included in the compromise rules used in the International Rules Football series between teams from Australia and Ireland since 1984.

=== Minimum distance requirement ===
The current minimum distance the ball must travel for a mark to be awarded is 15 metres in any direction; a cleanly caught ball which travels a shorter distance is called 'play on'. This has been the case since 2002; for more than a century before that, the minimum distance was ten metres or ten yards. There are very few ground markings on an Australian rules football field which could be used to measure this distance precisely, leaving the decision on distance up to the best judgement of the umpire; a kick which is too short will typically be met with shouts of 'play on' or 'not fifteen' by the umpire.

The first set of 10 rules for the game were written by the Melbourne FC in 1859; these rules did not include a specific kick distance for a mark, and the player who caught the kick was responsible for calling out "mark", as umpires were not yet included in the game. In the early decades of Australian rules football, the minimum distance was substantially shorter, resulting in a type of play called a "little mark", in which a team could earn a mark by kicking the ball a short distance into the hands of a team-mate standing almost immediately adjacent. Little marks were polarising: they were considered by supporters as one of the game's best features and an effective way for teams to clear scrimmages; and considered by detractors as too difficult to accurately adjudicate and sometimes exploited by crafty players who would disguise a hand-off as a little mark. The minimum distance for a mark changed many times over the early years: until 1877, no minimum; in 1877, 6 yards (5.5 m); in 1886, 5 yards (4.6 m); in 1887, 2 yards (1.8 m), though, by the start of the 1890s, it was reported that most umpires would pay little marks for as little as a few inches. The little mark was abolished in 1897, with the introduction of the 10 yards (9.1 m) minimum distance.

=== Standing the mark ===
Only one player may stand the mark; this restriction was introduced in 1924. Since 2021, a player standing the mark must remain stationary upon taking up the mark until the kicker has disposed of the ball or played on; prior to this, the man on the mark was free to leave the mark or move laterally, provided they did not move over the mark towards the kicker. Breaking this rule is punishable by a 50-metre penalty. If the team chooses not to put a man on the mark, then players may defend the kick from five metres behind the mark; these players are allowed to move.

There is a protected area around the kicker, which is a corridor which extends ten metres either side of the line between the man on the mark and the kicker, five metres behind the kicker, and five metres behind the mark. Opposing players may not enter the protected area unless following their direct opponent within two metres; and a player who finds themselves within the area needs to make their best endeavours to leave it. Breaking the rule is also punishable by 50-metre penalty.

== Origins of the mark ==
The combination of kick and mark as the primary means for advancing the ball has been a distinctive feature of Australian football ever since the first rules were created in 1859. The original rules of the game, which were published in The Footballer newspaper in 1859, included the phrase "A mark shall be considered to be a clean catch of the ball, on the full, without it touching the ground". This rule was included in the Victorian Football Association's rules in 1866, and was included in the Australian National Football Council's rules in 1897.

Other forms of football descended from English public school football games of the 19th century have featured a fair catch, with similar rules to the mark. It was abolished early in the development of soccer and is only used occasionally in rugby union and American football. The mark was part of the game in Gaelic football in the 1800s and was re-introduced to the game by the GAA in 2017.The fair catch mark is used in the National Rugby League where a fullback or winger takes possession of the ball from an opponent's kick in their own in-goal area.

The origin of the "mark" term has a few possible sources. In rugby and the early days of soccer, a player would shout 'mark' and mark the ground with their foot. The rugby football game described in the 1857 novel Tom Brown's School Days includes a description of the fair catch, where the ball catcher "strikes his heel into the ground, to mark the spot where the ball was caught". It was formerly a requirement in the Australian game to make such a mark but this is no longer the case. Sometimes a cap which formed part of the uniform was used to show where the fair catch was taken.

Another source of the term may have been from the traditional Aboriginal game of Marn Grook, which is said to have influenced founder Tom Wills' development of the early forms of Australian football. It is claimed that in Marn Grook, jumping to catch the ball, called "mumarki", an Aboriginal word meaning "to catch", results in a free kick.

These early influences may be limited in their relevance, as the term "catching the ball" was more commonly used throughout the early 20th century. The term "mark" only became widely used in the 1940s, and used by players and commentators alike by the 1950s.

=== Evolution of the overhead mark ===
Early forms of Australian football were characterised by low, short kicks and scrimmages. Marks were taken on the chest as all other marks were seen as dangerous or risky. One of the first players to attempt an overhead mark and high mark was Jack Kerley in 1883. Jack Worrall popularised the high mark between 1885 and 1887 and others followed, ushering in a new era of overhead marking in the sport. However players who leapt for the ball could be pushed in mid air, risking immediate dispossession, if not injury.

At a meeting of the Australasian Football Council (AFC) in 1890 a motion was passed banning pushing in the back in a marking contest which was agreed to by its member leagues including Victoria. It was adopted by the newly formed VFL in 1897. While the rule encouraged high marking, players marking from behind were still often penalised.

In 1907 the AFC introduced the concept of unintentional interference in a marking contest. Spectacular marks subsequently became more common.

As overhead marking became dominant, speed of delivery overtook the need for perfect passing precision, driving the transition from carefully taken drop kicks and place kicks, to instead the rapid punt and drop punt.

== Types of marks ==
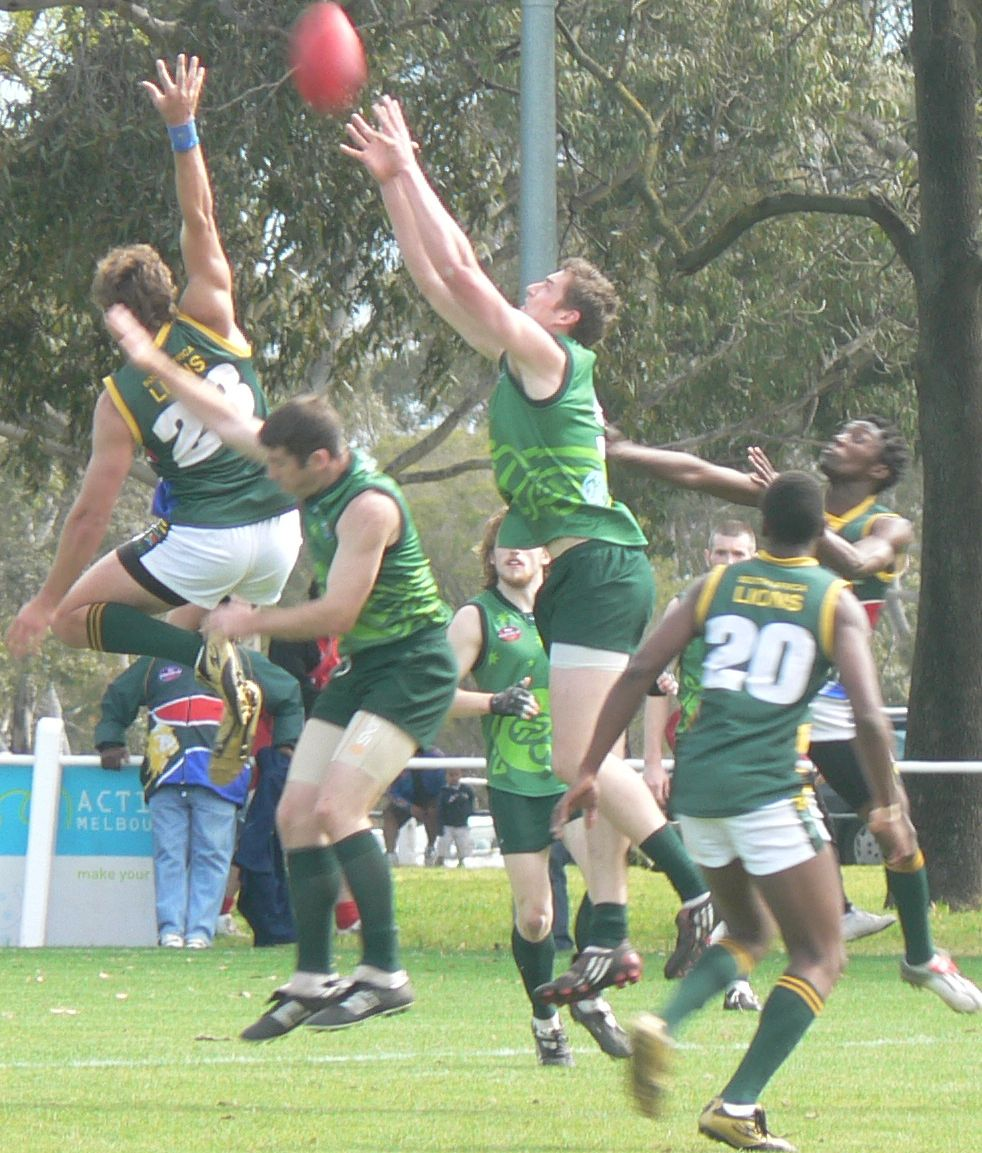
Mike Finn of Ireland attempts a contested pack mark overhead in the 2008 AFL International Cup

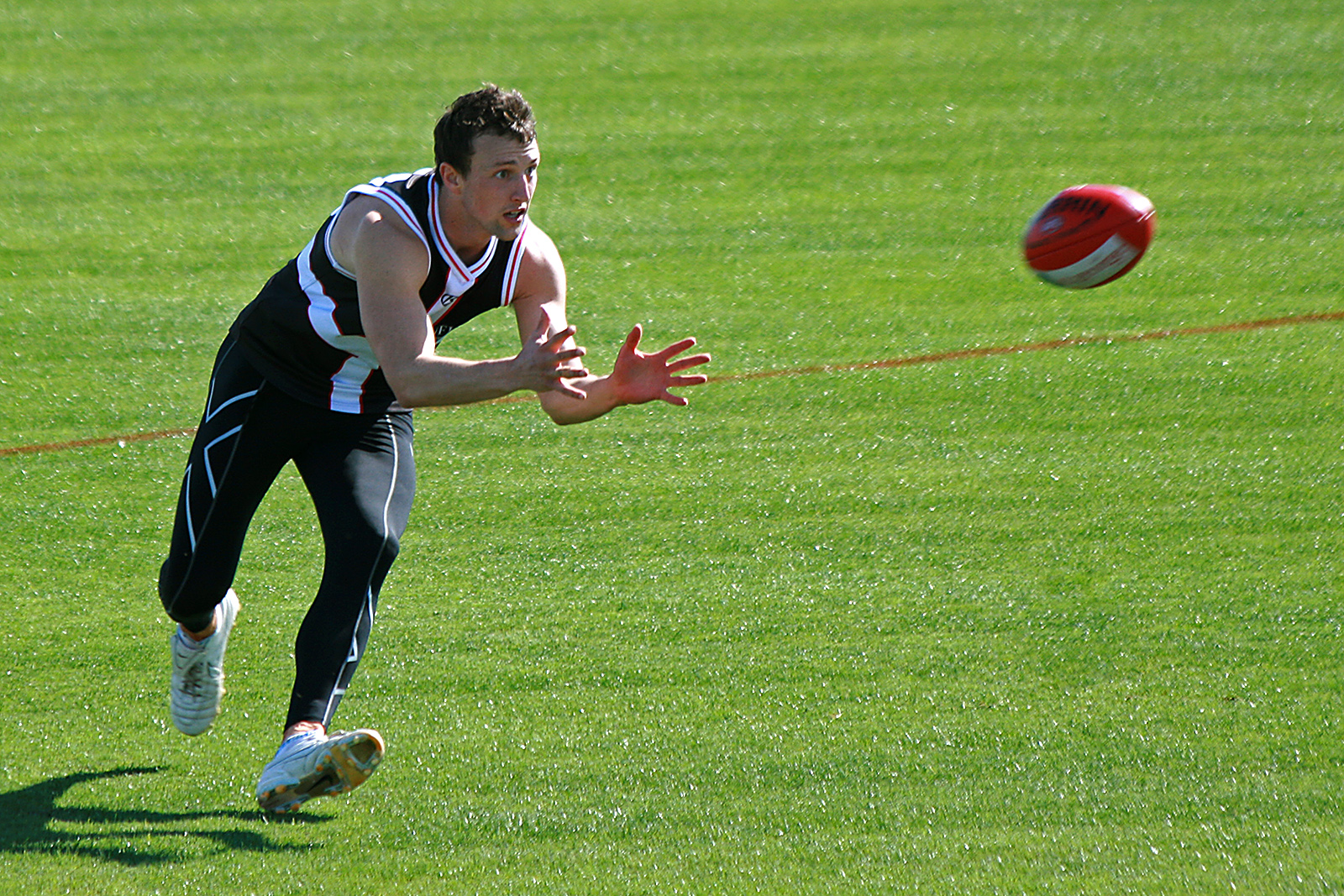
Robert Eddy of St Kilda FC positions himself for the difficult "out in front" mark

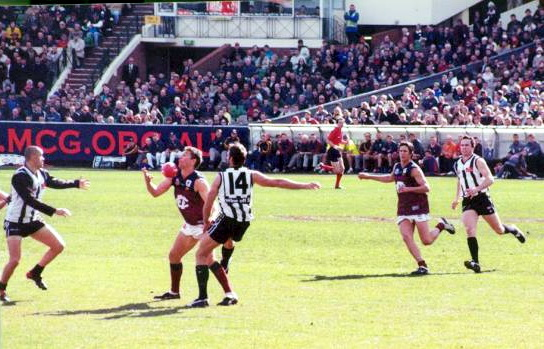
Alastair Lynch of Fitzroy FC attempts a one handed chest mark

In Australian football, marks are often described in combination of the following ways.

- Overhead mark: catching the ball with hands extended above the head
- Contested mark: catching the ball against one or more opponents who are attempting to also mark or spoil the player attempting the mark. This skill is declining in the professional game as coaches prefer to avoid contests.
- Pack mark: catching the ball against one or more opponents and/or teammates all close to the fall of the ball.
- High mark: catching the ball whilst jumping up in the air. Stewart "Buckets" Loewe, Matthew Richardson and Simon Madden are notable exponents of the high mark.
- Spectacular mark: sometimes nicknamed 'specky', 'screamer' or 'hanger', this term is most often used when a mark taken whilst jumping in the air. Additional elevation is achieved by using the legs to spring off the back or shoulders of one or more opponents and/or teammates. The movement of other players beneath the player marking can cause them to lose balance in mid air and land or fall awkwardly, enhancing the spectacle of the mark.
- Chest mark: catching the ball and drawing it in to the chest. This is considered the easiest mark to take, and is often used in wet weather. At professional level this skill is discouraged by coaches due to it giving opponents a much better chance of intercepting the ball from most directions.
- Out in front: catching the ball with arms extended forward from the body. This skill is extremely difficult, particularly with the ball travelling low and at high speeds. At professional level this skill is preferred by coaches, as it gives opponents less chance of spoiling from behind, and if the ball spills, it will be "front and centre" of the player, which makes it much easier for rovers to predict and to execute game strategy.
- One-handed mark: catching the ball with only one hand. Sometimes used in a contested situation where one player's arm is impeded by an opponent, or where the player uses upper body strength to physically fend off their opponent. While spectacular, this skill is discouraged by coaches due to a low percentage of success and is sometimes seen as "showing off" or "lairising".
- Diving mark: leaping horizontally to catch the ball before it hits the ground.
- With the flight of the ball: a mark taken running in the direction that the ball is travelling. In order to do this, the player must take their eyes off opposition players sometimes running at fast pace in the opposite direction. This type of mark is often branded "courageous", because in attempting the mark, the player must ignore the danger of a high speed collision with oncoming players. Wayne Carey and Jonathan Brown were known for their ability to take courageous marks.
- Standing one's ground: a mark taken by a player who is standing still. These are particularly difficult, because the player must wait in a stationary position, making it much easier for moving opponents to make better position. There is also a higher risk of collision with incoming players, meaning it requires courage.
- Backing into a pack: a mark taken by a player who is running or jogging backwards while facing the ball. These are particularly dangerous with an extremely high risk of collision from behind by players running at the ball at high speed. It is also difficult to keep eyes on the ball whilst expecting a high collision from behind.
- Half volley: technically not a mark. Sometimes players catch the ball so close to the ground that it is difficult to tell whether it hit or bounced off the ground. Sometimes a player is awarded a mark by an umpires benefit of the doubt.
- Juggled mark: when a player takes two or more touches of the ball to claim the mark. The player must appear to have had control of the ball to be awarded the mark. Importantly, the mark must be completed within the field of play to be paid as a mark; it should not be paid if the first touch was inside the boundary line, but the last outside.

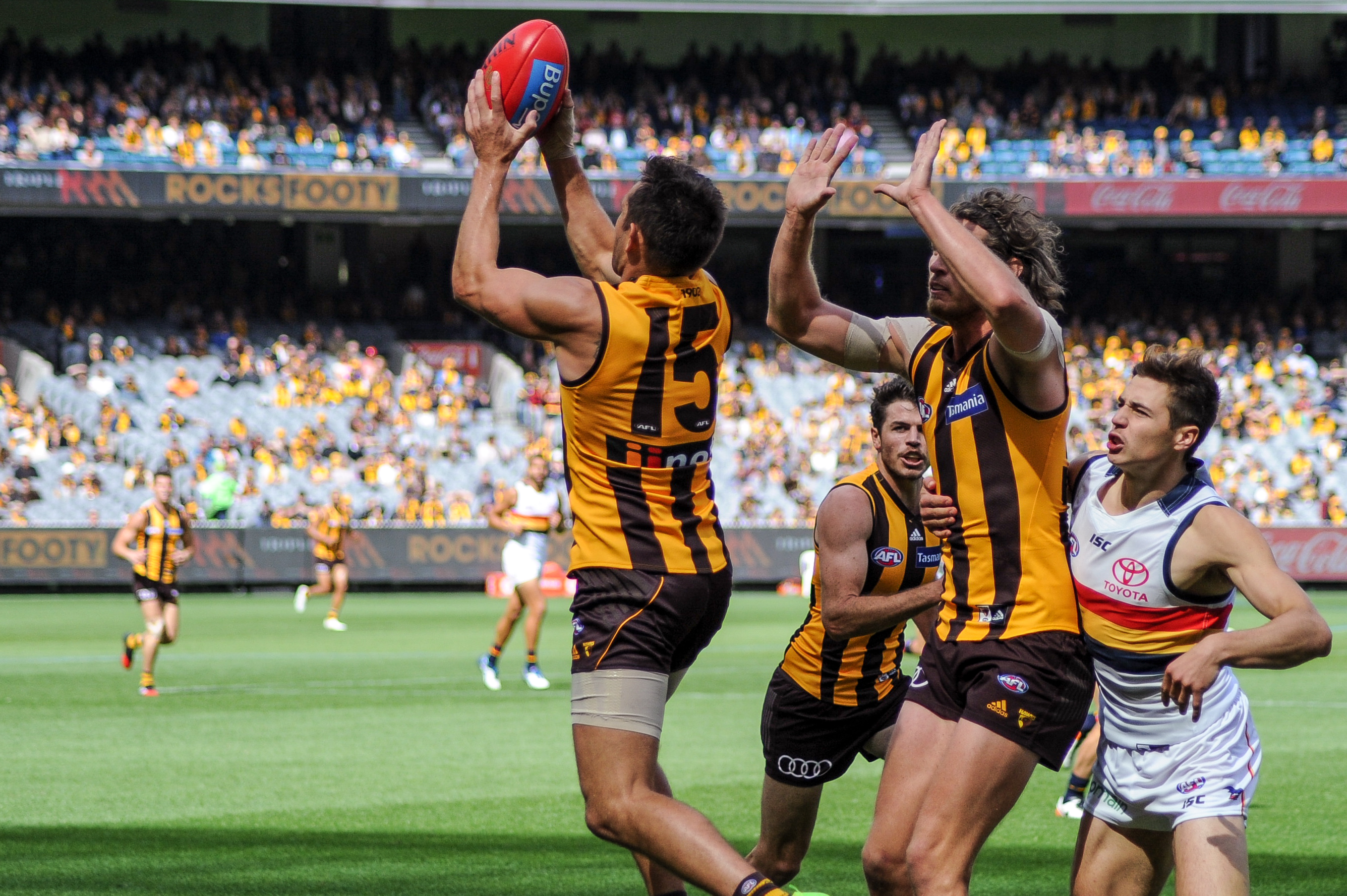
An uncontested overhead mark taken by Luke Hodge in a 2017 AFL game between Hawthorn and Adelaide

- Fingertip mark: when the player is only barely able to hold the ball with their fingers at full stretch. This type of mark carries a high risk of injury to fingers.
- Slips catch: a fingertip mark taken low to the ground, with terminology borrowed directly from cricket.

== Famous marks ==
While the Mark of the Year competition has identified many famous marks, other marks include:

In the 1970 Grand Final before a record crowd of 121,696, Carlton full forward, and giant of the game, Alex Jesaulenko, took one of the most inspirational marks in the history of 'the Australian game.' Leaping high for a specky over Collingwood's Graeme Jenkin just before half time, the mark inspired a Carlton side that was behind by 44 points at the half. It was retroactively classified as the Mark of the Year.

Sydney's Leo Barry leapt into history with his match-saving mark in the final seconds of the 2005 grand final against the West Coast Eagles to seal the game. His contested overhead mark was taken in a congested pack of three teammates and three opposition players.

Shaun Smith's and Gary Ablett's marks share the title of Mark of the Century.

St Kilda/South Melbourne player Roy Cazaly was renowned for his high marks, giving rise to the catchphrase and song "Up There Cazaly".

== Spoiling the mark ==
Spoiling is the technique typically employed by opposition defenders to legally stop a player from catching the ball. It is performed as a punching action by hand or fist just before the opposing player has caught the ball in their hands.

The rules are quite strict on defensive spoiling methods. Players are not allowed to push other players out of marking contests or make forceful front on contact with an opponent in a marking contest, if they are not simultaneously attempting to mark or spoil the ball. Also, no high contact is allowed unless such contact is incidental to attempting to mark or spoil the ball.

=== Taking the arms ===
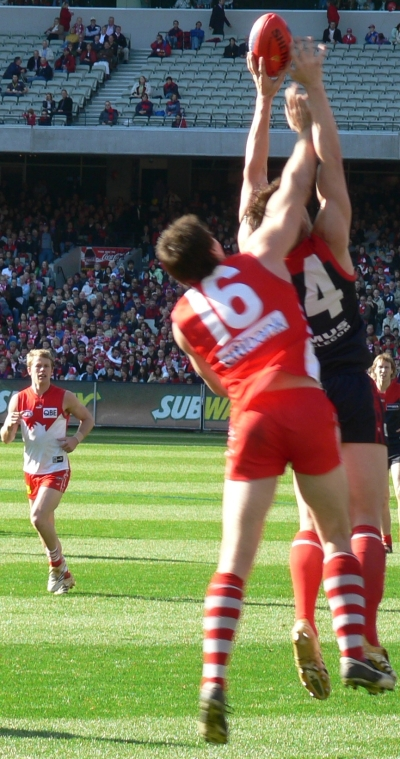
Sydney Swans player appears to chop the right arm of his Melbourne Demons opponent preventing a clean mark

Deliberately taking, hacking or chopping the arms is an infringement committed by players which will result in a free kick.

The arm interference free kick was introduced as a specific free kick in the AFL and its affiliates in 2005, although it was paid as a blocking, striking or holding free kick previously. The free kick was designed predominately to make it easier for forwards to take contested marks by not allowing defending player to punch or pull a marking player's outstretched arms in a marking contest.

The rule was introduced by the AFL amidst on-going calls from fans and commentators to take action against the defensive tactic of flooding. The rule does directly limit the effectiveness of defenders, but the AFL has never stated whether or not flooding was the reason for the change.

== Marking-related injuries ==
Marking can cause injuries to hands and fingers, including hyperextension, joint and tendon damage, dislocation and fractures. Over a long period of time and with re-injury there can be long-term effects such as chronic injury and debilitating arthritis. To overcome these injuries, some players will strap problem fingers together, whole hands, wear splints or gloves.

Some of these injuries require surgery and extended recovery, threatening professional careers. AFL players whose careers were threatened by such injuries include Robert Campbell, Fraser Gehrig, Brett Backwell and Daniel Chick. Some players, such as Backwell and Chick, have opted for amputation of digits in a bid to extend their playing careers and continue to mark the ball.

In 1876 football texts in Melbourne cautioned players not to attempt to take marks by jumping as this was dangerous.

== See also ==
- 12 July 1924
