= Australian football tactics and skills =

There are various individual skills and team tactics that are required to play Australian rules football effectively. These are dictated by tradition and the sport's laws.

== Individual skills and tactics ==
=== Ball handling and general athleticism ===
The most generic skill for a player is ball handling – being familiar with the shape and weight of the football, how to securely grip and hold it, and how to predict its movement on the ground and through the air.

Additionally, there is a strong emphasis on individual athleticism for players. Physical fitness is desirable because play sees few breaks, takes place across a field 150–180 metres long, and has few restrictions on player position on the ground.

=== Possession skills ===
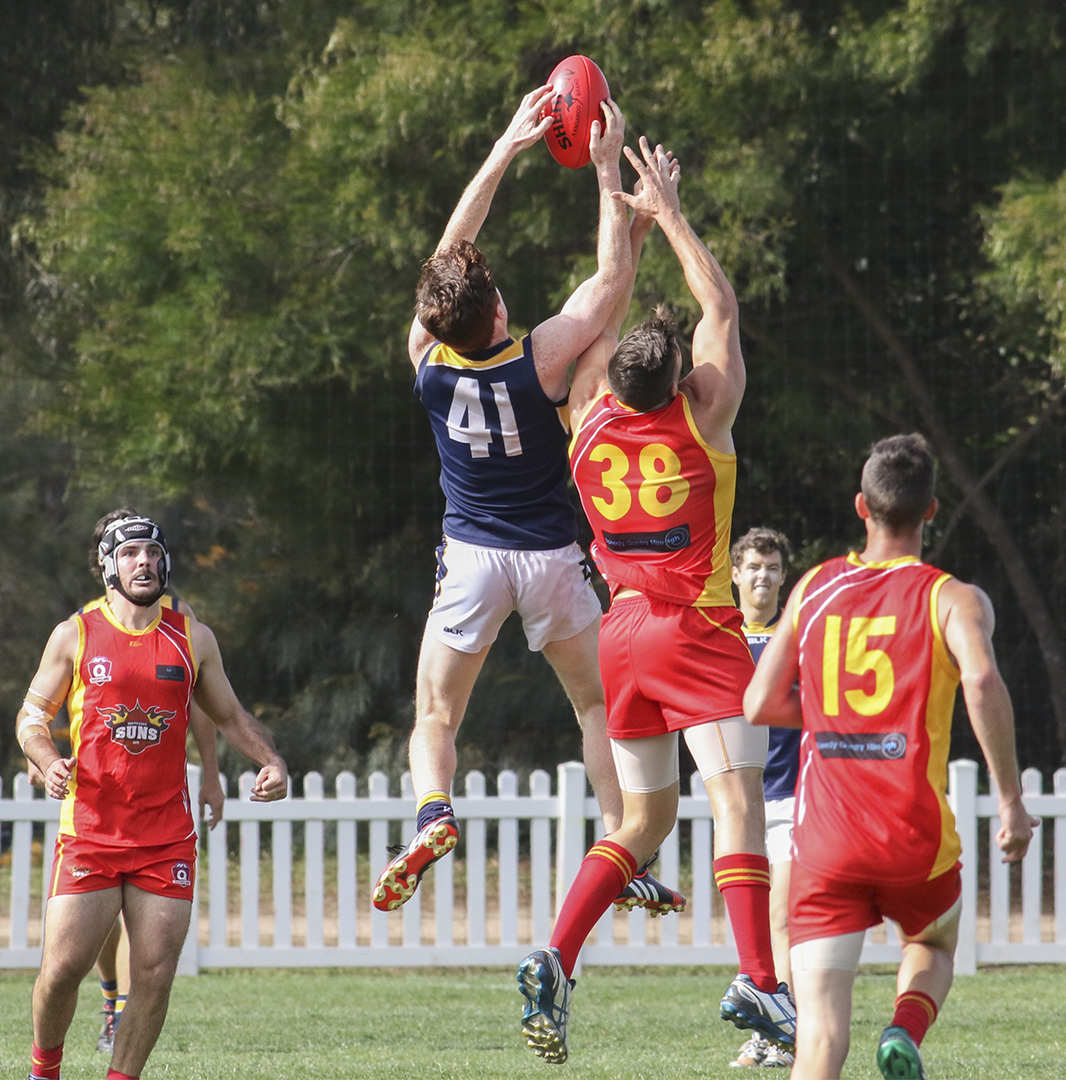
Player takes a contested mark

Possession of the football is required to score so a core group of skills relate to possessing the football. These include:

- Marking – e.g. arm or chest mark, overhead mark, spectacular mark
- Bouncing the ball – e.g. running bounce
- Pick-up – e.g. collecting an unclaimed ball while it is loose on the ground

=== Disposal skills ===
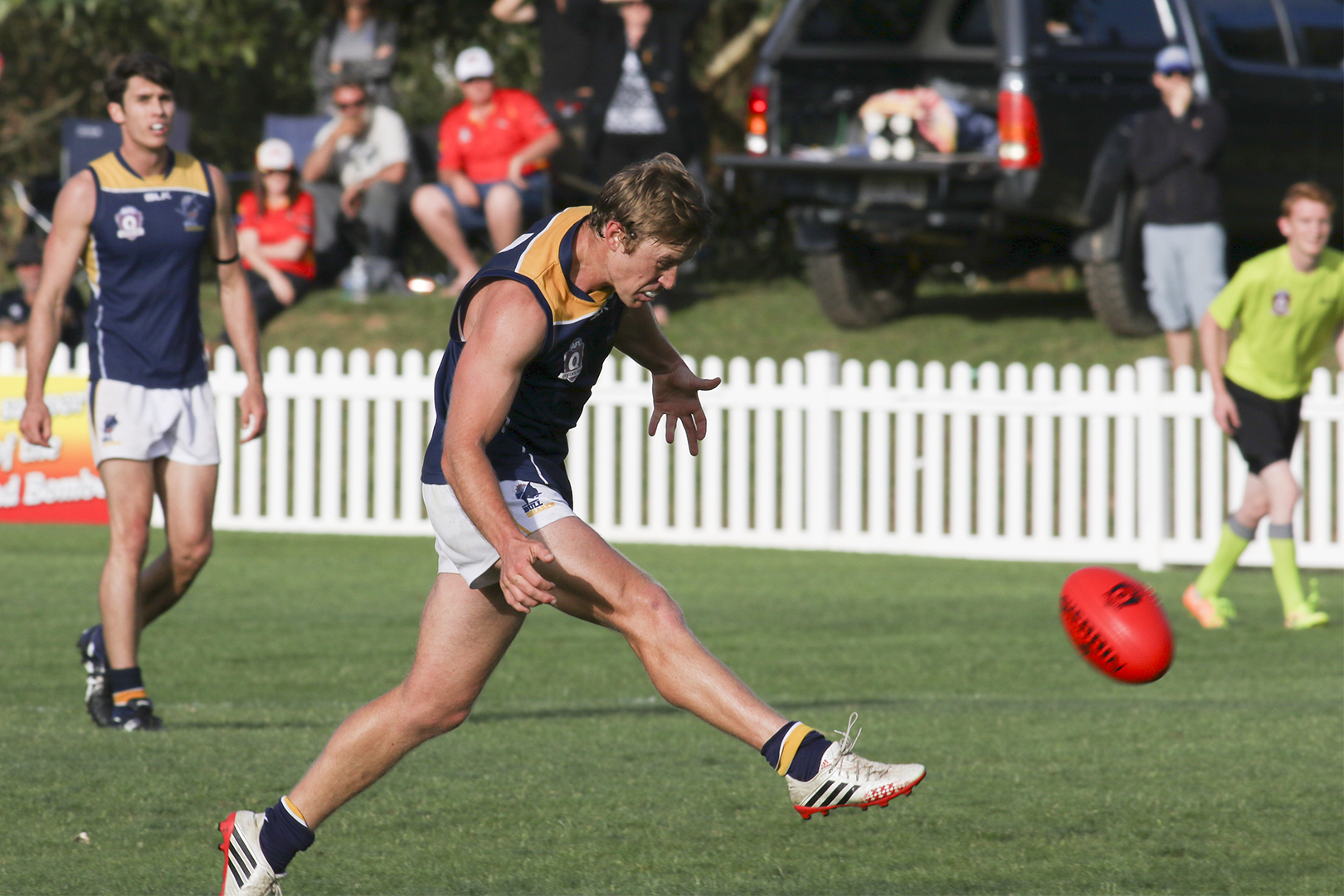
Player kicks a drop punt

In order to progress the football across the field of play in order to gain advantage or score, the football must be disposed of legally by the controlling player. This can be done by:

- Kicking – e.g. drop punt, torpedo punt, snap, banana kick; or
- Handball

In specific situations where a pause in play has occurred (e.g. a stoppage or ball-up from the umpire), the ball may be contested in a specific way:

- Hitting out

=== Checking skills ===
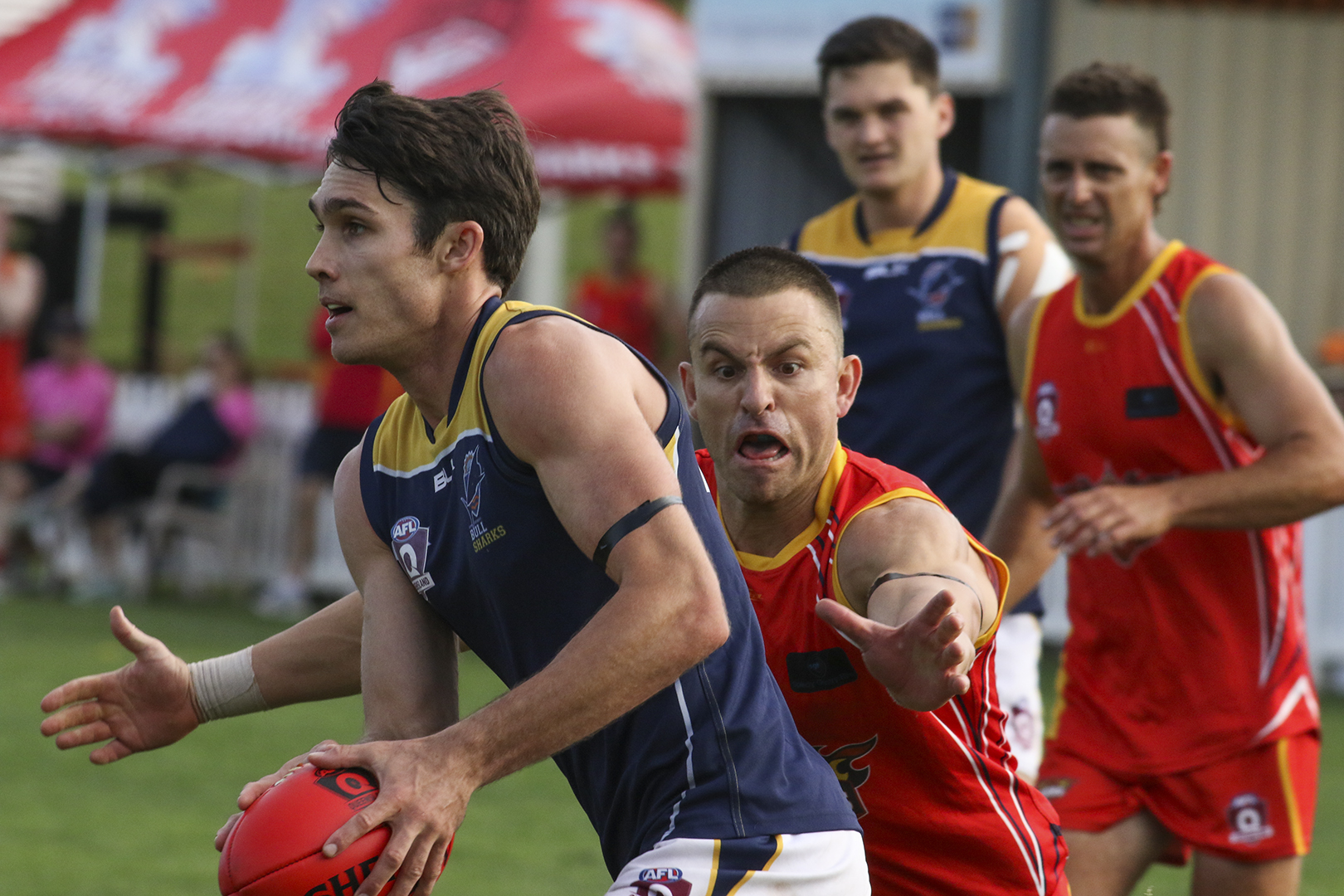
Player prepares to tackle an opponent in possession of the ball

While not in possession of the football, a player will still need to work to gain possession of the football, force an error from the opposing player, or to provide an advantage to a team-mate.

- Smothering
- Tackling
- Bumping
- Spoiling
- Kicking
- Shepherding

=== One percenters ===
These skills get their name from the minor advantage they gain for a team.

- Spoil
- Drawing a free kick
- Intercept marks
- Smother

== Styles of play ==
=== Player-on-player defence ===
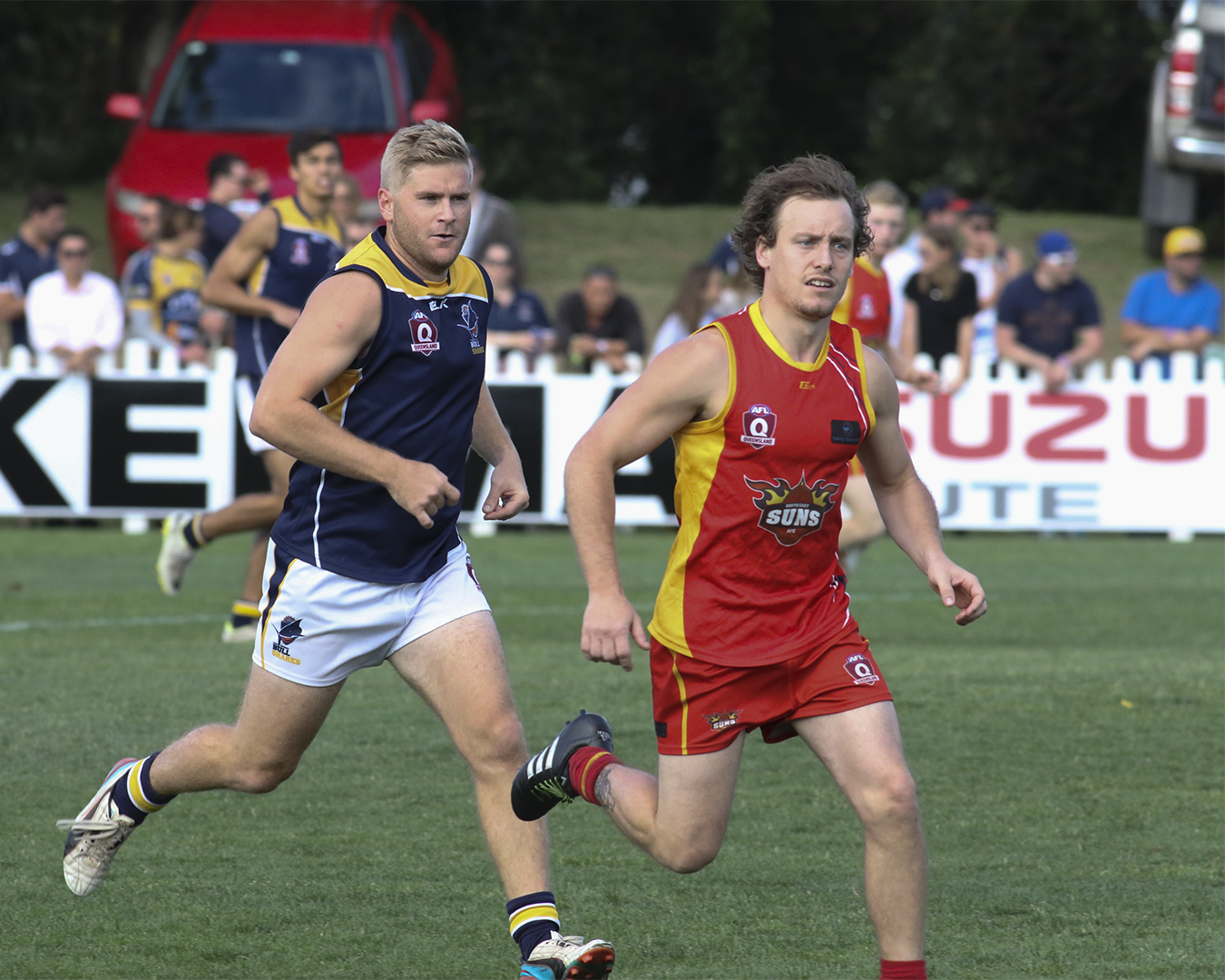
Man-on-man

The player-on-player (sometimes referred to as "man-on-man") defence is a traditional style of play which is commonly used in juniors and grassroots to learn the game, but it is sometimes used professionally as a rigid defensive structure, especially in the late game, or to disrupt play. It involves players starting in designated set positions and playing alongside their opponent for as long as possible. This style of play results in maximum contests and provides very few opportunities for tactics. Coaches sometimes utilise one or more players that specialise in sticking with their opponents to negate their play; this is called "tagging" or "run-with" players.

=== Direct ===
Direct football, often referred to as playing up the guts, contested footy or corridor footy, requires moving the ball on the shortest possible path from goal to goal; i.e., without going to the boundary of the field. This puts the ball into areas crowded with players. Direct football can result in frequent physical contests, and forwards are not always able to mark the ball. As a result, crumbers (small players at the fall of the ball) become more important and are often instructed to run to pick up the loose ball.

In direct football, the role of ruckmen and midfield centre clearances become critical.

=== Possession ===
Modern professional football has seen the advent of possession football, making the game similar to Association football. In Australian football it is often referred to as playing keepings off. The aim of possession football is to avoid kicking the ball to a player under pressure, denying the opposition of opportunities to take possession. A good way to counter this tactic is to use the aforementioned player-on-player defence.

There are generally two ways that teams execute possession football in the modern game: marking short kicks (or longer kicks to an unmanned player) and by handball.

==== Kicking ====
The rules governing catching a kicked ball allow for "possession football". A player who catches the ball (called taking a mark) gets a short time period where they can kick the ball without being tackled or interfered with. Teams will sometimes kick backwards to allow a teammate to take a mark. This typically prevents the team losing possession. The AFL has experimented with rules in the NAB Cup to prevent this anti-competitive play.

==== Handball ====
Although the rules have allowed for the handball since the Geelong rules were first codified in 1859, most Australian rules leagues viewed handball as a largely secondary skill to the kick. However, by the 1960s, more than a century later, the handball became a far more widely used skill in the modern game. Legendary coach Ron Barassi Jr credited Len Smith (coach at Fitzroy between 1958 and 1962) as being the first coach to encourage attacking use of handball in Victoria. Inside midfielders are known for often having more handballs than kicks, using it as a powerful means of ball distribution around contests where traffic is heavy. As an example, the Brownlow medallist of 2014, Matt Priddis, had a disposal percentage that consisted of 60.7% handballs over his 240-game career. Former Fremantle ruckman Aaron Sandilands holds the AFL record for the most handballs in a game without a kick, handballing 17 times without a kick against Collingwood in Round 13, 2015.

=== Tempo football ===
The term Tempo football was coined by commentators to describe the tactic of controlling the tempo of the game. Australian rules is a game in which teams can score very quickly and gain a psychological advantage to overwhelm their opponents. When a team looks like getting a run on, opposition sides sometimes play tempo football to deliberately slow down the game and temper momentum. This may include forcing a bounce (either through scrimmages or forcing the ball out of bounds, flooding, or through playing possession football and timewasting). Once in possession, they may then speed up the game with direct or running football. Commentators labelled the Sydney Swans 2005 premiership team masters at tempo football, though they were also widely criticized for it, most notably by then-AFL CEO Andrew Demetriou and commentators Stephen Quartermain, Tim Lane and Robert Walls, following a match against St Kilda early that season.

== Environmental conditions and playing styles ==
=== Kicking with the wind ===
Kicking with the wind is one style of direct play in which the team would use strong winds to advantage. Teams place emphasis on the direction of play and determine defensive strategies and long kicking and run-on football to gain extra distance in attack. Captains that win the coin toss will usually kick with the wind. Strong winds can assist teams in the final quarter of each term when players are tiring, leading to some captains to occasionally elect to kick into the wind, although this is a risky gambit, since winds can change direction over time or have a lessened effect as the game goes on. They can alternatively assist them in the first and third quarters. They can also assist in scoring and provide better opportunities for long-distance after-the-siren attempts during close matches. In some grounds, the wind will swirl, which teams can use to advantage by compensating their kicks for the prevailing wind or tactically attacking or defending along a boundary the ground that the wind favours.

=== Wet-Weather Footy ===
Wet-weather football involves a different style of play in which teams may deliberately kick to contests, as it results in the ball more often going to ground. Teams that play most in wet or cold climates, either light rain in temperate climates (such as Melbourne and Adelaide), and/or heavy rain tropical/subtropical conditions (Brisbane, Darwin), often have an advantage with the slipperiness of the ball and ground. Coaches may instruct players to knock the ball on instead of take possession. Coaches may advise players not to kick or handball short, as the ball may be more easily dropped, fumbled or the player tackled due to reduced foot speed. Wet weather often makes drop punts less effective, and teams with torpedo punt specialists use it to cut through the conditions more easily and gain attacking distance. Coaches may advise players to drop into the square in defence, as the heavy ball drops short of the goal line. Defensively, coaches may advise to cause stoppages as often as possible to lock up the ball and to try to rush behinds or force the ball out of bounds if possible. Wet weather can also help attacking teams to more easily break tackles and run the ball into attack; however, coaches will almost always advise run-and- carry players to touch the ball on the ground rather than bounce in wet conditions. Coaches may advise players to make use of the wet ground to enable the ball to skid and gain extra distance. In the AFL, extreme wet conditions can prevent matches from proceeding; however, grassroots matches have been played in rain, hail and snow—on rare occasions the latter has happened even at AFL level, although this exceedingly rare. A lack of wet conditions can also either advantage or disadvantage professional teams based in covered stadiums such as the Docklands Stadium. If possible, clubs will often tweak their starting line-up with shorter and more agile players to compensate for the conditions.

== Set plays ==
=== Kick-in Tactics ===
After a behind has been scored, a designated kicker must return the ball to play from the goal square. Kick-ins are one of the most strategic set plays in the game of Australian football.

==== 7-point play ====
The term "7-point play" was coined by fans of the Glenelg Football Club in South Australia and was subsequently picked up by broadcast commentators to describe the situation where a team has been able to convert a missed goal (behind) into 7 points by stealing the ball directly from a kick-in and scoring a goal.

==== Zone ====
The zone defence at kick ins was popularised by Kevin Sheedy and brought from basketball. The opposition forwards will disperse approximately 20 metres apart in the defensive 50-metre arc.

The main methods were used to penetrate the zone:

- Long kicking (such as the torpedo punt), typically with the target being a ruckman or other tall player
- Short kicking (typically to a fast running back pocket player), although this can be risky as it is closer to goal
- Full-back play-on – this requires the fullback to perform a solo move to leave the goal square and run on, gaining enough distance to break the zone

==== Cluster ====
The cluster involves players from the team kicking the ball in congregating at the top of the 50-metre arc and breaking in different directions. The player kicking in will typically have a designated spot or target player to kick to. The opposition team will often resort to a zone defence to successfully counter this tactic, and hence it is rarely used, although it's a common strategy at junior levels.

=== Bounces and throw-in Tactics ===
Bounces and throw-ins are critical set plays in Australian football, and the rucks and midfielders will often use these opportunities to execute specific set-play strategies.

== Defensive tactics ==
=== Rushed behinds ===
A strategy for defenders was to deliberately concede a point (behind) to regain possession of the ball. Some spectacular examples of this include Mal Michael's controversial "own goal" from 30 metres. Under coach Alastair Clarkson, Hawthorn used this tactic in the 2008 AFL Grand Final, conceding 11 rushed behinds. It caused the AFL to review the laws and award a free kick for deliberate rushed behinds where there is "no pressure".

=== Flooding ===
Flooding exploits the freedom of movement of players around the ground. It involves the coach releasing players in the forward line from their set positions and directing them to the opposition forward area, congesting the area and making it more difficult for the opposition to score. It is commonly deployed to protect a lead, or prevent a rout. This is possible due to the lack of an offside rule or similar restrictions on players field movements. In 2000, it was infamously employed by the Western Bulldogs to end Essendon's 20-game winning streak.

=== Rolling zone ===
The rolling zone or cluster, pioneered by Hawthorn coach Alastair Clarkson executes the zone defence, but across the entire field. Such a tactic requires extreme fitness and co-ordination of the entire team.

Teams can break the rolling zone by playing direct football, or kicking long to a contest.

== Attacking tactics ==
=== Primary target ===
Before the 1980s, teams would often simply kick high to a full forward whose role was to kick goals.

Allan Jeans used Jason Dunstall as a lead up full forward and established a new breed of lead up full forward who would lead up the ground in a straight line, providing midfielders with a large, fast and strong running target to kick to. This made it very difficult for opposition sides and lead up full forwards would provide game winning firepower. Such players included Tony Lockett, Gary Ablett and Tony Modra.

In response to the lead up full forward, opposition teams will often double team a full forward and stand "in the hole" (often tall ruckmen) to prevent them from leading into open space.

In response, coaches began recruiting specialist decoy forward or secondary target who were able to run in a different direction to the primary target and were accurate at set shots.

More recently, flooding and other defensive tactics have denied opportunities for using both the primary and secondary target tactics.

=== Forward play ===
==== Pagan's paddock ====
North Melbourne coach Denis Pagan pioneered a technique called Pagan's Paddock, which involves ordering all attacking players to clear the attacking 50 metres of players and bombing the ball into the open space. This would give key forwards (in his case specifically Wayne Carey) room to run into, often running with the flight of the ball toward goal. In recent times, a similar tactic for the Sydney Swans' Lance Franklin has been described as Buddy's box.

==== Rotating forwards ====
Rotating forwards is a tactic where coaches move and change forward players to exploit different match ups create space to lead diagonally when the ball is inside the 50 metre arc.

==== Forward pressure ====
Historically forwards were "stay at home" players, lacked endurance and would not run and chase. This allowed defenders to run out and set up long attacking players.

This has changed significantly and modern forwards are expected to chase down and tackle defenders and in fact steal goals. Leigh Matthews' triple-premiership-winning Brisbane Lions (which had superstar players such as Jason Akermanis) excelled at applying forward pressure on opposition teams. These days, shorter, faster forwards such as Aaron Davey are becoming increasingly popular for applying forward pressure, and they are credited with revolutionising the attacking game.

=== Running in waves ===
Hawthorn's dominant 1980s team used the tactic of running in waves using multiple handballs to draw the man, move the ball down the field and open holes in the attack in a similar way to rugby. In recent years, the tactic has been revitalised by the Geelong Football Club.

== Intimidation and attrition tactics ==
A controversial tactic Australian football is using attrition, violence and intimidation in an attempt to win matches.

=== Attrition ===
The aim is often to physically wear down the opposition or to deliberately "take out" a key player. Historically, this tactic is called "playing the man" (as opposed to playing the ball). The attrition tactic has been used to reduce teams to less than 18 fit players on the field, resulting in the offending side having the advantage of extra players.

The 1945 VFL Grand Final was dubbed "The Bloodbath" Grand Final due to the violence resulting in sixteen reportable offences.

During the 1980s, attrition tactics became a popular tactic.

The 1989 VFL Grand Final (informally dubbed "The Battle of '89") is probably the most famous of all matches of attrition football, where two physically dominant and aggressive teams lined up against each other. At the start of the match, an attack occurred on Dermott Brereton with the intention of taking him out of the game. This set the tone for a match in which several key players were hospitalised, including Brownlow medalists John Platten and Robert Dipierdomenico (in an incident involving Geelong's Gary Ablett).

=== Unsociable football ===
While the rules are more strict in the modern game (in the AFL there are now strict fines for melees, for example), some teams still engage in "unsociable football". Targeting the bodies of other players, "professional free kicks" would often be conceded and sometimes even suspensions. Even playing strictly within the rules, tackles can be extremely vigorous and injury-causing, and occasionally teams appear to have a tactic of directing the strongest tackles towards a particular opposition player.

In a match during the 2005 AFL season, an incident of unsociable football was accused of bringing the game into disrepute when an injured Nick Riewoldt was targeted by two Brisbane Lions players. Riewoldt had broken his collar bone; and, while he grimaced in pain, he was subsequently aggressively bumped by the Brisbane's Chris Scott and Mal Michael before he left the ground.

=== Sledging and Taunting ===
Without an offside rule and due to large open spaces, players spend a lot of time on the field next to, or running with, their opponents (termed "manning up"), often long distances from umpires. Players often attempt to put off kickers when standing on the mark. This gives opportunities for the psychological intimidation tactic of "sledging", or verbal abuse or intimidating opponents with body language equivalent to bullying. While vilification codes for sledging have been introduced in recent years with large penalties, including distance penalties for players standing on the mark, this tactic has been widely used since the game's early days and can lead to teams responding and large melees ensuing as players defend their teammates en masse. Players like Mark Jackson, aka "The Clown Prince", were known to employ a large repertoire of showman tactics to upset and put the opposition off their game.
