= Laws of Australian rules football =

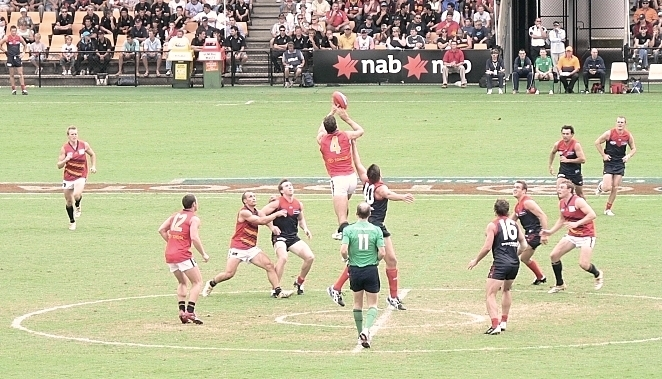
A ruck contest in after the centre bounce. The man in the green shirt is a field umpire.

The laws of Australian rules football were first defined by the Melbourne Football Club in 1859 and have been amended over the years as Australian rules football evolved into its modern form. The Australian Football Council (AFC) was formed in 1905 and became responsible for the laws, although individual leagues retained a wide discretion to vary them. Following the restructure of the Victorian Football League (VFL) as a national competition and the League's renaming to be the Australian Football League (AFL), since 1994, the rules for the game have been maintained by the AFL through its Commission and its Competition Committee.

Australian rules football is a contact sport played between two teams of eighteen players on an oval-shaped field, often a modified cricket ground. Points are scored by kicking the oval-shaped ball between goal posts (worth six points) or between behind posts (worth one point).

During general play, players may position themselves anywhere on the field and use any part of their bodies to move the ball. The primary methods are kicking, handballing and running with the ball. If a player marks the ball (catches it from a long enough kick), they are awarded possession and allowed a free kick. There are rules on how the ball can be handled, including rules against running too far with the ball, throwing the ball and holding the ball. Players can tackle using their hands or use their whole body to obstruct opponents. Dangerous physical contact (such as pushing an opponent in the back), interference when marking, and deliberately slowing the play are discouraged with free kicks, distance penalties or suspension for a certain number of matches, depending on the seriousness of the infringement.

== History of the laws and law setting bodies ==
=== Melbourne Rules of 1859 ===
These ten rules, instituted by the Melbourne Football Club, were originally known as "The rules of the Melbourne Football Club – May 1859." The original rules were widely published and distributed by James Thompson in the 1859 edition of The Victorian Cricketer's Guide as the "Laws of the Melbourne Football Club as played at Richmond Paddock 1859".

1. The distance between the Goals and the Goal Posts shall be decided upon by the Captains of the sides playing.
2. The Captains on each side shall toss for choice of Goal; the side losing the toss has the kick off from the centre point between the Goals
3. A Goal must be kicked fairly between the posts, without touching either of them, or a portion of the person of any player on either side.
4. The game shall be played within a space of not more than 200 yards [180 m] wide, the same to be measured equally on each side of a line drawn through the centres of the two Goals; and two posts to be called the "kick off posts" shall be erected at a distance of 20 yards [18 m] on each side of the Goal posts at both ends, and in a straight line with them.
5. In case the ball is kicked "behind" Goal, any one of the side behind whose Goal it is kicked may bring it 20 yards [18 m] in front of any portion of the space between the "kick off" posts, and shall kick it as nearly as possible in line with the opposite Goal.
6. Any player catching the ball "directly" from the foot may call "mark". He then has a free kick; no player from the opposite side being allowed to come "inside" the spot marked.
7. Tripping and pushing are both allowed (but no hacking) when any player is in rapid motion or in possession of the ball, except in the case provided for in Rule 6.
8. The ball may be taken in hand "only" when caught from the foot, or on the hop. In "no case" shall it be "lifted" from the ground.
9. When a ball goes out of bounds (the same being indicated by a row of posts) it shall be brought back to the point where it crossed the boundary-line, and thrown in at right angles with that line.
10. The ball, while in play, may under no circumstances be thrown.

The rules had no restrictions on players running with the ball, nor did they set a minimum distance for a kick to secure a mark. Although not explicitly mentioned in the rules, each captain was to umpire the game, and each team consisted of 20 per side. In the early days there were no set rules to decide the winner of a game, however it was most commonly the first side to kick two goals. In some circumstances this meant that games could draw out for long periods of time.

=== The Victorian Football Rules of 1860 ===
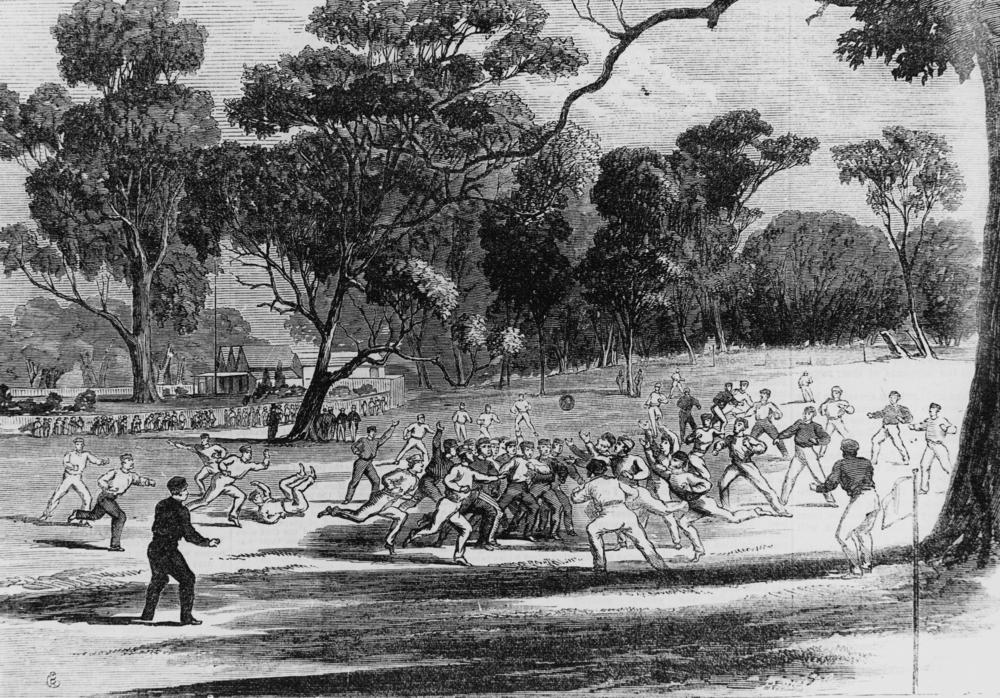
A game at the Richmond Paddock in the 1860s. A pavilion at the MCG is on the left in the background. (A wood engraving made by Robert Bruce on 27 July 1866.)

The first significant redrafting of the rules occurred in 1860 after St Kilda FC called for a meeting of all clubs to develop rules all games are played under. A meeting, facilitated by Melbourne FC was held by players at the Argus Hotel on 28 May 1860. Clubs represented were: Melbourne, St. Kilda, South Yarra, Richmond, Scotch College, University, Williamstown, Collingwood, and Boroondara. The current Melbourne rules were debated, there was an unsuccessful motion by South Yarra for a "push in the back rule". The rules adopted were printed and called "The Victorian Football Rules" which included all but one of the Melbourne rules. Geelong Football Club who could not attend the meeting was sent a copy of the rules for their approval.

The 1860 rules were widely published and were included (along with those of Rugby and Eton) in J. B. Thompson's widely distributed The Victorian Cricketer's Guide as "The Victorian Football Rules". The first competition, the Challenge Cup stipulated that all competing clubs must adhere to these rules.

The following changes were made:

- Rule 3: Added the provision "In case of the ball being forced between the goal posts in a scrimmage, a goal shall be awarded." (This rule appears to originate from the Geelong Football Club's 1859 rules.)
- Rule 7: Added that "'Pushing with the body' is allowed but do not push when opposition has possession of the ball."
- Rule 8: Added that "It shall not be run with in any case."

The most significant change was the provision for captains and umpiring in the newly added Rule 11: "In case of a deliberate infringement of any of the above rules, by either side, the captain of the opposite side may claim that any one of his party may have a free kick from the place where the breach of the rules was made; the two captains in all cases, save where umpires are appointed, to be the sole judges of 'infringements'."

In practice, Rule 8 was rarely enforced, umpires would commonly allow players to carry the ball a sufficient distance for which to execute an effective kick. Disputes involving this interpretation led to trials of the running bounce in 1862 and its eventual incorporation into the rules.

=== Victorian Rules of 1866 ===
Henry C. Harrison's committee redrafted the laws of the game in 1866 at the Freemasons' Hotel in Melbourne, on Tuesday, 8 May 1866. The committee consisted of Henry Harrison and Richard Wilson Wardill (of the Melbourne Football Club), George O'Mullane and Hugh Murray (of the South Yarra Football Club), J.E. Clarke and Chadwick (of the Royal Park Football Club) and Ben James (of the Carlton Football Club). The twelve new laws that were widely published in early May were:

1. The distance between the goals shall not be more than 200 yards; and the width of playing place, to be measured equally on each side of a line drawn through the centre of the goals, not more than 150 yards. The goal-posts shall be seven yards apart, of unlimited height.

2. The captains on each side shall toss for choice of goal; the side losing the toss, or a goal, has the kick off from the centre point between the goals. After a goal is kicked the sides shall change ends.

3. A goal must be kicked fairly between the posts without touching either of them, or any portion of the person of one of the opposite side. In case of the ball being forced (except with the hands or arms) between the goal-posts in a scrummage a goal shall be awarded.

4. Two posts, to be called the "kick-off" posts, shall be erected at a distance of twenty yards on each side of the goal posts, and in a straight line with them.

5. In case the ball is kicked behind goal, any one of the sides behind whose goal it is kicked may bring it twenty yards in front of any portion of the space between the "kick-off" posts, and shall kick it towards the opposite goal.

6. Any player catching the ball directly from the foot or leg may call "mark;" he then has a free kick from any spot in a line with his mark and the centre of his opponents goal-posts; no player being allowed to come inside the spot marked, or within five yards in any other direction.

7. Tripping and hacking are strictly prohibited. Pushing with the hands or body is allowed; when any player is in rapid motion. Holding is only allowed while a player has the ball in hand, except in the case provided in rule 6.

8. The ball may be taken in hand at any time, but not carried further than is necessary for a kick; and no player shall run with the ball unless he strikes it against the ground in every five or six yards.

9. When a ball goes out of bounds (the same being indicated by a row of posts) it shall be brought back to the point where it crossed the boundary-line, and thrown in at right angles with that line.

10. The ball while in play may under no circumstances be thrown.

11. In case of deliberate infringement of any of the above rules, the captain of the opposite side may claim that any one of his party may have a free kick from the place where the breach of rule was made.

12. Before the commencement of a match each side shall appoint an umpire, and they shall be the sole judges of goals and breaches of rules. The nearest umpire shall be appealed to in every case of dispute.

The major changes at this time were:

- Players must bounce the ball every 10 or 20 yards [9 or 18 m] when carrying it (part of rule 8 comes directly from the Geelong Football Club's 1859 rules, and the running bounce was added as a compromise between it and Melbourne)
- Games must be officiated by umpires. Not one but two umpires (independent of the players) must control the match. The closest umpire to the play adjudicated all aspects of the game, including scoring and free kicks.
- Time limit established for matches
- Behind posts used for first time

The publishing of the laws prompted the adoption of the code by the first football clubs in the colonies of Queensland (22 May 1866) and New South Wales (26 May 1866).

Though the shape of the ball is not specified in the rules, the game during this time was primarily played with a round ball, unlike the prolate spheroid which was later widely adopted. Tom Wills had advocated for use of the rugby ball during the game's formative years arguing that it was more aerodynamic. The first documented use of a rugby ball was by the Richmond Football Club (1860–1861) (of which Wills was secretary) against the Melbourne Football Club in 1860 however its early use was unpopular and did not become customary until the 1870s.

The laws were subsequently agreed upon by the major clubs playing the sport and widely adopted by several major leagues in Victoria, Queensland, New South Wales and New Zealand and with a slightly modified and played within a rectangular field. The colonies of South Australia and Tasmania would continue to resist adoption of these rules until the late 1870s. At some stage during the early 1870s, possibly 1874, it was also introduced to the South-West region of Ireland to become what is now Gaelic football.

In 1869, a time limit – 100 minutes – was introduced to the game for the first time.

In 1872, the Ball-up was first introduced to the rules; prior to this, a scrimmage would be allowed to continue until the ball was won.

=== Victorian Rules of 1877 ===
A major rewrite occurred in 1877 and it is during this time that state bodies began to govern their own leagues and/or affiliate with Victorian Associations. The first of these was the South Australian Football Association (renamed the SANFL in 1907).

A major inclusion in these laws was the ball-up which was introduced in 1872; prior to this, a scrimmage would be allowed to continue until the ball was won. The rules in 1877 explicitly mandated the use of a "No. 2 size Rugby ball" (a rugby union ball) measuring 26 inches in circumference.

During this time, transfer of official governing body took place after the formation of the Victorian Football Association in 1877, with the laws in Queensland being directly governed by the Victorian Association. Associations in Tasmania, Queensland and New South Wales would also affiliate from 1879 onward.

By around 1884, Tasmanian goal umpires had begun to wave white flags to communicate with each other about the scoring of goals or behinds. This was adopted in the Victorian Rules in 1887. In the same year, the umpire were required to bounce the ball instead of throwing it up in the air.

=== Australasian Rules of 1890 ===
In 1890, delegates from New Zealand were added and the Australasian Football Council was formed to facilitate a growing number of intercolonial matches which at one point also included leagues and teams from New Zealand. Major rule changes during this time were:

- 1891 – Centre bounce at start of quarters and after every goal; Players required to take up set field positions at start of play.
- 1897 – 6 points for a goal, 1 for a behind – previously, only goals counted. Push in the back rule introduced to protect players jumping for the ball. VFA reduced number of players on the field from 20 to 18.
- 1897 – VFL adopts the VFA ball size requirements which mandate use of a "No. 2 size Rugby ball" measuring 26 inches in circumference.
- 1899 – VFL reduced number of players from 20 to 18, a number which remains today.
- 1903 – Boundary umpires appointed at VFL level – two each game. (First appeared in Ballarat and charity games in 1891.)

=== Australian National Football Council, 1927–1994 ===
With the absence of New Zealand delegates, the council reverted to the title "Australian Football". The organisation was rebranded in 1927 and state leagues were encouraged to include "National Football League" in their name. (This continues to be used in the case of the SANFL; the Tasmanian Football League was briefly styled the "TANFL" from the late 1970s to the mid-1980s).

Not all leagues chose to affiliate with the new body, which was seen by some to be increasingly swayed by the increasingly commercial and professional aspect of the sport. The Australian Amateur Football Council was formed in 1933. As a result, many amateur leagues interpret the laws of the game with subtle differences.

Although some leagues adopted the name style, the style "Australian National Football" was not entirely successful. The game had only participation in New South Wales and Queensland and some did not consider it truly national. The name was considered too wordy by some and by 1980, many leagues had dropped the name style and the sport became better known as "Australian Football".

The new body had direct jurisdiction over several state leagues. Rule changes in this era included:

- 1922 – Free kick for forcing ball out of bounds introduced.
- 1930 – One reserve player introduced.
- 1939 – Boundary throw-ins re-introduced. Dropping the ball included in holding the ball.
- 1946 – Number of reserve players increased to two.
- 1969 – Free kick for kicking ball out of bounds on the full.
- 1973 – Establishment of centre square and restrictions on positions at centre bounces.
- 1976 – Second field umpire introduced.

Notable Hall of Fame administrators during this period included:

- H. C. A. Harrison, president 1905 (also granted life membership to the ANFC)
- Thomas Seymour Hill, secretary 1938–1947
- Bruce Andrew, who acted as field director 1949–76 and secretary 1950–76

In the early 1970s, the ANFC changed its name to the National Football League but continued to operate in substantially the same way it had previously. The body worked to introduce a night representative series in 1976 and remodel representative football and interstate carnivals. In 1977, the VFL established a rival competition to the NFL's night series, called the Australian Football Championships (AFC), and by 1980 this competition had replaced the NFL's competition. Through the 1980s, administration of the game increasingly shifted towards Victoria.

- 1977 – State of Origin rules introduced to interstate matches.
- 1978 – Reserve players became interchange players (i.e. replaced players could later return to the game).
- 1986 – 50-metre (55 yd) arc introduced.
- 1988 – 15-metre (16 yd) penalty becomes 50-metre (55 yd) penalty in the VFL. Emergency umpires empowered to report players.

=== AFL control, 1994–present ===
In 1993, three years after the VFL was rebranded as the AFL, the AFL, under its CEO Ross Oakley, pushed for the Australian Football Council to be disbanded. The AFL successfully argued that the council had become less relevant due to its increasingly successful national club competition. A memorandum of understanding was signed which effectively increased the league's power and cut red tape, allowing the AFL to gain control of the Laws of the Game (forming the official AFL Rules Committee).

With control over the laws of the game, the AFL began a rush of new rules, many of which were aimed at cleaning up the game, reducing "thuggery" and making it more attractive to spectators. A player tribunal system was introduced to more effectively deliver penalties. The blood rule was introduced (players must be removed from ground when bleeding, also when having blood on their body/playing uniforms) to protect players from the transmission of blood-borne disease. The sin bin rule was discarded in favour of player reports and the allocation of free kicks against the aggrieved side.

In 1994, the AFL turned its focus to speeding up the game. To do this, the league increased the number of interchange players for their matches from 2 to 3 and increased the number of field umpires in the AFL from 2 to 3.

In 1998, the number of interchange players for AFL matches was increased from 3 to 4 to further speed up the game.

The league began using its pre-season competition as a test-bed for experimental new rules.

In 2003, the AFL forced the dissolution of the International Australian Football Council (formed in 1995) to become world governing body for the sport and in 1994 released its first official International Policy.

In 2005, the 10-metre (11 yd) centre circle was introduced for ruck contests, in response to an increasing number of posterior cruciate ligament injuries among ruckmen.

In 2006, the AFL announced its intention to further speed up the game and reduce stoppages with the aim of enhancing the game as a spectacle, particularly aimed at television audiences. It introduced a time limit for set shots, which was thought by some to be in response to players such as Matthew Lloyd and Brendan Fevola taking up to a minute to prepare for kicking their goals. The AFL made more stringent the interpretation of awarding 50-metre (55 yd) penalties for "scragging" (attempting to deliberately hold play up by grabbing the opposition player after they had taken a mark). Finally, the league made it unnecessary for players to wait for the flag waved after a behind to kick the ball back into play, and introduced a bucket of spare balls behind each goal to avoid the need to wait for the crowd to return the ball.

In 2007, the AFL began introducing rules aimed at attracting more juniors by reducing the forceful contact and aggression in the game. Significant controversy was caused by the introduction of the "hands in the back" rule. Zero tolerance was given for players putting hands on the back of a player in a marking contest. The AFL rules committee argued that this was simply a stricter interpretation of a rule which had been relaxed over the decades. The league also attempted to reduce head injuries by introducing new rules on bumping, including severe penalties for forcible bumping of players from front-on when their head is over the ball.

In 2008, reacting to an incident involving the Sydney Swans playing 19 men on the field, new interchange rules were introduced to supersede the head count. Also, through the AFL Tribunal, it began to outlaw tackles which pinned the arms of a player and drove their head into the ground. Towards the end of the season, the league also increased the number of boundary umpires from two to four.

For the 2026 season, the AFL Commission changed the rules to eliminate the centre bounce and made changes to regulations around player interchanges. They also introduced a wildcard round for 2026, which will see teams placed 10th vs 7th, and 9th vs 8th playoff during the current rest week before finals, like the current VFL format.

== Players, ground and equipment ==
Aussie rules football

The number of players on the field in the early years of game could consist of 20, or possibly more, players. In 1899, the WAFL was the first competition to introduce the rule that a maximum of 18 players were allowed to be on the field. Since that change it has been universally adopted across all leagues that 18 players are permitted to be on the field per team at any one time, with an additional four players on an interchange bench (although this number often varies in exhibition and practice matches). The equipment needed to play the game is minimal. As in other kinds of football, players wear boots with stops (known as "cleats" or "studs" in some regions) in the soles, shorts, and a thick, strong shirt or jumper known as a guernsey, normally sleeveless, although long sleeve jumpers are sometimes worn in very cold weather by some players.

Protective gear is minimal. Most players wear a mouthguard but only a very few wear a helmet, normally a bicycle style helmet with a soft outer covering, and only after medical advice, such as if they have been concussed numerous times. Some players, predominantly ruckmen, wear shin guards. All protective equipment must be approved by the umpires to ensure that it can not injure other players.

The game is played with an ellipsoid ball, on a grassed oval.

=== Field ===
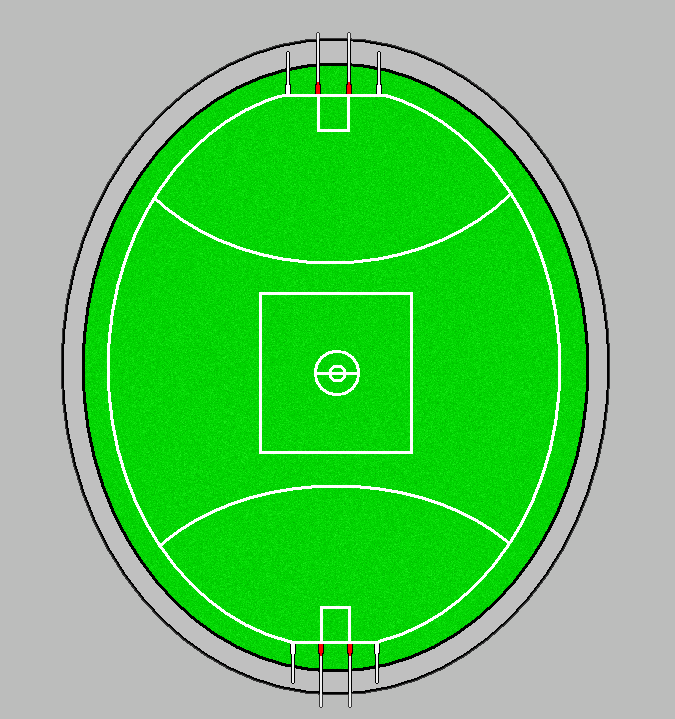
Diagram of a standard ground for Australian rules football

Four posts, aligned in a straight line, 6.4 metres (7 yd) apart from each other (19.2 m or 21 yd in total length), are erected at either end of the oval. The size of the ground is not fixed, but is generally between 135–185 m (148–202 yd) long and 110–155 m (120–170 yd) wide. The main field markings are:

- the boundary line, 5-metre-wide (5.5 yd) from the fence, and curved except for the goal lines
- a 50-metre-wide (55 yd) centre square
- two concentric circles in the centre with diameters 3 m (3.3 yd) and 10 m (11 yd), bisected by one line,
- a 9 m × 6.4 m (10 yd × 7 yd) goal square at each end of the ground,
- an arc at each end, 50 metres (55 yd) from the goal line

== Play ==
The game is a fast-paced combination of speed, athleticism, skill and physical toughness. Players are allowed to tackle the player with the ball and impede opposition players from tackling their teammates (known as shepherding), but not to deliberately strike an opponent (though pushing the margins of these rules is often a substantial part of the game). Like most team sports, tactics are based around trying to get the ball, then – through a combination of running with the ball, hand-passing (punching the ball from the open palm of the other hand) and kicking – to deliver it to a player who is within range of goal. Because taking a mark entitles the player to a free kick, a common tactic is to attempt to kick the ball on the full (without bouncing) to a teammate who is within kicking range of goal. In this situation, packs of players often form around the goal square, and the opportunity arises for a spectacular mark (also known as a specky) in which players launch themselves off opponents' backs to mark the ball, high in the air. This particular skill is highly regarded as a spectacle, and an annual "Mark of the Year" is awarded at the end of a season.

The traditional playing positions.

There are no set positions in the rules of the game, but traditionally the field was divided into three major sections: the forward line, back line, and midfield. The forward and back lines consisted of six players, arranged into two lines of three players each. The midfield generally consists of the designated ruckman (i.e. player who contests the ruck or bounce-down) and players who either stay in the centre area of the ground (between the two 50-metre arcs) or follow the ball and are not confined to a particular area.

The modern game, however, has largely discarded positional play in favour of a free flowing running game and attempting to have loose men in various positions on the ground. The rise in popularity of the hand-pass since the 1970s has greatly influenced this style of play, with players more willing to follow the ball and move it quickly amongst themselves rather than kicking long to a one-on-one marking contest. In the late 1990s a tactic known as flooding was devised and also shifted focus away from set positions. When a team "plays a flood", they direct two or more of their midfield or forward line players into their defence, thus out-numbering their opponent and making it difficult for any opposing forward to take an uncontested mark. Most football sides are named (and demonstrated) in the traditional set positions, but it is in fact uncommon for players to stay within the traditional areas of their position. The players are shuffled on and off the field using the interchange bench, the blood rule means that if any player, for any reason, should begin to bleed, no matter how minor or severe, they must remove themselves from the ground to receive treatment. They may return when the flow of blood has stopped and has been treated by the team medic.

=== Holding the ball ===
Some of the things that cause the most confusion for people that are not familiar with the game are the Holding the Ball, Dropping the Ball, and Throwing rules. Confusion arises because a player being tackled is not allowed to hold onto the ball, but is not allowed to throw it either.

These rules are summarised:

- Players must always dispose of the ball by either a kick or a hand-pass.
  - A hand-pass, also called a handball, is performed by punching the ball from one hand with the other fist. The ball cannot be thrown up (like a volleyball serve) and hit, nor handed to a teammate like an American/Canadian football handoff, nor tossed to a teammate like a lateral in rugby or gridiron football.
- When a player is in possession of the ball, and moving, the ball must be bounced or touched to the ground at least once every 15 metres (16 yd). Failure to do so results in a penalty, where a free kick is awarded to the opposing team. This is sometimes called running too far or travelling, and is signalled by the umpire in the same way as travelling is signalled in basketball. There is no limit to how many bounces or ground touches a player can do, nor a limit to how long a player can hold the ball.
- When a player is in possession of the ball, and is tackled correctly (i.e., held, not just touched, above the knees and below the shoulders), he or she must immediately attempt to dispose of the ball by kicking or hand-passing.
  - If the player is considered by the umpire as having had a prior opportunity to dispose of the ball (such as if the player has run, dodged or fended off an opponent) then a failure to successfully kick or handball results in a holding the ball penalty benefiting the tackling team, which is awarded a free kick. This includes if the ball is knocked free, a kick or handball is attempted but missed, or if the ball is trapped by the tackler.
  - If there was no prior opportunity for the player to dispose of the ball before being tackled, then a free kick is only paid if player with the ball is able to, but does not attempt to dispose of it within a reasonable time. This is also called holding the ball. No free kick is paid if a player without a prior opportunity is tackled, but the ball is unable to be released due to it being held to or under the player by the tackler. A ball-up would result to restart play. If a tackle on a player with no prior opportunity causes the ball to spill free, then "play on" is called and the game continues.

In a recent effort to reduce the amount of unnecessary stoppages, the interpretation of the prior opportunity has widened to include any player who grabs hold of the ball during a ball-up or throw-in situation instead of knocking it away. In this instance, if the player is then tackled and could not dispose of the ball legally, a holding the ball penalty would be paid against him.

== Scoring ==
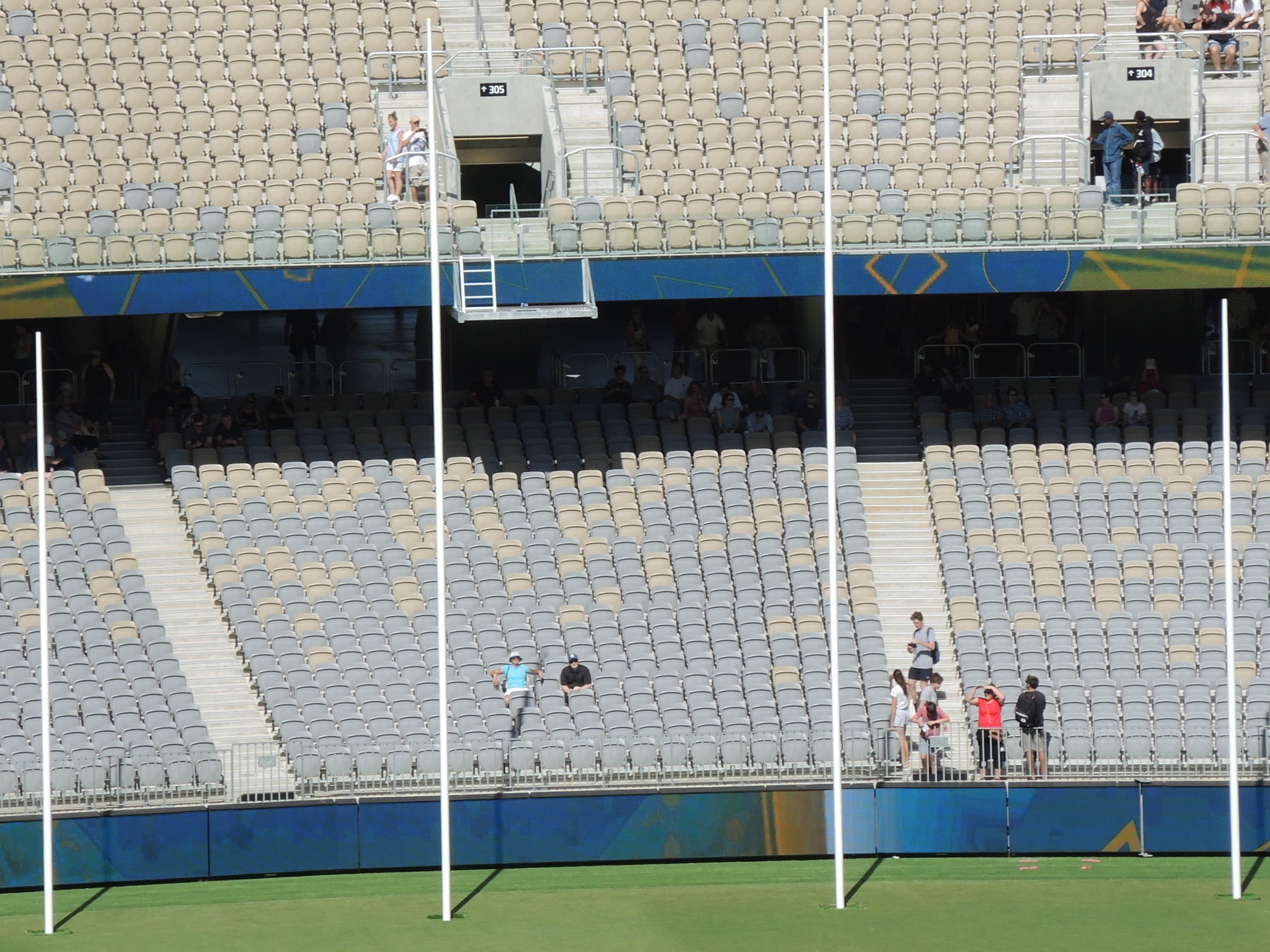
Australian rules football goal posts – the two tall central posts are the goal posts, and the two shorter outer posts are the behind posts.

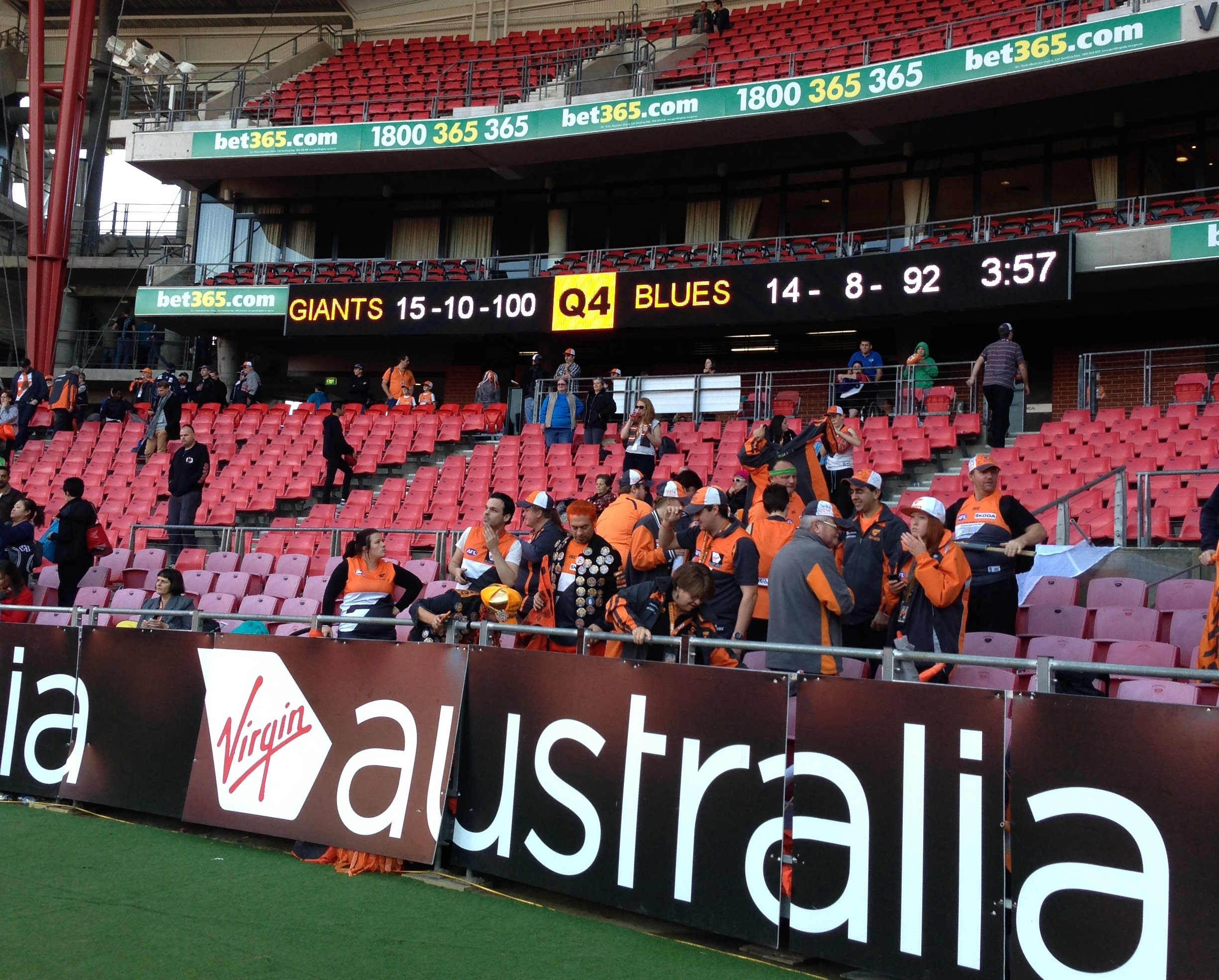
The scoreboard displaying the final score of the match between Greater Western Sydney and Carlton in Round 14 of the 2014 season.

Like many other codes of football, the primary way to score points is to score goals. In Australian football, there are two types of scores: a goal and a behind. There are four posts at each end of the ground, each 6.4m (7yds) apart; the two middle (and taller) posts are the goal posts, and the two outer (and shorter) posts are the behind posts. The area between the goal posts is the goal; the ball must be kicked by an attacking player between these posts, without touching either post and without touching another player, and must completely cross the back edge of the goalline to score a goal, which is worth six points.

The other type of score is a behind, worth one point. This can occur in many ways: by an attacking player kicking the ball between a goal post and a behind post without touching the latter; by the ball hitting a goal post (even if it does not completely cross the goalline) or passing over the top of the goal post; by the ball passing through the goals after touching any part of an attacking player other than the lower leg or foot; or by the ball being kicked, handpassed, carried or forced between the posts by a defending player – the last of these is known as a rushed behind, and can result in a free kick instead of a behind if the umpire deems the player who was rushed it was under insufficient pressure. The term 'behind' derives from the formative years of football, referring to the ball going out of play 'behind goal', rather than 'out of bounds' along the side boundary lines, and these two outcomes triggered different means of restarting play. During these early years, 'behinds' did not score, and it was not until 1897 in Victoria that the modern method of scoring (six points for a goal and one for a behind) was first adopted; prior to this, only the number of goals kicked determined a match result.

If the ball touches an umpire or league official, and the field umpire deems that there would have been score had this not occurred, the field umpire can stop play and award that score. In all other cases a goal umpire judges whether a goal or behind is scored. At the elite level, the goal umpire may also call for a video replay to confirm a score; in these cases, the goal umpire makes an initial soft call, which stands if the video replay is inconclusive.

The goal umpire at the scoring end signals that a goal has been scored by pointing both index fingers forward with bent elbows at waist level; a behind is signalled with one finger. Then, the goal umpire at each end of the ground signals and acknowledges the score to the other by simultaneously waving two white flags for a goal or one for a behind: the goal umpires also serve as official scorekeepers for the game, so this communication ensure that their scorecards are consistent. Goal umpires may officially cancel the most recently recorded score by crossing their flags over their heads.

It is conventional in both spoken and written circles to list the goals, behinds and total when reporting an Australian rules football score. As an example, in a match in which the home team scores 11 goals and 12 behinds, totalling 78 points, and the away team scores 8 goals and 8 behinds, totalling 56 points, the result would usually appear like this:

Home Team 11.12 (78) def. Away Team 8.8 (56).

The exact convention for punctuation can vary. When spoken, the above result would be reported as:

Home Team, eleven twelve seventy-eight, defeated Away Team eight eight fifty-six.

The final result of a match is determined only by the total score: a team may win the game despite scoring fewer goals (e.g. 13.21 (99) def. 14.9 (93)); and, if two teams finish with the same total score, the match is considered a draw even if the teams kick a different number of goals (e.g. 12.10 (82) drew 11.16 (82)).

Some experimental rule changes in the Australian Football League pre-season competition relate to scoring.

== Restart ==
After a goal, the game restarts with another centre bounce. If a behind is scored, the opposing team receives the ball and can kick from inside the goal square. The player also gets to choose whether they will "play on" which can be announced by running out of the goal square.

== Officiation ==
=== Umpires ===
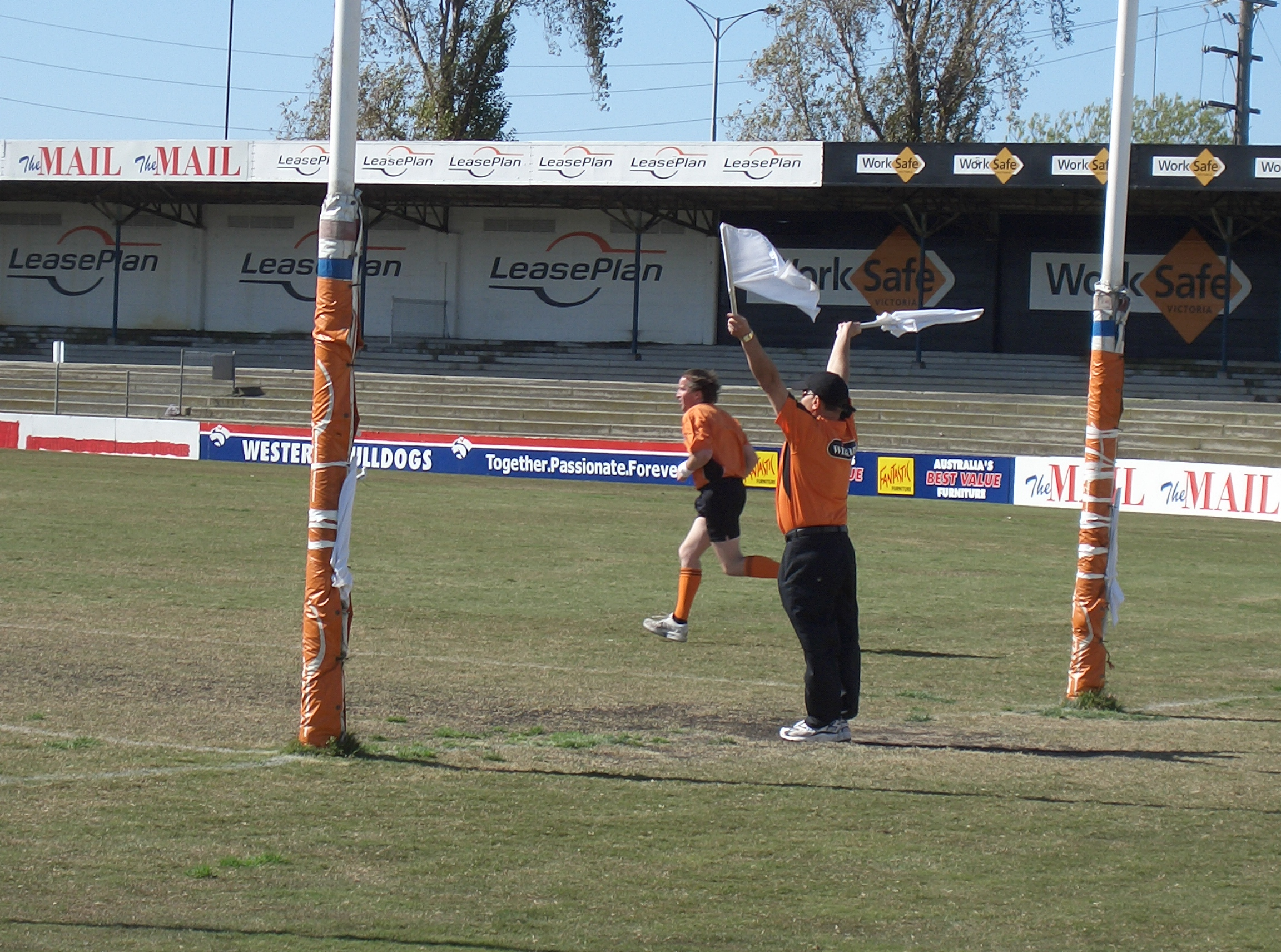
The goal umpire is signalling a goal, while a field umpire makes his way back to the centre square for the centre bounce.

The game is controlled by a number of field umpires (at elite level, four), two boundary umpires (now four at elite level) whose main job is to conduct throw-ins when the ball leaves the field of play and two goal umpires who judge which scores are recorded, and are the official score-keepers of the game. In addition, there are two emergency umpires, one to replace an injured field umpire and one to replace an injured goal umpire. Each of the twelve umpires may report players, but only field umpires may award free kicks.

In addition to these umpires, some leagues, like the AFL, also have a Steward who monitors interchanges and substitutions to ensure they are being conducted properly.

Historically, all umpires have worn white, but most competitions have changed this now to ensure that umpire uniforms do not clash with team uniforms. Historically, the field umpires and boundary umpires have worn white short-sleeved shirts and white shorts, while goal umpires wore a white coat, white broad-brimmed hat and black trousers. Today, goal umpires wear the same short-sleeved shirts as the other umpires and a peaked cap, but retain the black trousers. Goal umpires also have white flags which are waved to signal scores. In the AFL since 2017, umpires can wear either Green, Blue or Dark Grey kits.

=== Tribunal ===
Onfield infractions considered to warrant a more severe penalty than a free kick are handled off-field by a league tribunal. Such incidents include deliberate or reckless acts of violence, such as striking, punching, tripping, kicking or endangering the head of an opponent, as well as misconduct such as abusing umpires or other players. Field umpires, boundary umpires and goal umpires are all permitted to report players for such infractions; in matches where there is video footage and where league rules permit, players may also be reported based on video evidence. For players who are found guilty of reportable offences, tribunals can issue fines or suspend players for a certain number of games.

=== Deregistration ===
Throughout Australia, there is a Player and Official Deregistration Policy, which allows players and officials with a poor tribunal record to be deregistered from playing football for life.

As of 2025, this deregistration is automatically applied to any player or official who, since the age of 16, has been suspended for a cumulative total of 16 matches or more in any suburban, country or state league, or in the AFL, except that for the purpose of the cumulative total, suspensions in the AFL count only 75% of their value. Players may appeal for re-registration, but if successful a further suspension will result in deregistration without the right to any further appeal.

The rule was first established in 2007, and is applied uniformly across all levels of football in Australia.

Deregistration is only practiced in country and suburban football competitions; it is not practiced by the AFL as of 2025, as the deregistration policy was designed for serial aggressive offenders, not low-level repeat offenders. The AFL has not had a serial aggressive offender issue at AFL level for over 30 years.

== Game length ==
In the major professional league AFL, each quarter runs for 20 minutes plus time on – which makes up for time occupied in stoppages, such as when the ball goes out of bounds, injuries, goals (or behinds) being kicked, or when the umpire is setting the angle of a free kick on goal. A typical AFL quarter might run from 27 to 33 minutes, but may be even longer if, for instance, injuries cause delays. AFL breaks after the first and third quarters are 6 minutes, with a 20-minute break at halftime. Thus, a match with quarters averaging 30 minutes would last about two and a half hours.

Time is kept by two off-field officials, known as "timekeepers", who sound the siren at the start and end of each quarter. The quarter or match ends when a field umpire hears the siren, with the exceptions that a score can result from a ball already in flight at the time of the siren, and that a player is allowed to kick for goal after the siren from a mark or free kick which was paid before the siren.

The manner of timekeeping in Australian rules football is unusual compared with other sports, in that the timekeepers keep track of time using a count-down clock which begins at 20 minutes and is stopped during any time-on; but, clocks displayed at the ground count up from zero and are not stopped during time-on. As such, spectators and players present at the ground never know exactly how much time is left in the game. The timekeepers' countdown clock is seen by the coaches and is shown by many television broadcasters.

== AFL Competition Committee ==
The AFL Competition Committee is responsible for management of the Laws of Australian Football. It replaced the Laws of the Game committee in 2018.

The 2023 membership of the Competition committee is:

Name	Role
Andrew Dillon (chair)	Executive General Manager Football Operations, Legal & Integrity
Stephen Coniglio	GWS Giants
Patrick Dangerfield	AFLPA President / Geelong Cats
Chris Davies	General Manager - Football at Port Adelaide Football Club
Chris Fagan	Brisbane Lions senior coach
Simon Garlick	CEO Fremantle Dockers
Andrew Ireland	CEO Sydney Swans
Laura Kane	General Manager Competition Management
Rob Kerr	CEO AFL Umpires Association
Nicole Livingstone	AFLW Head of Football
Josh Mahoney	General Manager - Football at Essendon Football Club
Brett Murphy	General Manager - Player Relations at AFL Players Association
Peggy O'Neal	President of Richmond Tigers
Brett Ratten	Interim head coach at North Melbourne Football Club
Justin Reeves	CEO Hawthorn Hawks
Alan Richardson	General Manager of AFL Football Performance at Melbourne Demons
Kylie Rogers	Executive General Manager Customer and Commercial
Brett Rosebury	President of AFL Umpires Association
Kylie Watson-Wheeler	President of Western Bulldogs
Simone Wilkie	AFL Commissioner

Previous members of the committee have included former VFL/AFL players Kevin Bartlett, Brendon Gale, Andrew McKay, Matthew Pavlich, Luke Darcy, Adrian Anderson, Rowan Sawers, Nathan Buckley and Steve Hocking. Buckley controversially resigned in 2007 due to apparent disagreement with the frequent changes made by the committee, citing that he did not want his name to be associated with the changes.

== See also ==
- Category:Australian rules football terminology
