= Flooding (Australian football) =

Sport tactic

Flooding is a tactic used in the sport of Australian rules football. It involves the coach releasing players in the forward line from their set positions and directing them to the opposition forward area, congesting the area and making it more difficult for the opposition to score. It is commonly deployed to protect a lead, to stop a rout or as a counterattack tactic based on rebounding the ball to an open forward line. This is possible due to the lack of an offside rule or similar restrictions on players field movements.

== History ==
When Australian Football took to the parks around the colony of Victoria in 1858, there were no rules regarding player positions. Even today the rules only declare that a maximum of four per side is allowed in the centre square at the ball-up (ruck, rover, ruck-rover and centre) and 6 must start within each 50m arc, while during general play, all players are free to position themselves as they see fit. In early years this resulted in a pack of players moving with the ball up and down the field trying to get a clearing kick into space that the pack would then run into and repeat the process. Such a process is still evident in some junior leagues (the under 8 years old children) and is known as "beehive football". It was not until 1898 that player positions became regular thanks to Essendon's now famous positions of players around the field. The positioning provided many lopsided contests against teams trying to play pack football, such as beating St Kilda 10.11 (71) to 1.9 (15) on July 23 and Melbourne 11.9 (75) to 2.8 (20) on August 1, 1898. Other teams mimicked the idea and the "lines of three" quickly became, and still is, the norm.

One of the earliest records of flooding comes from an 1860s match between the Geelong Football Club and the Ballarat Football Club in Ballarat. Goalless and kicking against the gale, Geelong captain Tom Wills ordered every player into the backline. The Ballarat fans yelled abuse. Melbourne Football Club later successfully copied the tactic.

In VFL football times, the 1909 VFL Grand Final in which South Melbourne, mindful of a Carlton side which beat them in round 11 after trailing 0.11 to South's 4.4 at half-time, packed the arc in the Grand Final after half time to thwart Carlton's advance. South won the final by two points.

Over the years many teams have put extra men in the defensive 50 metre zone to stifle attacks, usually to stop great full-forwards or protect a lead. It was not uncommon for forwards such as Gordon Coventry, John Coleman, Tony Lockett, Jason Dunstall and Gary Ablett Sr., among others, to be seen fighting off three defenders to take a mark. Flooding the defensive zone outright was a rarity due to the level of endurance required from the entire team. However it was used defensively on occasion to avoid a rout.

== Flooding in modern professional football ==
As football at the elite level increased in professionalism and athleticism, the practice increased.

=== As an offensive tactic ===
Flooding first became an offensive tactic when Rodney Eade became the Sydney Swans head coach in 1996. In order to give star forward Tony Lockett the most room on the small Sydney Cricket Ground he had the team play an extra "line of three" in defence when the opposition had the ball, creating a set-up with 9 defenders, 6 midfielders and three forwards. The idea was to create a forced error and turn-over, followed by swift movement to Lockett who had ample space to lead into. This was similar to Denis Pagan's "Pagan's Paddock" which gave Wayne Carey wide space to manoeuvre in. The Swans used this tactic to great effect in 1996, reaching the Grand Final, and, under Eade's successor Paul Roos, subsequently winning in 2005 despite some early criticism which arose from the tactics backfiring in a match against St Kilda midway through the season.

=== As a defensive tactic ===
Terry Wallace became infamous for the "Super-Flood" that he employed in the Round 21 game between the Western Bulldogs and Essendon at Colonial Stadium in 2000. Wallace successfully quelled the Bombers' scoring power and defeated the team which had won the previous 20 games by playing 14 of the 18 men on the field in the defensive zone for the entirety of the game, and often with all 18 players taking up positions in the 50 metre arc.

In 2002, with a depleted side at his disposal, St Kilda coach Grant Thomas implemented an extraordinary game plan in a match against Sydney which involved flooding the Swans' forward line and continually denying them the ball by kicking towards the boundary line when there were few options forward. The result was an 8.8 (56)–all draw, with Nick Riewoldt winning an AFL Rising Star nomination (and eventually winning the award at season's end) for his breakout performance.

== See also ==
- Australian football tactics and skills
