= Running bounce =

Skill in Australian rules football

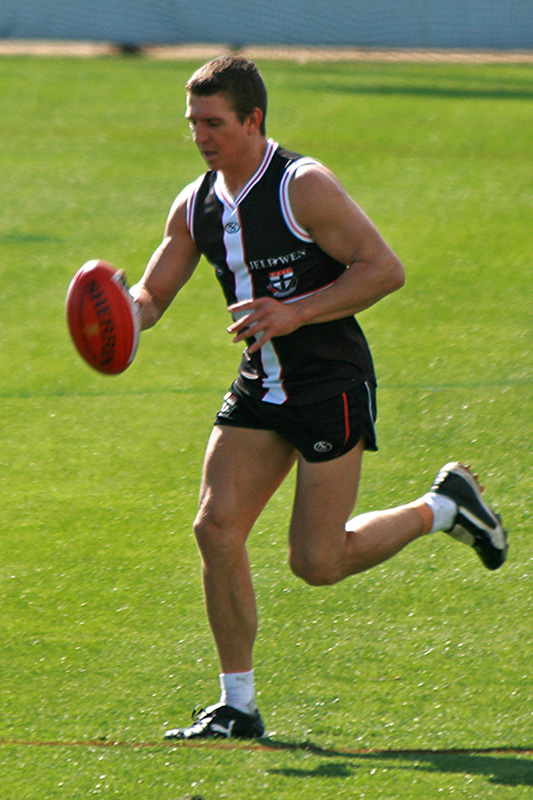
Steven Baker of St Kilda Football Club demonstrates the running bounce.

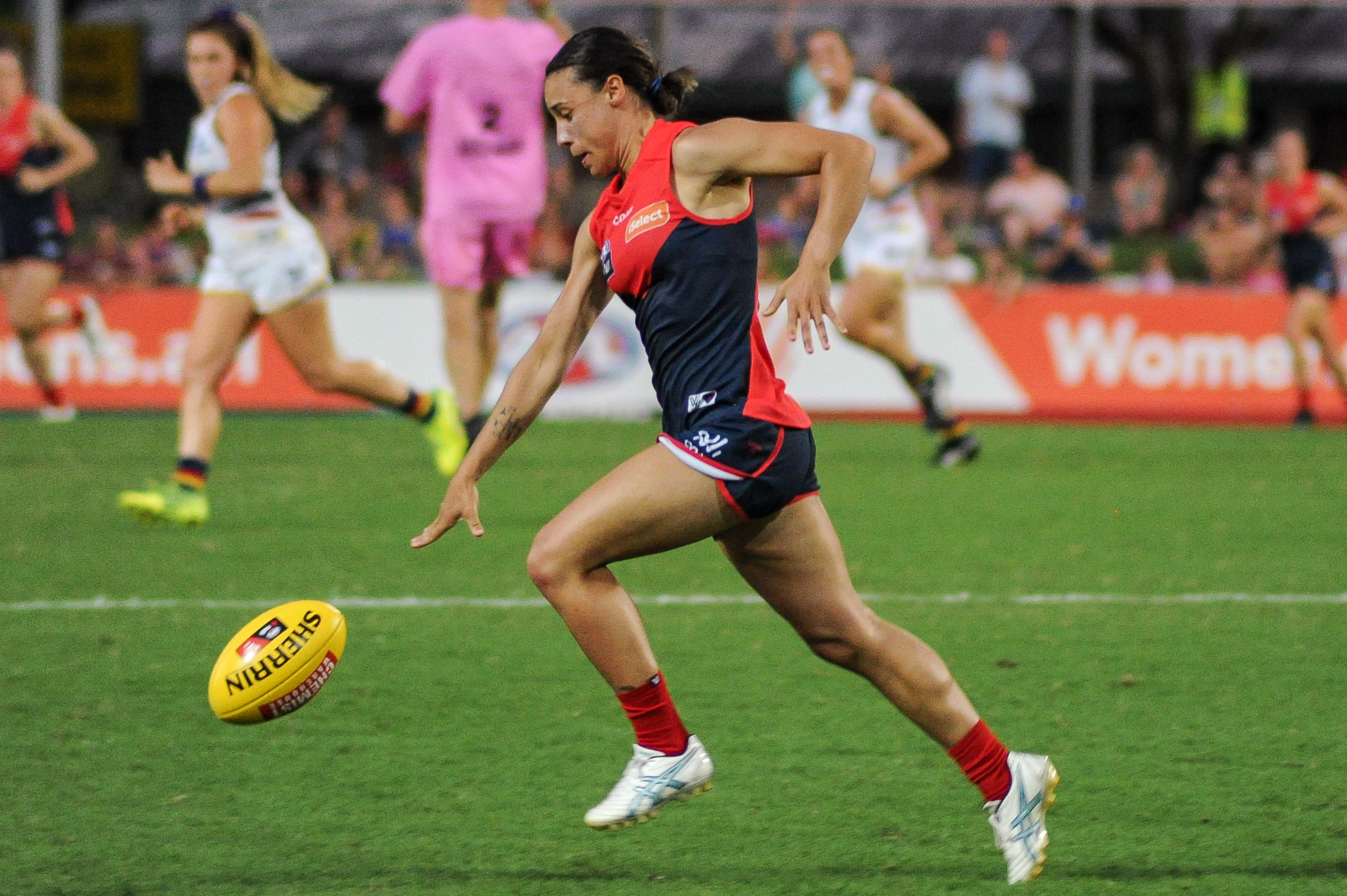
Aliesha Newman of the Melbourne Football Club executes a running bounce

A running bounce, or simply bounce, is a skill in the sport of Australian rules football (necessitated by the Laws of the Game) and some variants where a player bounces (or touches) the ball on the ground in order to run more than the maximum distance with the ball (currently 15 metres/16 yards/50 feet in most competitions).

The earliest record of the running bounce is its use by the Geelong Football Club in 1862, as a means of slowing down the player in possession of the ball and to create more opportunities for a turn over. It became an official part of the Laws of the Game in 1866. The bounce is regarded as a distinctive feature, and one of the most difficult skills to master, of the sport. Observers sometimes compare it to dribbling in basketball which appeared in the 1890s or bouncing in Gaelic football which appeared in the 1900s.

The feature of the game led to the sport early on being referred to as "bouncing football" in some places in the early 20th Century (such as Western Australia, the United States and Canada) to distinguish it from other variations of football.

== Origins and evolution ==
The origins of the running bounce are unknown. Anecdotally it had been practiced by footballers during the Victorian gold rush who had been playing under a variety of rules as early as the 1850s.

Historians infer that the Geelong Football Club had, sometime prior to 1862, introduced a rule to touch or bounce the ball on the ground every few yards. The club had been playing under rules which historian Graeme Atkinson considered likely to have been drawn up prior to the Melbourne Football Club's first rules on 17 May 1859. Unlike Melbourne's, Geelong's first rules appear to have never been published and though believed to have been written down are believed to have been lost completely. A reprint of what were believed to have been the Geelong's eleven 1859 rules appeared in the Geelong Advertiser in 1923 courtesy of Fred Blackham from an old folded card, which appeared to differ only slightly from Melbourne Football Club's rules and do not mention a requirement to bounce the ball. These reprinted rules were not dated and likely to be from a later period. The Melbourne Football Club from its formation until its first matches against Geelong in 1860 is not known to have either played with or enforced such a rule. Mangan (1992) states that the bounce was introduced due to an ongoing dispute between Geelong and Melbourne which came to a head during a match in 1862. Melbourne members familiar with the Rugby school rules were regularly flouting their own rules of not running with the ball (particularly H. C. A. Harrison but also Tom Wills) carrying it great distances while not being penalised by the umpires. The rules at the time were written in such a way as it could be interpreted by the umpire that the players were allowed sufficient time (to continue to run) for as long as they needed to prepare an effective kick, that is, virtually indefinitely. Geelong, asserting that the game was not meant to be played like rugby, began to enforce its rule of bouncing for matches between the two clubs. An early version of the Geelong-Melbourne rule had stipulated that "no player shall run with the ball unless he strikes it against the ground every five of six yards".

Another early mention of such a rule comes from the Christchurch Football Club in New Zealand, which drafted its own rules in 1863 (prior to adopting rugby). This club was known to have initially played with a rule to bounce the ball every 4 yards. This was a time when the football codes were still being established and regularly exchanged rules and ideas around the world. According to some, it may have come from an Australian club as at least one was known at the time to have had a bouncing rule. The club believes without stating a source that it was more likely to have been influenced by the rules of the Blackheath F.C. in England. Blackheath's 1862 rules include rule 12 "When a player running with the ball grounds it, it cannot be touched by anyone until he lifts his hand from it". Touching the ball on the ground while running may have found its way into common practice for some early football clubs. However the club believes that its rules differed from Blackheath's in that it specifically required the ball to be bounced and 22 players per side, though were otherwise similar.

Nevertheless, Geelong and other Victorian clubs continued to agitate for the rules and by 1866 there were moves to standardise it. The rules committee chaired by H. C. A. Harrison on 8 May 1866 sought to pacify them. Melbourne was determined to increase this distance and proposed rule 6. "Ball must be bounced every 10 or 20 yards if carried". Harrison requested Geelong ratify change before publishing the new rules which became known as the Victorian football rules in May 1866. The new rule was promoted as a way to slow down the player in possession of the ball and to create more opportunities for a turn over, thus helping to increase the number of disposals and encourage more dynamic team play. Harrison himself was one of the fastest runners in the game, known for his ability to evade opponents while running the length of the field ball-in-hand. Arthur Conan Doyle considered it "very sporting of [Harrison] to introduce the bouncing rule, which robbed him of his advantage."

The rule was well received by players and spectators alike, and considered attractive to watch.

== The skill ==
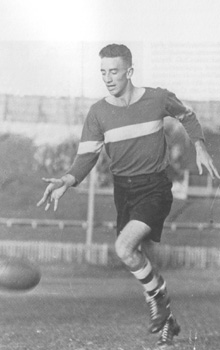
Ross Hutchinson executes a running bounce in the 1930s

Australian football is played with an ellipsoidal (oval-shaped) ball, rather than a spherical one, so developing the technique for bouncing the ball back to oneself while running requires practice. To execute a running bounce, a player should:

- Hold the ball in their preferred hand; with that hand on top of the ball towards the end closest to their body, and angle the ball around 30° upwards from the horizontal.
- While running, push the ball firmly to the ground around 1.5–2 metres (4.9–6.6 ft) in front of them, angling the ball slightly with a quick flick of the wrist, so that it strikes the ground towards the end furthest from the player's body, tilted slightly downward.

Executed properly by a player running at a normal pace, the ball should bounce directly back into their waiting hands.

Players need to readjust the distance of their bounces when running at different paces. When running faster, the ball must be bounced further in front of the player, and when running slower, the ball must be bounced closer. At very slow or stationary paces, this correction is more difficult, because it is difficult to correctly angle the ball for the return bounce at such a short distance.

Australian children (in Australian rules football states) generally learn how to execute running bounces over a few years while they play at school and in junior levels, so to top-level players, the running bounce is a natural skill.

Nevertheless, bouncing an oval-shaped ball is still a volatile skill. Even top level players will occasionally lose the ball while bouncing it, by accidentally bouncing the ball on its point, only to see it quickly skid away from them.

== Rules ==
The rules of football state that a player running on the field with the ball must take a running bounce at least once every fifteen metres. If they run too far without taking a running bounce, the umpire pays a free kick for running too far to the opposition at the position where the player oversteps their limit. The umpire signals running too far by rolling their clenched fists around each other – similar to false starts in American football, or traveling in basketball.

While the distance of 15 metres (50 ft) is explicit in the rules, the lack of markings on the ground makes it impossible for umpires to accurately judge these free kicks. Regular watchers of football generally have a feel for the average time between running bounces which feels right, and umpires usually penalise players when they exceed this by more than a few steps.

Instead of executing a running bounce, players may bend over and touch the ball onto the ground. It must be touched with both hands or a free kick will be rewarded to the opposing team. This has the disadvantage of taking much longer, increasing the risk of being tackled by an opponent, but it has the advantage of reducing the risk of making a bad bounce and dropping the ball. This technique is often used on rainy days when the mud or water on the ground makes a regulation bounce much more difficult, but is also used by some players, particularly in lower levels, who have yet to master the running bounce.

The bounce is not considered a correct disposal as throwing is not allowed under the rules, and a player who bounces is considered still to be in possession of the football while it is out of his hands. Under the holding the ball rule, bouncing the ball while being tackled results in the tackler being rewarded with a free kick.

== Statistics ==
Running bounce statistics have been kept since 1999, and their numbers have varied considerably over that time. During that period, bouncing reached its peak in 2006 with an average of 20.7 running bounces per team per match. Between 2018 and 2023, running bounces were at their lowest, averaging only between 5 and 6 per team per match; on occasion, a team may execute no running bounces in a match.

Running bounces are most commonly made by attacking half-back flankers, also known as link-men, or by outside/receiving midfielders. They generally accept the ball from a rebound, and have wide space in front of them to run into, giving teammates time to create options at half-forward. Through the recorded history of running bounce statistics up to 2024, Brent Harvey holds the record for the most bounces with 1055 (which excludes any he recorded in the first three seasons of his career, which were before 1999), while Adam Saad holds the record for highest average bounces per game, with 3.45.

Mick McGuane kicked a famous goal after seven consecutive bounces from the centre bounce, resulting in the 1994 Goal of the Year (Video on YouTube). Nathan Bock, currently holds the AFL record for running bounces with 20 in a game in 2009 and Heath Shaw holds the record for an AFL season with 167 in 2009.

== Related skills ==
The requirement that a player performs a specialist skill in order to be allowed to run with the ball is common and necessary in many sports. Introducing these skills prevents players from taking the ball in hand and running the length of the field unchallenged. In this way, the running bounce is related to:

- dribbling in basketball; first appeared in the 1890s
- the running bounce in Gaelic football, first used in the 1900s, now once every 4 steps but no more than one consecutive bounce
- the solo in Gaelic football (player kicking it to themself) which has been used in the AFL but does not count as the ball does not make contact with the ground or travel the required distance for a mark. Australian rules fullbacks were once required to perform a similar action to exit the goal square when kicking out.

The running bounce should not be confused with the ball-up, also often referred to as a bounce. The ball-up is an unrelated umpiring skill used to restart play from a neutral contest.

== Games and Variants with running bounce ==
- Australian rules football
- AFL 9s (players may only bounce once)
- Nine-a-side footy (players may only bounce once)
- Women's Australian rules football
- Gaelic Football
- Ladies' Gaelic Football
