= Holding the ball =

Football playing rule in Australia

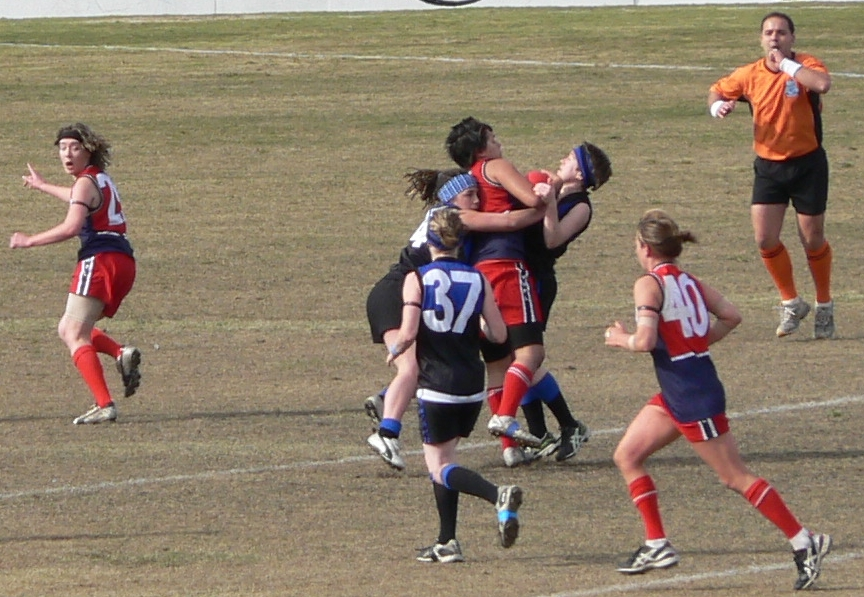
A Women's Australian rules football player is caught "holding the ball", wrapped up in a gang tackle by two opponents. The field umpire (in orange) is about to signal "holding the ball" to penalise the player in possession and award a free kick to the first tackler.

Holding the ball is an infraction in Australian rules football. The rule results in a free kick being awarded against a player who fails to correctly dispose of the football upon being tackled by an opponent, although not under all circumstances. The rule provides the defending team a means to dispossess a player who is running with the football, and prevents players from slowing the play.

The holding the ball rule dates to the formative years of the game. It has a long history as one of the most contentious rules in the game and one of the most difficult to umpire consistently, in large part due to the several points of umpire discretion involved in its interpretation.

== Official rules ==
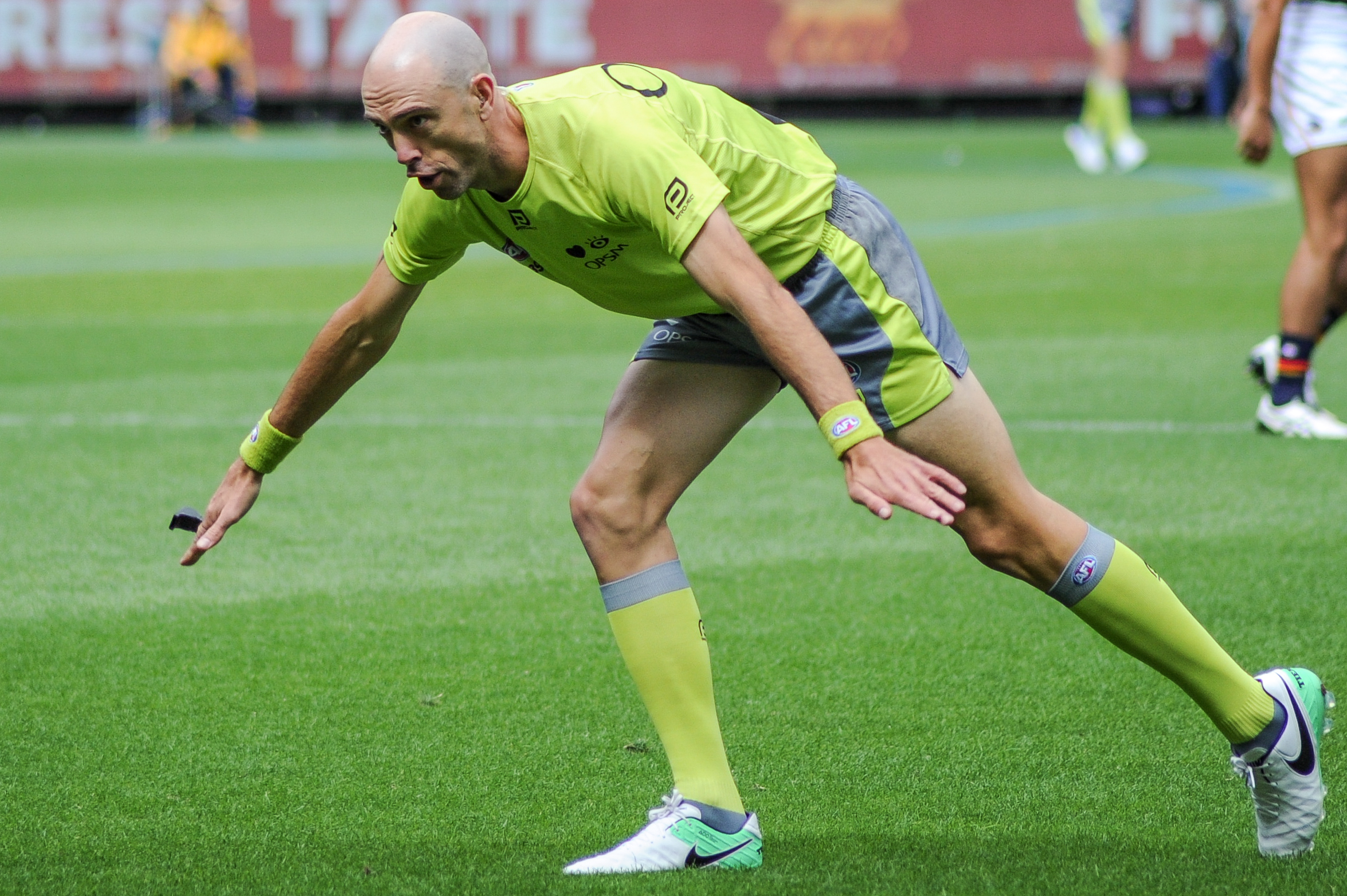
Umpire Matt Nichols signals holding the ball in an AFL match after blowing the whistle

Under the 2021 release of the Laws of Australian Football, holding the football is covered by Law 18.6. Four specific clauses apply, mostly depending upon how the player came to be in possession of the ball. The wording of these variations in the laws is as follows:

- 18.6.2 Holding the ball: Prior Opportunity – Where a Player in Possession of the Football has had Prior Opportunity, a field Umpire shall award a Free Kick if that Player does not Correctly Dispose of the football immediately when they are Legally Tackled.
- 18.6.3 Holding the ball: Incorrect Disposal – Where a Player in Possession of the Football has not had Prior Opportunity, a field Umpire shall award a Free Kick if that Player elects to Incorrectly Dispose of the football when Legally Tackled. For the avoidance of doubt, a Player does not elect to Incorrectly Dispose of the football when:
  - (a) the Player genuinely attempts to Correctly Dispose of the football
  - (b) the Legal Tackle causes the football to be dislodged from the Player’s possession.
- 18.6.4 Holding the ball: No Genuine Attempt – Where a Player in Possession of the Football has not had Prior Opportunity, a field Umpire shall award a Free Kick if the Player is able to, but does not make a genuine attempt to Correctly Dispose of the football within a reasonable time when Legally Tackled.
- 18.6.5 Holding the ball: Diving on Top of the Football – A field Umpire shall award a Free Kick against a Player who dives on top of or drags the football underneath their body and fails to immediately knock clear or Correctly Dispose of the football when Legally Tackled.

A Prior Opportunity is defined in Law 1.1 (Definitions and Interpretation) as a player who has possession of the ball and:

- (a) is balanced and steady; or
- (b) attempts to evade or fend an opponent; or
- (c) has taken a mark or been awarded a free kick; or
- (d) has driven their head into a stationary or near stationary opponent

Also relevant is the definition of possession in Law 1.1, which states that a player is still in possession of the ball while executing a running bounce, even during the period of time when the ball is not in the player's hands. The practical consequence of this on the holding the ball law is that a player who is tackled while bouncing the ball is considered 'holding the ball', even if the tackler releases the player during the skill.

The umpire signals holding the ball by leaning forward and sweeping both arms below his body and out to his sides. Customarily, spectators will shout "Ball!" when they believe a holding the ball free kick should be paid.

=== Points of discretion ===
Although it has long been commonly understood that a player assumes prior opportunity at some stage shortly after he has taken possession of the ball, it was not until the 2019 rewrite of the Laws of the Game that a comprehensive definition of prior opportunity was formally enshrined in the Laws. Prior to 2018, other than a few specific scenarios which were prescribed in the laws, the general duty to define and interpret what constituted a prior opportunity was left to the discretion of the umpires, acting on the direction of the umpiring coaches. There remains no explicit definition within the rules for a "reasonable time" to dispose of the ball, nor for a "genuine attempt" to dispose of the ball, and so these remain fully at the discretion of the umpire and at the direction of the umpiring coaches.

== Contention ==
Perhaps in no sport is there a rule which has given rise to more discussion, or caused more difficulty in its interpretation than this law of the Australian game.

— The Advertiser, 1927.

Most football supporters endorse the view that the holding-the-ball-holding-the-man rule is the most contentious in the law book governing the national code.

— The Advertiser, 1951.

High on the list of criticisms is one of the game's perennial debates – the holding the man/holding the ball rule.

— The Canberra Times, 1989.

Holding the ball remains Australian football's most complicated and annoying rule.

— The Advertiser, 2014.

Holding the ball, and at times its pairing with the holding the man rule, has been one of the most contentious rules in Australian rules football throughout almost the entire history of the sport, for a wide variety of reasons. Confusion and inconsistency are the chief causes of this contention, which in large part arises from the many different facets of the rule, the amount of discretion and judgement umpires must exercise, the fact that different field umpires may interpret the same scenario in different manners, and the lack of formal definitions for 'prior opportunity', 'reasonable opportunity' and 'genuine attempt'. Specific points which often cause contention include:

- How to interpret a 'reasonable opportunity' to dispose of the ball. For example, in a scenario with no prior opportunity, spectators would normally expect holding the ball to be paid if the player is still holding it after being swung around 360° in a tackle, but the umpire may elect not to do so if he feels a genuine attempt has been made to dispose of the ball or if the player breaks the tackle.
- How to interpret a 'genuine attempt' to dispose of the ball. It is not uncommon for player seeking to force a stoppage and avoid a free kick to feign an attempt to handpass the ball by punching it with one hand while not actually releasing it with the other. It is at the umpire's discretion whether he deems this a genuine attempt or not.
- How to interpret cases of dropping the ball. Unintentionally dropping the ball or having the ball dislodged is legal under the definitions in Law 18.6.3 and illegal otherwise, but the rules which distinguish these cases are detailed and complicated.

Another point of contention among football observers regards how stringently the rule should be applied to make for an optimum spectacle. Applying the rule less strictly will tend to lead to congested play and an increase in the number of stoppages, because players who are tackled after having won the contested ball would rather hold it to force a neutral stoppage than kick the ball into a potential turnover. Applying the rule more strictly leads to a scenario which discourages players from trying to win the contested ball, as they find that it is more profitable to wait for an opponent to win the ball, then earn a free kick by tackling them; such a practice is considered to be against the spirit of the game as a contest. Changes to the rule throughout history have generally been brought about by moving undesirably close to one of these extremes, but many observers have differing opinions on which is the less desirable outcome and what the optimum interpretation would be.

== History ==
=== Early laws ===
The holding the ball rule has its origins in Rule 8 of the Melbourne rules, the rule which placed limitations on a player's freedom to run with the ball. By the early 1870s, it had become common practice that a player running with the ball should drop it upon being held by an opponent; this was enshrined in the rules by 1876, with Rule 8 including the stipulation "in the event of a player with the ball in hand trying to pass an adversary, and being held by him, he must at once drop the ball," with a free kick to be paid for a breach of the rule.

Application of the law in the early years and throughout the first half of the 20th century would appear extremely stringent to a spectator familiar with the modern application of the rule. In general, the tackler needed to do little more than grip an opponent by the guernsey with one hand, not necessarily even retarding his progress, to earn a free kick. The full body tackle which would be seen in modern playing style was not necessary, and was very uncommonly seen because executing one would almost always result in conceding a holding the man free kick – that rule was also applied very stringently at the time, so a full body tackle would almost always linger for some time after the player had dropped the ball, and therefore would always be penalised. Until even the 1950s, full body tackling was thought of by the football-going public as a "rugby tackle": and while it was legal within the rules, it was so scarcely seen that many thought it to be illegal.

=== Standardised laws ===
One of the early difficulties encountered by the Australasian Football Council, which owned and administered the laws of the game from 1906 onwards, was in establishing a consistent interpretation the holding the ball rule between the different states. Sportswriters noted a particularly wide disparity between the interpretations of the rule in South Australia and Victoria: in South Australia, the rule was applied extremely stringently, with a defending player needing to do little more than touch a player running with the ball to force him to drop it, making it almost impossible for a player to run with the ball in the vicinity of opponents; but that in Victoria, a more significant hold or tackle was required to earn a free kick, resulting in players more willing to run through packs of opponents. These wide differences often led to difficulties in interstate matches.

Particularly under the stricter interpretations of the rule, a problem emerged in that players were finding that standing back and allowing an opponent to win the ball before immediately tackling him to win a free kick was more profitable than attempting to win the ball and risking being tackled himself. This practice, known in those times as "malingering", was and still is considered undesirable, as it was believed that a rule which discouraged players from winning contested ball was against the spirit of the game. The banning of the flick pass in 1925, forcing players to use the more cumbersome punch pass, exacerbated this by making it more difficult to dispose of the ball.

Several attempts were made during the 1920s to standardise and clarify the rules. In 1920, the Australasian Football Council amended its wording of the rule, replacing the word "caught" with "held" when describing the act of tackling, to attempt to make it clear that the defending player must do more than simply touch the ball-carrier to win a free kick. The rule was then rewritten entirely in 1928, when it was removed from the original Rule 8 (which by this time had been renumbered) and was added as a stand-alone rule. The new rule, intended to be less stringent, read: "A free kick shall be given against a player who, while being held by an opponent, and being in possession of the ball, does not at once kick, handball or drop it so as to relinquish possession of it. The free kick shall be given to the player who holds him. A player shall not be deemed to be held within the meaning of the foregoing paragraphs unless he is held firmly enough to stop him or to retard his progress."

=== No-drop holding the ball ===
An undesirable style of close-in play had emerged by the 1930s: a player with the ball would be tackled, would drop the ball at his feet, wait for his opponent to release him, then bend down and regather the ball, with this sequence of events repeated over and over with both men trying to win a free kick – either for holding the ball or holding the man – rather than actively trying to move the football. These contests then attracted other players and formed scrimmages which slowed the game down. To eliminate this style of play, the concept of "no-drop holding the ball" was developed. This took away the provision for a player to drop the ball upon being tackled, and required him to dispose of the ball by kick or handpass; it was intended that the kick or handpass would clear the ball away from scrimmages around the tackled player. This change was a major change to the Laws of the Game, eliminating the sixty-year-old provision to drop the ball when tackled, but was a change which is fundamental to the modern interpretation of the rule.

The Australian National Football Council first introduced no-drop holding the ball nationally prior to the 1930 season, although some small competitions had played under the rule earlier (the Victorian Junior Football Association, for example, introduced the rule in 1927). It was unpopular in the early months, and was blamed for an increase in congested play and an increase in injuries caused by players attempting wild kicks when previously they would have dropped the ball. Consequently, the change was hastily repealed after only two months.

No-drop holding the ball was next introduced by the Victorian Football Association (VFA) in 1938. The VFA, which did not come under the National Council's influence, introduced the rule as part of a suite of novel rule changes, which also included the legalisation of throwing the ball as a type of handpass. The VFA's combination of the no-drop rule and throwing the ball had the immediate effect of reducing congestion, as it gave players the easy option to throw the ball into open space when tackled, instead of dropping the ball at their feet and causing a scrimmage to form around it.

"In my day [the early 1920s], when a good player got his hands on the ball, it was almost certain he would get a kick some way or another. He could drop the ball when grabbed by an opponent, or play it in front of him and snatch it up again, all the time battling physically and with his wits to beat his opponent. Nowadays it doesn't matter how good a man is, as soon as he is touched he has to get rid of the ball, often hurriedly and without direction. The game is called up too much and there are too many pauses."

— South Australian champion Dan Moriarty on the no-drop rule, The News, 1946

The National Council quickly followed the VFA's lead, re-instating the no-drop rule from the 1939 season, but it did not pair it with the throwing the ball rule. The no-drop rule again proved to be unpopular. Without the ability to execute a drop or a VFA-style throw, players were forced to rely on the more cumbersome disposal methods of a kick or a handpass; because umpires had conventionally called holding the ball penalties almost immediately when a player was tackled, it was very difficult (and sometimes impossible, depending upon the quickness of the presiding umpire) to execute either of these skills before conceding a free kick, and those who did manage to dispose of the ball often committed turnovers in doing so. Consequently, players favoured malingering over winning the contested ball more so than ever before. South Australian umpire Frank Armstrong commented that the no-drop rule became known as "the Bludger's Rule" among umpires during this time, since the rule so heavily favoured the tackler over the ball-winner.

To rectify the problems, a more liberal interpretation of the rule was gradually adopted by the state leagues during the mid-1940s, then was formally codified into the Laws nationally in 1948. The new rules eliminated the requirement for the player to dispose of the ball "immediately", and replaced it with the stipulation "umpires must give the player who is in possession of the ball a reasonable chance of disposing of it before free kicking him," first introducing the concept of a 'reasonable chance/time' which remains enshrined in the modern laws. Giving a reasonable chance, according to the VFL umpires' coaches in 1951, meant that a player who had bent down to pick up the ball would be given enough time to stand up and execute a disposal, or a player who collected the ball in full stride would be given time to balance himself. Additionally, five scenarios were specifically written into the 1948 Laws which were not to be considered 'holding the ball':

- (a) a Player is bumped and the football falls from the Player's hands;
- (b) a Player's arm is knocked which causes the Player to lose possession of the football;
- (c) a Player's arms are pinned to their side by an opponent which causes the Player to drop the football;
- (d) a Player, whilst in the act of Correctly Disposing of the football, is swung off-balance and does not make contact with the football by either foot or hand;
- (e) a Player is pulled or swung by one arm which causes the football to fall from the Player's hands.

These changes helped to reduce malingering and provide incentive to win the hard ball; but, they introduced further points of discretion and sources of inconsistency to the umpire.

=== Recent changes ===
The wording of the holding the ball rule remained more or less unchanged for the next forty or fifty years, but the interpretation of the rule was adapted to suit changes to the game. As full body tackling became a fundamental part of the game, the interpretations of holding the ball (including what constituted a 'reasonable opportunity' to dispose of the ball) and holding the man were adjusted to suit.

Adjustments made to the rules in the late 1970s created definitions removing the ability for players to bounce the ball or handpass to themselves as ways to avoid holding the ball free kicks or win holding the man free kicks. Richmond footballer Kevin Bartlett was particularly well known for using these tactics to avoid being penalised for holding the ball, and the rule changes are generally associated with his play.

The next and last major change to the holding the ball rule was the introduction of the 'prior opportunity' rule. The rule was initially introduced in 1986 and known as the "perfect tackle rule": tackling a player who had an opportunity to dispose of the ball before being tackled was defined as a perfect tackle, and the provision for a perfectly tackled player to have a reasonable time to dispose of the ball before being penalised was eliminated. The rule was introduced to speed up the game. This later became the modern 'prior opportunity' rule in 1996, and it was the first time that different holding the ball interpretations had been applied on the basis of what had taken place before the tackle was laid. As part of this change, the five specific scenarios which did not attract a free kick from the 1948 Laws were divided: scenarios (a) and (b) were still not considered 'holding the ball' under any circumstances; scenarios (c–e) were now considered 'holding the ball' if there was prior opportunity, but not 'holding the ball' without.

Since then, only small adjustments have been made to the holding the ball rules. A rule under which a ruckman was considered to have assumed prior opportunity immediately upon catching the ball on the full in a ruck contest was added to the Laws of the Game in 2003, then removed in 2019. The definition under which a player ducking and driving his head into an opponent is considered to have had a prior opportunity was introduced in 2015. Finally, in 2019, the increasingly unwieldy law was copyedited and its wordcount in the laws was reduced by more than half, without significantly changing its intent: among the changes, the five scenarios added in 1948 were removed from the rules and replaced with the two more general clarifications in the present Law 18.6.3; and a paragraph which clarified the scenario of the ball being held to an opponent's body by the tackler was removed.

== See also ==
- Laws of Australian rules football
- Holding the man
