= H. C. A. Harrison =

Australian rules footballer, born 1836

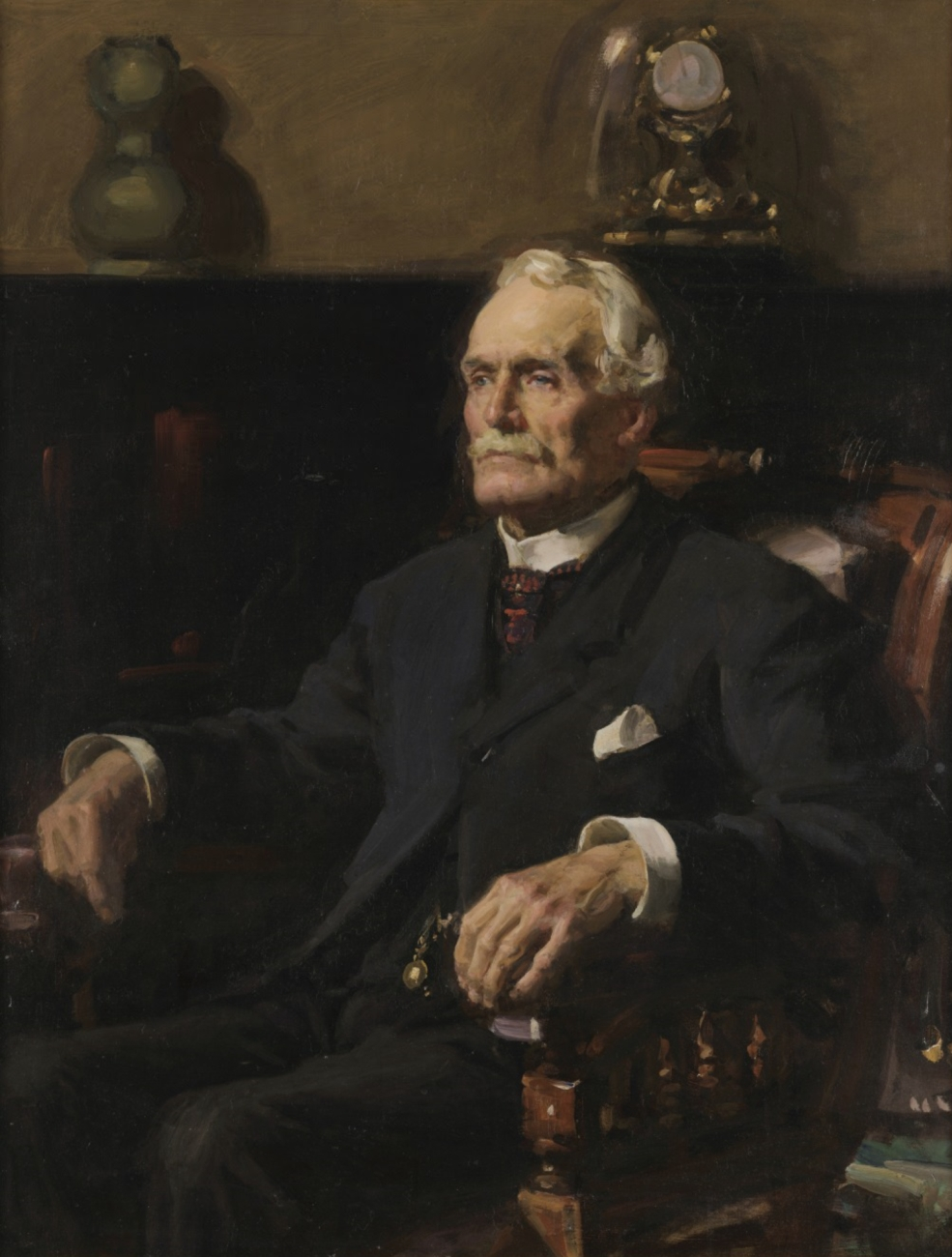
- Portrait of Harrison by John Longstaff, 1929

Personal information
- Full name: Henry Colden Antill Harrison
- Born: 16 October 1836; Jarvisfield, New South Wales
- Died: 2 September 1929 (aged 92); Kew, Victoria

Career highlights
- Chairman of the Australian Football Council; Australian Football Hall of Fame; Melbourne Hall of Fame

Henry Colden Antill Harrison (16 October 1836 – 2 September 1929) was an athlete and Australian rules footballer who played a leading role in pioneering the sport.

Harrison's cousin, champion cricketer Tom Wills, captained an early incarnation of the Melbourne Football Club in 1858, and the following year co-wrote its laws―the basis of Australian rules football. Within a year, Harrison joined him in promoting the new code, and quickly emerged as a leading player, celebrated for his speed, strength and courage. He oversaw an 1866 revision of the code that formalised the running bounce, and captained Melbourne and Geelong before retiring from playing in 1872. He then took on several important administrative roles, including the vice presidency of the newly formed Victorian Football Association (VFA) in 1877, and the chairmanship of the first Australian Football Conference in 1905. He also won fame as the champion amateur runner of Victoria, remaining undefeated for nine years in both sprints and hurdles.

By the 1880s and well into the mid-20th century, Harrison was widely regarded as the "Father of Australian Football"—a title that has since been disputed as a result of more in-depth scholarly analysis of football's origins, which shows that Harrison joined the game after its codification, and that football's early development was largely a collaborative process. Nonetheless, Harrison remained for many years the sport's "most formidable voice", and the honorific title of "Football's Foster Father" has been applied to him by some modern historians.

The Harrison Stand at the Melbourne Cricket Ground, as well as Harrison House―the former headquarters of the Victorian Football League (VFL)―were named in his honour in 1908 and 1930, respectively. Harrison and Wills were inducted into the Sport Australia Hall of Fame in 1989, and in 1996, they were the only pioneer figures to be inaugural inductees of the Australian Football Hall of Fame.

== Early life and professional work ==
Harrison was born at 'Jarvisfield', near Picton, New South Wales, the son of John Harrison, a sea captain who had become a grazier, and his wife Jane, née Howe. In about 1837, the family moved to the Port Phillip District, and took up land on the Plenty River about 20 miles (32 km) from Melbourne. Some years later, they moved to the present site of St Arnaud.

After leaving school, he spent a short time in the Victorian goldfields. H. C. A. Harrison entered formal employment at the Victorian Customs Department.

Harrison remained with Customs for 35 years, before transferring to the Titles Office in 1887. He became Registrar of Titles in 1889, retiring in 1896. His autobiography, The Story of an Athlete, was published in 1923. Harrison died at Kew, in Melbourne, on 2 September 1929, aged 92.

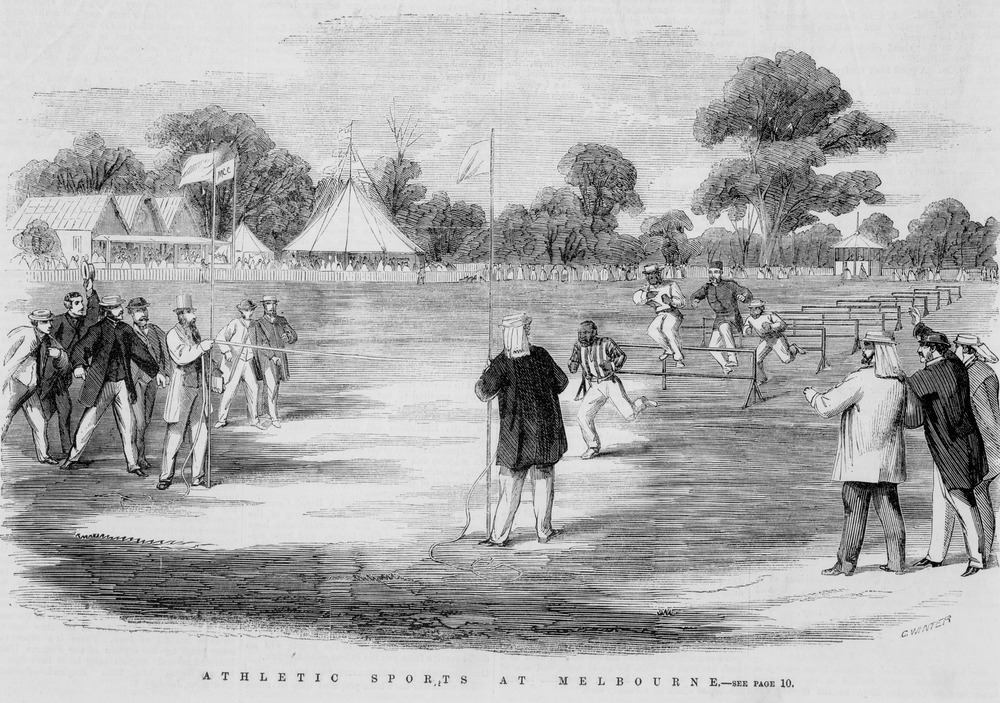
Harrison and members of Tom Wills' Aboriginal cricket team engaged in a hurdle race, MCG, January 1867

== Football and cricket ==
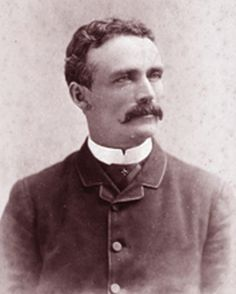
H. C. A. Harrison

Harrison's cousin Tom Wills began to codify Australian rules football in Melbourne, in 1858. Wills' game spread across Australia and is today the most popular sport in the country. Some sources state that Harrison was involved and/or that he took part in the drafting of the first set rules, by the Melbourne Football Club (1859); Wills and Harrison were later recognised as the "Fathers" of Australian rules. However, there is no hard evidence that Harrison was involved in the development of Australian rules during the 1850s.

On 8 May 1866, Harrison chaired a meeting of club delegates in order to draft a revised set of rules, and his changes were unanimously agreed upon. A major development in these revised rules was Rule 8, which read: "The ball may be taken in hand at any time, but not carried further than is necessary for a kick, and no player shall run with the ball unless he strikes it against the ground every five or six yards." The running bounce was adopted to curtail the speed of the fastest players, in particular Harrison. Arthur Conan Doyle, creator of Sherlock Holmes and fan of Australian rules football, remarked: "I thought it was very sporting of Harrison, as the fastest runner of his day, to introduce the bouncing rule, which robbed him of his advantage."

In 1884 he visited London where he proposed unifying Australian rules with Rugby under a set of hybrid rules and suggested that rugby clubs adopt some of Australia's rules. English football officials were insulted at the suggestion that they "abandon their rules to oblige an Antipodean game".

Following his retirement, Harrison was president of the Melbourne Football Club from 1897 to 1906.

== Legacy ==
In 1908, a newly completed grandstand at the Melbourne Cricket Ground (MCG), designed by William Pitt, was named after Harrison. It was demolished in 1936 to make way for the Southern Stand. Harrison continues to be honoured at the MCG with the H. C. A. Harrison Room, located in the Ponsford Stand.

A building on Spring Street, Melbourne was purchased by the VFL in the 1920s to serve as their new headquarters, and was named Harrison House in his honour. It was sold and demolished in the 1980s despite appeals from various heritage groups for its preservation.

The Harrison Medal, which is awarded to the best player in Division 2 at the AFL Under 18 Championships is often mistakenly thought to be named in his honour. It is, however, named after longtime NTFL administrator Hunter C. Harrison.
