= Timekeeping (Australian rules football) =

Timekeeping in Australian rules football is the duty of timekeepers, who are employed or appointed to keep track of the duration of the match from a location off the field, to account for the duration of stoppages (known as time on and time off), and to signal the end of each quarter by blowing a siren. Timekeepers, whether independent or club-appointed, are used at all levels of Australian rules football.

== Laws ==
A senior professional Australian rules football match is played in four quarters, each lasting twenty minutes of playing time – that is, twenty minutes when the ball is in play. For most types of stoppage to play, the twenty minute time clock is stopped, which is known as time off; the clock is then restarted when the ball returns to play, or otherwise at the direction of the umpire, which is known as time on. As a result of this, it is typical for a twenty minute quarter to last between 27 and 34 minutes in total. The period of time after the 20-minute mark is also known as that quarter's "time on".

"Time off" begins when a goal umpire signals a score, a boundary umpire signals the ball is out of bounds, a field umpire signals a stoppage for a ball-up, or a field umpire calls "time off" for any other reason (such as an injury or to retrieve the ball if it been kicked away from a player who has earned a free kick) by raising one hand and blowing the whistle. "Time on" occurs when the ball is bounced, thrown in, returned to play after a score, when the umpire calls "time on" by raising one hand and blowing the whistle again, or when the ball is otherwise legally back in play. A player with a free kick while time is off cannot take the kick or restart play until time is back on; the umpire will call the ball back and force a re-kick if this happens. The timekeepers have the responsibility to watch all play and determine when to switch time on and off.

The timekeepers bring an end to a quarter after twenty minutes of playing time by manually activating a loud siren audible across the venue. The quarter ends immediately when any field umpire hears the signal, unless a mark or free kick has already been awarded in which case the kick may be taken after the siren. The field umpire is the sole arbiter of whether an on-field act occurs before or after the siren.

The timekeepers' twenty minute clock is never visible at an Australian football ground; instead, a count-up clock which starts at zero and does not stop during time off is displayed. This means that players and spectators never know exactly when the game is about to end. However, at the professional level the coaches' boxes have access to the twenty minute clock, allowing them to communicate remaining time to their teams; since the 2020s, this is often done with signboards from the interchange bench. Television networks are provided a feed to the twenty minute clock, and this is displayed as a countdown clock on most broadcasts.

The Laws of the Game allow for any controlling body to set its own time rules which differ from the standard. Notably, in the AFL Women's, quarters are played over seventeen minutes; in the first fifteen minutes, time on is applied only for goals and significant injuries; in the final two minutes, time on applies to all stoppages. It is common at junior levels, or in professional practice matches, to play quarters over a fixed duration without applying time on for any type of stoppage.

== Historical ==
Before off-field timekeeping was common, match time was kept on a watch by the field umpire. The use of off-field timekeepers who signalled the end of a quarter or half by ringing a bell began in the early 1880s, and became mandated under the Victorian Football Association's laws in 1887. Bells were replaced with electric sirens at VFL grounds in 1949 and 1950, eventually being used at all levels; manual bells were retained for back-up purposes.

Under the Laws of the Game, timekeeping is performed by at least two timekeepers. This allows one to handle the clock and one to watch the play for time off and time on signals. Throughout most of football history and at all levels of the game including the top leagues, one timekeeper was supplied by each of the competing clubs, ensuring equal representation of both clubs in the timekeepers' box; in modern times, league-appointed independent timekeepers are common.

When off-field timekeepers were first in place, the length of each quarter was 25 minutes plus time on solely at the discretion of the field umpire. Automatic time on during stoppages for goals and behinds was introduced to the Laws of the Game by the Australian National Football Council for the 1928 season, and later added for boundary throw-ins as well. In 1994, the AFL Commission adopted the shorter 20-minute quarter, and introduced time-on for many other stoppages, including all ball-ups.

Early manual timekeeping was done by both timekeepers using a watch, manually recording the seconds of "time on" from each interruption, tallying the time on throughout the quarter, and using that to calculate when to sound the bell or siren. Over time, special stop clocks which could be used to track time on were invented, although manual tallying remained a part of the timekeepers' duties for a long time.

Until 1910, timekeeping and bell-timing disputes which resulted in formal protests against match results were relatively common, often related to whether the field umpire had allowed play to go on beyond the sounding of the bell. After 1911, the stipulation that "the field umpire shall be the sole judge as to the first sound of the bell," was added to the laws of the game, absolving timekeepers and providing clarity in cases when the bell was rung but the field umpire failed to hear it.

For VFL/AFL matches, television networks first began displaying the timekeepers' countdown clock on broadcasts from 1988, meaning television viewers do not experience the same uncertainty at the timing of the final siren as those at the ground. The only exception since this time was on Network Ten: during its period of holding broadcast rights between 2002 and 2011, Ten displayed a 'five minute warning' and switched to the count-up clock inside the last five minutes' playing time in the final quarter, to preserve the surprise ending.
