= Ball-up =

Method to restart play in Australian football

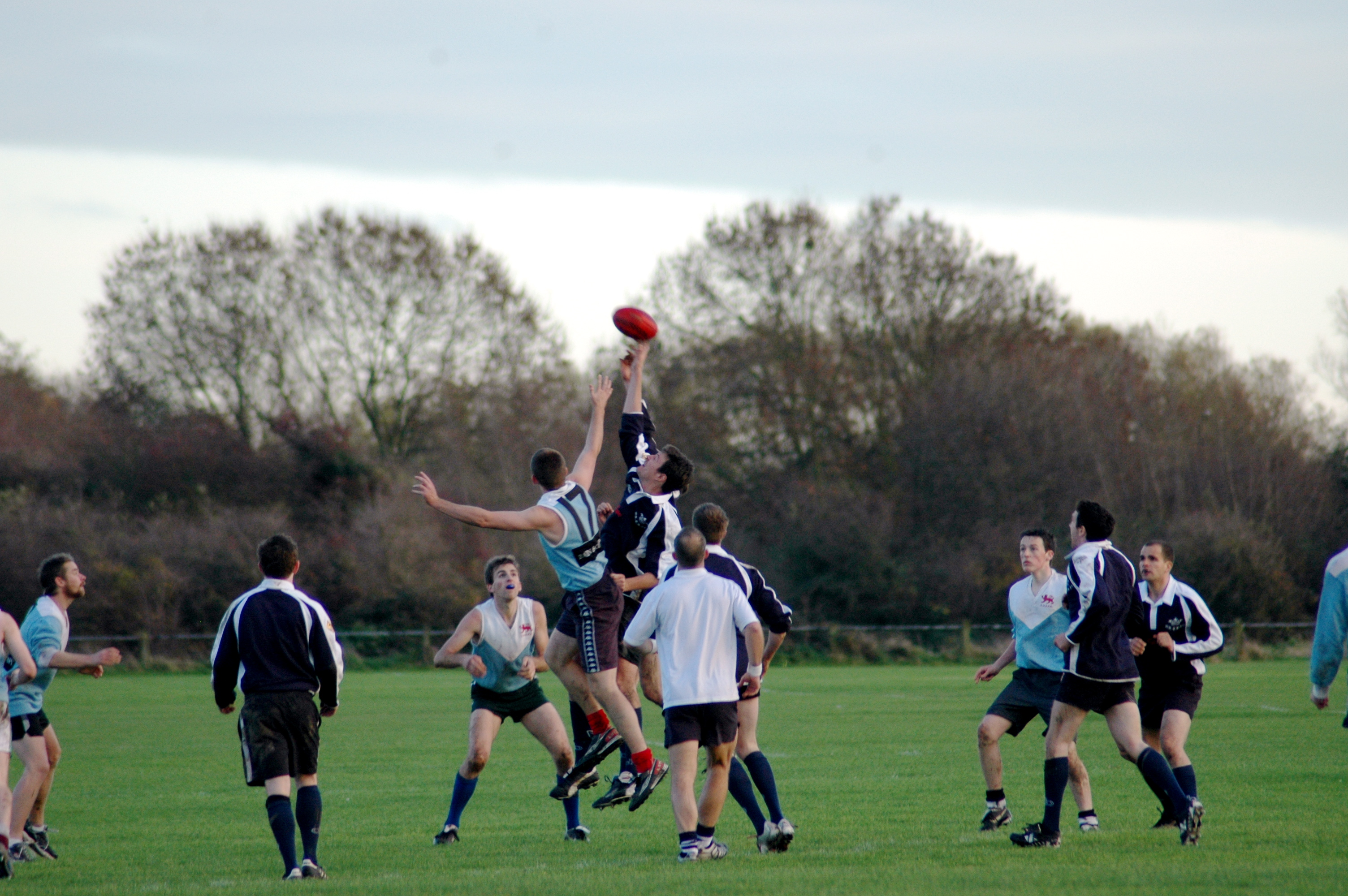
Contesting the centre ball-up in England

A ball-up (pl. ball-ups) in Australian rules football is the method by which the field umpire restarts play at a neutral contest after a stoppage within the field of play. It involves throwing the ball up between two players, known as rucks, who then attempt to win possession for their teams.

A related type of contest, the boundary throw-in, occurs to restart play after the ball has gone out of bounds. It is governed by similar rules, although is not itself known as a ball-up.

Ball-ups have been part of the Laws of the Game since 1872. Ball-ups are the equivalent of a jump ball, faceoff or dropped ball from other team sports.

== Execution ==
To execute a ball-up, the field umpire throws the ball vertically upwards. The ball is then contested by the teams' rucks, this is known as a ruck contest. Generally, the rucks try to jump and tap the ball down to one of the team's rovers. To that end, the height to which the ball is thrown needs to be at least above the outstretched arms of the teams' rucks; rucks may also try to take clean possession of the ball, or allow it to fall to ground and become a ground contest. The ruck is one of the most specialised positions in an Australian rules football team, and it is usually one of the tallest players or players with the highest vertical leap on the team.

== Rules ==
A centre ball-up is staged at the beginning of each quarter and after each goal. A general ball-up is staged after all other neutral stoppages in play, with the exception of after the ball goes out of bounds, which is restarted by a boundary throw-in. The rules governing a centre ball-up differ from those of a general ball-up.

=== Ball-up ===
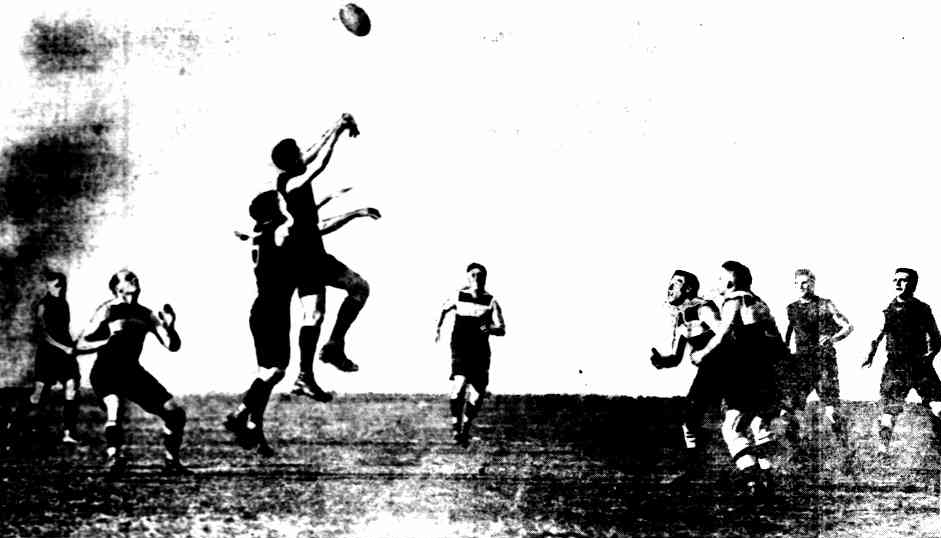
Ruck contest in the SANFL in 1924

A ball-up may be contested by only one player (generally the one of a team's primary rucks) from each team, nominated by the players and confirmed by the umpires prior to throwing the ball. (Historically, a third person—known as "third man up" in AFL—was allowed for a ruck contest, but this provision was outlawed for the 2017 AFL season and beyond. There is no restriction on the positioning of other players around the contest, provided there is space for the umpire to execute the ball-up; this includes leaving a corridor immediately behind the umpire for him to retreat into. The two rucks must stand apart and may not physically engage each other until the umpire has bounced or thrown the ball, but once the ball is in flight, they may engage in the ruck contest.

A free kick is awarded in a ruck contest if a player:

- Is the first to touch the ball in the air but is not one of the nominated rucks (as per the 2017 change mentioned above)
- Touches or interferes with the ball before it reaches the apex of its trajectory
- Illegally pushes the opposing ruck out of the contest.
- Illegally blocks the opposing ruck from the contest
- Rucks the ball out of bounds on the full

The rule requiring that only one ruck from each team contest the ball was introduced in 2017. Prior to this, a common strategy was for one ruck to block the other while a team-mate entered the ruck contest and won the tap-out, becoming what was known as a third man up.

The ball-up has been a feature of the Laws of the Game since 1872; prior to this, a scrimmage would be allowed to continue until the ball was won.

=== Boundary throw-ins ===
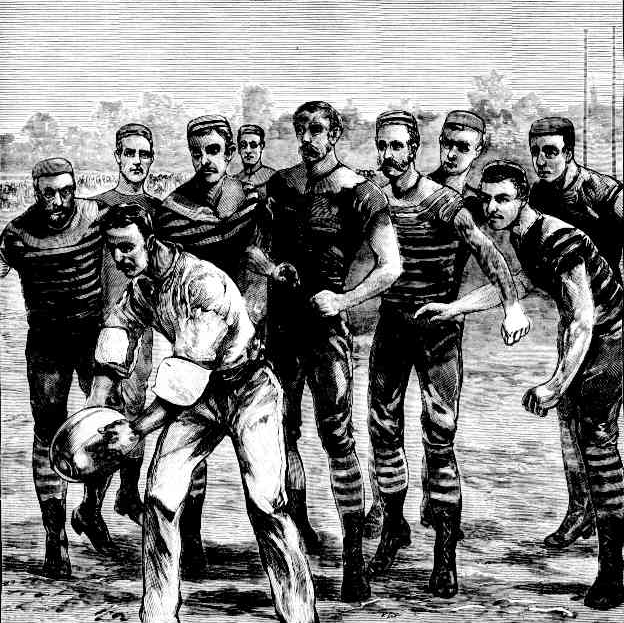
Boundary-throw in during a Carlton and South Melbourne match in 1882.

A boundary throw-in occurs to restart play after the ball goes out of bounds. The boundary umpire stands at the point where the ball went out of bounds, back turned the players, and flings the ball high and backwards over his head towards the ruck contest; the ball spins end-over-end. The same rules governing the ruck contest itself apply equally to a boundary throw-in as a ball-up.

Boundary throw-ins were not always used in the sport's early history. Specialist boundary umpires were introduced in 1904, with the field umpire performing the restart before this. Originally, the umpires punched ball back into play; in 1910, this was changed to a short backwards throw-in, extended to a long backwards throw in 1920, and was replaced with a ball-up near the boundary line in 1921. The modern boundary throw-in was reintroduced in 1931 and has persisted since then.

=== Centre ball-up ===
Australian rules football ground markings are used for the centre ball-up

The laws governing a centre ball-up are more prescriptive, and lead to a different style of contest. Several rules consider the markings on the ground:

- The ball is thrown in the very centre of the ground
- When the ball is thrown, each ruck must be:
  - Outside the 3m centre circle
  - Inside the 10m centre circle
  - On the team's defensive side of the centre line
- The team's other players have defined positions, with three inside the centre square (but outside the 10m circle), six in each 50m arc, and one on each wing

These restrictions apply only to the initial centre throw. An around-the-ground ball-up which happens to be at or near the centre of the ground is not subject to these restrictions.

These markings were introduced over time to manage a variety of issues. The centre square (originally a centre diamond) was introduced in 1973 to prevent congestion from having too many rovers around the contest. The centre line was introduced in 1982 to prevent rucks from wrestling prior to the ball-up. The 10-metre circle was introduced in 2005 to limit the length of the ruck's run-ups, as posterior cruciate ligament injuries caused by front-on knee clashes at centre ruck contests had become a common problem over the previous years.

The centre ball-up was introduced to the Laws of the Game in 1891. Prior to this, the ball was kicked off from the centre of the ground by the team who was scored upon (or, as determined by the coin toss at start of the game).

== Bounces ==
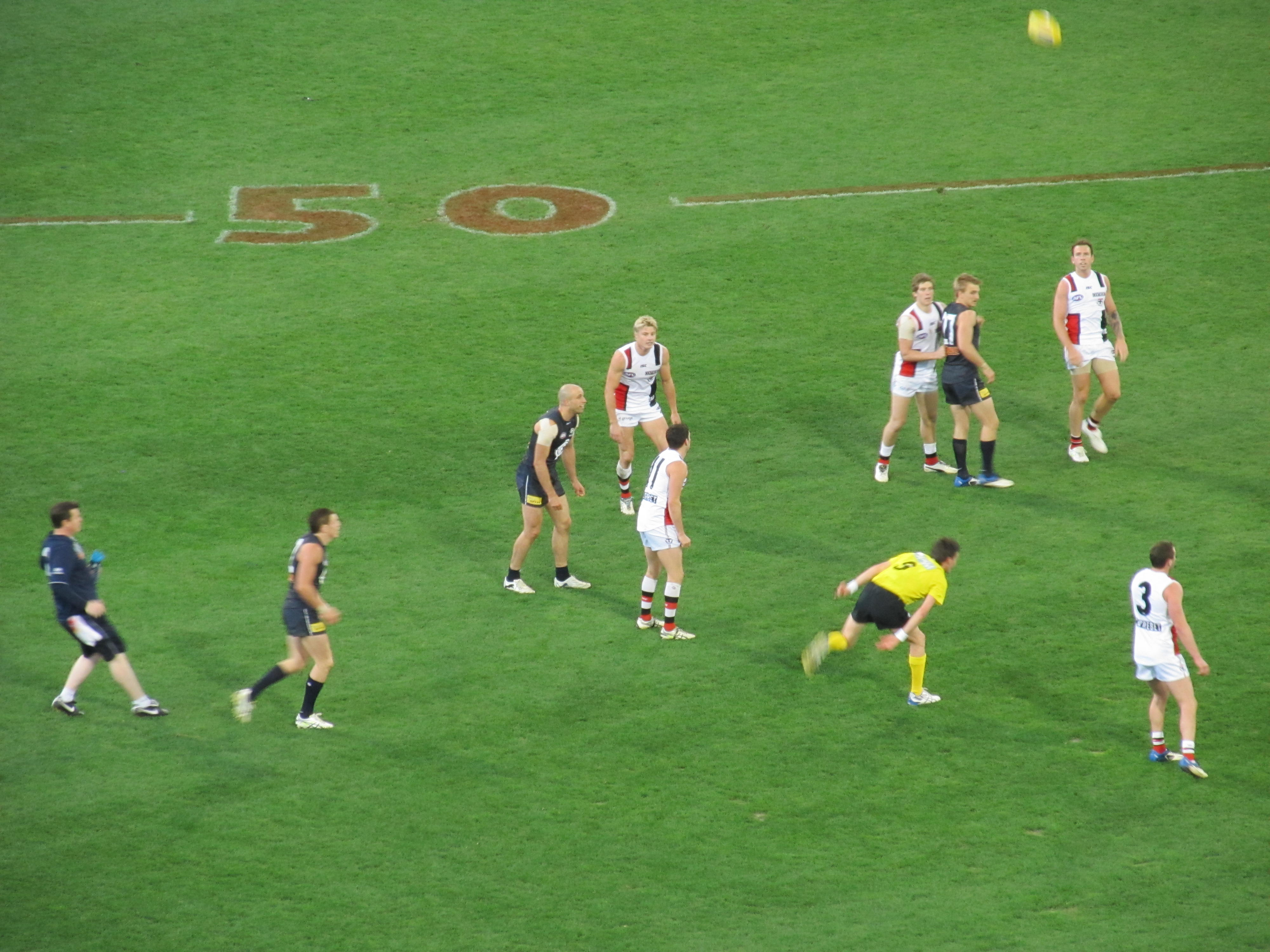
Umpire Matt Stevic bounces the ball in a game between Carlton and St Kilda, 2011.

For much of the history of the game, ball-ups were executed by bounce rather than throw: the umpire would throw the ball firmly on the ground such that it bounces several metres up into the air approximately, although not always perfectly vertical. When first introduced to the game in the 1870s, ball-ups were originally thrown; however, bouncing had become common from as early as 1880. The rules formally changed to mandate a bounce in 1887, although an umpire could elect to throw instead of bounce the ball at their discretion if soft or wet ground conditions prevented bouncing.

The umpire's bounce was phased out from the game in the 21st century. From 2013 until 2025, all ball-ups except for centre bounces were executed by throw, with an umpire allowed to recall an errant centre bounce which skewed in such a way that it did not create a fair contest between the two rucks. If the controlling umpire determined that a centre bounce was uncontestable (usually due to an askew trajectory), they would stop the play and reset the surrounding player positions and execute a second ball-up by throw. From 2026, the centre bounce was also replaced with a throw.

The skill of being able to bounce an obloid-shaped ball vertically upwards on a grass surface had been unique to Australian rules football, and was much loved by traditionalists. However, it is very difficult to master, and it was blamed for deterring aspiring umpires from pursuing the job, or hindering competent decision-makers from reaching the top levels of umpiring. The bounce was also physically demanding on the back and hamstrings and was a major cause of field umpire injuries. These two effects were compounding, with physical demands limiting the amount of time umpires could spend perfecting the craft. These reasons led many umpires to favour the removal of all bounces.

== Other ==
Long run-ups and front-on knee clashes during centre bounces became a common cause of posterior cruciate ligament injuries for ruckmen in the early years of the 21st century. In addition to introducing the 10-metre circle to limit run-up length, free kicks were introduced against rucks that led with a raised knee.

In the 1999 preseason, rubber pads were installed in the very centre of AFL venues to give the umpires a reliable surface for centre bounces. These were quickly removed after Adelaide ruckman Shaun Rehn slipped on one and suffered a serious knee injury.
