= Tom Wills =

Australian sportsman (1835–1880)

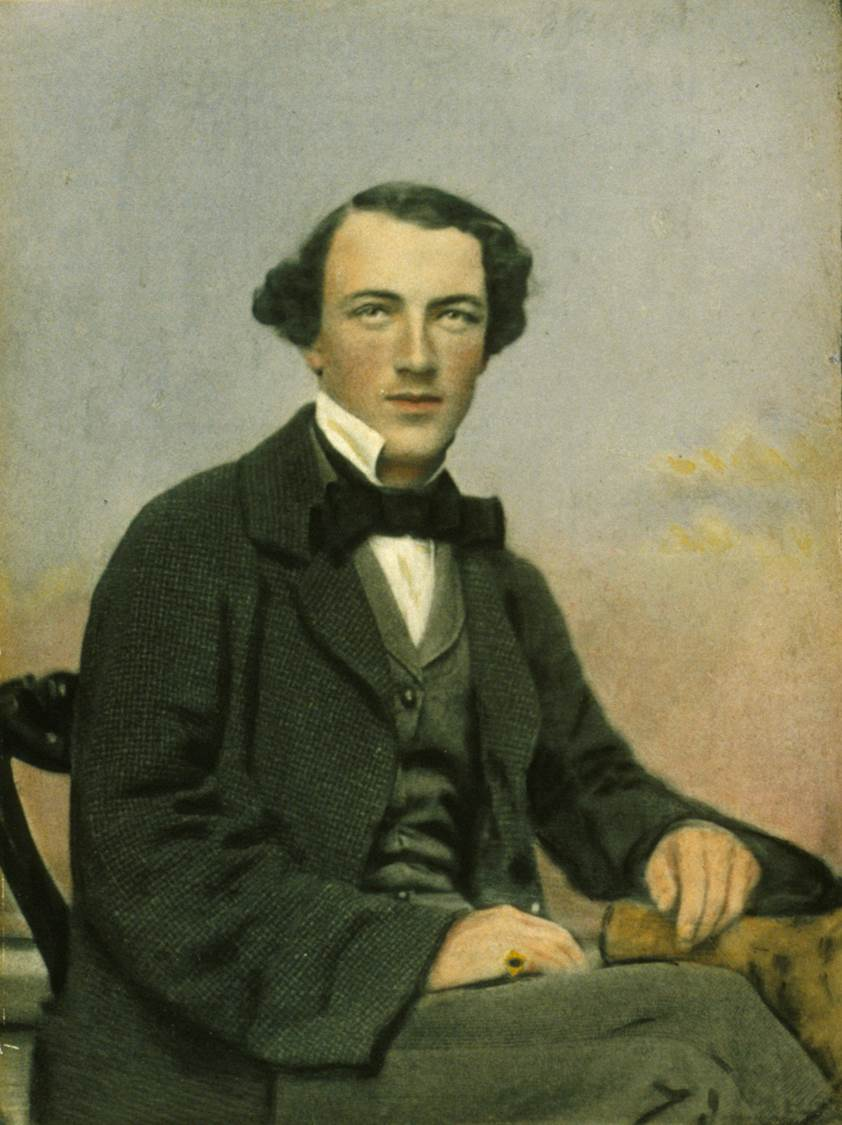
- Wills, c. 1857
- Born: Thomas Wentworth Wills; 19 August 1835; Molonglo Plain, Colony of New South Wales
- Died: 2 May 1880 (aged 44); Heidelberg, Colony of Victoria
- Cause of death: Suicide by stabbing
- Resting place: Warringal Cemetery, Victoria, Australia
- Partner: Sarah Barbor
- Parent(s): Horatio Wills; Elizabeth McGuire
- Relatives: Thomas Antill (cousin); H. C. A. Harrison (cousin)

Thomas Wentworth Wills (19 August 1835 – 2 May 1880) was an Australian sportsman who is credited with being Australia's first cricketer of significance and a founder of Australian rules football. Born in the British penal colony of New South Wales to a wealthy family descended from convicts, Wills grew up in the bush on stations owned by his father, the squatter and politician Horatio Wills, in what is now the state of Victoria. As a child, he befriended local Aboriginal people, learning their language and customs. Aged 14, Wills went to England to attend Rugby School, where he became captain of its cricket team and played an early version of rugby football. After Rugby, Wills represented Cambridge University in the annual cricket match against Oxford, and played at first-class level for Kent and the Marylebone Cricket Club. An athletic bowling all-rounder with tactical nous, he was regarded as one of the finest young cricketers in England.

Returning to Victoria in 1856, Wills achieved Australia-wide stardom captaining the Victoria cricket team to repeated victories in intercolonial matches. He played for the Melbourne Cricket Club but often clashed with its administrators, his larrikin streak and defections to rival clubs straining their relationship. In 1858, seeking a winter pastime for cricketers, he publicly called for the formation of a "foot-ball club" with a "code of laws". He captained a Melbourne side that winter, and in 1859 co-wrote its laws—the basis of Australian rules. Over their careers, he and his cousin H. C. A. Harrison further developed the game as players, umpires and administrators. In 1861, at the height of his fame, Wills went to outback Queensland to help run a new family station. Soon after his arrival, his father and 18 station personnel were killed in Australia's largest massacre of colonists by Aboriginal people. Wills survived and returned to Victoria in 1864, and in 1866–67, he led an Aboriginal cricket team on an Australian tour as its captain-coach.

In a career marked by controversy, Wills subverted cricket's amateur-professional divide, and was accused of popularising intimidatory tactics, such as the head-high bouncer. He also earned a reputation for bending sporting rules to the point of cheating, in particular throwing. This he boasted about, and in 1872 he became the first cricketer to be called in a top-class Australian match. Dropped from the Victorian team, Wills failed in an 1876 comeback attempt, by which time he was considered a relic of a bygone era. During this period, he supported Australia's first organised women's cricket team—the only prominent male cricketer to do so. His final years were characterised by social alienation, flights from creditors, and heavy drinking, likely as a means of numbing post-traumatic stress disorder symptoms that resulted from the massacre. In 1880, suffering from delirium tremens, Wills fatally stabbed himself in the heart.

Australia's first sporting celebrity, Wills fell into obscurity after his death, but has undergone a revival in Australian culture since the 1980s. Today he is described as an archetypal tragic sports hero and as a symbol of reconciliation between Indigenous and non-Indigenous Australians. He has also become the central figure in "football's history wars"—an ongoing dispute over whether Marn Grook, an Aboriginal ball game, influenced early Australian rules. According to biographer Greg de Moore, Wills "stands alone in all his absurdity, his cracked egalitarian heroism and his fatal self-destructiveness—the finest cricketer and footballer of the age".

== Family and early years ==
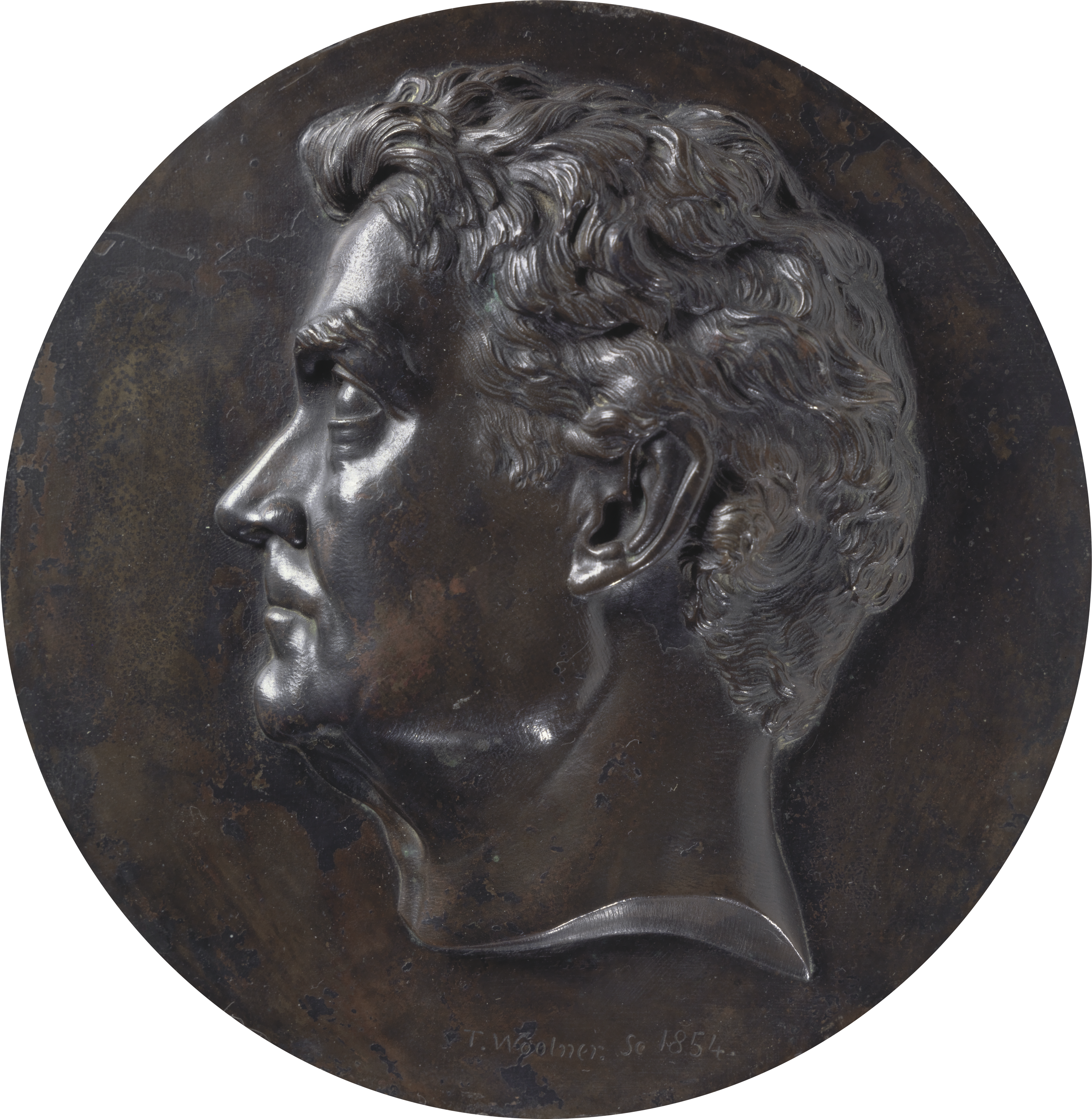
Wills's middle name comes from his childhood role model William Wentworth, the statesman, explorer and "fighter for the rights of the Australian born".

Wills was born on 19 August 1835 on the Molonglo Plain^{[a]} near modern-day Canberra, in the British penal colony (now the Australian state) of New South Wales, as the elder child^{[b]} of Horatio and Elizabeth (née McGuire) Wills. Tom was a third-generation Australian of convict descent: his mother's parents were Irish convicts, and his paternal grandfather Edward was an English highwayman whose death sentence for armed robbery was commuted to transportation, arriving in Botany Bay aboard the "hell ship" Hillsborough in 1799. Granted a conditional pardon in 1803, Edward became rich through mercantile activity in Sydney with his free wife Sarah (née Harding). He died in 1811, five months before Horatio's birth, and Sarah remarried to convict George Howe, owner of Australia's first newspaper, The Sydney Gazette. Mainly self-educated, Horatio worked in the Gazette office from a young age, rising to become editor in 1832, the same year he met Elizabeth, an orphan from Parramatta. They married in December 1833. Seventeen months after his birth, Tom was baptised Thomas Wentworth Wills in St Andrew's, Sydney, after statesman William Wentworth. Drawing on Wentworth's pro-currency writings and the emancipist cause, Horatio, in his nationalist journal The Currency Lad (1832–33), made the first call for an Australian republic.

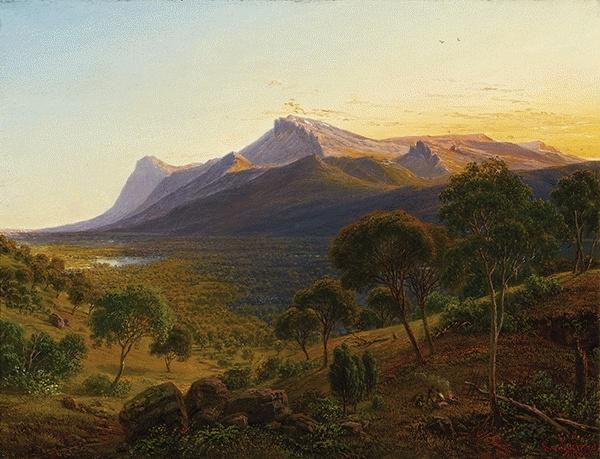
Wills grew up amongst Aboriginal clans in the Mount William area of the Grampians, shown in this 19th-century painting by Eugene von Guérard.

Horatio turned to pastoralism in the mid-1830s and moved with his family to the sheep run Burra Burra on the Molonglo River, near Captains Flat. Tom was athletic from a young age but also prone to illness, his parents at one stage "almost [despairing] of his recovery". In 1840, in light of Thomas Mitchell's account of "Australia Felix", the Willses overlanded south with shepherds and their families to the Grampians in the Port Phillip District (now the state of Victoria). After squatting by Mount William, they moved a few miles north through the foothills of Mount Ararat, named so by Horatio because "like the Ark, we rested there". Horatio went through a period of intense religiosity while in the Grampians; at times his diary descends into incantation, "perhaps even madness", according to scholars. He implored himself and Tom to base their lives upon the Gospel of John.

Living in tents, the Wills family settled a large property named Lexington (near present-day Moyston) in an area used by Djab wurrung Aboriginal clans as a meeting place. According to family members, Tom, as one of the few white children in the area, "was thrown much into the companionship of aborigines". In an account of corroborees from childhood, his cousin H. C. A. Harrison^{[c]} remembered Tom's ability to learn Aboriginal songs, mimic their voice and gestures, and "speak their language as fluently as they did themselves, much to their delight." He may have also played Aboriginal sports. Horatio wrote fondly of his son's kinship with Aboriginal people, and allowed local clans to live and hunt on Lexington. However, George Augustus Robinson, the district's Protector of Aborigines, implicated Horatio and other local settlers in the murder of Aboriginal people. Horatio blamed "distant predatory tribes" for provoking hostilities in the area, and the closest he came to admitting that he had killed Aboriginal people was in a letter to Governor Charles La Trobe: "... we shall be compelled in self defence to measures that may involve us in unpleasant consequences".

Tom's first sibling, Emily, was born on Christmas Day 1842. In 1846 Wills began attendance at William Brickwood's School in Melbourne, where he lived with Horatio's brother Thomas (Tom's namesake), a Victorian separatist and son-in-law of the Wills family's partner in the shipping trade, convict Mary Reibey. Tom played in his first cricket matches at school and came in contact with the Melbourne Cricket Club through Brickwood, the club's vice-president. By 1849, the year Wills's schooling in Melbourne ended, his family had grown to include brothers Cedric, Horace and Egbert. Horatio had ambitious plans for the education of his children, especially Tom:

I now deeply vainly deplore my want of a mathematical and classical education. Vain regret! ... But my son! May he prove worthy of my experience! May I be spared for him—that he may be useful to his country—I never knew a father's care.

== England ==
=== Rugby School ===
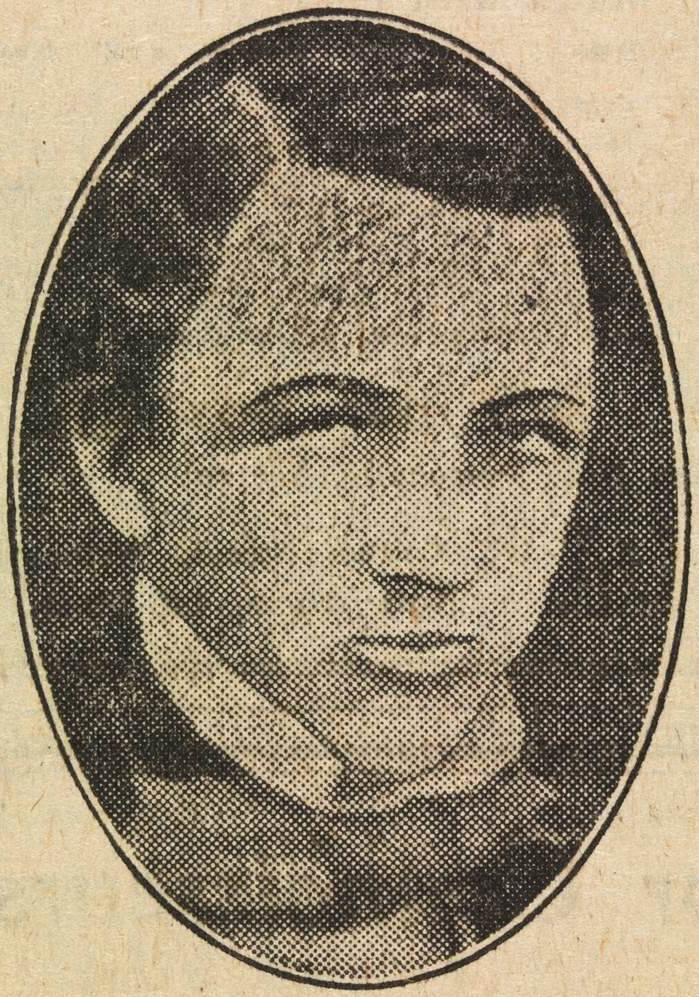
Daguerreotype of Wills, dating from his school years

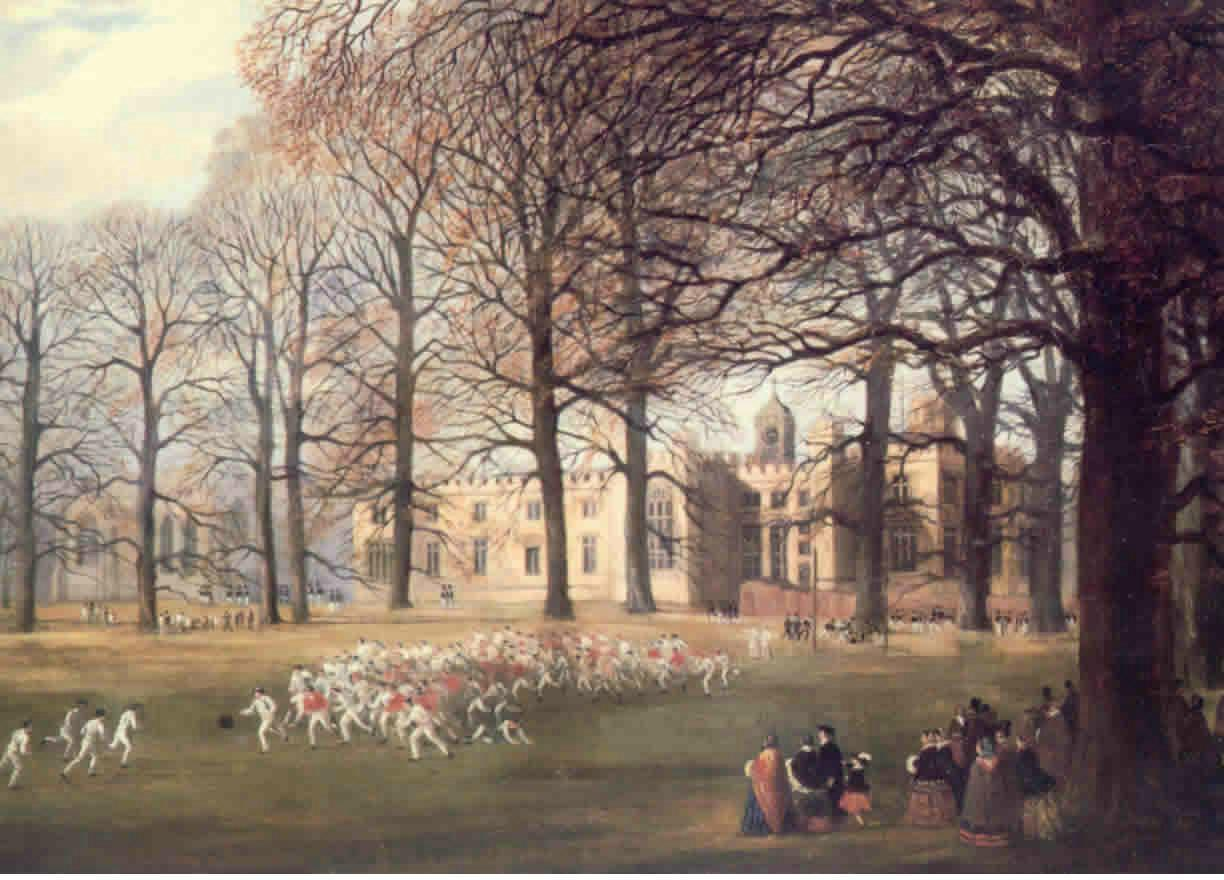
Football at Rugby School, 1850s. Wills was singled out in the national press for his prowess on the field.

Wills's father sent him to England in February 1850, aged fourteen, to attend Rugby School, then the most prestigious school in the country.. In his scheme for his children, Horatio wanted Tom to go on to study law at the University of Cambridge and return to Australia as a "professional man of eminence". Tom arrived in London after a five-month sea voyage. There, during school holidays, he stayed with his paternal aunt Sarah, who moved from Sydney after the death of her first husband, convict William Redfern.

Reforms enacted by famed headmaster Thomas Arnold made Rugby the crucible of muscular Christianity, a "cult of athleticism" into which Wills was inculcated. Wills took up cricket within a week of entering Evans House. At first he bowled underhand, but it was considered outdated, so he tried roundarm bowling. He clean bowled a batsman with his first ball using this style and declared: "I felt I was a bowler." Wills soon topped all of his house's cricket statistics. At bat he was a "punisher" with a sound defence; however, in an era when stylish stroke-play was expected of amateurs, Wills was said to have no style at all. In April 1852, aged sixteen, he joined the Rugby School XI, and on his debut at Lord's against the Marylebone Cricket Club (MCC) a few months later, he took a match-high 12 wickets. While his bowling proved vital that year in establishing Rugby as the greatest public school in English cricket, anonymous critics in the press stated that he ought to be no-balled for throwing. Rugby coach John Lillywhite, considered an authority on bowling, came to his protégé's defence, rescuing him from further scandal. Wills went on to play with, and attracted praise from the leading cricketers of the age, including Alfred Mynn. He ended 1853 with the season's best bowling average, and in 1854 his hero William Clarke invited him to join the All-England Eleven, but he remained at school. The next year, he became Rugby XI captain.

"I know that if I [study] too hard I will become quite ill. We hardly get any play during school time."

— Wills to his father in a lengthy 1851 letter, the majority of which he devotes to his school cricket scores.

Like other English public schools, Rugby had evolved its own variant of football. The game in Wills's era—a rough and highly defensive struggle often involving hundreds of boys—was confined to a competition amongst the houses. Spanning his school years, Wills is one of the few players whose on-field exploits feature in the newspapers' otherwise brief match reports. His creative play and "eel-like agility" baffled the opposition, and his penchant for theatrics endeared him to the crowds. One journalist noted his use of "slimy tricks", a possible early reference to his gamesmanship. As a "dodger" in the forward line who served his house's kicker, he took long and accurate shots at goal. Wills also shone in the school's annual athletics carnival and frequently won the long-distance running game Hare and Hounds.

Wills cut a dashing figure with "impossibly wavy" hair and blue, almond-shaped eyes that "[burnt] with a pale light". By age 16 at 5'8" he had already outgrown his father. In Lillywhite's Guide a few years later he measured in at 5'10" and it was written that "few athletes can boast of a more muscular and well-developed frame".

Consumed by sport, Wills fell behind in academics, much to his father's chagrin. One schoolmate recalled that he "could not bring himself to study for professional work" after "having led a sort of nomadic life when a youth in Australia". Suffering from homesickness, Wills decorated his study with objects to remind him of Australia, including Aboriginal weapons. In a letter to Tom, Horatio informed him that his childhood friends, the Djab wurrung, often spoke about him: "They told me to send you up to them as soon as you came back."

=== Libertine cricketer ===
Tom Wills
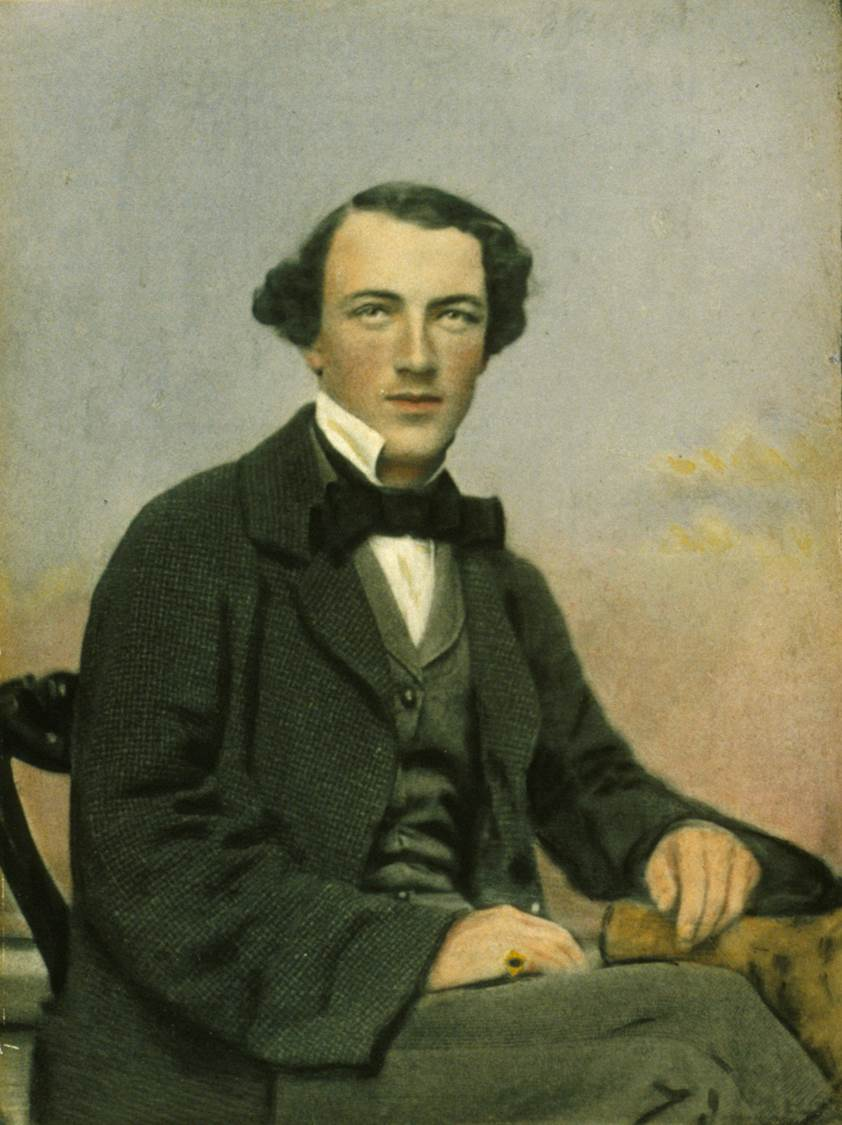

Cricket information
- Batting: Right-handed
- Bowling: Right-arm medium
- Role: All-rounder

Domestic team information
- Years: Team
- 1854: Gentlemen of Kent
- 1855: Gentlemen of Kent and Surrey
- 1855–1856: MCC
- 1855–1856: Kent
- 1856: Kent and Sussex
- 1856: Gentlemen of Kent and Sussex
- 1856: Cambridge University
- 1856/57–1875/76: Victoria
- 1863/64: G. Anderson's XI

Umpiring information
- FC umpired: 1

Career statistics
Competition	First-class
Matches	32
Runs scored	602
Batting average	12.28
100s/50s	0/1
Top score	58
Balls bowled	3,731
Wickets	130
Bowling average	10.09
5 wickets in innings	15
10 wickets in match	3
Best bowling	7/44
Catches/stumpings	20/–
- Source: CricketArchive, 24 April 2012

In June 1855, nearing his 20th birthday, Wills finished his schooling. Hailed as Rugby's exemplar sportsman, his status as a cricketer had come to define him in the eyes of others. In a farewell tribute, fellow students referred to him simply as "the school bowler".

After leaving Rugby, and with a steady supply of money from his father, Wills roamed Britain in pursuit of cricketing pleasure. Regarded as "one of the most promising cricketers in the kingdom", he played with royalty, made first-class appearances for the MCC, Kent County Cricket Club, and various Gentlemen sides, and also fell in with the I Zingari—the "gypsy lords of English cricket"—a club of wealthy amateurs known for their exotic costumes and hedonistic lifestyles. Against Horatio's wishes, Tom, having failed to matriculate, did not continue his studies at Cambridge, but played for the university's cricket team (as well as Magdalene College), most notably against Oxford in 1856 when rules barring non-students from playing in the University Match were ignored, Cambridge claiming to be "one man short". In June, Wills played cricket at Rugby School for the last time, representing the MCC alongside Lord Guernsey, the Earl of Winterton, and Charles du Cane, governor-to-be of Tasmania. Following a month of cricket in Ireland, Wills, at the behest of Horatio, returned to England to prepare for his journey home to Australia.

The last eighteen months had exposed Wills to "the richest sporting experience on earth". His six years in England charted a way of life—one of drinking, reckless spending and playing games—that he would follow until his death.

== Colonial hero ==
Wills returned to Australia aboard the Oneida steamship, arriving in Melbourne on 23 December 1856. The minor port city of his youth had risen to world renown as the booming financial centre of the Victorian gold rush. Horatio, now a member of the Legislative Assembly in the Victorian Parliament, lived on "Belle Vue", a farm at Point Henry near Geelong, the Wills' family home since 1853. In his first summer back in Melbourne, Wills stayed with his extended family, the Harrisons, at their home on Victoria Parade, and entered a Collins Street law firm to appease his father, but he seems never to have practised; the few comments he made about law suggest it meant little to him. "Tom was no dunce", writes Greg de Moore. He was "negotiating a path to greatness."

The Australian colonies were described as "cricket mad" in the 1850s, and Victorians, in particular, were said to live "in an atmosphere of cricket". Intercolonial contests, first held in 1851, provided an outlet for the at times intense rivalry between Victoria and New South Wales. With his reputation preceding him, Wills bore Victoria's hopes of winning its first match against the elder colony. William Hammersley, a former acquaintance in England and now captain of the Victoria XI, recalled Wills's first appearance on the Melbourne Cricket Ground (MCG) for a trial match, staged one week after his return:

... the observed of all observers, with his Zingari stripe and somewhat flashy get up, fresh from Rugby and college, with the polish of the old country upon him. He was then a model of muscular Christianity.

Wills won the match for his side with a top score of 57 not out, and The Age said of his playing style and entertaining ability that "there has not been a more amusing scene on this ground". In the January 1857 intercolonial against New South Wales, held on the Domain in Sydney, Wills was the leading wicket-taker with ten victims, but failed with the bat. Bowling fast round-arm, the Victorians scoffed at the "antiquated" underhand action of their opponents. The latter style proved effective, however, giving New South Wales a 65-run win. Back in Victoria, Wills joined numerous clubs, including the provincial Corio Cricket Club, based in Geelong, and the elite Melbourne Cricket Club (MCC). Although he had a greater affinity for Corio, the MCC maintained that Wills belonged to them, and took offence at his lack of loyalty to any one club. In order to secure Wills in matches between the two teams, the MCC allowed Corio to field an extra five men to make up for his loss.

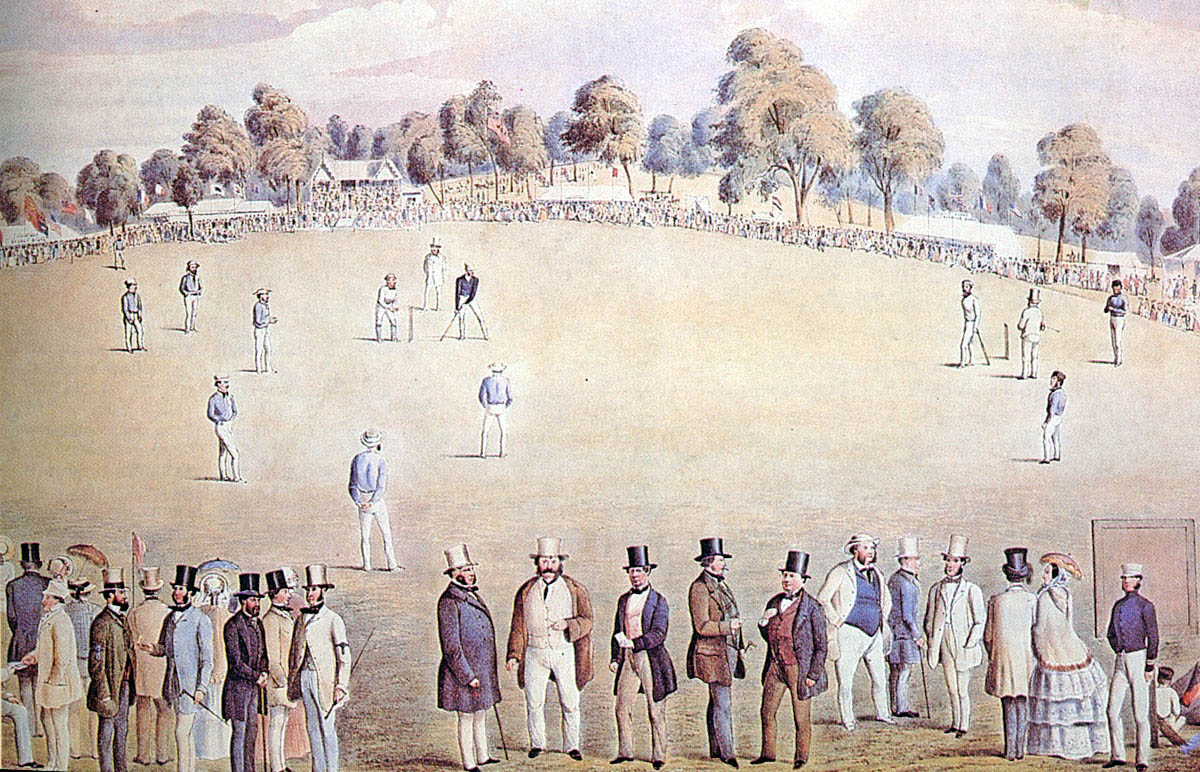
Wills is shown preparing to bowl in an intercolonial match between Victoria and New South Wales, MCG, 1858. He became "an instant colonial hero" after captaining Victoria to its first victory.

Parliament and business came to a standstill in Melbourne for the January 1858 intercolonial match between Victoria and New South Wales, held at the MCG. Captaining Victoria, Wills took 8 wickets, the most of his side, and on the second day, batting in the middle order, a ball hit an imperfection in the pitch and knocked him unconscious. He recovered, played on for two hours, and won the match at day's end with a top score of 49*. The crowd rushed the field and chaired Wills off in triumph, and victory celebrations lasted for several days throughout the colony. Now a household name and the darling of Melbourne's elite, Wills was proclaimed "the greatest cricketer in the land".

Although Wills enjoyed his lofty amateur status, he liked to socialise with and support working class professional cricketers—an egalitarian attitude that sometimes led to conflict with sporting officialdom but endeared him to the common man. Wills's allegiance to professionals was highlighted by an incident in Tasmania in February 1858 when the Launceston Cricket Club shunned professional members of his touring Victorian side. Infuriated, he spoke out against being "forsaken" in a "strange land". One week later, during a game in Hobart, Wills earned the locals' ire as he "[jumped] about exultantly" after maiming a Tasmanian batsman with a spell of hostile fast bowling.

Wills served as the MCC's secretary during the 1857–58 season. It was a role in which he proved to be chaotic and disorganised. MCC delegates took issue with Wills's "continued non-attendance" at meetings, and when the club fell into debt, his poor administrative skills were blamed. In mid-1858, he acted on year-long threats and deserted the club, leaving its records and amenities in disarray; to this day, the only MCC minutes that cannot be found date from his secretaryship. A lasting tension existed between Wills and the MCC's inner circle. According to Martin Flanagan, "It was a relationship which couldn't last as Wills only knew one way—his own."

== Football pioneer ==
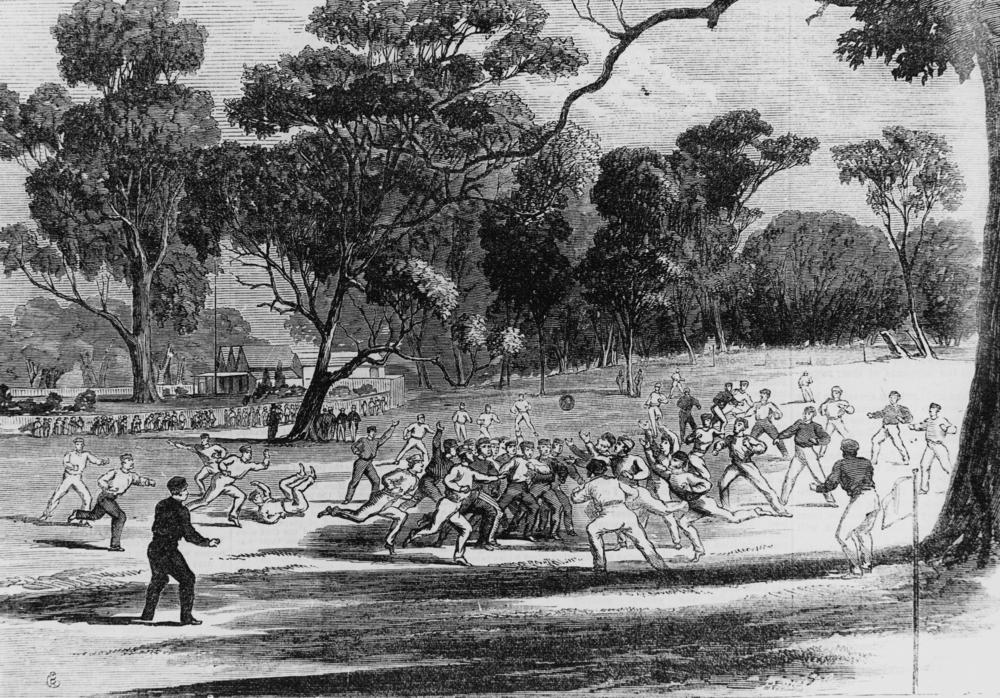
Football in the Richmond Paddock, 1860s. The field's hard playing surface influenced Wills's codification of the game.

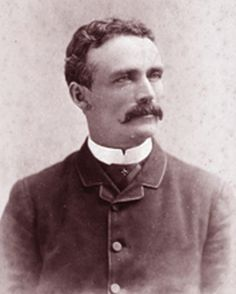
Wills's cousin H. C. A. Harrison joined him in pioneering football in 1859.

Wills was a compulsive writer to the press on cricketing matters and in the late 1850s his letters sometimes appeared on a daily basis. An agitator like his father, he used language "in the manner of a speaker declaiming forcefully from a platform". On 10 July 1858, the Melbourne-based Bell's Life in Victoria and Sporting Chronicle published a letter by Wills that is regarded as a catalyst for a new style of football, known today as Australian rules football. Titled "Winter Practice", it begins:

Now that cricket has been put aside for some few months to come, and cricketers have assumed somewhat of the chrysalis nature (for a time only 'tis true), but at length will again burst forth in all their varied hues, rather than allow this state of torpor to creep over them, and stifle their new supple limbs, why can they not, I say, form a foot-ball club, and form a committee of three or more to draw up a code of laws?

In his letter Wills wasn't confined to the idea of a football club. He also proposed that if a football club could not be formed, that young men form a rifle club to defend the colony against potential threats, closing with "Trusting that some one will take up the matter and form either of the above clubs, or, at any rate some athletic games".

In endeavouring to keep cricketers active during the off-season, Wills made the first public declaration of its kind in Australia: that football should be a regular and organised activity. Around this time he helped to foster football in Melbourne's schools. The local headmasters, his collaborators, were inspired in large part by descriptions of football in Thomas Hughes' novel Tom Brown's School Days (1857), an account of life at Rugby School under the headship of Thomas Arnold. Due to similarities between their sporting careers at Rugby, Wills has been called the "real-life embodiment" of Tom Brown, the novel's fictitious hero.

Wills's letter was alluded to two weeks after its publication in an advertisement posted by his friend, professional cricketer and publican Jerry Bryant, for a "scratch match" held adjacent to the MCG at the Richmond Paddock. The first of several kickabouts held that year involving Wills, Bryant and other Melbourne cricketers, it was described by one participant as "football Babel"; a "short code of rules" were to be drawn up afterwards, however this does not seem to have occurred. Another landmark game, played without fixed rules over three Saturdays and co-umpired by Wills and teacher Dr John Macadam, began on the same site on 7 August between forty Scotch College students and a like number from Melbourne Grammar. The two schools have since competed annually. Wills emerged as the standout figure in accounts of Melbourne football in 1858. These early experimental games were more rugby-like than anything else—low-scoring, low-to-the-ground "gladiatorial" tussles. The last recorded match of the year is the subject of the first known Australian football poem, published in Punch. Wills, the only player named, is reified as "the Melbourne chief", leading his men to victory against a side from South Yarra FC. As described in the poem, the football is a game played under rugby rules including a try culminating in the winning goal.

Following a scratch match at the start of the 1859 football season, the Melbourne Football Club officially came into being on 14 May. Three days later, Wills and three other members—Hammersley, journalist J. B. Thompson and teacher Thomas H. Smith—met near the MCG at the Parade Hotel, owned by Bryant, to devise and codify the club's rules. The men went over the rules of four English schools; Hammersley recalled Wills's preference for the Rugby game, but it was found to be confusing and too violent. Subsequently, they rejected common features such as "hacking" (shin-kicking) and produced a signed document listing ten simple rules suited to grown men and Australian conditions. Heading the list of signatories, Wills, too, saw the need for compromise. He wrote to his brother Horace: "Rugby was not a game for us, we wanted a winter pastime but men could be harmed if thrown on the ground so we thought differently." Thompson and Hammersley's promotion of the new code, together with Wills's star power, encouraged the spread of football throughout Victoria.

== Height of celebrity ==
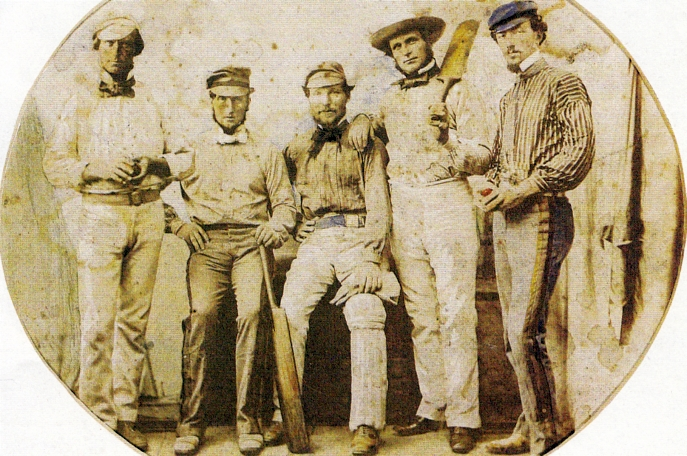
Wills (far right) with professional members of the Victoria XI, 1859. He preferred the company of professionals in an era when they were shunned by amateurs of his social stature.

After falling out with the MCC, Wills moved freely about Victoria, playing for any club of his choosing. He became president of Collingwood and vice-president of Richmond, raising the standard of the latter club's play to make it the best in the colony. There were calls to ban Wills from certain club matches, for his unexpected appearance in a side, often as a late inclusion, altered the odds to such an extent that bookmakers felt compelled to declare "all bets are off". All clubs still coveted Wills when it suited their cause, and scarcely a day passed when he did not play or practice cricket.

Wills retained the Victorian captaincy for the January 1859 intercolonial against New South Wales, held at the Domain. Despite breaking his right middle finger on day one while attempting a catch, Wills top scored in the first innings with 15* and took 5/24 and 6/25, carrying Victoria to an upset win. Later that year, he resigned from the intercolonial match committee in protest after Thompson publicly chastised him for not attending practice ahead of the next match against New South Wales. During a follow-up practice match, players struggled in the day's heat, and ignoring calls to retire, Wills suffered a near-fatal sunstroke. Hammersley wrote that Wills felt obliged to perform for the large crowd that had gathered to watch him. Over 25,000 people attended the MCG in February 1860 to see Victoria, captained by Wills, play New South Wales. Wills bowled unchanged in both innings, taking 6/23 and 3/16, and top scored with 20*. Victoria won by 69 runs.

The Melbourne media gave Wills the sobriquet "Great Gun of the Colony". A British correspondent called him "a cricketer born". The Sydney press, championing Wills as a native New South Welshman, agreed:

Tall, muscular, and slender, Mr. Wills seems moulded by nature to excel in every branch of the noble game, ... on the field we find him the admiration of the ground, while in the combination of his successes, [his teammates] recognise with pride the still more arduous duties of an unwearied and most discreet captain.

"I think the ground should be free to all, so that the captain of each side could dispose of his forces in any position he likes."

— Wills on how football should be played

Wills remained an influential figure in Australian football from 1859 to 1860. While he fought for the adoption of several Rugby School customs—such as a free kick for marking, the use of an oval-shaped ball, and (unsuccessfully) a crossbar—he pushed the game in new directions as a captain and tactician. During an 1860 match, he used positional play to exploit the code's lack of an offside law, at which point, according to James Coventry, "the full potential of the sport started to be realised".

At Wills's insistence, his cousin H. C. A. Harrison took up football in 1859, and quickly became a leading player and captain. Harrison venerated Wills, terming him "the beau-ideal of an athlete"—high praise given Harrison's status as the champion runner of Victoria. Their presence in Geelong fuelled a local craze for football and helped ensure during the game's early years the supremacy of the Geelong Football Club, which Wills captained in 1860. In an era when players moved freely among clubs, he still occasionally captained, and served on the committee of Melbourne, and in 1860, became the first captain and secretary of the Richmond Football Club (no connection with today's AFL club). The code underwent revisions around this time, principally in response to the on-field actions of dominant players. "And there were none more dominant than Wills and Harrison", writes Coventry.

== Queensland ==
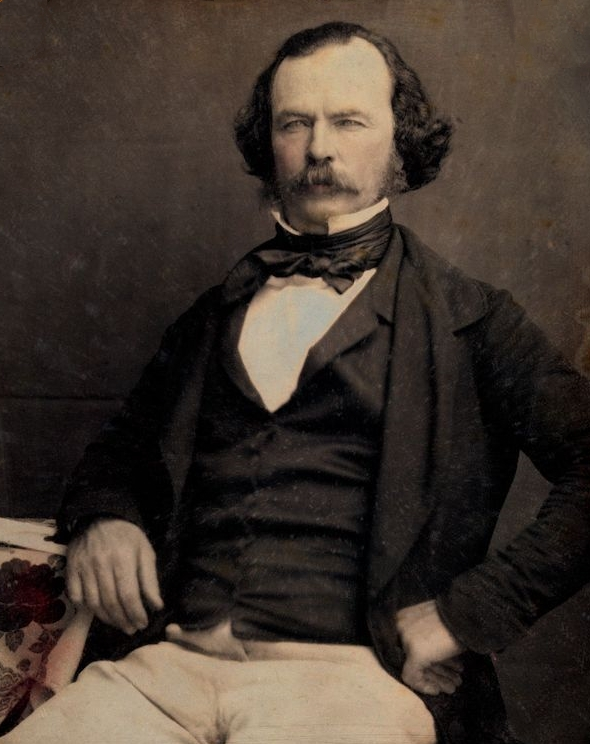
Horatio Wills

With plans underway for the first tour of Australia by an English cricket team, Wills announced his retirement from sport. At his father's beckoning, Wills agreed to leave Victoria to help found and manage a new family station, Cullin-la-ringo, on the Nogoa River in outback Queensland. He prepared for six months in country Victoria where learnt the crafts of a squatter. In his will, Horatio—showing a "deep understanding" of Tom's personality—wrote that his son would be removed from the station and receive a diminished inheritance in the event of "misconducting himself" as manager.

In January 1861, Tom, Horatio and a party of employees and their families travelled by ship to Brisbane, disembarked in Moreton Bay, and then, with livestock and supplies, set out on an eight-month trek through Queensland's rugged interior. Food was scarce and Tom hunted native game to fend off starvation. They suffered many other hardships and even death when, in Toowoomba, one of Horatio's men drowned. On the Darling Downs over 10,000 sheep were collected. Hitherto the largest group of colonists to enter the area, the Wills party drew the attention of local Aboriginal people. Wary of what he called the "perpetual war between the whites and blacks" of Central Queensland, Horatio sought to avoid conflict. The party reached Cullin-la-ringo, situated on Gayiri Aboriginal land, in early October, and proceeded to set up camp.

=== Cullin-la-ringo massacre ===
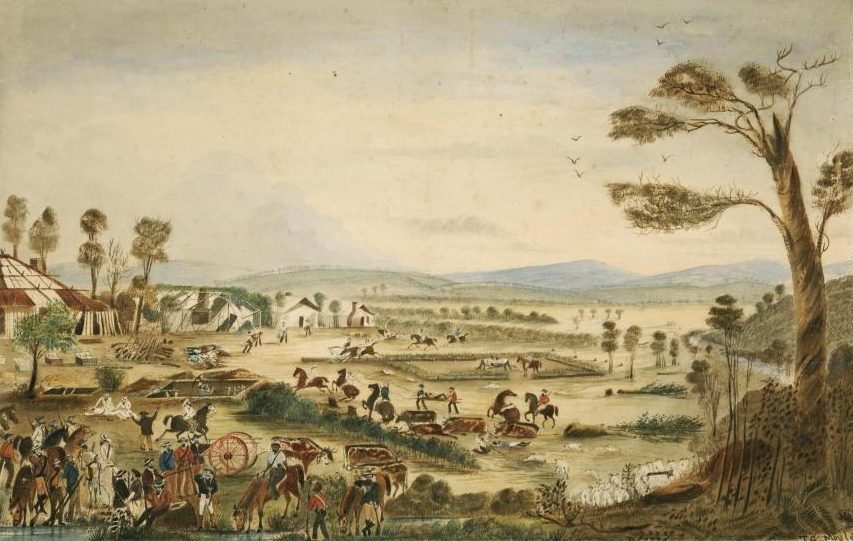
The Wills Tragedy, 1861 shows neighbouring colonists collecting and burying the dead at Cullin-la-ringo.

On 17 October, Horatio and 18 of his party died in Australia's deadliest massacre of colonists by Aboriginal people. Tom was away from the property at the time, having been sent with two stockmen to collect supplies the party left en route. He returned several days later to a scene of devastation. Despairing and vengeful, Wills first wrote to Harrison in Melbourne, listing for him the victims and requesting that he send replacements: "men that will shoot every black they see". Over the following weeks, police, native police and vigilante groups from neighbouring stations committed a series of counter-massacres; estimates of the total number of Gayiri killed range from 109 to 370.

While it is unknown whether Wills participated in these reprisals, the possibility was raised in 2021 after a report that an anonymous Chicago Tribune article, dating from 1895, quotes him as saying that, during a raid on an Aboriginal camp, he and other avengers "killed all in sight". Flanagan discredited most of the article as lurid fiction rooted in racism, but noted one passage suggesting insider knowledge, concluding it could not be dismissed outright. Also in 2021, it was disclosed that Wills family historian Terry Wills Cooke had written privately in 2005 of oral history within the family that suggested Wills joined the reprisals. Wills Cooke reversed this in 2021, stating that the oral history did not support any such involvement.

Following the massacre, conflicting reports reached the outside world and for a time it was feared that Wills had died. In the press, Horatio was accused of ignoring warnings and allowing Aboriginal people to encroach on his property. The retribution was also deemed excessive. Tom vehemently defended his father against any perceived criticism. Privately, in his letter to Harrison, he admitted, "if we had used common precaution all would have been well". It was later revealed that, prior to leaving the camp, Tom "had a sort of presentiment" and advised those remaining to arm themselves, including Horatio, who assured him "It was only his boyish fears". The Queensland press, still in the wake of the massacre, suggested that Wills, "now a Queenslander", be approached to captain the colony's cricket team.

Different reasons were put forward at the time to account for the Wills tragedy. For many colonists, it confirmed the popular belief that Aboriginal people were bloodthirsty savages. Tom never articulated his version of events in writing, but his brother Cedric wrote years later that it was an act of revenge for an attack made on local Aboriginal people by Jesse Gregson, a neighbouring squatter whom they mistook to be Horatio. Cedric quoted Tom as saying, "If the truth is ever known, you will find that it was through Gregson shooting those blacks; that was the cause of the murder."

In the years following the massacre, Wills experienced flashbacks, nightmares and an irritable heart—symptoms of what is now known as posttraumatic stress disorder. Having eagerly participated in the drinking culture of colonial sport, he increased his alcohol consumption in a likely attempt to blot out memories and alleviate sleep disturbance. Wills's sister Emily wrote of him two months after the massacre: "He says he never felt so changed in the whole course of his life".

=== Riot and expulsion ===
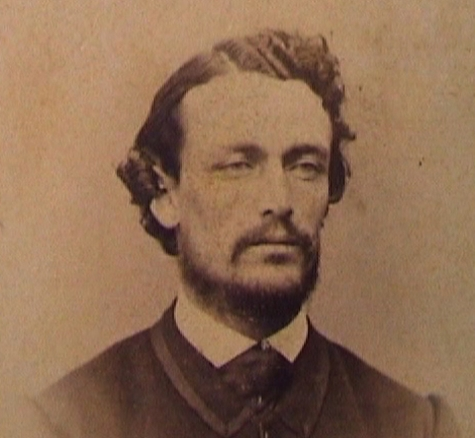
Wills, c. 1863

Wills made a vow over Horatio's grave to remain on Cullin-la-ringo and make it "the pride of Queensland"—words that, according to de Moore, "enshrined and imprisoned" Tom as the new head of the family. He began to rebuild the station pending the arrival of his uncle-in-law, William Roope, who took control of Cullin-la-ringo in December 1861, but soon left due to Wills's "exceedingly ill" treatment of him. Hypervigilant, Wills slept only three hours a night with a rifle within reach and watched for signs of another Aboriginal attack. Bushrangers and wildlife also posed threats, and for several weeks "sandy blight" left him half-blind. Short of station hands, he at times led the solitary life of a shepherd. "There is no one up here to love old Tom but the gum trees and the little lambs", he wrote to his mother.

He went to Sydney in January 1863 to captain Victoria against New South Wales on the Domain. A run out dispute led to Wills's decision to abandon play. A crowd riot ensued, with the "cabbage tree mob" stoning and beating the Victorians with sticks; Wills received a "severe blow" in the face from a stone before escaping the ground with his men under police escort. Despite this, and with only a nine-man batting order due to William Greaves and George Marshall having fled the city, Wills agreed to resume play the next day. He took 8 wickets and top scored in both innings (25* and 17*), but it was not enough to secure victory. The Melbourne media castigated Wills for allowing the game to resume, and Sydneysiders called him a turncoat for reneging on an earlier promise to play for New South Wales. He denied all accusations and wrote in an angry letter to The Sydney Herald: "I for one do not think that Victoria will ever send an Eleven up here again." Back in Victoria, he became engaged to Julie Anderson, a squatter's daughter. He seems to have done so to meet familial expectations. Even so, he was chided by his siblings for prioritising cricket over courtship. In May, as his mother grew concerned over his neglect of Cullin-la-ringo, Wills extended his sojourn south to play football in Geelong.

Wills finally returned to Queensland in May and was sworn in as a Justice of the Peace upon arrival in Brisbane. Over the next few months at Cullin-la-ringo, he reported to the press at least three fatal Aboriginal attacks on local colonists, a shepherd of his numbering among the victims. He accosted government officials for failing to send a native police detachment to his station for protection, and scorned city-dwellers for sympathising with the plight of Aboriginal people in the Nogoa region. With the cricket season approaching, Wills agreed to captain Queensland against New South Wales, and then left the colony to lead a Victoria XXII at the MCG against George Parr's All-England Eleven. In awe of his 1,800 mile dash across the continent to play cricket, the English thought it a madman's journey. Wills arrived on the final day of the match to a rapturous reception, and went in as a substitute fielder. He then joined the visitors on their Victorian tour.

The 1863–64 season saw Wills's engagement to Anderson collapse, possibly due to his womanising, and the trustees of Cullin-la-ringo accused him of mismanaging the property, in part by squandering family finances on alcohol while claiming it as station expenditure. They demanded that he stay in Victoria to answer for the property's runaway debt. In response, Wills left Australia to join Parr's XI on a month-long tour of New Zealand. Initially standing in as umpire, he went on to captain local teams against the English, and filled the same role for a Victoria XXII at the end of the tour in Melbourne. He faced the trustees soon after. With his mother's reluctant approval, they dismissed him from Cullin-la-ringo, thus fulfilling the premonition in Horatio's will.

== Return to Victoria ==
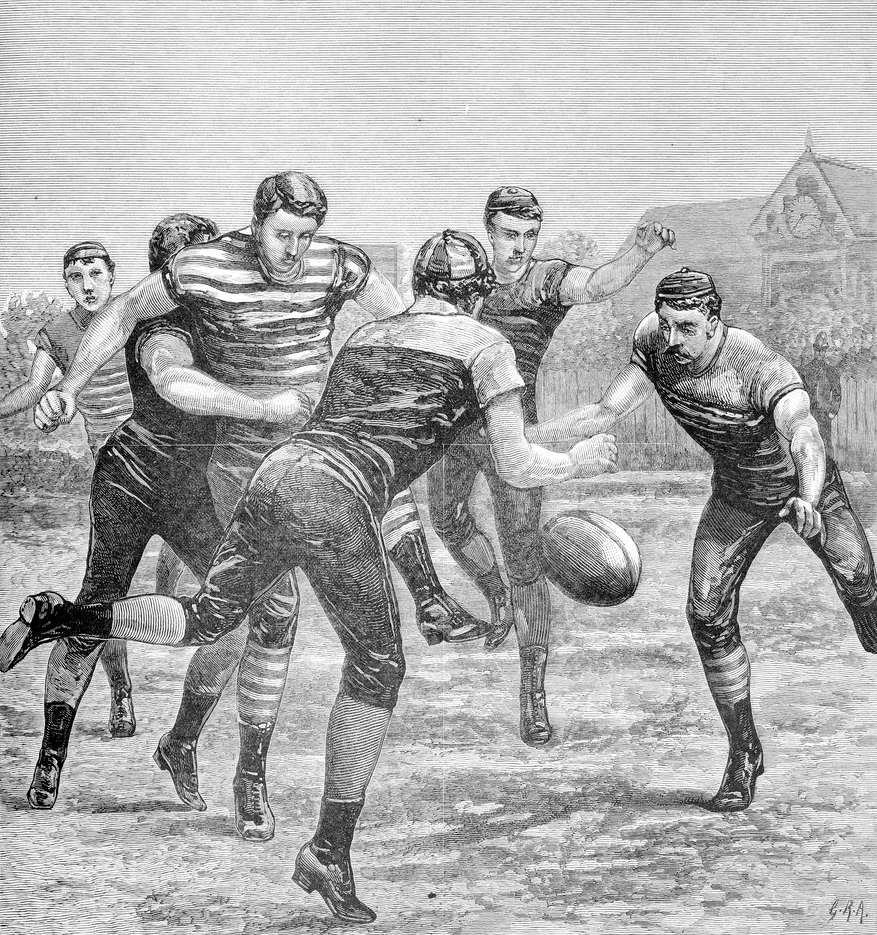
Football match between Geelong and Melbourne. The two clubs fought over which side "owned" Wills.

Wills moved to the family home in Geelong. Always a black sheep of sorts, he became increasingly estranged from his mother and sister Emily from this point on. Family letters from mid-1864 reveal that Wills had a "wife"—a "bad woman", according to Emily. It is likely a reference to the already-married Sarah Barbor (née Duff). Born in Dublin, she is a mysterious figure, but is known to have remained Wills's lifelong partner. The de facto nature of their relationship, and even Barbor's existence, were probably kept secret from Wills's mother for a number of years.

Throughout the 1865 football season, Wills played for and served on the committees of Melbourne and Geelong, then the game's most powerful clubs. At the end of a winter beset with public brawls over which team "owned" him, Wills moved to Geelong for the remainder of his career, prompting Bell's Life in Victoria to report that Melbourne had lost "the finest leader of men on the football field". The following year, when the running bounce and other rules were formalised at a meeting of club delegates under Harrison's chairmanship, Wills was not present; his move to Geelong had cut him off from the rule-making process in Melbourne.

Intercolonials between Victoria and New South Wales resumed at the MCG on Boxing Day 1865, nearly three years since the Sydney riot. Sam Cosstick, William Caffyn and other Victorian professionals defected to the rival colony due to pay disputes with the MCC. Wills, leading the weakened Victorian side to an against-the-odds win, took 6 wickets and contributed 58—the first half century in Australian first-class cricket—to 285, a record intercolonial total. Allegations that Wills cheated his way to victory failed to endanger his status as a folk hero and "a source of eternal hope" for Victoria.

== Aboriginal cricket team ==
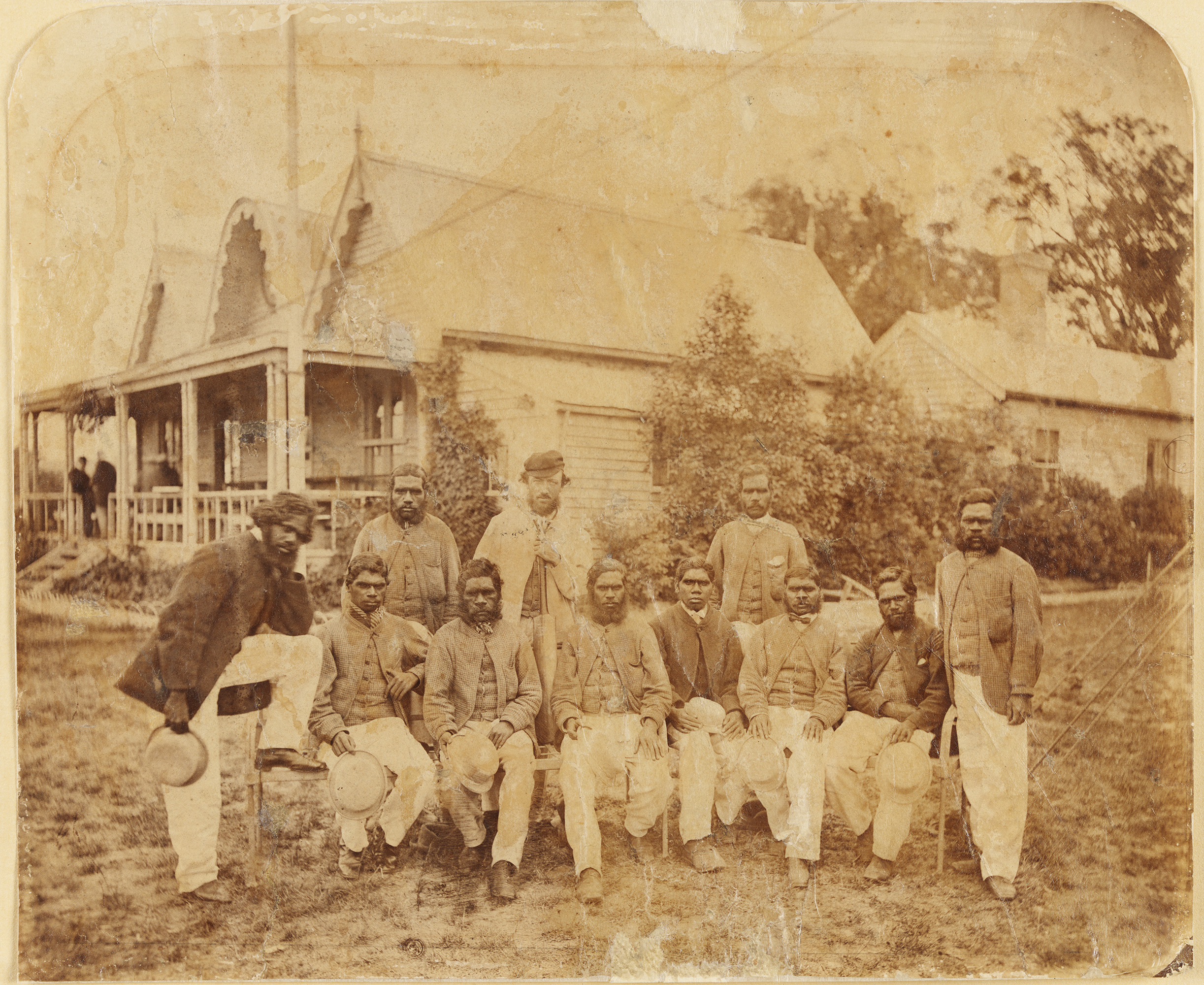
Wills (back row, center) with the Aboriginal XI outside the MCC pavilion of the MCG, December 1866

In May 1866, plans were made by the MCC to host and play against an Aboriginal team from Victoria's Western District. The motive behind the match, set for Boxing Day of that year, was a financial one, and in August, Wills agreed to coach the Aboriginal players. Wills's reasons for accepting the role remain a mystery, but a growing need for money likely influenced his decision. The enterprise was to mark the beginning of his transition from amateur to professional sportsman.

Wills travelled inland in November to gather the players from Edenhope and Harrow, where they worked as station hands. One of their employers, William Hayman, had helped train them in cricket over the preceding few years, and acted as the team's manager and "protector". Mostly Jardwadjali men, they shared common vocabulary with the neighbouring Djab wurrung people, which enabled Wills to coach them in the Aboriginal language he learnt as a child. From their training ground at Lake Wallace, Wills, in a "tactical strike", boasted to the Melbourne press of the Aboriginal players' skills, especially the batsmanship of Unamurriman, commonly known as Mullagh.^{[d]} Unsettled by Wills's claims, the MCC strengthened the ranks of its Boxing Day side with non-members. This drew widespread criticism, and public sympathy was with the Aboriginal players when they arrived in Melbourne in late December. Over 10,000 spectators went to the MCG to see them play. Captained by Wills, they lost against the MCC's reinforced side, but won unanimous praise for their performance. Wills afterwards accused the MCC of "treachery".

The team provoked much public discussion over past mistreatment of Aboriginal people and future relations between the races. It is unknown what Wills and his Aboriginal teammates made of these broader social and political dimensions of the enterprise. Some of Wills's contemporaries were shocked that he would associate with Aboriginal people in the shadow of his father's death. Others, such as this contributor to The Empire, addressed him as a hero:

Although you may not be fully aware of the fact, allow me to tell you that you have rendered a greater service to the aboriginal races of this country and to humanity, than any man who has hitherto attempted to uphold the title of the blacks to rank amongst men.

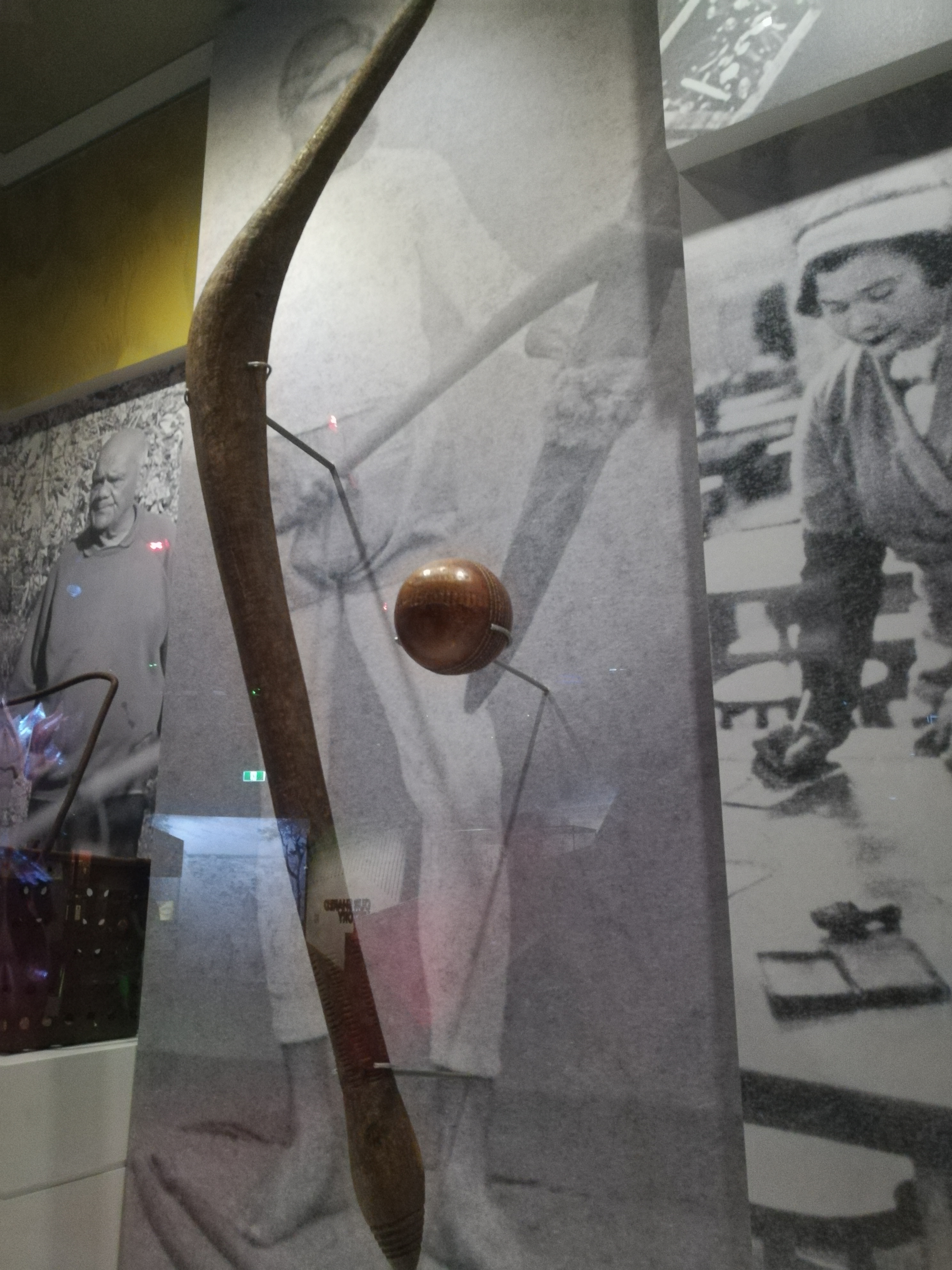
A waddy owned by Dick-a-Dick (Jungunjinuke) next to a cricket ball owned by Wills, Melbourne Museum

Wills's role took on a symbolic significance: supporters and critics alike used his status as a 'native' (Australian-born colonist) to identify him with his 'native' (Indigenous) teammates, and he was also noted for speaking in "their own lingo". Jellico (Murrumgunarriman), the "team jester", joked to the press: "[Wills] too much along of us. He speak nothing now but blackfellow talk". While Melburnians were enthralled by Wills and the Aboriginal team, the annual intercolonial between Victoria and New South Wales—usually the season highlight—failed to excite public interest, and Victoria's loss in Sydney was partly attributed to Wills's absence. The Aboriginal players improved as they toured Victoria under his captaincy in January. After an easy win in Geelong, Wills took the team to "Belle Vue" to meet his mother. Back in Melbourne, two members, Bullocky (Bullenchanach) and Cuzens (Yellana), joined Wills in representing Victoria against a Tasmanian XVI.

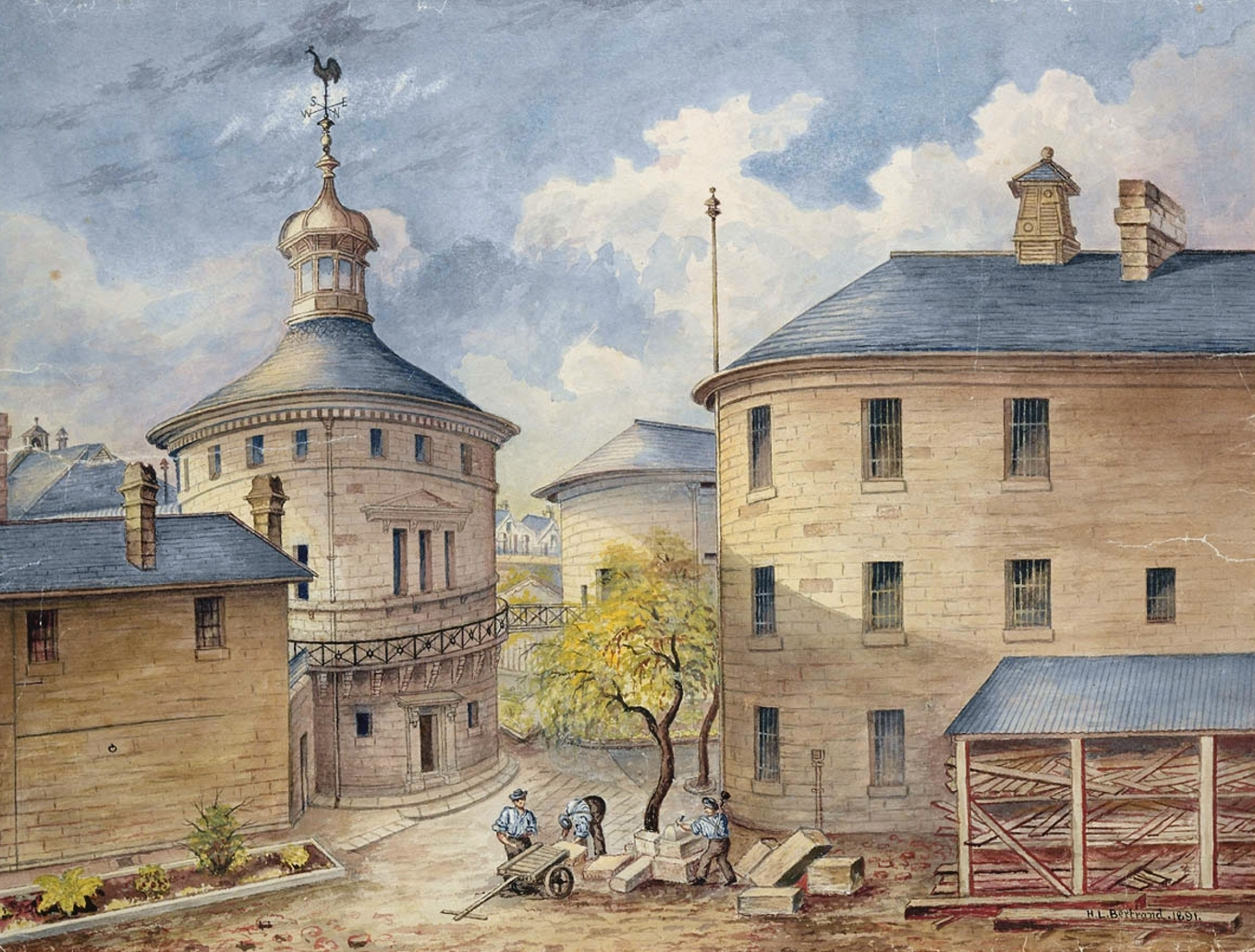
Wills's stint in Darlinghurst Gaol following his on-field arrest marked the decline of his role within the team.

In February 1867, they went to Sydney to begin an intercolonial and overseas tour. Aware of the tour's lucrative potential, New South Wales captain Charles Lawrence sought to work his way into the team, first by inviting them to stay at his Manly Beach hotel. When they played against his club at the Albert Ground in Redfern, policemen brought the game to an abrupt halt by entering the field and arresting Wills. He and W. E. B. Gurnett, the tour promoter, had been vying to take over as manager, and Wills ended up in Darlinghurst Gaol for a breach of contract. Within days of his release in March, Gurnett embezzled some of the funds and left the team stranded in Sydney, dashing any hopes of a trip overseas and confirming Wills's suspicion that he was a con artist. Lawrence set up a "benefit" match for the team and joined them on their travels outside Sydney. By the end of the New South Wales leg of the tour, he had usurped Wills as captain.

No longer attracting significant crowds or media attention, they returned to the Western District in May; Lawrence stayed with the team while Wills went to Geelong to play football. It has been said that, due to his drinking habit, Wills exercised a "bad influence" upon the players, four of whom died from illness during or soon after the tour; the inquest into one death, that of Watty (Bilvayarrimin), and a follow-up police report found evidence of alcohol abuse among the players.

The surviving members formed part of the Aboriginal XI which Lawrence took to England in 1868, making it the first Australian sports team to travel overseas. Wills resented Lawrence for reviving the team without him; his exclusion from the landmark tour has been called the tragedy of his sporting career.

== Ambiguous professional ==
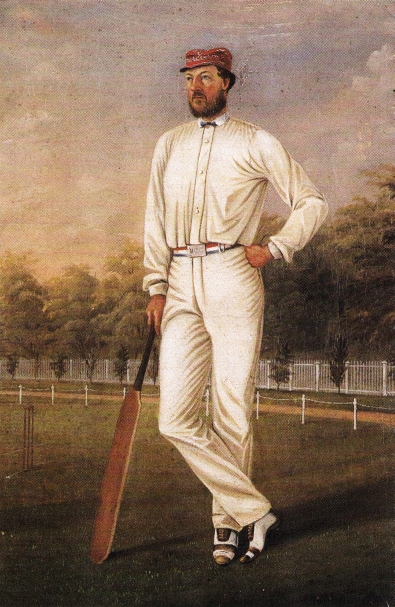
Portrait of Wills in the colours of the MCC (William Handcock, 1870, National Sports Museum collection)

Without career prospects beyond sport, Wills joined the MCC as a professional at the start of the 1867–68 season; however, he was not openly referred to as such. Instead, the club devised the title of 'tutor' in order that he maintain the prestige of his amateur background.

Played on the MCG, the December 1867 intercolonial between Victoria and New South Wales ended in a sound victory for the former, principally due to Wills's nine-wicket haul and Richard Wardill's century. Wills had been Victoria's preferred captain for over a decade. Writing in his sports column, Hammersley claimed that, as a paid cricketer, Wills lacked "moral ascendancy" over amateurs. When he lost the captaincy to Wardill, an amateur, on the eve of the March 1869 match against New South Wales, he refused to play under him, or, indeed, anyone else. The Victorians condemned Wills and resolved to go on without him, after which he retracted his decision not to play. This was the last intercolonial played on the Domain and Victoria recovered from Wardill's diamond duck to win by 78 runs. Wills scalped 7 wickets in a single innings.

After the intercolonial, Wills announced that he would not play for Victoria again, even if the colony wanted him. He planned to return to Cullin-la-ringo in early 1869, but his mother, still "very dissatisfied" with him, requested that he stay away from the station. The MCC took him back and he continued to act as a tutor with the club. Wills's former Aboriginal teammates, Mullagh and Cuzens, joined him at the MCC as paid bowlers.

Wills's physical appearance had deteriorated; gaining weight, balding and generally unkempt, with "an alcoholic blush of his cheeks", he looked older than his years. Describing his body as "stiff" during a cricket match in 1870, he hinted, for the first time, that his talent was fading. Nevertheless, his reputation as Australia's preeminent cricketer remained intact, with one journalist writing:

The veteran "Tommy Wills" has long been acknowledged to be at all points the most accomplished cricketer Australia has ever seen. He is the best general out to captain a team; no man is more difficult to send from the wickets; ... and until lately his bowling was among the most difficult as well as the most killing.

== No-ball plot and downfall ==
For Mr. Wills to no-ball Mr. Wardill for throwing is like Satan reproving sin.

— Hammersley, writing for The Australasian on Wills's umpiring of an intercolonial match

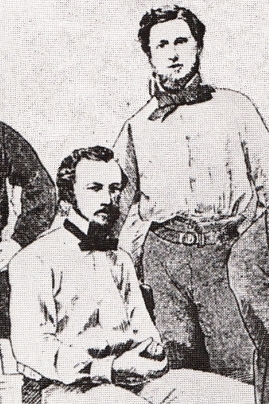
Hammersley (standing), The Australasian's chief sportswriter, led a campaign to have Wills (seated) banned from intercolonial cricket.

Hardly a year had passed since Wills's return to Australia in 1856 without public comment on his suspect bowling action. Such comments increased as he aged and turned professional, and by 1870, many former allies that had once colluded to protect him, including journalists and officials, accused him of deliberately throwing. Wills's fame and influence helped make him a "convenient caricature" of the cricketing villain, one that, his critics urged, ought to be no-balled for the good of the game in the colonies.

In February 1870 at the MCG, Wills captained Victoria to a 265-run win over a New South Wales side featuring Twopenny (Jarrawuk), an Aboriginal paceman allegedly recruited by Lawrence as a foil to Wills's "chucks". Comparing the two, the Melbourne press surmised: "Undoubtedly Wills throws sometimes, but there is some decency about it, some disguise." In March, Victoria trounced a Tasmanian XVI in Launceston under Wills's leadership, though not without criticism of his bowling action. Amid accusations that Wills had incited a "plague" of throwing in Australia, one-time ally Hammersley, now Melbourne's foremost sportswriter, emerged as his harshest critic. He accused Wills of resorting to throwing to maintain pace as he aged, and criticised him for introducing a type of bouncer designed to injure and intimidate batsmen. The Australasian, Hammersley's newspaper, summarised Wills's modus operandi: "If I cannot hit your wicket or make you give a chance soon, I'll hit you and hurt you if I can. I'll frighten you out."

In the face of a looming crisis in his career, Wills admitted to throwing in his 1870–71 Australian Cricketers' Guide, and in so doing taunted his enemies to stop him. Nonetheless, he went on to captain Victoria in the March 1871 intercolonial against New South Wales, held at the Albert Ground. Wills's first innings top score of 39* was offset by his drunken behaviour in the field, and he seemed reluctant to bowl for fear of being called. Victoria won by 48 runs. Not long after, Wills was no-balled for throwing for the first time in a club match. Rumour soon spread that the opposing club's owner had conspired with the umpire against Wills.

A series of superb club cricket performances in February 1872—including a single innings ten-wicket haul for 9 runs against St Kilda—removed any doubt that Wills would play for Victoria in the next intercolonial against New South Wales, scheduled for March on the MCG. Before the game, representatives from both colonies met and entered into a bilateral agreement designed to call Wills. When he opened the bowling, Wills became the first cricketer to be called for throwing in a top-class Australian match. The umpire called him two more times in two overs, and he did not bowl again. He was again no-balled when a Victorian side under his captaincy lost to a combined XIII from New South Wales, Tasmania and South Australia late in 1872.

Hammersley had seemingly triumphed in his campaign to have Wills banned from intercolonial cricket. In an exchange of personal attacks in the press, Wills implied that Hammersley was an architect of the no-ball plot, and protested that he and other English colonists were out to oppress native-born Australians. Wills went on to threaten him with legal action. Hammersley closed:

You are played out now, the cricketing machine is rusty and useless, all respect for it is gone. You will never be captain of a Victorian Eleven again, ... Eschew colonial beer, and take the pledge, and in time your failings may be forgotten, and only your talents as a cricketer remembered. Farewell, Tommy Wills.

== Grace and comeback attempt ==
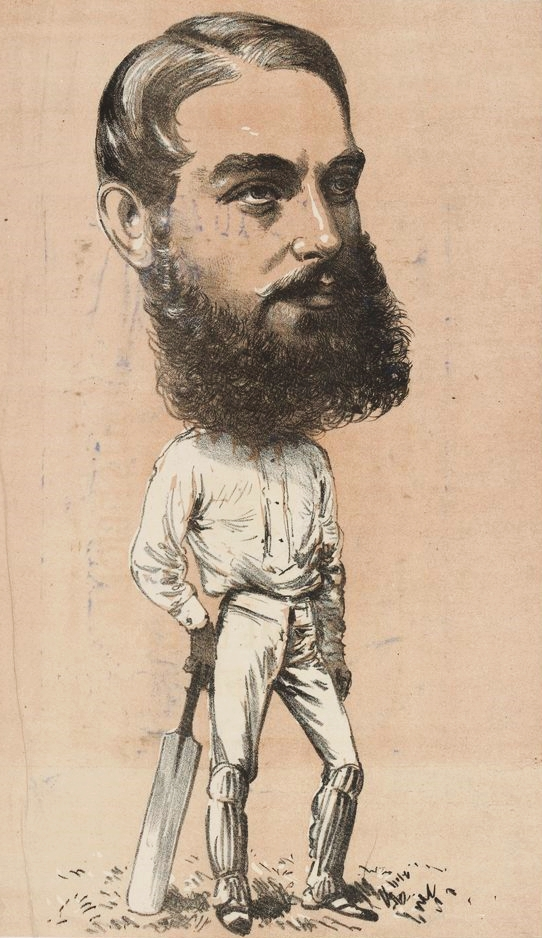
An 1873 caricature of W. G. Grace. In his obituaries, Wills was referred to as "the Grace of Australia".

W. G. Grace, the Victorian era's most famous cricketer, brought an English team to Australia in 1873–74. Wills strove to play for Victoria against Grace and rival factions fought over his possible inclusion. Hammersley, a selector, ensured that he missed out. Wills went on to tour with, and play against the Englishmen. Irked by Wills's constant presence, Grace remarked that he seemed to regard himself as a representative of the whole of Australia. It was assumed that, on his homeward journey, Grace would play a final match in the South Australian capital of Adelaide, but he bypassed the city when Kadina, a remote mining town in the Copper Triangle, offered him more money. Wills coached Kadina's miners and captained them against Grace's XI. Played in an open, rock-strewn plain of baked earth, the game was deemed a farce. Wills made a pair and Grace later wrote of the "old Rugbeian" as a has-been. Grace neglected to mention that Wills bowled him, ending with 6/28.

In Geelong, Wills was still idolised, though he seemed discontented, seeking any chance to earn money through cricket in the major cities. He maintained an interest in the development of football, what he called "the king of games". He continued to suggest rule changes, such as the push in the back rule to curb injuries, and, as captain of Geelong, helped shape the sport's playing style. Utilising the speed and skill of Geelong's young players, Wills devised an innovative game plan—what he called "scientific football"—based on passing and running into open space. He pioneered another tactical manoeuvre in Ballarat by ordering his men to flood the backline to prevent the home side from scoring. Having enraged the crowd, he and his men incited them further by wasting time and deliberately kicking the ball out of bounds. A few years later, in a rare act of diplomacy, Wills quelled tensions after a rival club used his "unchivalrous tactics" against Geelong. He played his last football game in 1874.

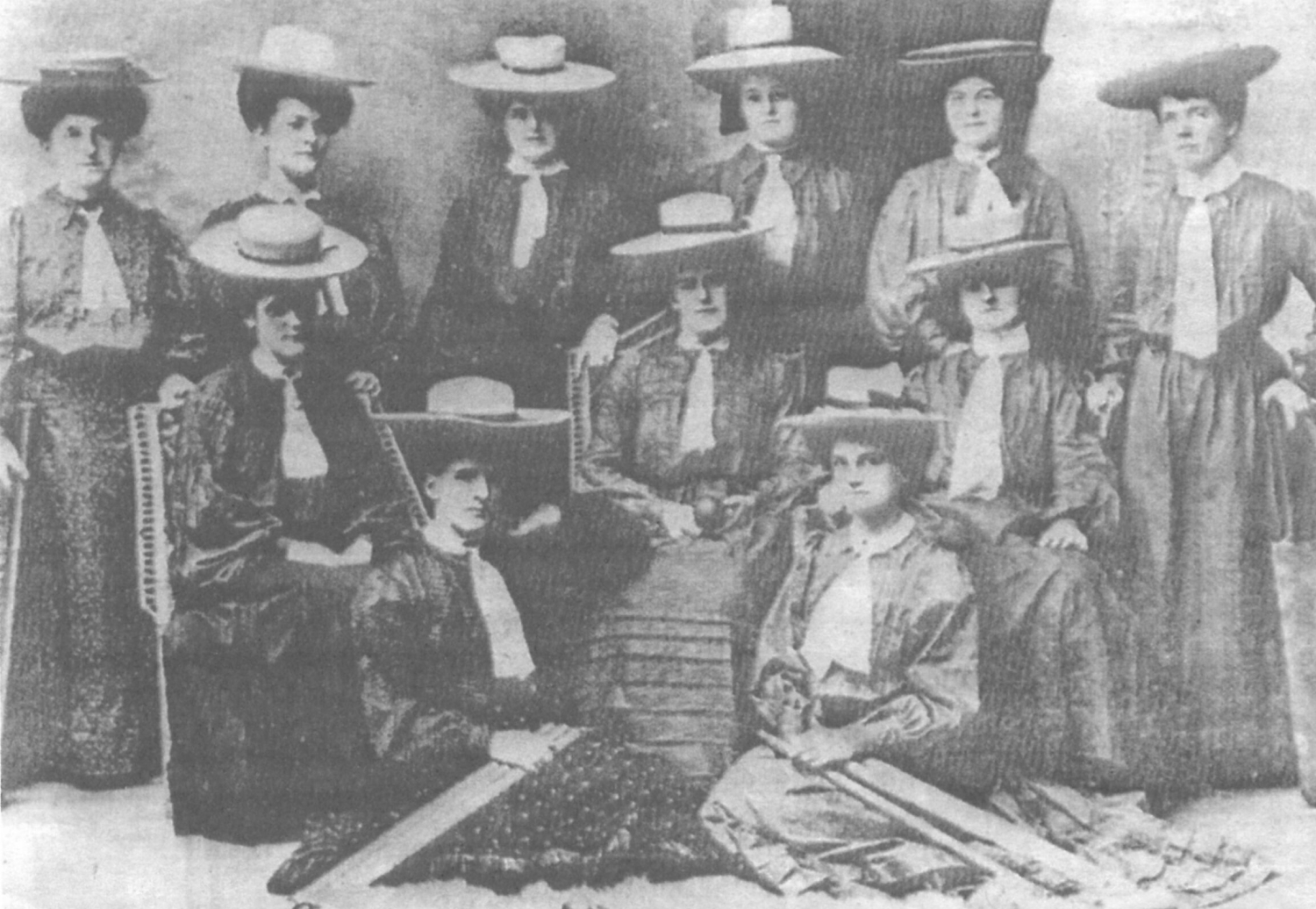
The 1874 women's cricket team from Bendigo. Wills's endorsement of the team was at odds with the mockery and scorn they faced from the Melbourne press.

In April 1874, Australia's first organised women's cricket match took place in Bendigo, Victoria between two local sides, in aid of charity. One year later, they made offers to play in Melbourne, but these were declined amid abuse from the city's press, with one journalist stating: "Public sentiment appears to be so far from approving it, that the eccentric example of the [Bendigo team] is not likely to be followed elsewhere." In response, and as secretary of Corio, Wills invited the team to play in Geelong. He was the only person in the colonies to extend such an invitation, and attempted to organise a local women's team to play them. Due to poor weather, the match was postponed until 1876, but by then, the Bendigo side had folded. Another decade would pass before women's cricket gained traction and recognition in Australia.

After Wills's ejection from top-class cricket in 1872, the Victoria XI suffered three straight losses against New South Wales. In his 1874–75 Australian Cricketers' Guide, Wills argued that Victoria needed a new captain. "No one reading his words could mistake its intent—what Victoria needed was Tom Wills", writes de Moore. For the first time in years, Wills was shortlisted by Victorian selectors to appear in the next intercolonial against New South Wales. Noting his faded skills and sullied reputation, the Melbourne press lamented, "There is some sentimental notion afloat that as a captain he is peerless." Pessimism gave way to hope as Wills promised to restore the colony's glory, and in February 1876 he led the Victoria XI onto the Albert Ground. Batting last in the order, he went for 0 and 4 and failed to take a wicket despite bowling the most overs of his side. The media blamed him for Victoria's 195-run loss. In turn, he blamed his teammates.

== Final years ==
By 1877, Wills's cricket career "had become a series of petty disputes in petty games" of "ever-deteriorating standards." No longer an office-bearer with Corio, he moved amongst lower-level clubs in the Geelong area, earning scraps of money wherever he could. In a brief postscript to one of several rejected applications for employment at the MCC, Wills wrote of old cricketers being "left in the cold". De Moore interpreted it as an "unmistakable backhander for the club". He continues: "To see Wills simply as a beggar would be to misunderstand him."

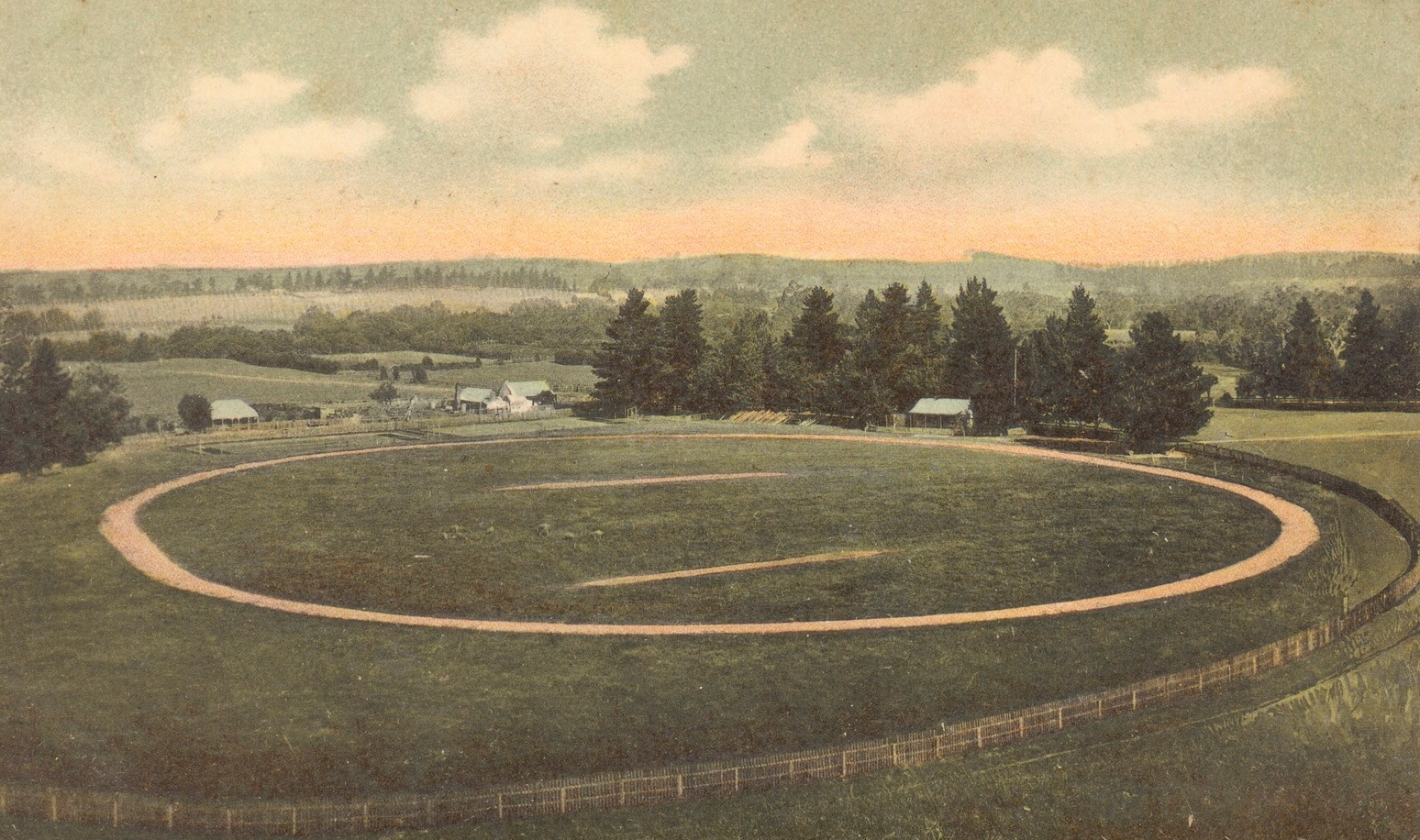
The oval in rural Heidelberg near which Wills lived and where he played his last cricket.

After retiring as a footballer, Wills turned to umpiring and committee work, and despite his continued slide into debt, donated money and trophies for football competitions. He served as Geelong's vice-president from 1873 to 1876, and briefly as club delegate after the 1877 formation of the Victorian Football Association (VFA), but was dropped for unknown reasons. During the 1878 VFA season, he acted as central umpire, and defended his adjudication of a June match between Carlton and Albert Park in what would be his last public letter. That year, Wills, broke and hounded by creditors, began selling land in Geelong to help clear his debt, and moved with Barbor to South Melbourne. He held no positions of power at the South Melbourne Cricket Club and only occasionally appeared in local team lists. He did however convince the club to open its ground to football in winter as a means of improving the turf's durability. Other clubs soon followed South Melbourne's example as football adapted to an oval-shaped field in the late 1870s. By this stage, the sport had spread throughout Australasia with Melbourne matches attracting the world's largest football crowds yet seen.

In late 1878, the MCC rejected Wills's last application for employment, and his dwindling income from cricket was "finally asphyxiated". From February 1879 onwards, Wills lived with Barbor in Heidelberg, a small village on the margins of Melbourne. Although his life that year went largely unrecorded, he is known to have made only two trips outside of Heidelberg; on one of these, in January 1880, Tom Horan spotted him in the crowd at the MCG during an intercolonial between Victoria and New South Wales. His alcoholism worsened over this period, as did Barbor's, also a heavy drinker. He occasionally coached the Heidelberg Cricket Club, its members composed mostly of farmers. On 13 March 1880, he played for the side against the Bohemians—a "travelling circus" of wealthy amateurs—in his last game. Wills took five wickets, his "chucks" working "sweetly" on the rough pitch. In his last surviving letters, sent two days later to his brothers on Cullin-la-ringo, he wrote that he felt "out of the world" in Heidelberg, and fantasised about escaping to Tasmania. Begging for money to help pay off debts, he promised, "I will not trouble any of you again".

=== Suicide ===
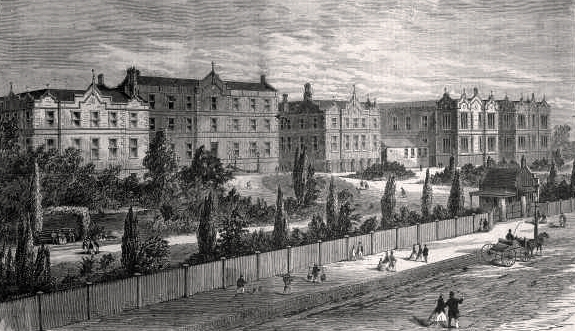
Wills fled the Melbourne Hospital within hours of his admission.

Isolated and estranged from most of his family, Wills had become, in the words of cricket historian David Frith, "a complete and dangerous and apparently incurable alcoholic". Oft-repeated stories that Wills ended up in gaol or at Kew Asylum near the end of his life are not supported by substantive evidence. He and Barbor abruptly stopped drinking on 28 April 1880; it is presumed that they ran out of money to buy more alcohol. Two days later, Wills started to show signs of alcohol withdrawal, and on 1 May, Barbor, fearing that a calamity was at hand, admitted him to the Melbourne Hospital, where a physician treated him for delirium tremens. Later that night, Wills absconded, returned home and the next day, in the grip of paranoid delusions, committed suicide by stabbing a pair of scissors into his heart three times. The inquest, on 3 May, presided over by coroner Richard Youl, found that Wills "killed himself when of unsound mind from excessive drinking".

His burial took place the next day in an unmarked grave in Heidelberg Cemetery at a private funeral attended by only six people: his brother Egbert, sister Emily and cousin Harrison; Harrison's sister Adela and her son Amos; and cricketer Verney Cameron, who later ran an unsuccessful fundraiser for a tombstone over the grave. When asked by a journalist about her late son, Elizabeth Wills denied that Tom ever existed, and, according to family lore, she never spoke of him again.^{[e]}

== Personality ==
Wills struck his contemporaries as peculiar and at times narcissistic, with a prickly temperament, but also kind, charismatic and companionable. Often embroiled in controversy, he seemed to lack an understanding of how his words and actions could repeatedly get him into trouble. His obsession with sport was such that he showed little interest in anything else. Through his research, journalist Martin Flanagan concluded that Wills was "utterly bereft of insight into himself", and football historian Gillian Hibbins described him as "an overbearing and undisciplined young man who tended to blame others for his troubles and was more interested in winning a game than in respecting sporting rules." Wills's family and peers, though angered by his misbehaviour, frequently forgave him. It seems unlikely that he sought popular favour, but his strong egalitarian streak helped make him a folk hero. This widespread affection for him, coupled with an understanding of his waywardness, found expression in colonial mottoes and drinking songs, one sung in part: "I have a weakness, I confess — it is for Tommy Wills".

While his manner of speech was breezy and laconic, Wills, as a young adult back in Australia, developed a peculiar stream of consciousness style of writing that sometimes defied syntax and grammar. His letters are laced with puns, oblique classical and Shakespearean allusions, and droll asides, such as this one about Melbourne in a letter to his brother Cedric: "Everything is dull here, but people are kept alive by people getting shot at in the streets". The overall impression is one of "a mind full of energy and histrionic ideas without a centre".

He could be dismissive, triumphant and brazen all within a single sentence. Whatever his inner world was, he rarely let it be known. Lines of argument or considered opinion were not developed. His stream of thought was in rapid flux and a string of defiant jabs. To give emphasis he underlined his words with a flourish. His punctuation was idiosyncratic. Language was breathless and explosive and he revelled in presenting himself and his motives as mysterious.

— Greg de Moore

In one of his borderline "thought disordered" letters, it is evident that at times he entered a state of depersonalisation: "I do not know what I am standing on ... when anyone speaks to me I cannot for the life of me make out what they are talking about—everything seems so curious." In 1884, Hammersley compared Wills's incipient madness and fiery glare to that of Adam Lindsay Gordon,^{[f]} the Australian bush poet. Wills's mental instability is a source for speculation: epilepsy has been suggested as a possible cause of his perplexed mental state, and a variant of bipolar illness may account for his disjointed thinking and flowery, confused writings.

In 1923, the MCC discovered Wills's old cricket cap and put it on display in the Block Arcade, prompting Horace Wills to reflect: "My brother was the nicest man I ever met. Though his nature was care-free, amounting almost to wildness, he had the sweetest temper I have seen in a man, and was essentially a sportsman."

== Playing style and captaincy ==
'Great' athletes seem to be anointed every day; far rarer are those entitled to be considered 'original'. Tom Wills is such a figure in every respect.

— Gideon Haigh

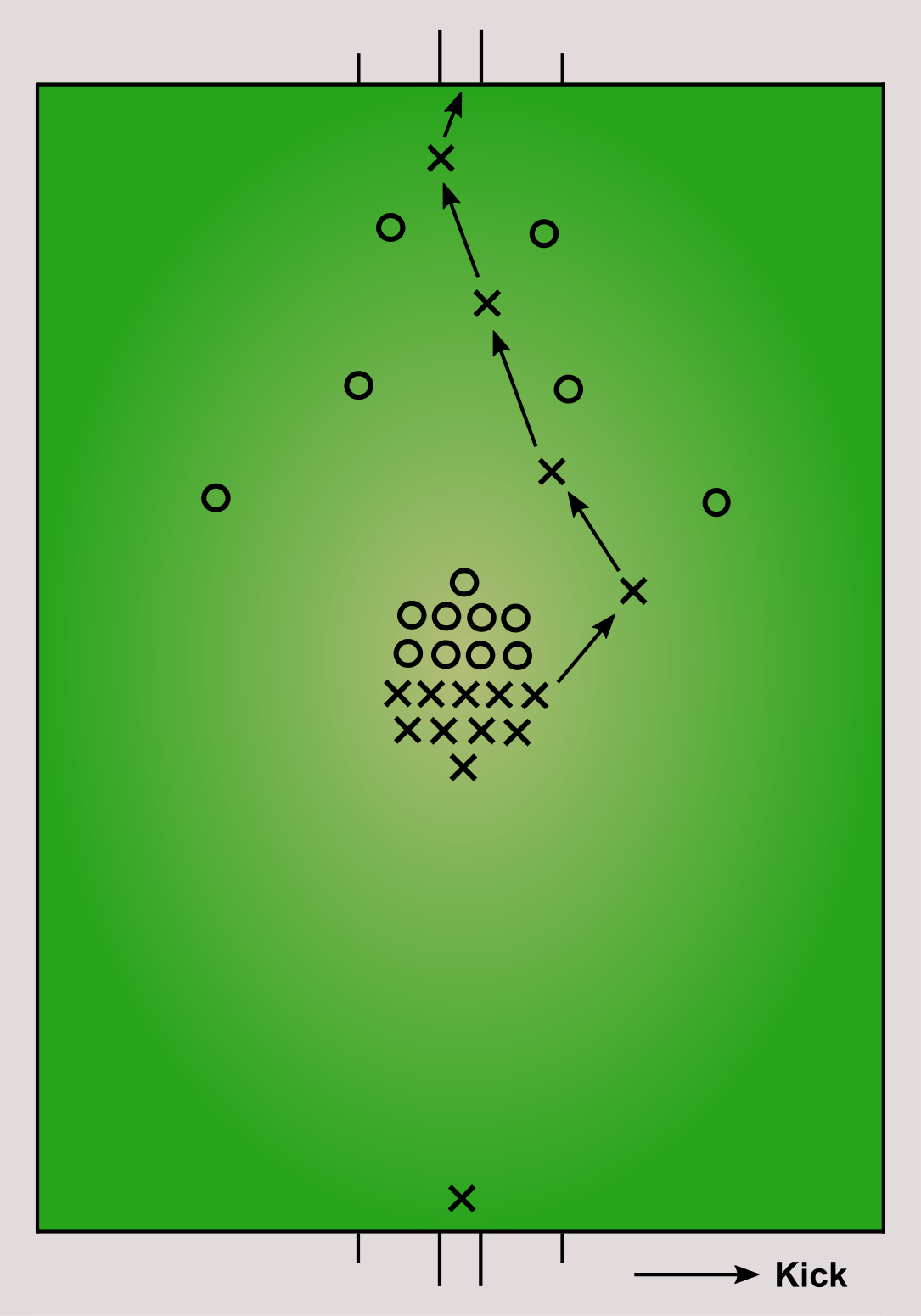
Wills's 1860 "coup de main" has been described as "arguably the most important and influential tactical manoeuvre in the history of Australian football".

Wills is regarded as Australia's first outstanding cricketer. "The picture of the athlete" in his prime, "full to overflowing with animal vigor", Wills seemed indestructible. Match reports refer to him as a Triton, a Colossus, "and many other things besides a cricketer". Intensely competitive, his win-at-all-costs mentality undermined the amateur ideal of friendly competition, as did his strategic use of intimidation. A natural leader, his supreme confidence emboldened those around him, and he never despaired the fortunes of his side, even in the face of probable defeat. On the off-chance that he sought another player's opinion, he invariably followed his own mind, and his resources at any critical juncture in a match were said to be always clever, and sometimes unique. "As a judge of the game he never had a superior", wrote Britain's The Sportsman. He was "at once a cricket crank and genius", according to The Bulletin. The rarity of Wills's genius drew comparisons to William Shakespeare's.

With furious bowling Wills assails
His rivals, and knocks o'er their bails;
His ball comes like a stone,
From some huge catapulta hurled,
In sieges of that earlier world
You read of as a boy, ...

— Melbourne Punch, 1858

Classified as an all-rounder, Wills saw himself principally as a bowler. With a repertoire spanning "sparklers, rippers, fizzers, trimmers and shooters", he varied his pace and style in order to quickly work out a batsman's weak points. Noted for his deceptive slow deliveries, dropping mid-flight and big on break, Wills's fast round arm balls sometimes reared head-high from the pitch, terrorising his opponent. His bowling was said to have "the devil" in it at times; English batsman Sir David Serjeant remembered Wills as the only bowler he ever feared. In order to avoid being no-balled for throwing, Wills carefully studied the umpire, and developed various tricks, such as worrying aloud that he might be overstepping the crease at the point of delivery. With the umpire's attention diverted to his feet, Wills would "let go a throw for all he was worth". His most flagrant throws were likened to that of a baseball pitcher.

As a batsman, Wills was an unapologetic stonewaller with a "peculiarly ugly" style; his characteristic shots—cuts and to the leg side—ensured the primacy of defence. He summarised his technique thus: "The ball can't get through the bat." He could also abruptly turn explosive and, according to one sportswriter, hit as hard as Tom Sayers. On one occasion at the MCG, he made a drive into the Richmond Paddock for eight runs. An outstanding fieldsman anywhere, Wills excelled in the slips and ran out batsmen with deadly accurate throwing.

Wills was a "tear-away" footballer whose "pluck and skill", it was said, only George O'Mullane matched. The longest drop kick in Victoria, he was an elusive dodger, as at Rugby, and excelled in different positions, moving from a follower and goal-scorer in the ruck to full back. Of the early footballers, Wills was appraised as the greatest, most astute captain, and is credited with opening up the Australian game to new tactics and skills and a more free-flowing style of play. In July 1860—in what the press called a "coup de main", and what has since been regarded as a "tactical leap" that foreshadowed modern football—Wills breached the era's notional offside line by positioning his Richmond men down the field from defence to attack. By a series of short kick passes, they succeeded in scoring. That same month, captaining Melbourne to victory, he pioneered a rudimentary form of flooding; and, in another win for the club, exploited the low player turnout by instructing his men to dart with the ball in open spaces. In his season-by-season ranking of players, early football historian C. C. Mullen named Wills "Champion of the Colony" five times. Historian Bernard Whimpress called Wills an innovator who "would fit easily into today's game". Historian Geoffrey Blainey writes: "How many of the tricks and stratagems of the early years came from this clever tactician we will never know."

== Legacy ==
He was buried on the hill top at Heidelberg, overlooking that green valley which, eight years later, Streeton and Roberts and the painters of the Heidelberg School would depict in summer colours. A third generation Australian—then a rarity—he had often expressed in football and cricket a version of the national feeling which these artists were to express in paint, and he had been quietly proud that the football game he did so much to shape was often called 'the national game'.

— Blainey, A Game of Our Own

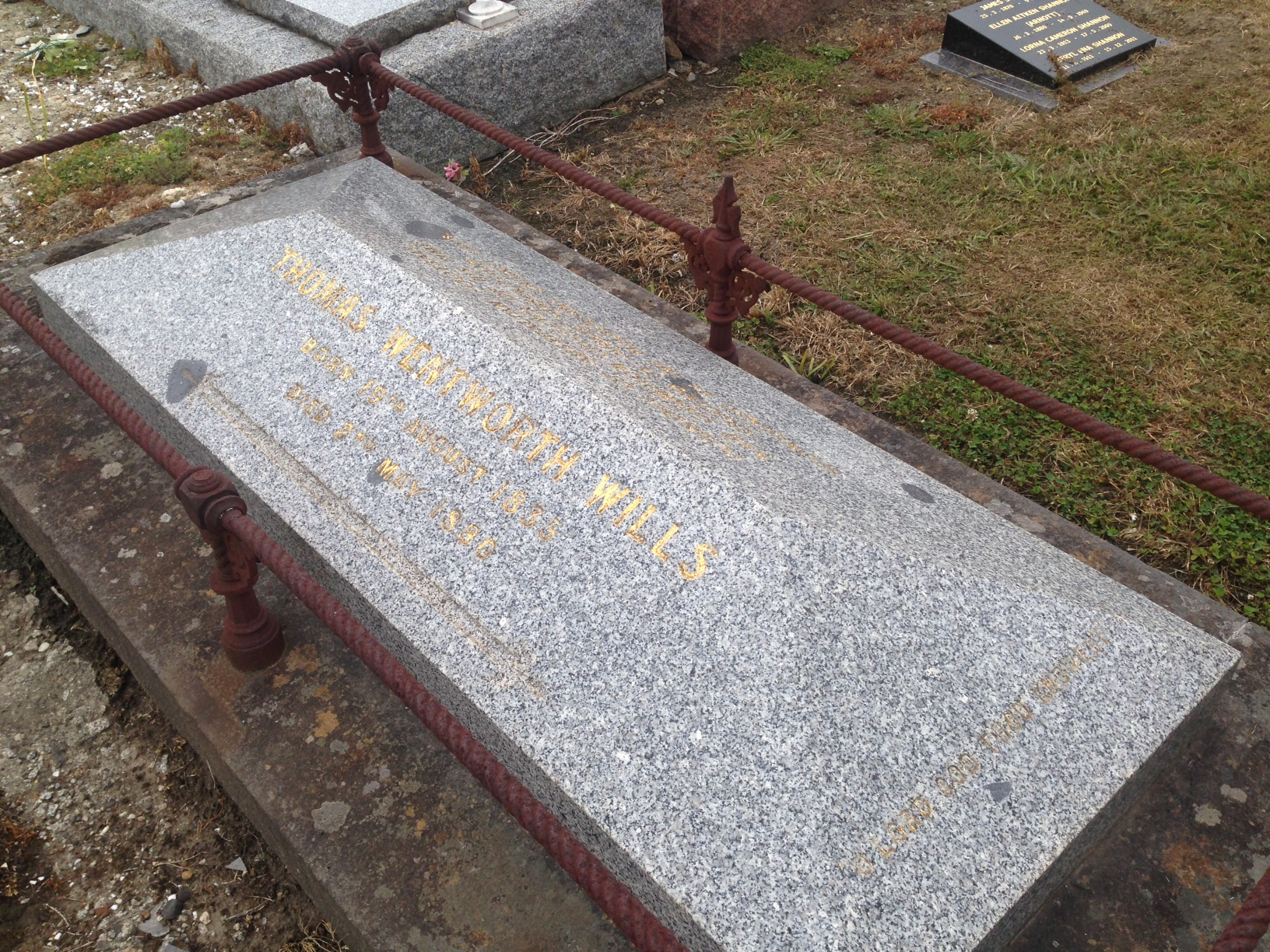
The MCC erected a monument over Wills's unmarked gravesite on the centenary of his death. The epitaph reads: "Founder of Australian football and champion cricketer of his time".

Australia's first celebrity sportsman, Wills began to fade from public consciousness within his own lifetime. His dark reputation and suicide, and his links to convictism and frontier violence—sources of cultural cringe—have been posited as reasons for his descent into obscurity. Academic Barry Judd called him "a ghost inhabiting the margins of written history". Coinciding with a revival of interest in Australia's colonial past, Wills has risen "almost to a vogue", and is seen as a forerunner of today's self-destructive star athletes, some of those qualities that alienated his peers "being less shocking to a generation that likes its heroes flawed". The subject of scholarly, literary and artistic works, his story has been likened to Ned Kelly's as a powerful and quintessentially Australian narrative, and in 2006, The Bulletin named him as one of the 100 most influential Australians. After several attempts by different authors since the 1930s, a comprehensive biography was published in 2008, Greg de Moore's Tom Wills: First Wild Man of Australian Sport.

Wills's unmarked gravesite was restored in 1980 with a headstone erected by the MCC using public funds. He was inducted into the Sport Australia Hall of Fame in 1989 and became an inaugural member of the Australian Football Hall of Fame in 1996. The Tom Wills Room in the MCG's Shane Warne Stand serves as a venue for corporate functions. A statue outside the MCG, sculpted by Louis Laumen and erected in 2001, depicts Wills umpiring the famous 1858 football match between Melbourne Grammar and Scotch College. The AFL commemorated the 150th anniversary of the match by staging the Tom Wills Round during the 2008 AFL Season. The two schools played in a curtain raiser at the MCG ahead of the round opener between Melbourne and Geelong. That same year, Victoria's busiest freeway interchange, the Monash–EastLink interchange in Dandenong North, was named the Tom Wills Interchange. Tom Wills Oval, inaugurated in 2013 at Sydney Olympic Park, serves as the training base for the AFL's Greater Western Sydney Giants.

=== Marngrook theory ===
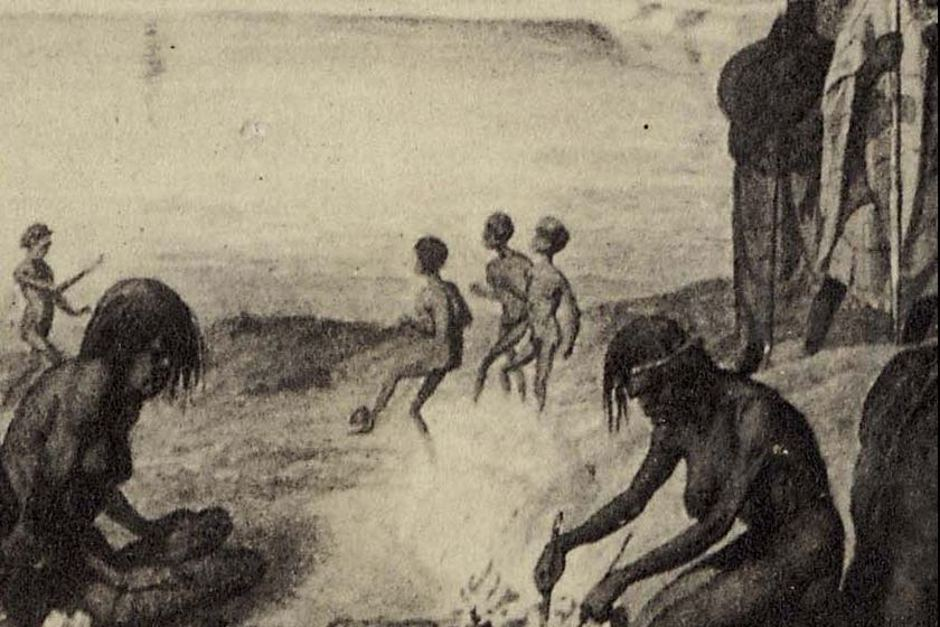
Detail of an 1857 etching that shows Aboriginal boys kicking and catching a ball made from plant roots.

Since the 1980s, it has been suggested that Wills played or observed an Aboriginal football game, Marngrook,^{[g]} as a child growing up in the Grampians among the Djab wurrung, and incorporated some of its features into early Australian football. The theory has provoked an intense debate dubbed "football's history wars". In her 2008 essay "A Seductive Myth", Hibbins calls the proposed link an "emotional belief" lacking "any intellectual credibility". She points out that neither Wills nor any other football founders mention Aboriginal games in existing documents, and states that there is no evidence of Marngrook being played in the Grampians. Since then, among the personal papers of ethnographer Alfred William Howitt, an interview has been found with a Mukjarrawaint man who recalls playing Marngrook in the Grampians. Also, in his first-hand account of Aboriginal games, James Dawson, an Aboriginal rights activist, records the Djab wurrung word for football as "Min'gorm". De Moore therefore argues that Marngrook was likely played in the vicinity where Wills grew up, "or, at the very least, that the local Aboriginal people knew of such a game". That Wills knew of Marngrook, he adds, is speculative at best.

Proponents of a link point to the games' similarities, such as drop punting the ball and leaping, catching feats. Academics Jenny Hocking and Nell Reidy write that Wills, in adapting football to Melbourne's parklands, wanted a game that kept the players off the ground and the ball in the air. "It is here", they argue, "in the interstices between rugby and Australian football, that the influence of [Marngrook] can be seen most clearly". Historian John Hirst countered that early Australian football was aligned with rugby-style roots, and bore little resemblance to Marngrook. According to de Moore, Wills was "almost solely influenced" by Rugby School football, with local conditions also having an effect.

Flanagan promoted the Marngrook theory in his novel The Call (1996), an historical imagining into Wills's life, and argued in an essay addressed to Wills that he must have known Aboriginal games as it was in his nature to play: "There's two things about you everybody seems to have agreed on—you'd drink with anyone and you'd play with anyone." He quotes Lawton Wills Cooke, a descendant of Horace Wills (Tom's brother), who said a family story had been passed down about Tom playing Marngrook as a boy. Family historian T. S. Wills Cooke disputed that such a story existed, calling the Marngrook link "a bridge too far" and an example of historical revisionism motivated by political correctness. Despite lacking in hard evidence, the theory is often presented as factual. In Moyston, the self-proclaimed birthplace of Australian football, stands an AFL-endorsed monument, unveiled by historian Col Hutchinson, commemorating Wills's childhood in the area playing Marngrook.

=== The "father of football" ===
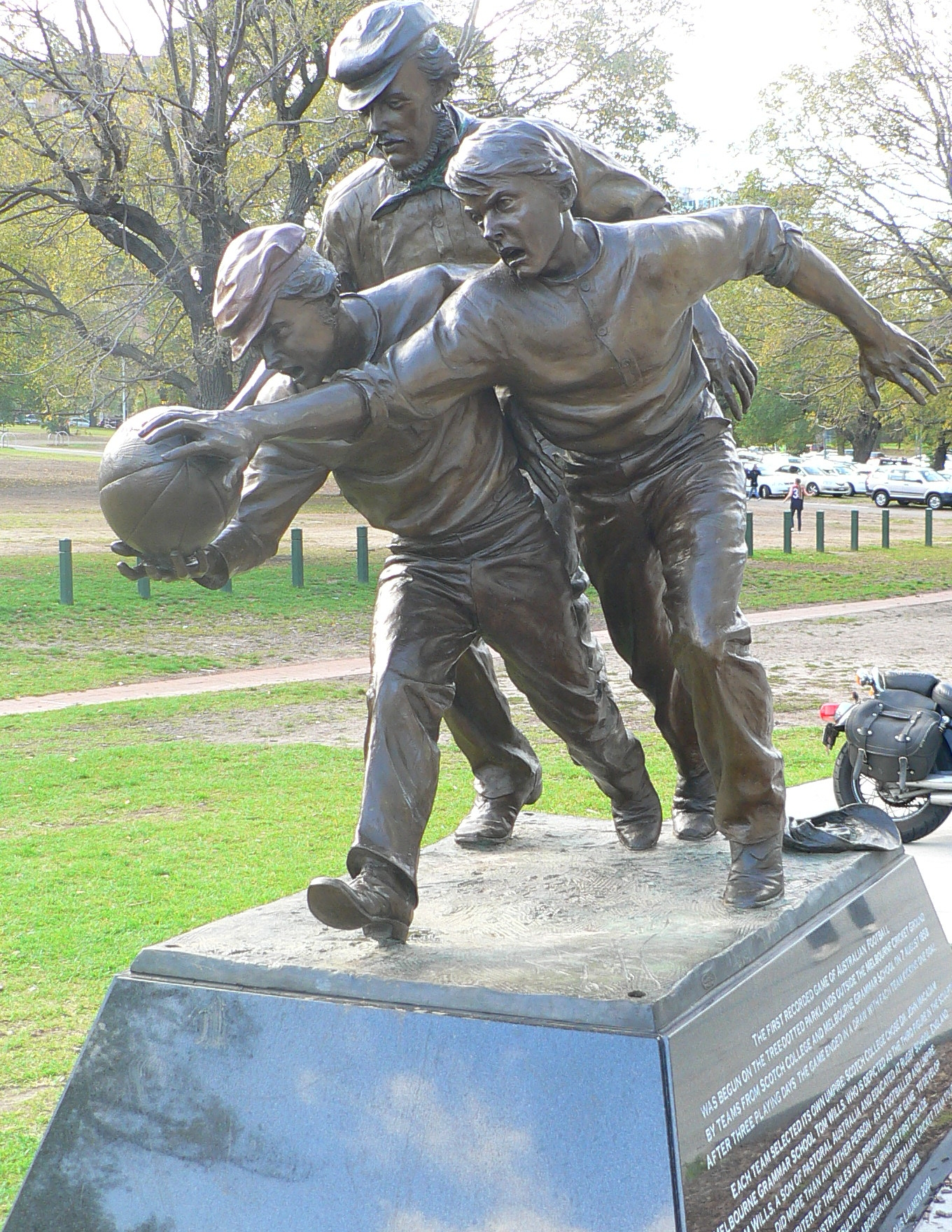
Statue outside the MCG of Wills umpiring the 1858 game between Melbourne Grammar and Scotch College. The plaque reads that Wills "did more than any other person—as a footballer and umpire, co-writer of the rules and promoter of the game—to develop Australian football during its first decade."

The role that Wills and others played in pioneering Australian football went largely unrecognised in their lifetimes, as the sport had yet to develop a historical perspective. By the late 1870s, Wills's 1858 letter calling for the organisation and codification of football was singled out as a seminal document. He wrote at this time that he attempted to promote football in Victoria as early as 1857, "but it was not taken to kindly until the following year". By 1908, the year of Australian football's jubilee celebrations, H. C. A. Harrison had become known as the "father of football" on account of his substantial reputation on and off the field. Wills was the next most often recalled pioneer during this period, and Harrison credited him with initiating the sport when he "recommended that we Australians should work out a game of our own." More recent historiography has shown that while Harrison played a pivotal role over a long period, he did not co-write the first rules in 1859, nor did he play in the 1858 games. With this correction, a number of historians elevated Wills to a position of pre-eminence, variously calling him the game's founder, father or inventor. Blainey said of Wills: "It is far too much to say that he founded the game, but it would be too little to say that he was simply one among many founders."

It is often said that, due to his suicide, Wills was written out of the game's history, or at the very least downplayed as an important figure. De Moore rejects this view, noting that the contributions of Hammersley, Smith, Thompson and other pioneers, rather than those of Wills, were generally overlooked. In her analysis of early football, Hibbins concludes that Thompson's journalistic ability as a promoter of the game "probably" makes him the most significant pioneer, and that the importance of Wills's role has been overemphasised. Echoing Hibbins's arguments, Roy Hay writes that Wills, while a "catalyst" for football, was "much more interested in playing and performing than in organising". British historian Tony Collins even compared Wills to William Webb Ellis and Abner Doubleday, the apocryphal inventors of rugby and baseball, respectively. In response to Collins's suggestion that Wills "quickly faded from the footballing scene", journalist James Coventry highlighted his seventeen-year playing career (by far the longest of the pioneers), the influence he wielded as captain-coach of various clubs for much of that time, and his administrative work. He concludes that Collins and other scholars have "perversely" devalued Wills's real contributions "in their rush to discredit [the Marngrook theory]".

== See also ==
- Cultural depictions of Tom Wills
- List of Australian rules footballers and cricketers
- List of cricketers called for throwing in top-class cricket matches in Australia
- List of Victoria first-class cricketers
- Tom Wills Medal

== Footnotes ==
a. Wills's birthplace is a matter of some conjecture as there is a lack of reliable archival information on the subject, and the precise whereabouts of his parents are difficult to pinpoint during the period around 1835. Molonglo is given as his birthplace in an 1869 biographical piece in which the author states that Wills had given him notes on his life. A common alternative is Parramatta in modern-day Sydney. When Victorians claimed Wills as one of theirs, he liked to boast that he was a "Sydney man"—a reference to the colony of his birth.

b. Tom had eight siblings: Emily Spencer Wills (1842–1925), Cedric Spencer Wills (1844–1914), Horace Spencer Wills (1847–1928), Egbert Spencer Wills (1849–1931), Elizabeth Spencer Wills (1852–1930), Eugenie Spencer Wills (1854–1937), Minna Spencer Wills (1856–1943) and Hortense Sarah Spencer Wills (1861–1907).

c. Wills and H. C. A. Harrison shared Sarah Howe as a grandmother. Harrison was born ten months after Wills in New South Wales and as a young boy overlanded to the Port Phillip District, where he often visited the Wills family at Lexington. They became brothers-in-law in 1864 when Harrison married Emily Wills.

d. The Aboriginal men went by sobriquets given to them by their European employers in the Western District. In Mullagh's case, he was named after the station where he worked.

e. This story was related in the following piece of Wills family oral history: "Elizabeth Wills refused to attend [the funeral] nor would she acknowledge Tom after his death as she was very religious and considered [suicide] a great sin. ... A reporter asked Elizabeth about her son. 'Which son?' she asked. 'Thomas' said the reporter. 'I have no son called Thomas' was the old lady's reply".

f. Gordon suffered a demise similar to that of Wills, committing suicide in 1870. He describes Wills as a fearsome bowler in his 1865 long poem "Ye Wearie Wayfarer".

g. Each Indigenous language group played its own variant of football and with its own name. "Marngrook", from the Gunditjmara language, is used as a generic term for Aboriginal football.

== Bibliography ==
Books

- Blainey, Geoffrey (2003). A Game of Our Own: The Origins of Australian Football. Black Inc. ISBN 978-1-86395-347-4.
- Clowes, Colin (2007). 150 Years of NSW First-class Cricket: A Chronology. Allen & Unwin. ISBN 9781741750829.
- Collins, Tony (2011). "The Invention of Sporting Tradition: National Myths, Imperial Pasts and the Origins of Australian Rules Football". In Wagg, Stephen (ed.). Myths and Milestones in the History of Sport. Palgrave Macmillan. pp. 8–31. ISBN 9780230320833.
- Coventry, James (2015). Time and Space: The Tactics That Shaped Australian Rules and the Players and Coaches Who Mastered Them. HarperCollins. ISBN 978-0-7333-3369-9.
- de Moore, Greg (2005). "Tom Wills, Marngrook and the Evolution of Australian Rules Football". In Hess, Rob; Nicholson, Matthew (eds.). Football Fever: Crossing Boundaries. Maribyrnong Press. pp. 128–135. ISBN 9780975238424.
- de Moore, Greg (2007). "The Tree of Life: Tom Wills, Rugby School and the Evolution of Australian Rules Football". In Bushby, Mary; Hickle, Thomas V. (eds.). Rugby History: The Remaking of the Class Game. Australian Society for Sports History. pp. 113–119. ISBN 9780975761694.
- de Moore, Greg (2011). Tom Wills: First Wild Man of Australian Sport. Allen & Unwin. ISBN 978-1-74237-598-4.
- Flanagan, Martin (2008). The Last Quarter: A Trilogy. One Day Hill. ISBN 978-0-9757708-9-4.
- Frith, David (2011). Silence of the Heart: Cricket Suicides. Mainstream Publishing. ISBN 9781780573939.
- Gorman, Sean (2011). "A Whispering: Ask not how many; ask why not?". In Ryan, Christian (ed.). Australia: Story of a Cricket Country. Hardie Grant Books. pp. 128–135. ISBN 978-174066937-5.
- Haigh, Gideon (2009). "Foreword". In Russell H. T., Stephens (ed.). Wills Way. Playright Publishing. p. i. ISBN 9780977522682.
- Hay, Roy (2009). "A Club is Born". In Murray, John (ed.). We are Geelong: The Story of the Geelong Football Club. Slattery Media Group. pp. 23–31. ISBN 978-0-9805973-0-1.
- Hedley, Harry W. (1888). At the Wickets: New South Wales versus Victoria. Centennial Printing and Publishing Co.
- Hess, Rob (2008). A National Game: The History of Australian Rules Football. Viking. ISBN 978-0-670-07089-3.
- Hibbins, Gillian; Mancini, Anne (1987). Running with the Ball: Football's Foster Father. Lynedoch Publications. ISBN 978-0-7316-0481-4.
- Hibbins, Gillian (2008). "Men of Purpose". In Weston, James (ed.). The Australian Game of Football: Since 1858. Geoff Slattery Publishing. pp. 31–45. ISBN 978-0-9803466-6-4.
- Hibbins, Gillian (2013). "The Cambridge Connection: The English Origins of Australian Football". In Mangan, J. A. (ed.). The Cultural Bond: Sport, Empire, Society. Routledge. pp. 108–127. ISBN 9781135024376.
- Hirst, John (2010). Looking for Australia: Historical Essays. Black Inc. ISBN 9781863954860.
- Howard, Bruce; Larkins, John (1981). The Young Australians: Australian Children Since 1788. Rigby. ISBN 978-0-7270-1508-2.
- Inglis, Ken (1993). Australian Colonists: An Exploration of Social History, 1788–1870. Melbourne University Publishing. ISBN 9780522845266.
- Mallett, Ashley Alexander (2002). The Black Lords of Summer: The Story of the 1868 Aboriginal Tour of England and Beyond. University of Queensland Press. ISBN 978-0-7022-3262-6.
- McKenna, Mark (1996). The Captive Republic: A History of Republicanism in Australia 1788–1996. Cambridge University Press. ISBN 978-0-521-57618-5.
- Molony, John (2000). The Native-Born: The First White Australians. Melbourne University Publishing. ISBN 978-0-522-84903-5.
- Pennings, Mark (2012). Origins of Australian Football: Victoria's Early History: Volume 1: Amateur Heroes and the Rise of Clubs, 1858 to 1876. Connor Court Publishing Pty Ltd. ISBN 9781921421471.
- Pollard, Jack (1987). The Formative Years of Australian Cricket, 1803–1893. Angus & Robertson. ISBN 9780207154904.
- Read, Walter William (1896). Annals of Cricket: A Record of the Game Compiled From Authentic Sources, and My Own Experiences During the Last 23 Years. Sampson Low, Marston & Company.
- Wills Cooke, T. S. (2012). The Currency Lad. Stephen Digby. ISBN 978-0-9803893-9-5.
- Zedda-Sampson, Louise (2021). Bowl the Maidens Over: Our First Women Cricketers. LZS Press. ISBN 9780645125504.

Journals

- de Moore, Greg (1999). "The Suicide of Thomas Wentworth Wills". Medical Journal of Australia. 171 (11). Australasian Medical Publishing Company.
- de Moore, Greg (2005a). "The Sons of Lush: Tom Wills, Alcohol and the Colonial Cricketer". Sport in History. 25 (3). The British Society of Sports History: 354–374. doi:10.1080/17460260500395907. S2CID 219696656.
- de Moore, Greg (2008a). "Tom Wills, Satan's Little Helper: A Case Study of Throwing in Nineteenth-Century Australian Cricket". The International Journal of the History of Sport. 25 (1). The British Society of Sports History: 82–99. doi:10.1080/09523360701701648. S2CID 216148262.
- de Moore, Greg (2012). "An Australian Genius at Rugby School". Floreat. 1 (1). The Rugbeian Society.
- Hibbins, Gillian; Ruddell, Trevor (2009). ""A Code of Our Own": Celebrating 150 Years of the Rules of Australian Football" (PDF). The Yorker (39).
- Hocking, Jenny; Reidy, Nell (2016). "Marngrook, Tom Wills and the Continuing Denial of Indigenous History". Meanjin. 75 (2).
- Pennings, Mark (2013). "Fuschias, Pivots, Same Olds and Gorillas: The Early Years of Football in Victoria" (PDF). Tablet to Scoreboard. 1 (1).
- Reid, Gordon (May 1981). "From Hornet Bank to Cullin-la-Ringo" (PDF). Journal of the Royal Historical Society of Queensland. 11 (2).
- Mandle, W. F. (1973). "Cricket and Australian Nationalism in the Nineteenth Century". Journal of the Royal Australian Historical Society. 59 (4).

Theses

- de Moore, Greg (2008). In from the Cold: Tom Wills – A Nineteenth Century Sporting Hero (PDF) (PhD). Melbourne, Vic.: Victoria University.
- Judd, Barry (2007). Australian Game, Australian Identity: (Post)Colonial Identity in Football (PhD). Melbourne, Vic.: Monash University. Archived from the original on 17 June 2013.

Webpages

- Flanagan, Martin (2011). "Why Tom Wills is an Australian legend like Ned Kelly". Australian Football.
- Mandle, W. F. (1976). "Thomas Wentworth Wills". Australian Dictionary of Biography.
