= Tom Wills portrait =

1870 painting by William Handcock

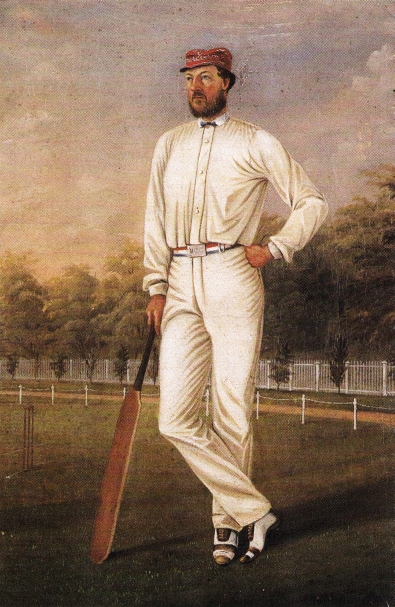
- Artist: William Handcock
- Year: 1870
- Type: Oil on board
- Dimensions: 42 cm × 32 cm (17 in × 13 in)
- Location: National Sports Museum; Melbourne

In 1870, Irish Australian artist William Handcock completed a portrait of Tom Wills, Australia's pre-eminent cricketer of the mid-19th century and one of the key founders of Australian rules football. It is unknown who commissioned the work or where it was kept after completion, but in 1923 it was acquired by the Melbourne Cricket Club through its then-secretary, Test cricket great Hugh Trumble.

The Handcock portrait is the best-known painting of Wills and is currently on display in the National Sports Museum.

== Background ==
Tom Wills is recognised as Australia's first multi-sports superstar, for he dominated cricket and was the primary catalyst behind the sport of Australian rules football. Born in 1835 in the British colony of New South Wales and raised in Victoria, Wills was sent to England in 1850 to attend Rugby School, where he became captain of the school cricket team and played a nascent form of rugby football. Returning home in 1856, Wills revolutionised Australian cricket and captained Victoria to repeated victories in intercolonial matches. In 1858 he called for the formation of a "foot-ball club" with a "code of laws" to keep cricketers fit during winter. The following year, he assisted in drawing up the laws from which Australian rules football evolved. He is regarded as one of the more complex and intriguing figures in Australian history, given his lifelong engagement with Indigenous Australians and the nature of his downfall.

Wills posed for the portrait before the end of 1870. The artist, William Handcock, was born in Ireland and lived for a period in New Zealand before relocating to Melbourne. He died from tongue cancer soon after the portrait's completion.

There is no recorded evidence of the portrait until 1923, when The Australasian reported that Test cricket great Hugh Trumble, then secretary of the Melbourne Cricket Club (MCC), purchased the painting (from whom is not stated) and donated it to the MCC.

== Description ==
The portrait is full-length, measuring 42 cm by 32 cm and done in oils, an unusual medium for Handcock. Set at sunset against a backdrop of firs in the outfield of a cricket oval, Wills is shown in his white flannels and the colours of the MCC on his belt and cap. Appearing stately like a "pasha of the East", he holds a cricket bat in the manner of a walking cane. According to biographer Greg de Moore, "he does not look like an athlete, more like a middle-aged lawyer with a liking for a nobbler". Wills' "pendulous paunch" is suggestive of the early stages of physical decline, and his coarsely reddened nose and cheeks allude to years of alcohol abuse. Historian Geoffrey Blainey detects "a slight air of weariness" in his blank expression.

== Legacy ==
The portrait is the most recognisable image of Wills and the most public symbol of his link to the MCC. It has been reproduced as souvenirs, including Christmas cards.

The portrait serves as the cover image of the 1987 book Glorious Innings: Treasures from the Melbourne Cricket Club Collection. In his historical novel The Call (1998)—a semi-fictional account of Wills' life—journalist Martin Flanagan opens the final chapter with an imagining into Handcock's encounter with Wills and the circumstances under which the portrait was painted. In 2003, the Melbourne Cricket Ground celebrated its 150th anniversary by commissioning illustrator Robert Ingpen to create a woven tapestry depicting a chronological history of the ground. The figure of Wills—the second to appear, after the MCC's inaugural president—is based on Handcock's portrait. Wills appears two more times: as umpire of the first recorded Australian rules football match in 1858, and as coach of the 1866–67 Aboriginal cricket team, the first Australian team to tour England.

== See also ==
- Cultural depictions of Tom Wills

== Bibliography ==
Books

- Blainey, Geoffrey (2003). A Game of Our Own: The Origins of Australian Football. Black Inc. ISBN 978-1-86395-347-4.
- Bouwman, Richard (1987). Glorious Innings: Treasures from the Melbourne Cricket Club Collection. Hutchinson Australia. ISBN 9780091690106.
- de Moore, Greg (2011). Tom Wills: First Wild Man of Australian Sport. Allen & Unwin. ISBN 978-1-74237-598-4.
- Flanagan, Martin (2006). The Call. Allen & Unwin. ISBN 9-780975-770801.
- Gorman, Sean (2011). "A Whispering: Ask not how many; ask why not?". In Ryan, Christian (ed.). Australia: Story of a Cricket Country. Hardie Grant Books. pp. 128–135. ISBN 978-174066937-5.
- Hay, Roy (2009). "A Club is Born". In Murray, John (ed.). We are Geelong: The Story of the Geelong Football Club. Slattery Media Group. pp. 23–31. ISBN 978-0-9805973-0-1.

Theses

- de Moore, Greg (2008). In from the Cold: Tom Wills – A Nineteenth Century Sporting Hero (PDF) (PhD). Melbourne, Vic.: Victoria University.

Webpages

- Mandle, W. F. (1976). "Thomas Wentworth Wills". Australian Dictionary of Biography.
