= Cultural depictions of Tom Wills =

Cricketer and Australian rules football pioneer Tom Wills is the subject of a growing body of works in art and popular culture.

== Visual arts ==
Painted by William Handcock in 1870, a full-length portrait of Wills in his cricket flannels is held at the National Sports Museum. Another painting of Wills wearing a football guernsey is in possession of the Geelong Football Club and held at Kardinia Park.

A monument to Wills was erected at Moyston in 1998. In 1988, the Melbourne Cricket Club erected bronze doors, designed by Robert Ingpen, outside the club's entrance, depicting Wills holding a football. A statue of Wills umpiring an 1858 football match was erected outside the Melbourne Cricket Ground in 2002.

Wills is the subject of a series of paintings by Archibald Prize nominee Martin Tighe.

== Literature ==
Martin Flanagan's 1998 historical novel The Call is a semi-fictional account of Wills' life. In it, Wills is cast as a tragic sporting genius, and the dingo is used to symbolise his identity as an "ambiguous creature" caught between indigenous and non-indigenous Australia. In The Paddock That Grew, released that same year, Keith Dunstan imagines Wills as a ghost touring modern Melbourne.

== Music ==
Wills has inspired numerous songs including "Tom Wills" (2002) by Mick Thomas of Weddings Parties Anything fame; "Tom Wills Would" (2004) by the Warumpi Band's Neil Murray; "The Ten Rules" (2010) by folk rock band The Holy Sea; and "Tom Wills" by Goanna frontman Shane Howard, written and performed exclusively for The Marngrook Footy Show.

== Film and television ==
Plans for a feature film about Wills were made in 1989 but later abandoned.

A docudrama on Wills' life, shot in 2008, had its premier at the Arts Centre Melbourne in 2014, and was subsequently shown on Australian television. Portions of the docudrama also form part of an exhibit on Wills' life at the International Cricket Hall of Fame. Wills is portrayed by Nathan Phillips.

Wills and the origins of Australian rules football are the subject of an episode of Australia: The Story of Us (2015), produced by Yahoo!7.

== Theatre ==
In 2004, Bruce Myles adapted Flanagan's novel The Call into a play of the same name for the Malthouse Theatre.
