= Verney Cameron =

Australian cricketer

Verney lovett Cameron
Personal information
- Born: 1842; Point Nepean, Sorrento, Victoria
- Died: 27 May 1881 (aged 38–39); Melbourne, Australia

Domestic team information
- Years: Team
- 1863: Victoria
- Source: Cricinfo, 3 May 2015

Verney Lovett Cameron (1842 – 27 May 1881) was an Australian cricketer. He played two first-class cricket matches for Victoria in 1863.

Cameron was the only non-family member to attend the private funeral of cricketer and Australian rules football pioneer Tom Wills, and attempted, without success, to raise funds to erect a headstone over his gravesite.

== See also ==
- List of Victoria first-class cricketers
