= James Coventry =

Australian sports journalist

James Coventry is an Australian sports journalist who has worked for the ABC since 2002. He is currently the national sports editor He also appears on ABC Radio Grandstand's AFL coverage.

A fan of Australian rules football since his childhood in Adelaide, South Australia, Coventry was the 2009 winner of the fantasy sports competition AFL Dream Team, and has written about fantasy football for the AFL Prospectus. In 2015, his first book Time and Space: The Tactics That Shaped Australian Rules and the Players and Coaches Who Mastered Them was published by HarperCollins. Historian Bernard Whimpress called it "one of the most important books yet written on the evolution of Australian Rules football". His second book Footballistics: How the Data Analytics Revolution is Uncovering Footy's Hidden Truths was published by HarperCollins in 2018. He co-authored the book with a group of football analysts.

== Bibliography ==
- Coventry, James (2015). Time and Space: The Tactics That Shaped Australian Rules and the Players and Coaches Who Mastered Them. HarperCollins. ISBN 978-0-7333-3369-9.
- Coventry, James (2018). Footballistics: How the Data Analytics Revolution is Uncovering Footy's Hidden Truths. HarperCollins. ISBN 978-1-4607-0871-2.
