= Bernard Whimpress =

Australian historian

Bernard Whimpress OAM (born 1948) is an Australian historian and author, most active in the area of sports history and especially cricket. He was curator of the museum at Adelaide Oval.

== Early life and education ==
Whimpress was born in 1948. He is a graduate of Flinders University in Adelaide.

== Career ==
Whimpress was publications manager of the South Australian National Football League from 1979 to 1984, during which time he edited the Football Budget and wrote his first book, The South Australian Football Story. From 1994 to 2009 he was curator of the Adelaide Oval Museum. He published and edited the journal of Australian cricket history, Baggy Green, from 1998 until 2010. Whimpress has also published two volumes of memoir and other books on family history, oral history, art history, and poetry.

=== Journalism/history ===
Articles, reviews and journalism by Whimpress on sporting and other subjects have appeared in numerous magazines and journals in Australia. He edited the journal Baggy Green from its inception in 1998 until 2010.

He has written several entries about sportsmen in the Australian Dictionary of Biography.

=== Work with sporting organisations ===
Whimpress was curator of the Adelaide Oval Museum and Historian for the South Australian Cricket Association (SACA) from 1994 to 2009. He is a member of the Australian Society for Sports History (ASSH), and is the founding editor of ASSH (SA) Proceedings (2016/7-).

== Recognition ==
Whimpress won the History Council of South Australia's Life-Long History Achievement Award in 2017 and is recognised as the leading sports historian in South Australia. In the 2025 King's Birthday Honours, he awarded the Medal of the Order of Australia (OAM) for services to literature as sportswriter and author.

His 1999 work Passport to Nowhere was short-listed for the Jack Pollard Trophy in 2000.

== Selected works ==
- The South Australian Football Story (South Australian National Football League, 1983)
- Adelaide Oval Test Cricket 1884-1984, with Nigel Hart (Wakefield Press, 1984)
- Test Eleven, with Nigel Hart (1994); as Great Ashes Battles (2005); as The Greatest Ashes Battles (2009)
- Passport to Nowhere: Aborigines in Australian cricket, 1850–1939 (1999)
- Chuckers: A History of Throwing in Australian Cricket (2002, Elvis Press 2004)
- A History of Australian Cricket/The Penguin History of Australian Cricket (with Chris Harte, Carlton/Penguin 2003, ISBN 0233051309; 2008)
- J.N. Crawford: His Record Innings by Innings (with Nigel Hart, Nottingham: Association of Cricket Statisticians and Historians. ISBN 1-902171-79-9)
- Adelaide Then and Now (with photographer Adam Lee, Axiom 2008, 2011)
- The Official MCC Ashes Treasures (Carlton 2009, 2010, 2013; ABC 2009); as The Official Ashes Treasures (Allen & Unwin 2013); as The Official MCC Story of the Ashes/The Official Story of the Ashes (Carlton/Hardie Grant 2015, ISBN 1780976402); Carlton/Hardie Grant 2017)
- Classic Adelaide and its Environs (with photographer Adam Lee, Axiom 2010)
- On Our Selection: An alternative history of Australian Cricket (2011)
- Cricket and Politics (2013)
- Sports Writing: A Personal Journey (2013)
- Adelaide Oval Tennis: 1878–2012 (2014)
- Baggy Green: A selection 1998–2010 (ed., 2016)
- Adelaide Oval: A photo-document 2009 (2017)
- Joe Darling: Cricketer, Farmer, Politician and Family Man (with Graeme Ryan, Ryan Publishing, 2018)
- The Towns: 100 Years of Glory 1919–2018 (Edwardstown Football Club 2019)
- George Giffen: A Biography (Walla Walla Press, 2020)
- Adelaide University Cricket Club: A History (with Robert O'Shannassy, 2022)
- Adelaide Oval 1865-1939: A history (2022)
