= The Call (Flanagan novel) =

Book by Martin Flanagan

- Author: Martin Flanagan
- Cover artist: Nada Backovic
- Language: English
- Genre: Historical novel
- Publisher: Allen & Unwin, One Day Hill
- Publication date: 1998
- Publication place: Australia
- Media type: Paperback
- Pages: 181 pp
- ISBN: 0-9757708-0-2
- OCLC: 154632077

The Call is a historical novel by Australian writer Martin Flanagan. It was first published by Allen & Unwin in 1998.

It was adapted into a stage play for Malthouse Theatre in 2004.

== Plot summary ==
The novel follows the life of Tom Wills, considered a founder of Australian rules football. Here he is the coach of the Australian Aboriginal cricket team in England in 1868 which was the first cricket tour of England by any Australian team.

== Critical reception ==
Writing in The Age Jack Hibberd commented: "While The Call deploys fictional devices, such as extensively scarred old red gums symbolically embodying the mutilated blacks, and a helmeted Nek Kelly surreally "emerging from the soft white skin of a young woman's shoulder," it does not quite have the deep knit of a novel. Nor does it quite knit as biography and history...This formal irresolution does not, howver [sic?], detract from the pleasures in this book: the vivid evocations of our colonial and Aboriginal past, of city and country, of sporting wizardry, and of the strangely soulful narrator's search for heroes in an empty culture."

== See also ==
- Australian rules football in popular culture
- 1998 in Australian literature
