= List of museums in Melbourne =

Museums and cultural sites in Melbourne

Melbourne, Australia, is home to a large number of cultural institutions, museums and historic sites, some of which are known worldwide:

Name	Type	Summary
ANZ Banking Museum	Numismatic	website, banknotes and coins, moneyboxes, office machines, firearms, gold-mining equipment and uniforms
Australian Centre for Contemporary Art	Art	Contemporary art gallery
Australian Centre for the Moving Image	Media	Film, television, digital media
Australian National Aviation Museum	Aviation	Australia's aviation heritage
Australian Music Vault	Music	Australian music, part of Arts Centre Melbourne
Australian Racing Museum	Sports	Horse racing, part of the National Sports Museum
Backwoods Gallery	Art	Urban Contemporary, Street Art
Centre for Contemporary Photography	Art	Contemporary photo-based arts
Chinese Museum, Melbourne	Ethnic	Heritage and culture of Australia's Chinese community
City Gallery, Melbourne	Art	website, exhibits from the city's art and history collections
Cooks' Cottage	Historic house	Mid 18th century cottage of Captain James Cook's parents in England that was transported to Melbourne
Fairhall (House Museum)	Art	Georgian townhouse that houses The Johnston Collection of fine and decorative art
Fo Guang Yuan Art Gallery	Art	website, traditional and contemporary concepts of Eastern philosophy through painting, sculptures, calligraphy, embroidery, pottery, decorative arts and antiques
Grainger Museum	Biographical	Documents the life, career and music of composer and pianist Percy Grainger
Hellenic Museum, Melbourne	Ethnic	Cultural traditions of ancient and contemporary Greece
Heide Museum of Modern Art	Art	website Hosts modern and contemporary art, contains a sculpture park.
Ian Potter Centre	Art	Houses the Australian part of the art collection of the National Gallery of Victoria, includes paintings, sculpture, prints, photography, fashion and textiles
Ian Potter Museum of Art	Art	Part of the University of Melbourne, includes Australian art in all media from the early nineteenth century to the present, European art, International indigenous art, classics and archaeology
Immigration Museum, Melbourne	History	Operated by Museum Victoria, history of immigration in Australia
Islamic Museum of Australia	Ethnic	Islamic art and culture
Jewish Holocaust Museum and Research Centre	Holocaust	
Jewish Museum of Australia	Jewish	Only Jewish community museum in Australia
The Johnston Collection	Art	Located in Fairhall, includes Georgian, Regency and Louis XV furniture, 18th and 19th century porcelain, and paintings from the 16th - 19th centuries
Koorie Heritage Trust	Ethnic	website, Koorie art, culture and heritage
La Trobe's Cottage	Historic house	Original mid 19th century home of Victoria's first Lt. Governor, Charles Joseph La Trobe, operated by the National Trust of Australia
Living Museum of the West	Ecomuseum	Documents social history of Melbourne's western suburbs
Mary Glowrey Museum	Biographical	website Documents the life and legacy of Melbourne doctor and medical missionary Mary Glowrey
Melbourne Maritime Museum	Maritime	Includes the museum ship Polly Woodside, 3-masted 19th century barque. Operated by the National Trust of Australia
Melbourne Museum	Multiple	Largest museum in the Southern Hemisphere, operated by Museum Victoria, exhibits include natural history, science, art, culture
Melbourne Museum of Printing	Industrial	website, Working and teaching museum of typography and printing
Melbourne Tram Museum	Transportation	Large collection of Melbourne's trams, housed in the former Hawthorn tram depot
National Gallery of Victoria	Art	Includes the Ian Potter Centre, encompasses Indigenous (Australian Aboriginal) art, Australian colonial painting, Australian Impressionist painting, 20th century, modern and contemporary Australian art
National Communication Museum	Technology	Telephones and telecommunications equipment
National Steam Centre	Engineering	website Operated by Melbourne Steam Traction Engine Club Inc, working examples of mechanical heritage
National Sports Museum	Sports	Includes the Australian Racing Museum, Australian rules football, cricket, Olympic Games, tennis, rugby league, rugby union, soccer, basketball, boxing and netball
Newport Railway Museum	Transportation	Steam, electric and diesel locomotives, carriages, signalling and other historic railway equipment and artefacts
Old Melbourne Gaol	Prison	History of the 19th century prison used until 1924
Old Treasury Building, Melbourne	History	Museum of Melbourne history from the 1830s,
Portable Iron Houses	Historic house	website, operated by the National Trust of Australia, prefabricated iron buildings from the gold rush era
RAAF Museum	Aviation	Military aircraft, official museum of the Royal Australian Air Force
Salvation Army Heritage Centre	History, cinema	website, Operated by the Salvation Army, includes original Limelight Department film studio
Schramm's Cottage Museum Complex	History	website, Operated by the Doncaster Templestowe Historical Society includes the stone Schramm's Cottage, the Waldau Cemetery and farm equipment collection.
Scienceworks	Science	Operated by Museum Victoria, hands-on science exhibits
Shot Tower Museum	Military	Located in Melbourne Central Shopping Centre, shows the production of shot balls by freefall of molten lead
TAA Museum	Aviation	website, Operated by TAA Australian Airlines 25 year club volunteers, exhibits of Trans Australia Airlines history
Victoria Police Museum	Law enforcement	website, social history of policing and crime in Victoria including uniforms, equipment, weapons

== See also ==
- Culture of Melbourne
- List of museums in Victoria (Australia)
