= CSL collection =

Hertiage-listed biological collection in Melbourne, Victoria, Australia

Ownership
- Type: Public biological museum
- Housed at: Museums Victoria: 10 Cameron St, Coburg; 11 Nicholson St, Carlton; 2 Booker St, Spotswood
- Location: Melbourne, Victoria, Australia
- Established: 1983; 43 years ago
- Funded by: Australian government; Victorian government; CSL Limited
- Size (no. of items): 652 biological items
- Culture: Biology (animal and human)
- Created: c.1916; 110 years ago
- Website: museumsvictoria.com.au

CSL collection
- Interactive map of CSL collection
- 37°48′12″S 144°58′18″E

Victorian Heritage Register
- Official name: CSL (Commonwealth Serum Laboratories) Collection
- Type: Registered object
- Criteria: A, F, H
- Designated: 20 April 2023
- Reference no.: H2422
- Categories: Manufacturing and Processing; Health Services

Register of the National Estate
- Official name: Commonwealth Serum Laboratories Museum
- Type: Defunct register
- Designated: n.d.
- Reference no.: 100512

The CSL collection is a collection of Museums Victoria that comprises 652 biological items (Note: Museums Victoria states "…over 400 artefacts…"; the Victorian Heritage Register states "…652 biological items…") that date from 1916 to 1984, together with historical scientific equipment, and are held at various locations in Melbourne, Victoria, Australia. The collection is located at the Melbourne Museum, Scienceworks, and the Melbourne Museum's Merri-bek Annexe. Up until c. 1994, it was located in the Jennerian Building at the Parkville site first occupied by CSL Limited, formerly the Commonwealth Serum Laboratories.

The collection was added to the Victorian Heritage Register on 20 April 2023 in recognition of its historical and technical significance; and the former museum, that was located on Poplar Road, in Parkville, was added to the non-statutory and now defunct Register of the National Estate on an unknown date.

== History ==
Prior to the outbreak of World War I, Australia primarily relied upon essential medicines shipped from overseas and had no domestic facility for the manufacture of vaccines, sera, and other medical products.

In 1901, the Victorian Board of Public Health built the Jennerian Building, the oldest building on the Parkville site, as the calf lymph depot for the production of a vaccine to eradicate smallpox. In 1912 the Australian government took over the site and began producing a vaccine to eradicate the bubonic plague, as well as smallpox. Four rooms of the building were used as stables for calves and another as an autopsy room.

In 1916, the Australian government founded the Commonwealth Vaccine Depot on the Parkville site, later to become the Commonwealth Serum Laboratories, commonly known as CSL, as an organisation focused on the manufacture of essential medicines and vaccines, later expanding its role into research and development. The first vaccine produced by CSL was in 1919 for protection from Spanish influenza; and other notable early produced included insulin for diabetics, the production of penicillin, and antivenene for tiger snake bites, amongst others.

In 1975 a group of staff volunteers formed an unofficial museum committee and began collecting a wide range of historic items carefully preserved by staff in many work places. In 1983 the committee was given official status and began cataloguing several hundred items.

In 1994, the Commonwealth Serum Laboratories was privatised by the Keating government as CSL Limited and was publicly listed and traded on the Australian Securities Exchange. The company completed an initial public offering in June 1994 at A$2.30 per share. As of February 2020, CSL was an Australian multinational biotechnology public company that conducted research, development, manufacturing, and marketing of products to treat and prevent serious human medical conditions; and its stock was part of the S&P/ASX 20 index.

== Description ==
The CSL (Commonwealth Serum Laboratories) Collection includes laboratory equipment, instruments, product samples, glassware, and a samples case used by CSL's first medical sales representative. The collection provides insight into the diverse work of CSL from 1916 to 1984, including its critical role in responding to public health crises such as the Spanish influenza pandemic. It also highlights CSL’s ongoing work in developing important vaccines, antivenenes, veterinary medicine, and blood therapies.

The collection is scientifically and technically significant for its ability to illustrate the manufacturing capabilities of CSL, as well as its adaptation of existing biotechnology for specifically Australian purposes. CSL's manufacturing capacity is evident in the size and breadth of the collection, which features an array of medicines from the early 1920s. The collection also highlights key innovations in medical history, including the development of antivenenes against Australian fauna and the development of immunoglobin.

== See also ==
- List of places on the Victorian Heritage Register in the City of Hobsons Bay
- List of places on the Victorian Heritage Register in the City of Melbourne
- List of places on the Victorian Heritage Register in the City of Merri-bek
- Museums in Melbourne
