= Ellen Clark =

Australian carcinologist, influenza researcher and naturalist (1915-1988)

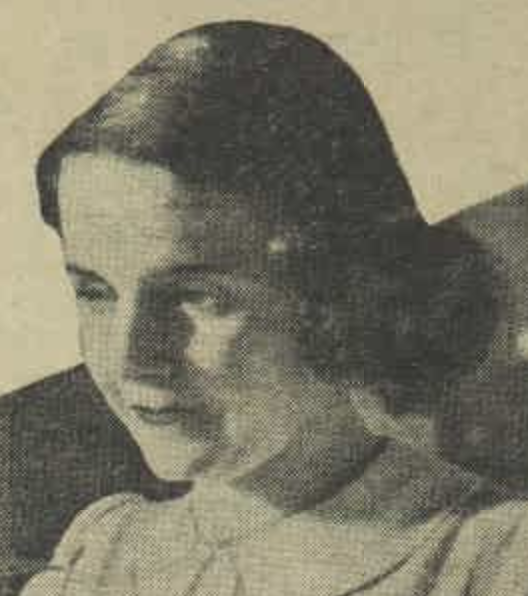
- Ellen Clark, c.1939
- Born: 25 March 1915; Geraldton, Western Australia
- Died: 2 May 1988 (aged 73); Santa Clara, California
- Spouse: Alex Guba
- Scientific career
- Fields: Naturalism, carcinology, virology, entomology

Ellen Clark (1915–1988) was an Australian carcinologist and naturalist, whose work focused on crustaceans and ants Clark studied, named, described and published many of the Australian freshwater crayfish species such as Cherax Destructor. By 1939, she was reported to have identified more than half the known species of Australian crayfish. She conducted research about blood groups in crustaceans and made a significant contribution to the study of crayfish genera. She was the first woman to publish in the Memoirs of the National Museum of Victoria.

Ellen Clark's crayfish, Euastacus clarkae, was named after Clark in recognition of her pioneering parastacid studies. Clark's work has had a lasting legacy and is still being debated in scientific papers.

== Early life ==
Clark was born in Geraldton, Western Australia on 25 March 1915, to Scottish-born parents John and Maggie Clark. John Clark, a car builder, was a renown entomologist and authority on Australian ants, despite having no formal qualifications.

In 1926, Ellen Clark moved to with her family to Melbourne following her father's appointment as an entomologist at the National Museum of Australia.

== Scientific work ==
In 1936, Clark published The Freshwater and Land Crayfish of Australia, becoming the first woman to publish in the Memoirs of the National Museum of Victoria.

In 1940, Clark resigned from Melbourne Museum after failing to secure a permanent position, and commenced as a secretary in the virology department of the Walter and Eliza Hall Institute (WEHI). Despite being employed in a clerical role, Clark continued studying crustacea, including its application to serology and immunology, as well as influenza. At WEHI, Clark also worked with Australian virologist and future Nobel Laureate Sir Macfarlane Burnet. Clark co-authored several papers at WEHI, including Influenza in 1942 with Burnet.

Clark left the WEHI in 1945 to continue studying entomology with her father. The pair worked from their home in Box Hill, and later from Mooroolbark, and they specialised in the physiology of bull ants. In 1947 she tested the reaction of ants to air travel and travelled with 4,500 ants on a three week, return, trip to the United States, In 1950 she spent a year studying at Rutgers University, on a Rockefeller grant, where she met and married Alex Guba and chose to relocate to America.

== Death ==
Clark died on 2 May 1988 in Santa Clara, California.
