= Daniel James Mahony =

Australian scientist

Daniel James Mahoney (1878–1944), was an Australian scientist in the field of geology and petrology. He was a specialist in the Victorian Mines Department, undertook research in Cambridge and was director of the Museum of Victoria from 1931 to 1944.

== Early life and education ==
Daniel James Mahoney was born on 25 March 1878 in East Melbourne, Victoria. His parents were Irish-born Daniel Mahony, who was mayor of Fitzroy, and Catherine, née Finnigan. Mahoney was educated at Downside School, Somerset, England, and then Xavier College in Melbourne. He studied at the University of Melbourne and was enrolled at Ormond College from 1898. He graduated with a Bachelor of Science in 1904 and a Master of Science in 1906 in geology. Professors J. W. Gregory and E. W. Skeats were his supervisors. Mahoney filled in for Gregory in 1902–04, demonstrating in geology. In 1912 he deputised at the University of Adelaide for Antarctic explorer (Sir) Douglas Mawson.

Mahony was one of the first specialists with a higher degree to be appointed to the Victorian Mines Department briefly replacing as petrologist (Sir) Albert Kitson when he resigned. This appointment was made permanent on 23 February 1915. He made a significant contribution to petrology with H. J. Grayson for the study of the Mount Elephant and Camperdown district. He completed several bibliographies as editor in the department.

Mahony enlisted as a second lieutenant in the Royal Artillery in Britain in 1915 and was promoted to the rank of acting captain in August 1917. He saw service on the Western Front and, following discharge, joined petrological research at Sedgwick Museum in Cambridge. He returned to Melbourne in March 1920 to resume his duties in the Mines Department.

== Australian appointments ==
Mahony was made director of the National Museum of Victoria in April 1931 replacing J. A. Kershaw, where he encouraged research and scholarship among the existing staff, despite the funding cuts imposed by the Government during the Depression. He also re-established the Memoirs of the National Museum of Victoria He also started the practice of engaging honorary staff to assist in the museum's work and promoted its public image through a new display program on modern American methods that had been demonstrated in Australia in 1937, for which he raised funds from private individuals and through a grant from the Carnegie Corporation; he also made a personal benefaction.

In 1937 Mahony was one of the founders of the Art Galleries and Museums Association of Australia and New Zealand and was elected first president. A member of the Royal Society of Victoria from 1901, he was president in 1939–40. In addition to his geological interests on which he contributed several scientific papers and reports, Mahony was keenly interested in Australian ethnology, particularly the question of the antiquity of man in Australia on which he published major papers.

Mahony was a founding member of the Art Galleries and Museums Association of Australia and New Zealand in 1937 and President of the Royal Society of Victoria in 1939-40 and retired from the Museum on 31 July 1944, but died soon after at the Melbourne Club of peritonitis from diverticulitis on 27 September 1944. Forty-one friends subscribed to install a memorial plaque at the museum which was unveiled May 1945.
