= Ellen Clark's crayfish =

Conservation status
- Endangered (IUCN 3.1)

Scientific classification
- Domain: Eukaryota
- Kingdom: Animalia
- Phylum: Arthropoda
- Class: Malacostraca
- Order: Decapoda
- Suborder: Pleocyemata
- Family: Parastacidae
- Genus: Euastacus
- Species: E. clarkae

Binomial name
- Euastacus clarkae Morgan, 1997
- Range of Euastacus clarkae

Species of crayfish

Ellen Clark's crayfish (Euastacus clarkae) was named by Morgan "in respect of Ellen Clark’s pioneering parastacid studies". It is restricted to headwater reaches of highland streams draining the plateau and feeding the Hastings and Forbes rivers, at elevations ranging from 670–1,150 metres (2,200–3,770 ft) asl. The species is assessed as "Endangered" based on an extent of occurrence (EOO) of 198 square kilometres (76 sq mi), an area of occupancy (AOO) of 68 square kilometres (26 sq mi) occurrence at one to two threat-based locations and a speculated decline in area, extent and quality of habitat due to climate change. This species is fully protected by the Australian government regulations, hence no trade or commercial utilization of the species is allowed. Horwitz and Richardson classified crayfish burrows based on their relationship to the water table, into three categories:

- Type 1: Burrows in or connected to permanent waters
- Type 2: Burrows connected to the water table
- Type 3: Burrows independent of the water table

E. clarkae constructs a burrows system according to the location and maturity of the burrow builder, however, all burrows would be within the “Type 1” category with all burrows in, or connected to open water.
