= Victoria Police Museum =

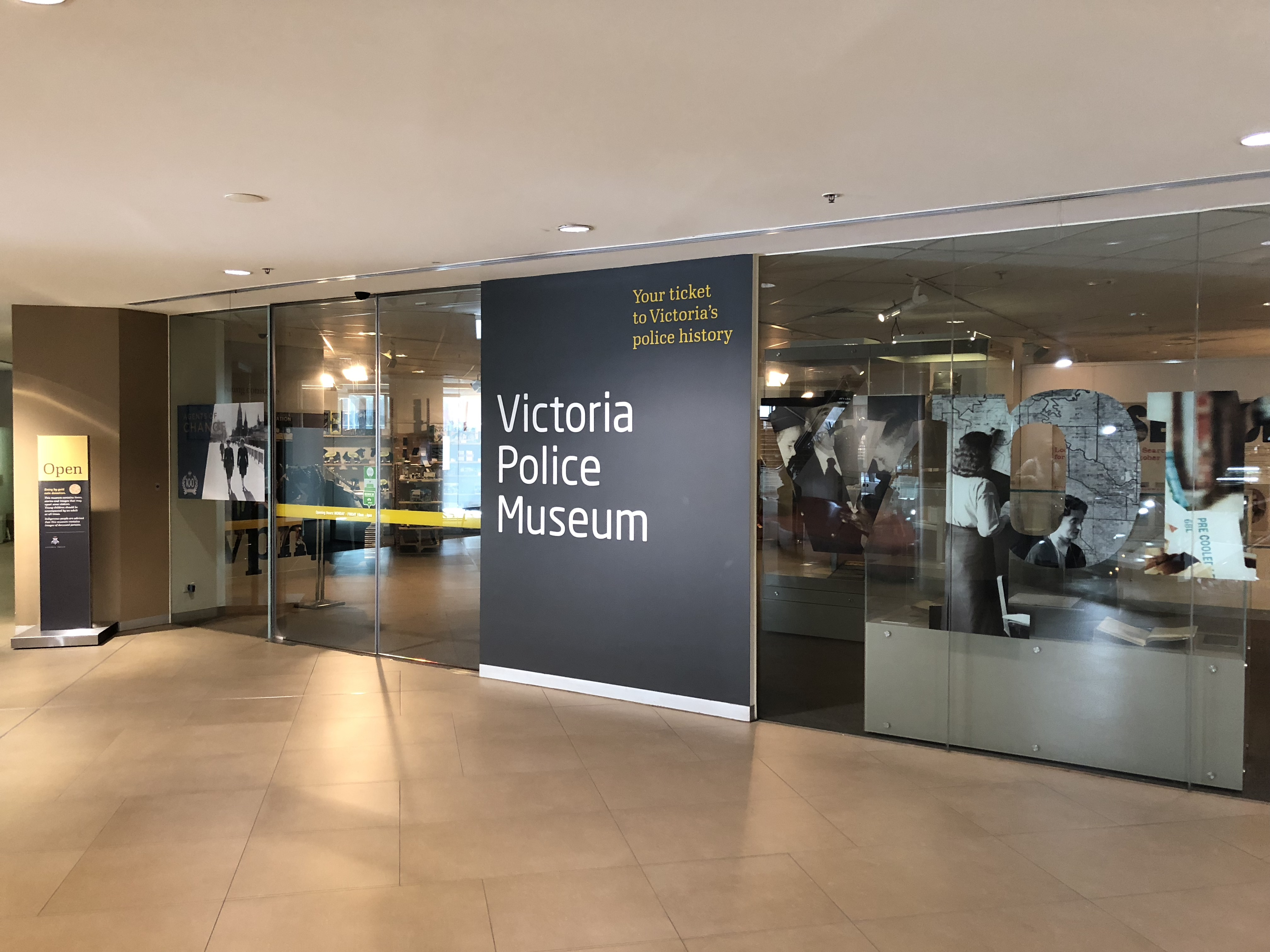
- Location: Melbourne, Victoria, Australia
- Coordinates: 37°49′21.0″S 144°57′14.8″E
- Type: Police museum
- Key holdings: Armour of the Kelly gang
- Owner: Victoria Police
- Website: www.policemuseum.vic.gov.au

The Victoria Police Museum is a law enforcement museum operated by the Historical Services Unit within Victoria Police. The new state-of-the-art museum reopened to the public on Monday 25 September 2023, following a 3 year build and development.

The museum's collection includes relics and artefacts from over 150 years of crime and policing in the state of Victoria, including a forensic evidence brief used to convict, Julian Knight of the Hoddle Street massacre, wreckage from the Russell Street bombing of police headquarters, and the death mask of executed murderer Frederick Deeming.

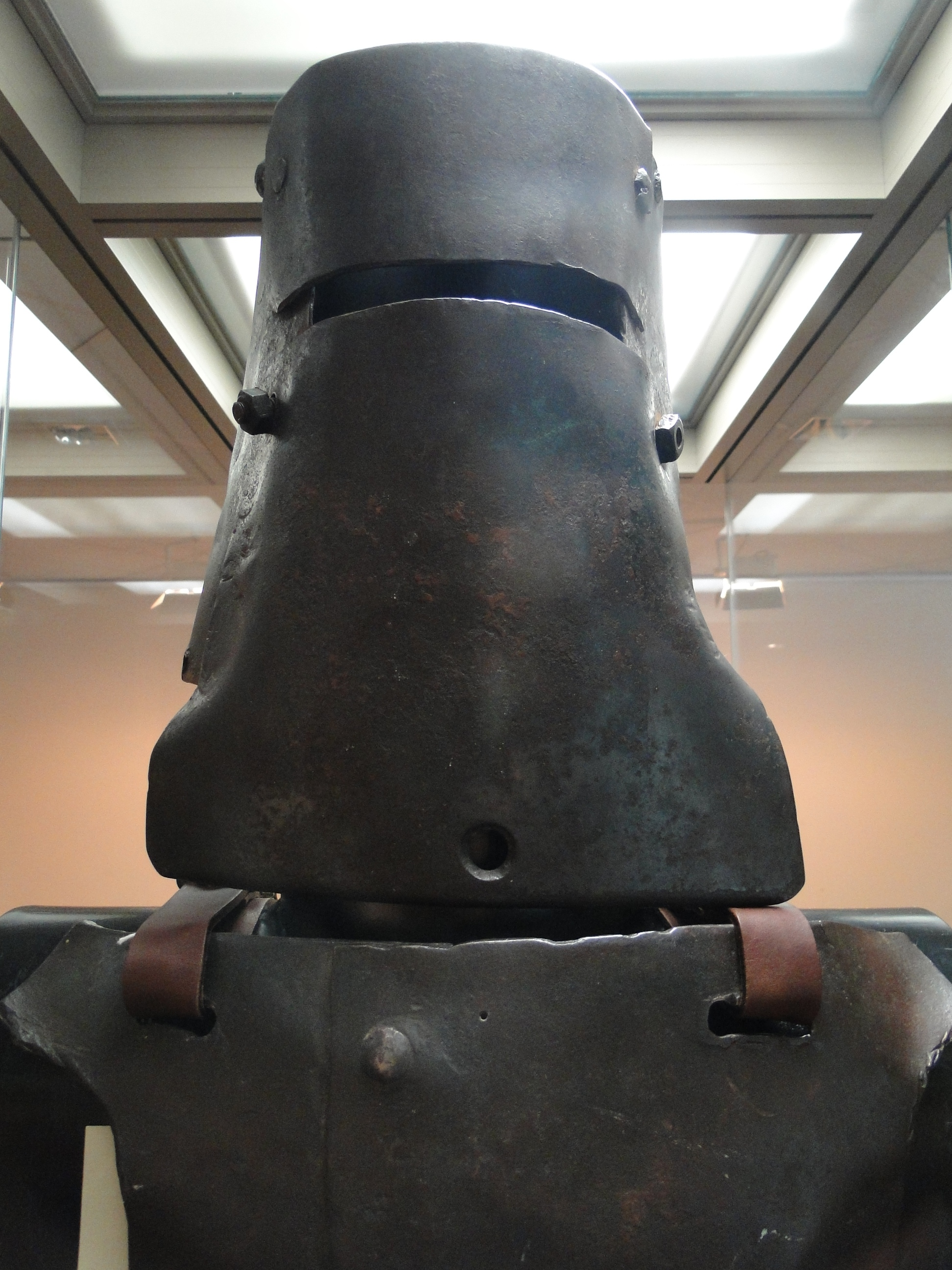
Close up of Dan Kelly's helmet

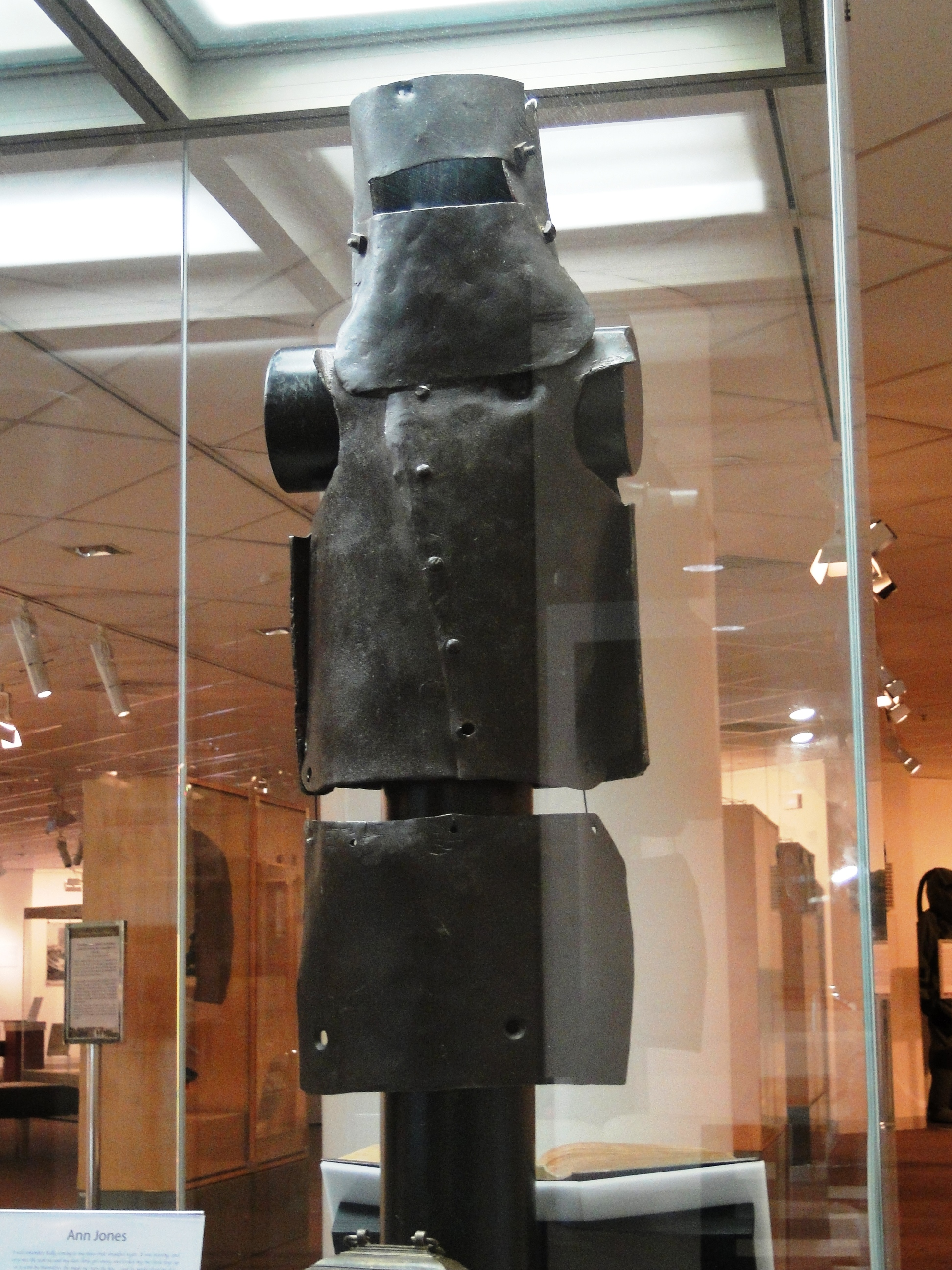
Set of Steve Hart's armour

The museum held the backplate of the armour of the bushranger Ned Kelly, until 2002 when it donated the piece to the State Library of Victoria to make a complete set of Kelly's armour along with other pieces from Melbourne Museum and Scienceworks. In addition, historian Ken Oldis identified some items misidentified as Kelly's which actually belonged to other members of his gang. The museum holds Australia's largest collection of Kelly Gang armour, including the sets of armour worn by gang members Dan Kelly and Steve Hart.
