= Australian Sports Museum =

Coordinates: 37.818921°S 144.984249°E

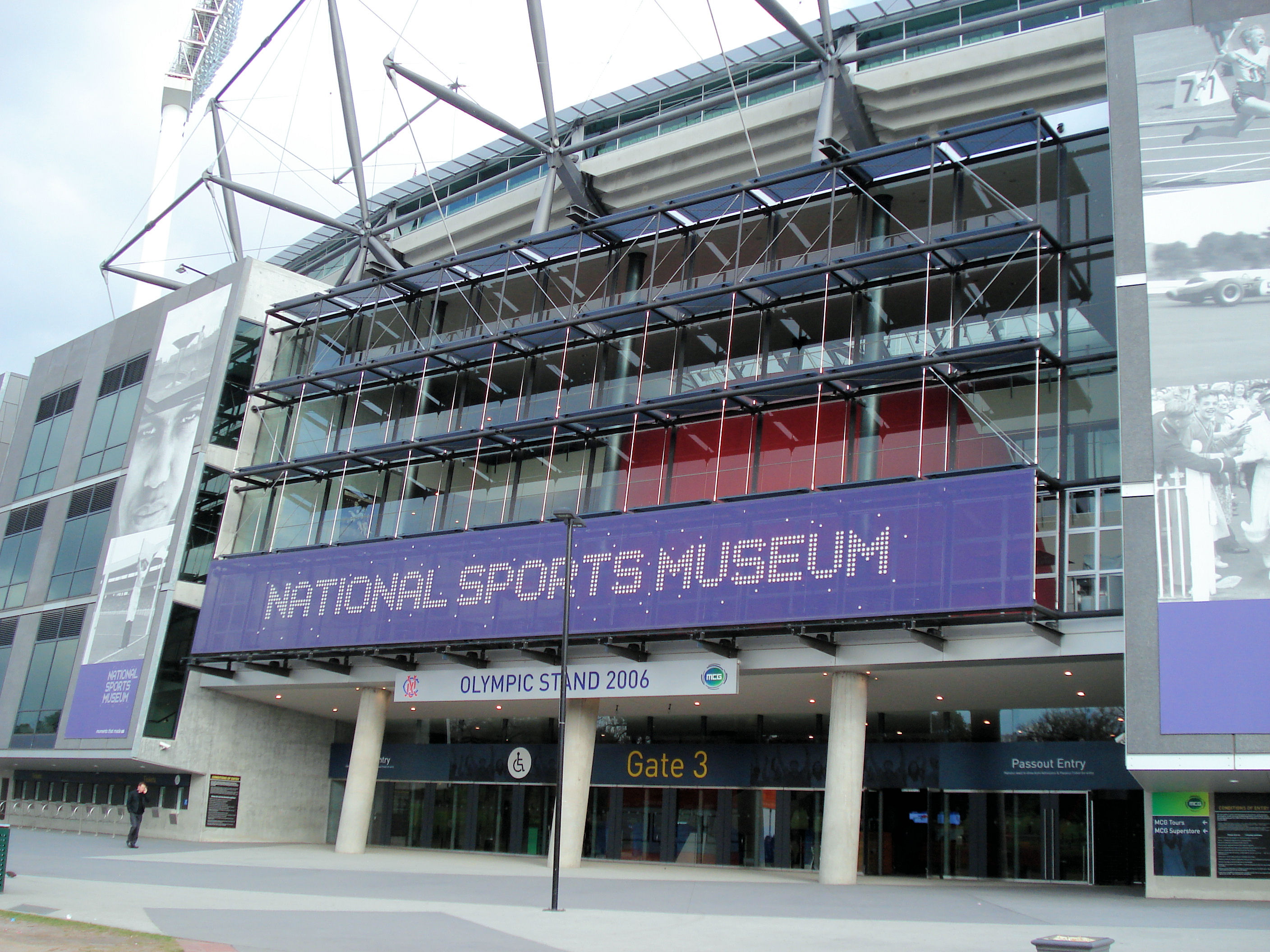
- Outside Australian Sports Museum at the Melbourne Cricket Ground
- Former name: National Sports Museum
- Established: 22 November 1986; As the Australian Gallery of Sport and Olympic Museum; 13 March 2008; As the National Sports Museum
- Dissolved: 4 October 2003; As the Australian Gallery of Sport and Olympic Museum
- Location: Melbourne, Australia
- Type: Sporting museum
- Website: australiansportsmuseum.org.au

The Australian Sports Museum, formerly the National Sports Museum, is a museum dedicated to Australian sport and is located within the Melbourne Cricket Ground in Melbourne, Australia. There are exhibits for sports such as cricket, Australian rules football, the Summer and Winter Olympic Games, tennis, rugby league, rugby union, soccer, basketball, boxing and netball. The Australian Sports Hall of Fame is also located within the museum along with the Australian Racing Museum and the Melbourne Cricket Club Museum.

The adjoining MCC Museum features exhibitions relating to the history of the Melbourne Cricket Club. On 6 October 2010, the Australian Racing Museum was absorbed into the Australian Sports Museum, which has now resulted in horse racing standing alongside other prominent Australian sports.

The museum was called the National Sports Museum, and closed in August 2019 for a $17.1 million redevelopment ($5 million of which was contributed by the state government). It is set to re-open (with the new name) in February 2020.

== Australian Gallery of Sport and Olympic Museum ==
Before the Australian Sports Museum opened, the Australian Gallery of Sport and Olympic Museum operated for 17 years before it closed. The museum was located in front of the former MCC Members Stand which opened in 1928, which was demolished at the same time as the museum. It initially opened on 22 November 1986 before closing to the public on 4 October 2003. More than 35,000 went through the museum in its final week in operation, when it was opened to the public for free in conjunction with access to the former MCC Members Pavilion.
