= Memoirs of Museum Victoria =

- Discipline: Natural sciences
- Language: English
- Edited by: Richard Marchant

Publication details
- Former name(s): Memoirs of the Museum of Victoria; Memoirs of the National Museum of Victoria
- History: 1906–present
- Publisher: Museums Victoria (Australia)
- Frequency: Annually
- Open access: Yes
- Impact factor: 0.667 (2022)

Standard abbreviations
- ISO 4: Mem. Mus. Vic.

Indexing
- ISSN: 1447-2554 (print); 1447-2546 (web)
- OCLC no.: 61566084

Links
- Journal homepage

Memoirs of Museum Victoria is a peer-reviewed annual scientific journal covering natural sciences pertinent to the collections of Museums Victoria and/or the Australian state of Victoria. It is published by Museums Victoria and the editor-in-chief is Richard Marchant. The journal was established in 1906 as Memoirs of the National Museum of Victoria, obtaining its current name in 1984. The journal is abstracted and indexed in Scopus.
