= Australian Racing Museum =

Coordinates: 37.818921°S 144.984249°E

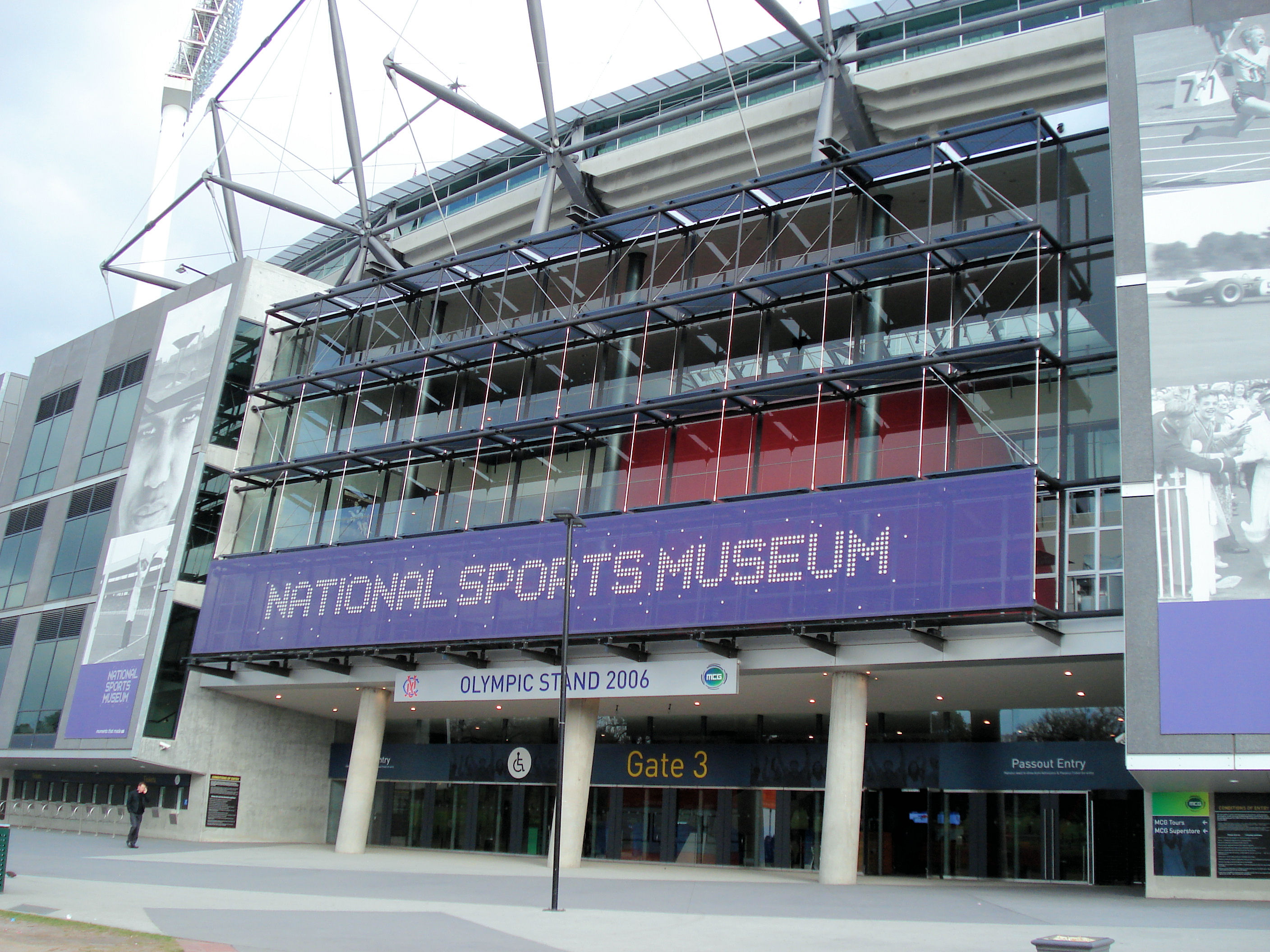
- The National Sports Museum where the Australian Racing Museum collection is housed.
- Established: 1981
- Type: Sporting museum
- Website: https://rv.racing.com/careers-and-education/australian-racing-museum

The Australian Racing Museum is a horse racing museum in Melbourne, Australia, dedicated to Thoroughbred horses, jockeys and trainers. It was first set up at Caulfield Racecourse in 1981 and closed on 30 August 2003. It then moved to Federation Square on Flinders Street. In October 2010 the museum moved to the Australian Sports Museum (then National Sports Museum) at the MCG
