= The Johnston Collection =

Museum in Melbourne, Australia

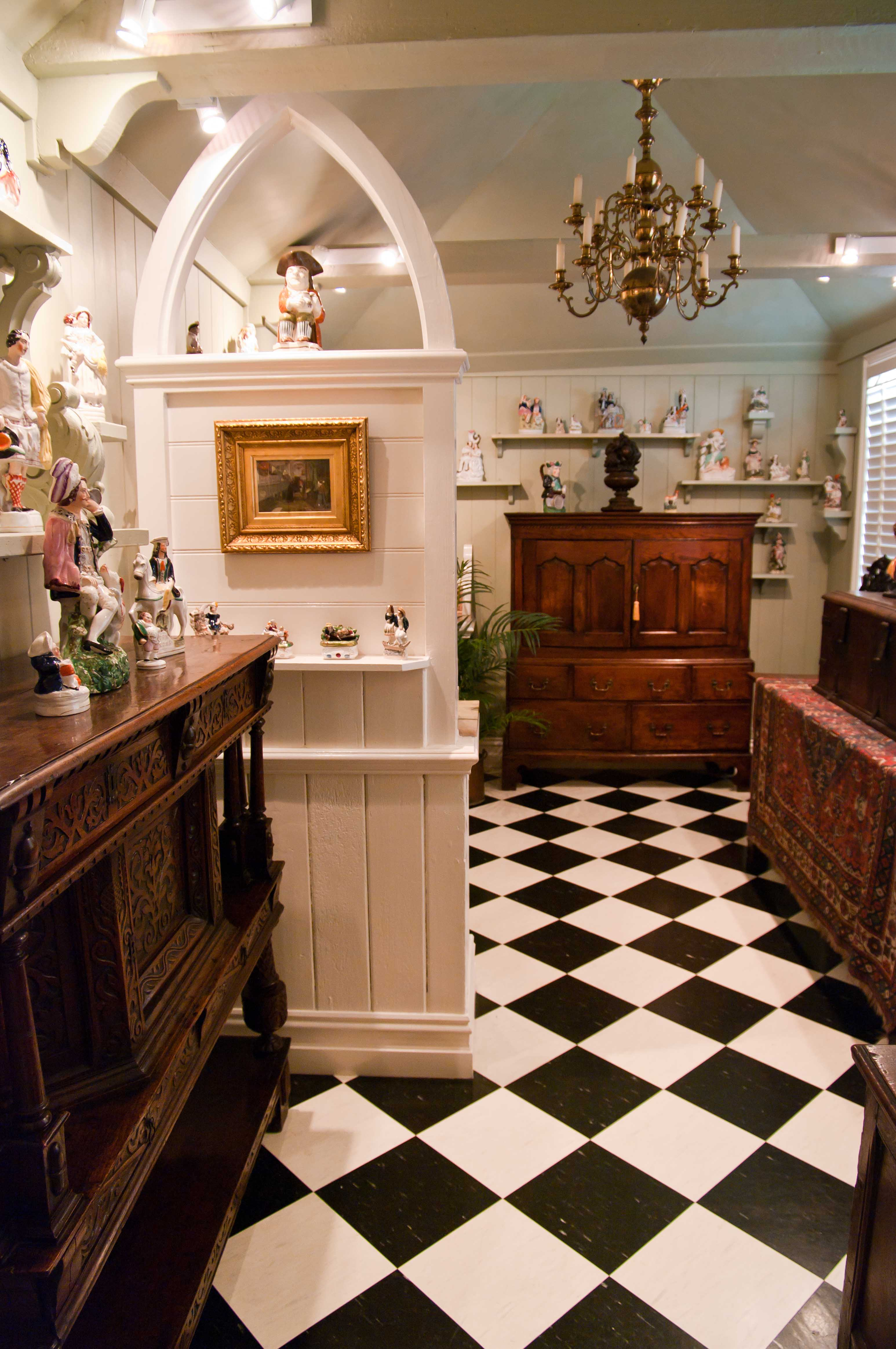
- The kitchen
- Established: 1990
- Location: East Melbourne
- Founder: William Robert Johnston
- Website: www.johnstoncollection.org

The Johnston Collection (East Melbourne, Australia) is a house museum with a collection of c.1700-1840 English Georgian, Regency, and Louis XV fine and decorative arts, and objet d’art which was a gift from William Robert Johnston (1911-1986) to the people of Victoria. Johnston was a Melbourne-born antique dealer, real estate investor and collector, with business premises at Kent Antiques (Armadale, Melbourne) and in Greenwich, London.

The Johnston Collection operates as a not-for-profit museum and presents exhibitions, public programs, lectures, and guided tours focused on the history of art, design and the decorative arts. The Collection is displayed in a regularly re-arranged domestic setting, in line with Johnston’s wishes, in his former residence, Fairhall, an historic 1860s East Melbourne townhouse. The Collection includes furniture, paintings, silver, ceramics, and horology and has been developed over the years through subsequent donations, including a significant bequest from Clive (Roger) Brookes in 2022.

Fairhall was originally built by John M. McIntosh of Nicholson Street, Melbourne for dental surgeon James Cummings, as a single front property with six rooms. In 1883, the subsequent owner, landowner and stock and station agent George Hamilton Dougharty named the property Cadzow. William Johnston purchased the property from the Dougharty family in 1952 and renamed it Fairhall. Under his ownership, the house was remodelled to simulate the appearance of a Georgian townhouse. These alterations included changes to the fenestration, the replacement of the front door and the insertion of a semicircular fanlight. The house and his collection were bequeathed to the people of Victoria by Johnston in 1986.

In accordance with Johnston’s wishes, the Collection is displayed in a regularly re-arranged domestic setting without labels, ropes or barriers. All visitors are conducted through the house museum by volunteer guides.

The Johnston Collection has an active network of supporters, The Friends of The Johnston Collection. Collection objects are digitised and can be viewed on the museum's website.

The Johnston Collection is open to the public from Wednesday to Sunday for pre-booked, guided tours. As the Collection is located in a residential neighbourhood, all visitors meet at the Pullman East Melbourne (192 Wellington Parade, East Melbourne) and travel to museum in a Courtesy Bus, a five minute journey.

== Gallery ==
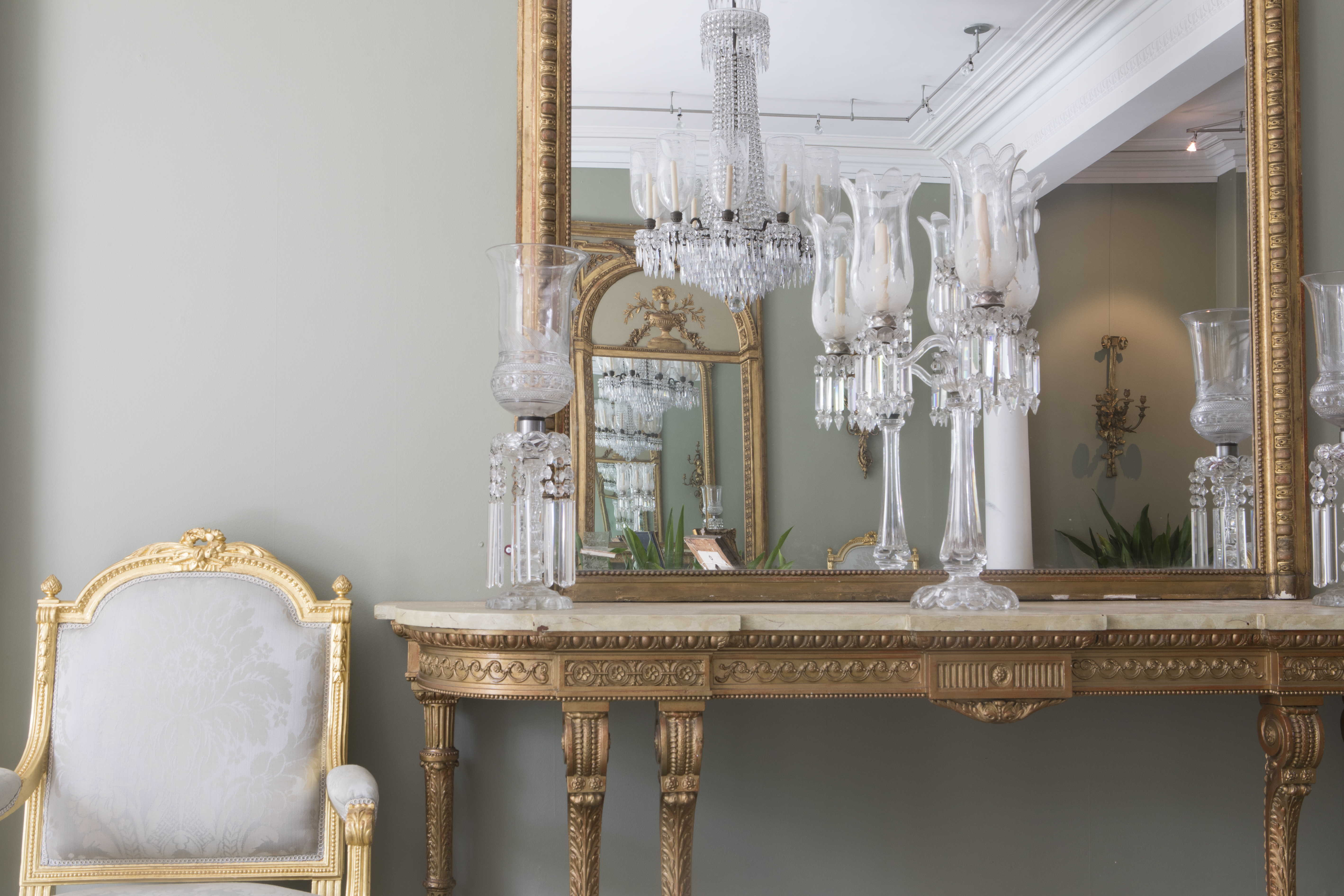
The Green Room

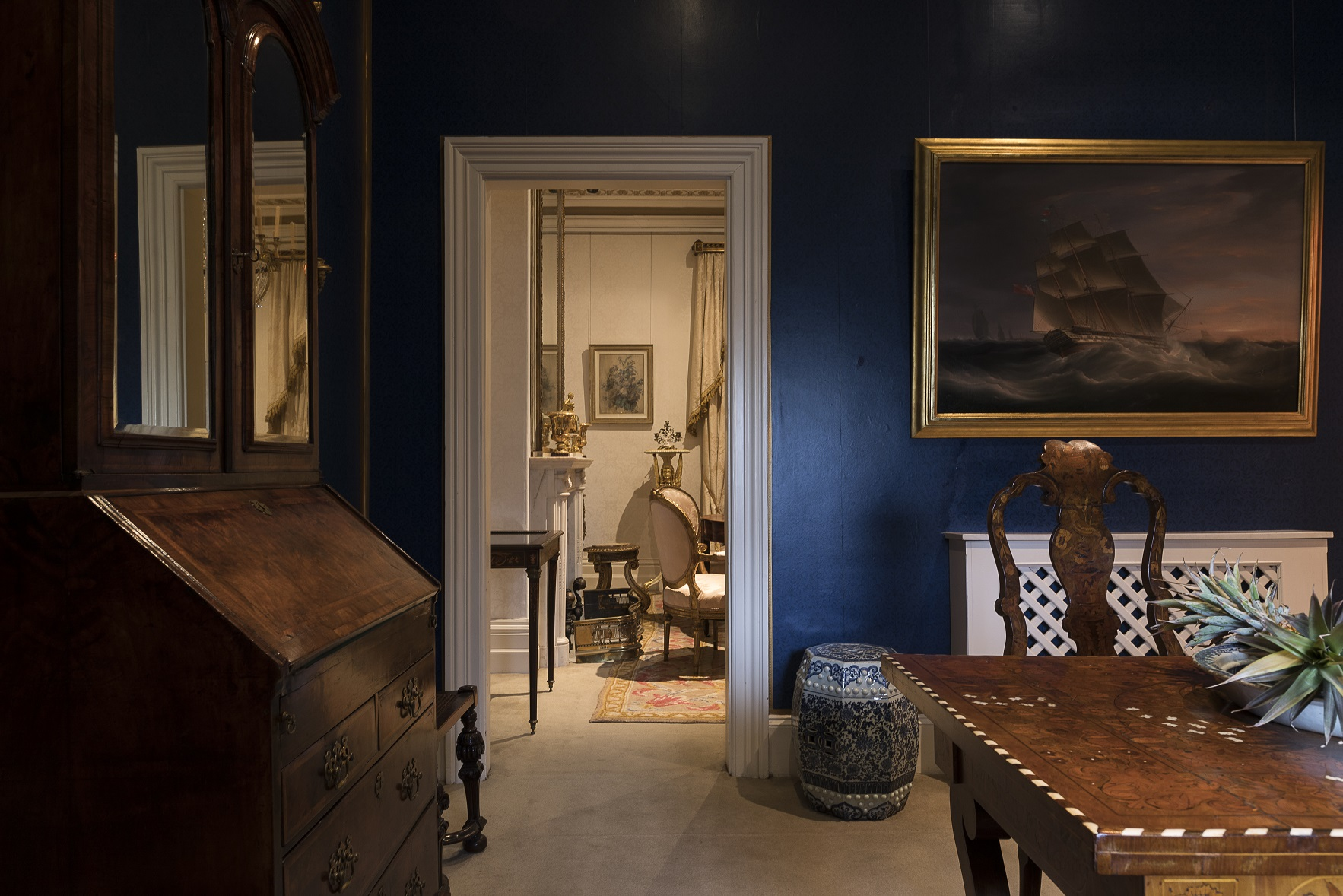
The Blue Room

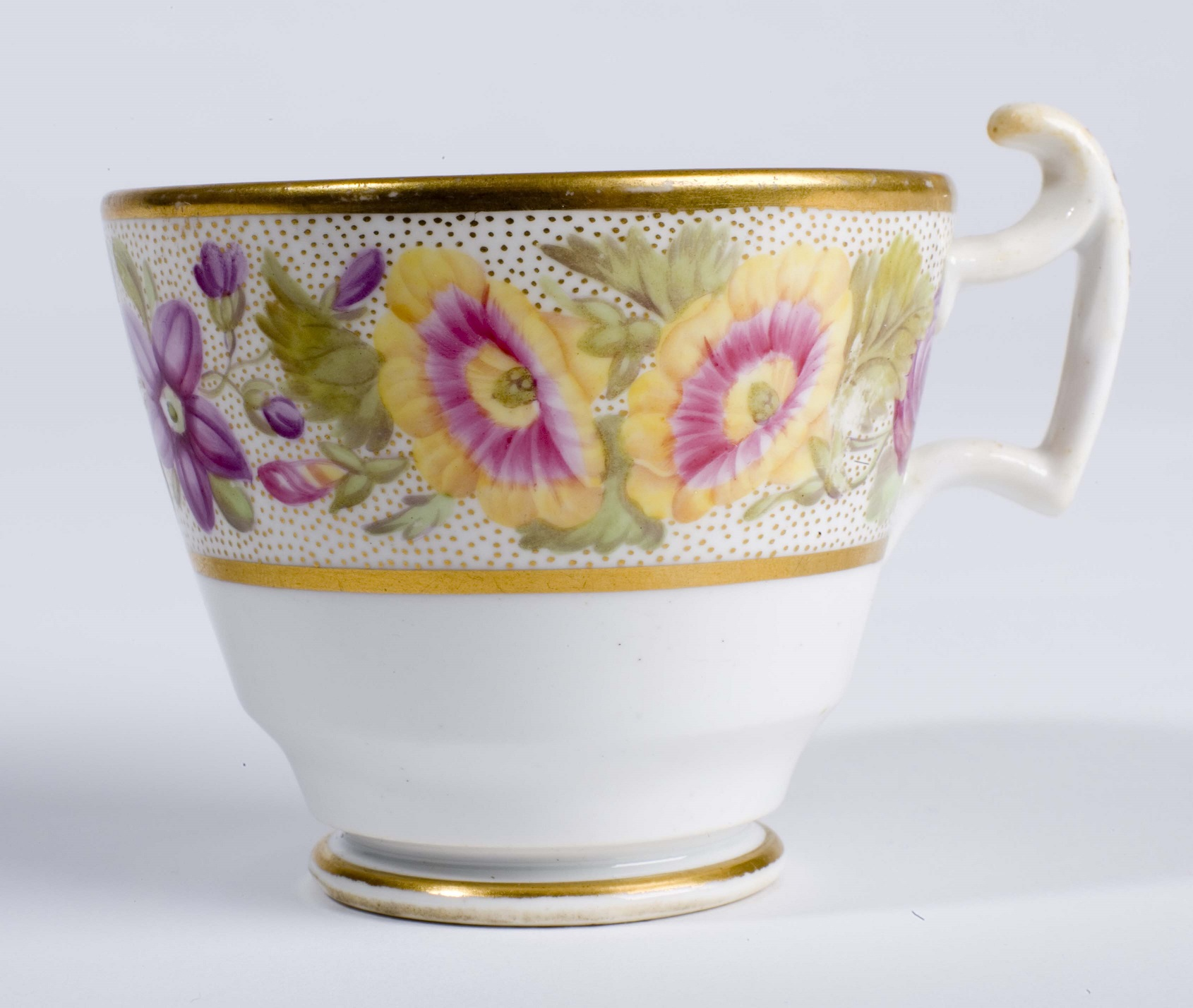
Minton Potteries, cup, circa 1811, The Johnston Collection. The first object acquired by William Johnston
