= Museums Victoria =

Museum operator in Victoria, Australia

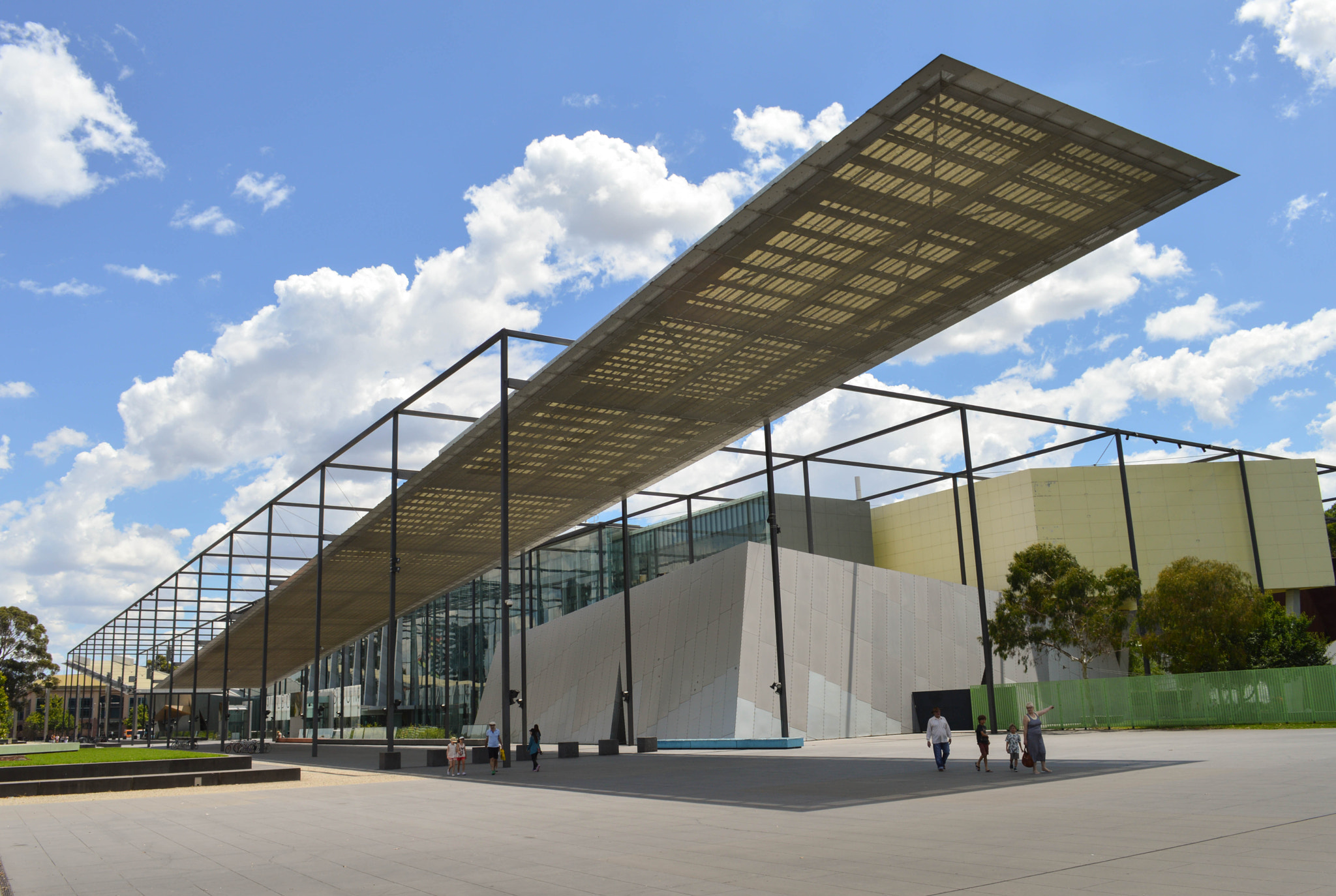
- Melbourne Museum, the main campus of the organisation
- Interactive fullscreen map
- Former name: Museum of Natural and Economic Geology; Industrial & Technological Museum; Museum of Applied Science; Institute of Applied Science; National Museum of Victoria; Science Museum of Victoria; Museum of Victoria; Museum Victoria
- Established: 1854
- Location: Melbourne, Victoria, Australia
- Coordinates: 37°48′12″S 144°58′18″E
- Type: Natural history, cultural history, and science and technology
- Collections: Geology; Historical Studies; Indigenous Cultures; Library and Archives; Palaeontology; Technology and Society; CSL collection; Zoology; H. L. White Collection
- Founder: Frederick McCoy
- CEO: Lynley Crosswell
- Website: museumsvictoria.com.au

Museums Victoria is an organisation that includes a number of museums and related bodies in Melbourne, Victoria, Australia. These include the Melbourne Museum, the Immigration Museum, Scienceworks, IMAX Melbourne, a research institute, the UNESCO World Heritage-listed Royal Exhibition Building, and a storage facility in Melbourne's City of Merri-bek.

As the custodian of more than 15 million collection items, Museums Victoria traces the records of the Australasian region. Cultivated over nearly two centuries, this collection enables significant research. Launched in 2022, Museums Victoria Research Institute addresses challenges of the era through a lens of change, drawing on multiple knowledge systems and perspectives to enrich understanding.

Museums Victoria also contains a library collection that holds some of Australia’s rarest and finest examples of 18th and 19th century scientific monographs and serials.

In partnership with First Peoples, Museums Victoria places First Peoples’ living cultures, histories and knowledge at the core of its practice. The organisation continues to embed the values of First Peoples communities into the organisational fabric by working in partnership with Elders and community members to return cultural material and knowledge to Country. Together, they create exhibitions and experiences that connect visitors with knowledge and stories spanning thousands of years, helping today’s generations understand the importance and vibrancy of Aboriginal and Torres Strait Islander cultures.

Museums Victoria manages many tourist attractions in the state with more than 2 million annual visitors. Its outreach programs and digital platforms reach an estimated 10 million people each month. And as a contributor to the Victorian education sector, it provides digital and onsite education programs with a focus on early childhood learning and improving STEM literacy for all.

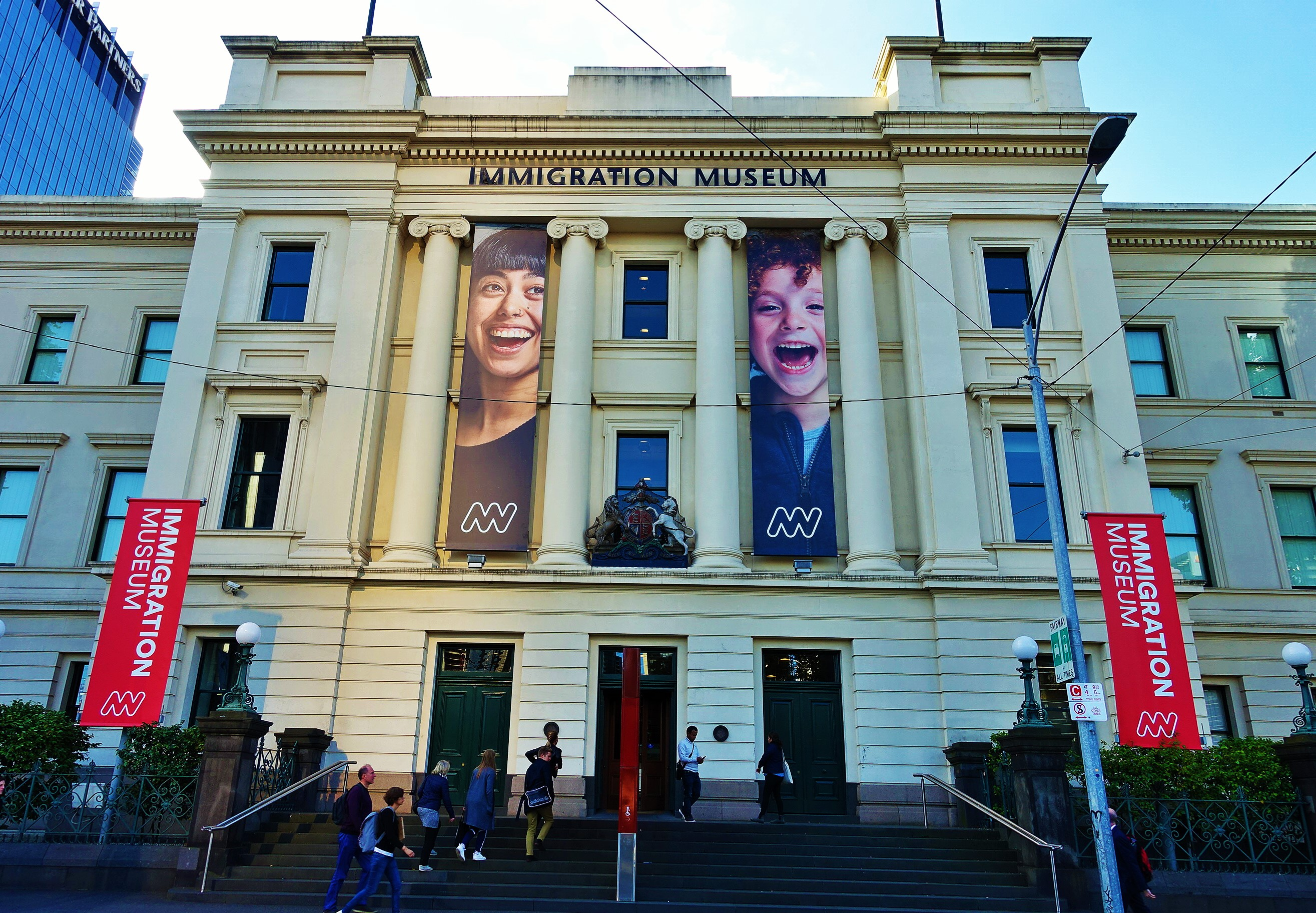
Exterior of the Immigration Museum, which occupies the former Melbourne Customs House.

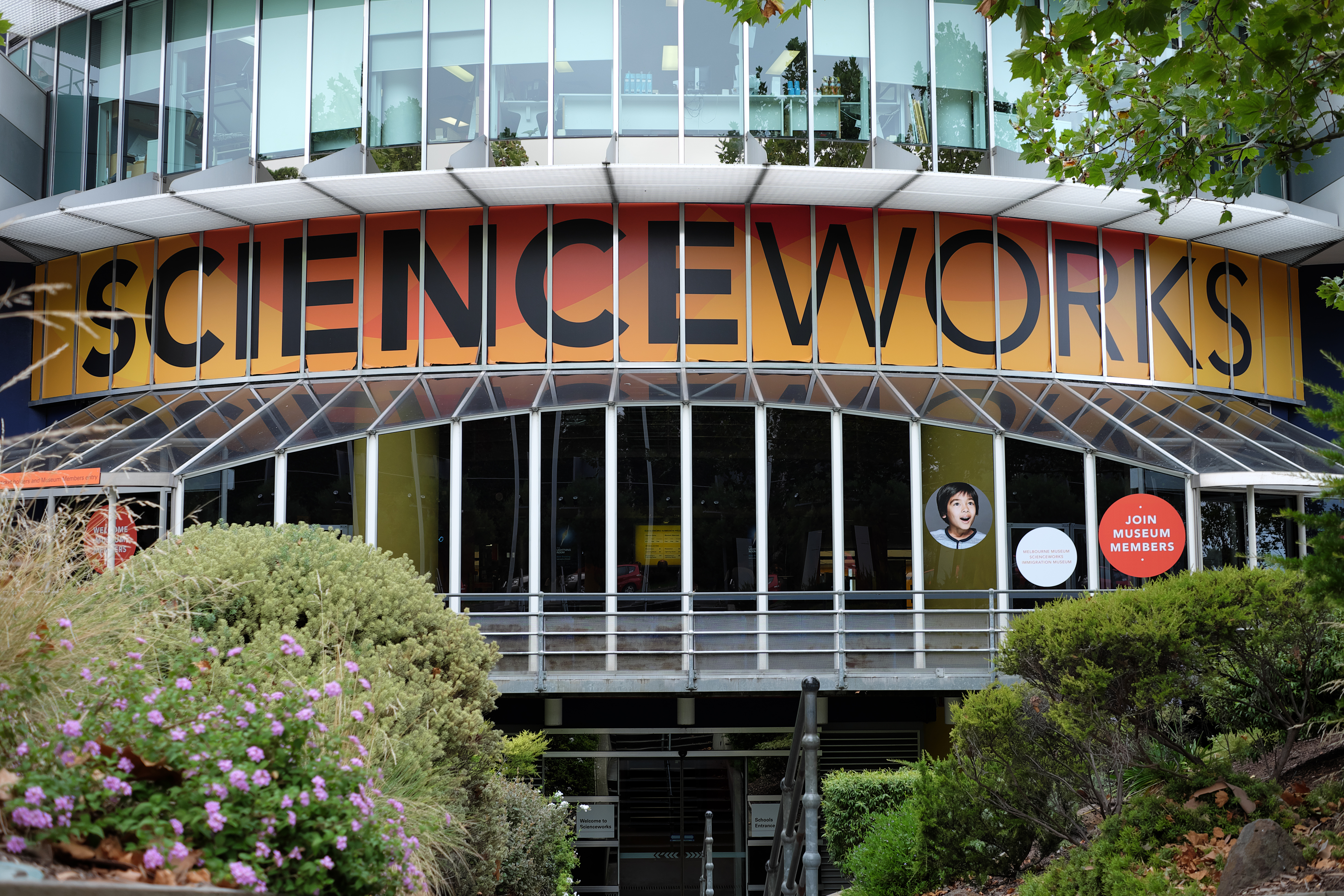
Scienceworks science and Technology Museum

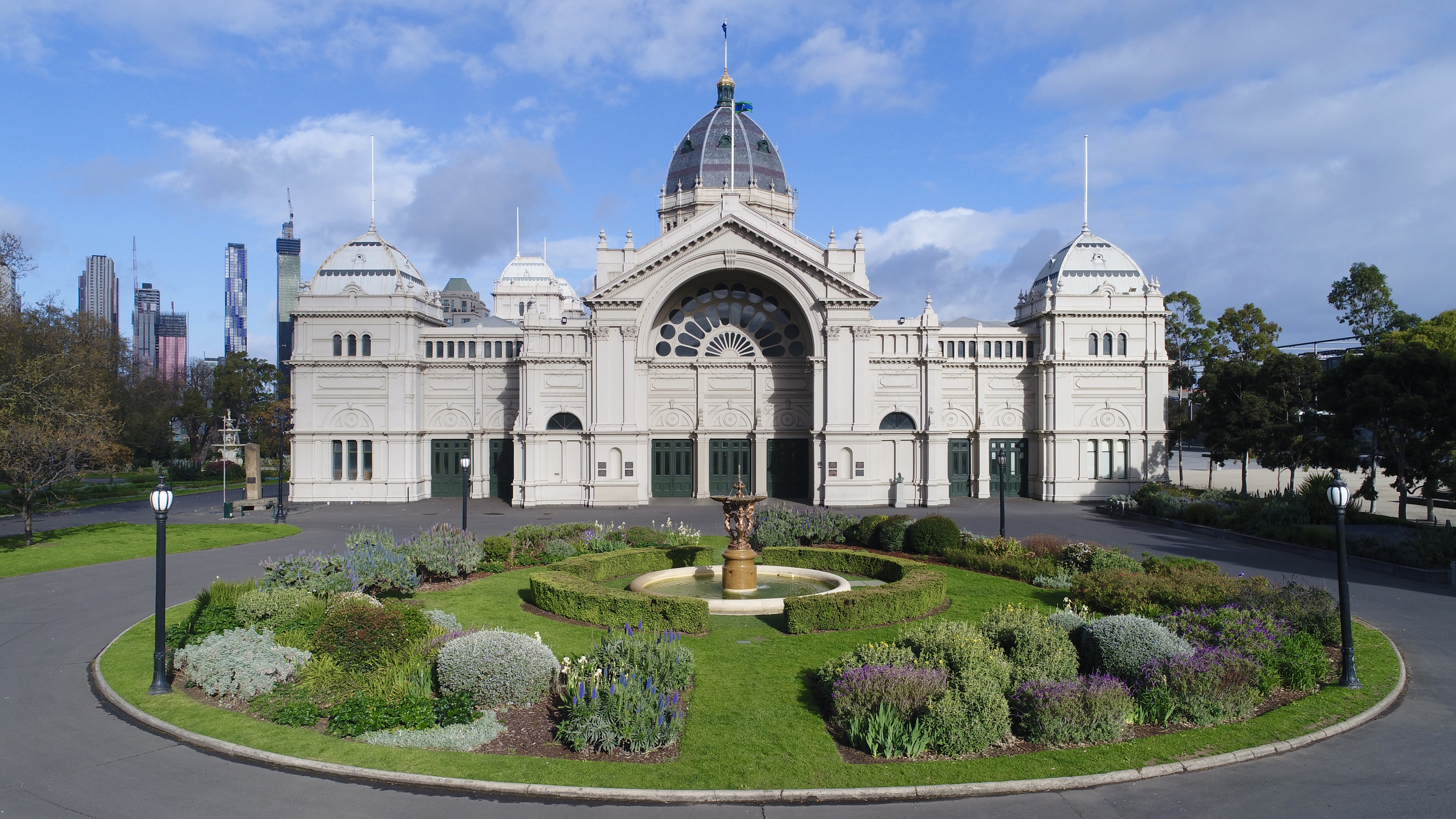
The Royal Exhibition Building, which is a World Heritage listed site.

== History ==
The museum traces its history back to the establishment of the "Museum of Natural and Economic Geology" by the Government of Victoria, William Blandowski and others in 1854.

The Library, Museums and National Gallery Act 1869 incorporated the Museums with the Public Library and the National Gallery of Victoria; but this administrative connection was severed in 1944 when the Public Library, National Gallery and Museums Act came into force, and they became four separate institutions once again.

Museums Victoria was founded in its current form under the Museums Act 1983 (No. 9903). Currently, Museums Victoria's State Collections holds over 17 million items, including objects relating to Indigenous Australian and Pacific Islander cultures, geology, historical studies, palaeontology, technology & society, and zoology Museums Victoria also contains a library collection that holds some of Australia’s rarest and finest examples of 18th and 19th century scientific monographs and serials.

Significant events in the museum's history include:

- 1854 – Founding of the "Museum of Natural and Economic Geology" by William Blandowski and others; Blandowski oversees the museum
- 1856 – Collections moved to the University of Melbourne in Parkville by Frederick McCoy
- 1858 – McCoy appointed first "director" of the museum
- 1862 – New building opens on University site, museum renamed "National Museum of Victoria"
- 1869 – National Museum, embryotic Industrial & Technological (I&T) Museum, National Gallery of Victoria (NGV) and Public Library of Victoria merged into a single body
- 1870 – I&T Museum opened on Swanston Street site (behind the Public Library)
- 1893 – I&T Museum opens new building on Russell St as part of Library complex
- 1899 – National Museum moved to I&T Museum's building, and takes over its mineral collection; rest of I&T Museum put into storage
- 1915 – I&T Museum reopens in Library's now surplus Queens Hall, thanks largely to George Swinburne and John Monash
- 1927 – National Museum acquired the H. L. White Collection of Australian native bird eggs
- 1944 – Museums organisationally re-separated from Library, NGV and each other; all remain in one building
- 1945 – I&T Museum renamed Museum of Applied Science (MAS)
- 1946 – MAS takes over Melbourne Observatory
- 1969 – NGV moves to St Kilda Rd, MAS moves into its old buildings, Library gets back Queens Hall
- 1961 – Museum of Applied Science renamed Institute of Applied Science
- 1971 – Institute of Applied Science renamed Science Museum of Victoria
- 1981 – Museum Station opened, providing train services
- 1983 – National Museum of Victoria and Science Museum of Victoria amalgamated to form the Museum of Victoria (NMV)
- 1992 – Scienceworks opened in Spotswood
- 1997 – Swanston Street campus closed
- 1998 – Museum of Victoria renamed Museum Victoria; Immigration and Hellenic Antiquities Museum opened
- 2000 – Melbourne Museum at Carlton Gardens opened
- 2016 – Museum Victoria renamed Museums Victoria

== Administration ==
The present chief executive officer of Museums Victoria is Lynley Crosswell (formerly Marshall), who was previously the head of the Australian Broadcasting Corporation’s international arm. Crosswell is the first woman to lead the organisation in its history.

Former directors include:

- 1858 – Frederick McCoy
- 1899 – Walter Baldwin Spencer
- 1928 – James A. Kershaw
- 1931 – Daniel James Mahony
- 1957 – Charles. W. Brazenor
- 1962 – John McNally
- 1979 – Barry Wilson
- 1984 – Robert Edwards
- 1990 – Graham Morris
- 1998 – George F. MacDonald
- 2002 – Dr J. Patrick Greene

== State Collection ==
Museums Victoria has been building and researching its collections since 1854, recording Australia's environmental and cultural history.

Currently, Museums Victoria holds a collection of an estimated 15 million items, held in high-quality storage facilities at Melbourne Museum, Scienceworks and a specialised storage facility. Collection managers, conservators and curators research, document and preserve the collections for present and future generations.

Collections are held in these areas: geology, historical studies, indigenous cultures, library, palaeontology, technology and society and zoology.

== Museums Victoria Research Institute ==
Based at Melbourne Museum and Launched in 2022, the Museums Victoria Research Institute has re-imagined how Museums Victoria does research and amplifies its strengths as Australasia’s leading museum organisation to address some of the biggest and most complex challenges of our era.

== Library ==
The Museums Victoria Library collection was first established in the 1850s as a working collection for the Museum's curators, and has developed into one of the best collections of natural history books and journals in Australia. The library was located at Melbourne University until 1906 when it moved, with the museum, to be co-located with the Public Library.

Today, the library collection is located at Melbourne Museum and contains 40,000 titles, which includes around 1,000 titles that are considered to be rare due to one or a combination of factors, including: value; scarcity; aesthetic qualities; historic, scientific or institutional significance; fragility; or age. Collection strengths include natural history in the fields of zoology, geology and palaeontology, scientific expedition reports, society and institutional journal titles, Indigenous cultures of Australia and the Pacific, Australian history, technology, colonial and other exhibition catalogues, museum studies, and Museums Victoria publications.

Many items from the Museums Victoria Library have been digitised for the Biodiversity Heritage Library as Museums Victoria is the home to the Australian node of this project. The digitisation operation is hosted by Museums Victoria and is nationally funded by the Atlas of Living Australia.

== Significant works ==
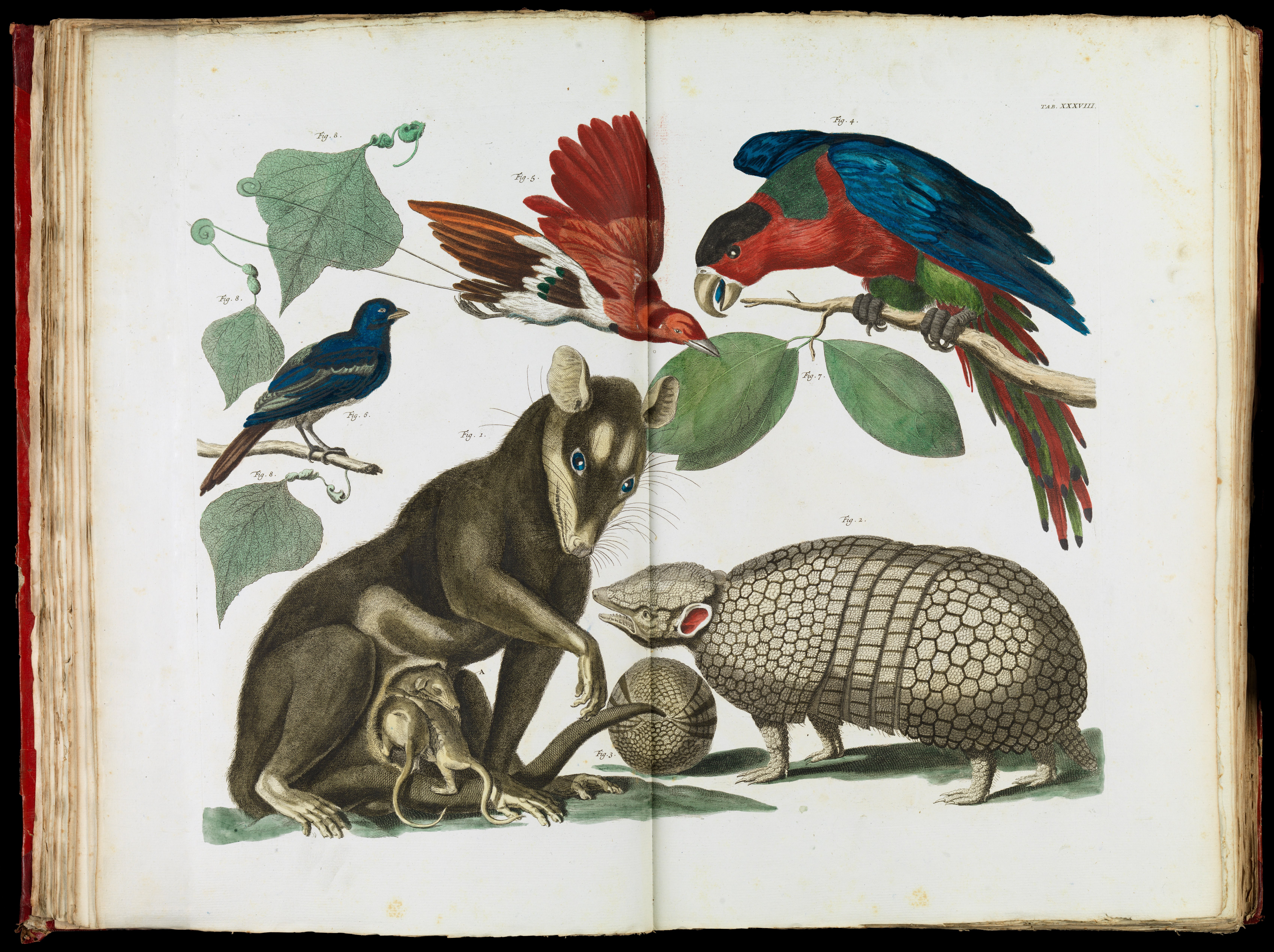
A double plate from Albertus Seba's Thesaurus

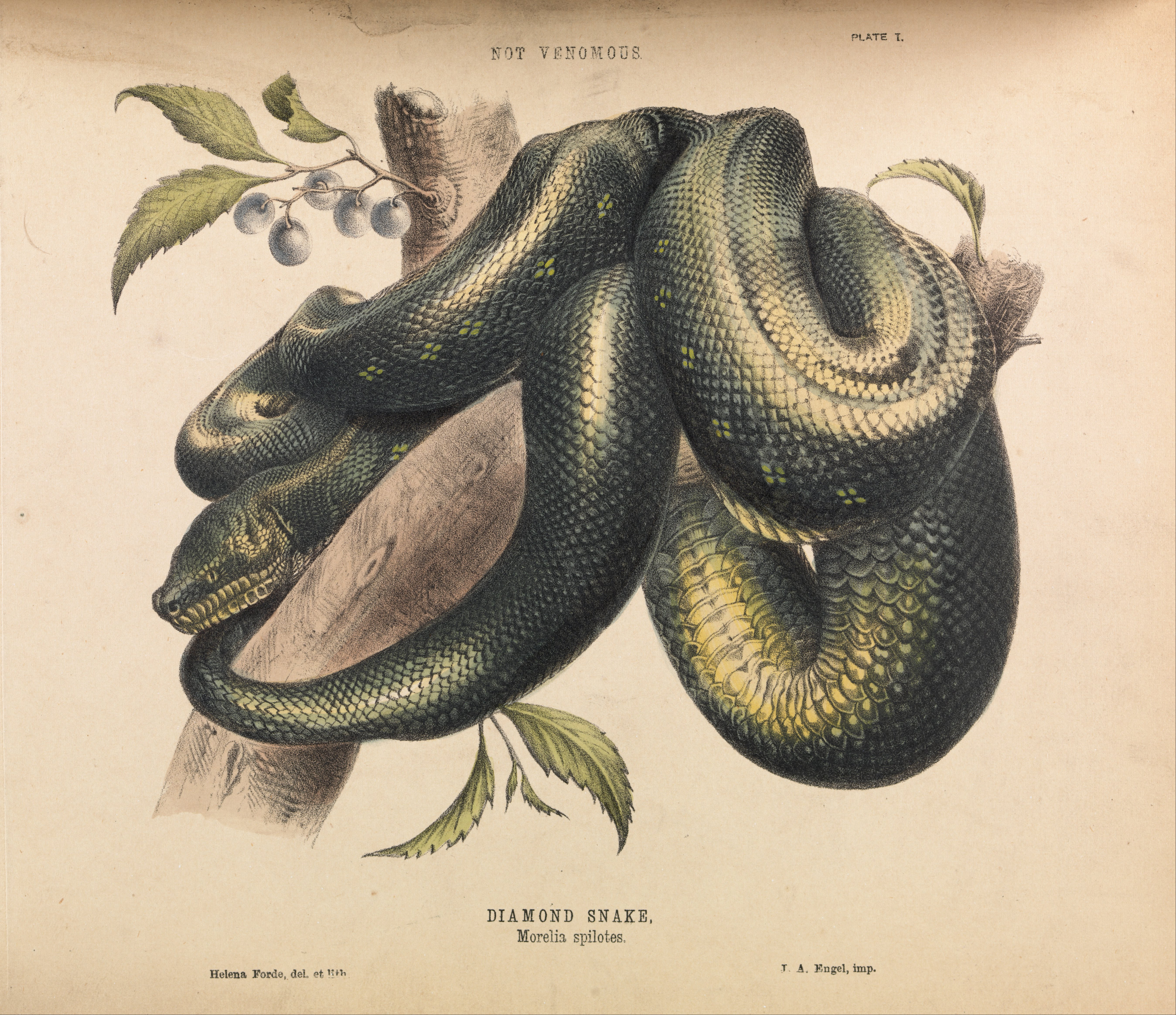
Diamond Snake, Morelia spilotes from The Snakes of Australia by Gerard Krefft

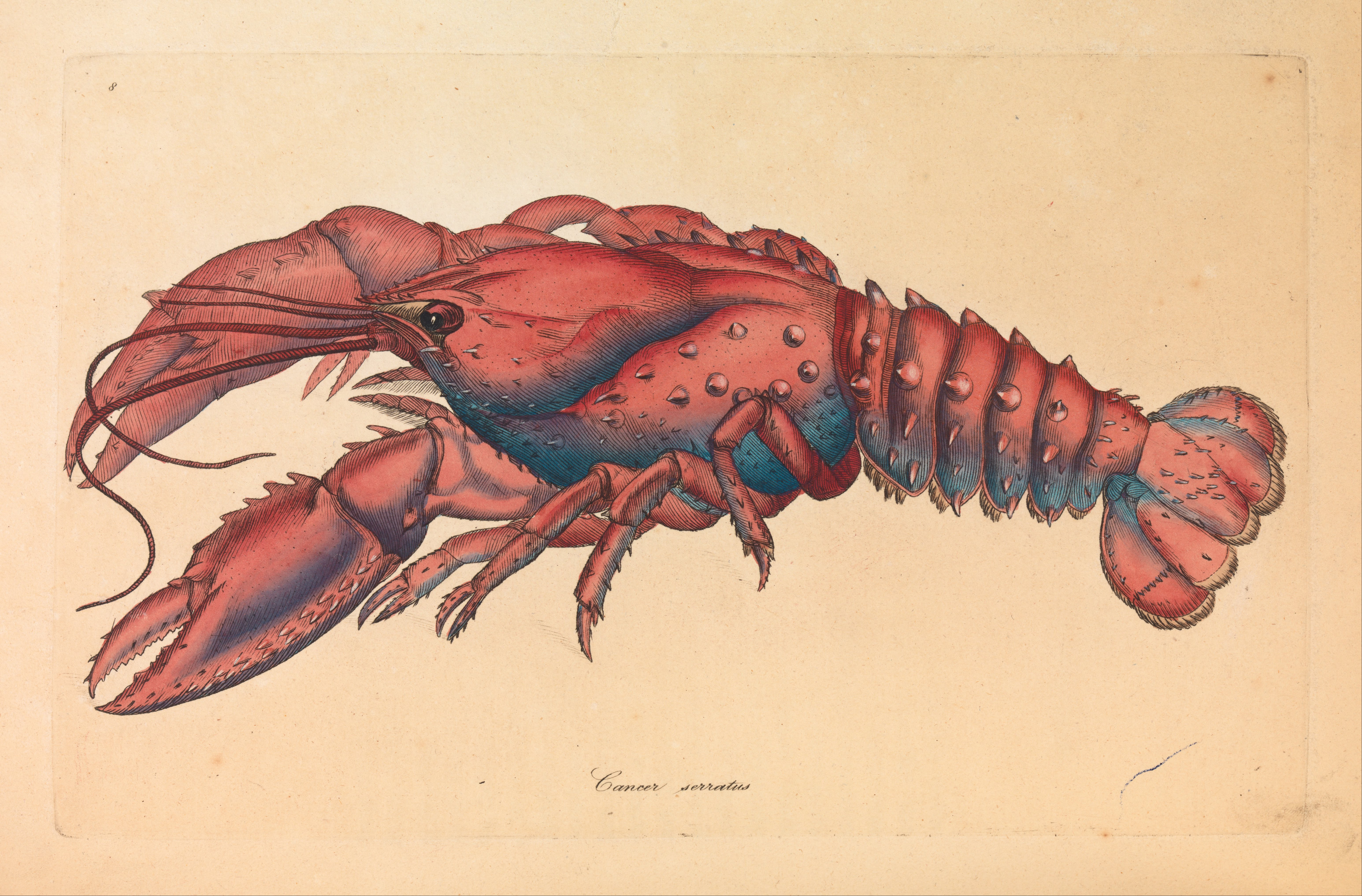
Plate 8 from Zoology of New Holland by George Shaw

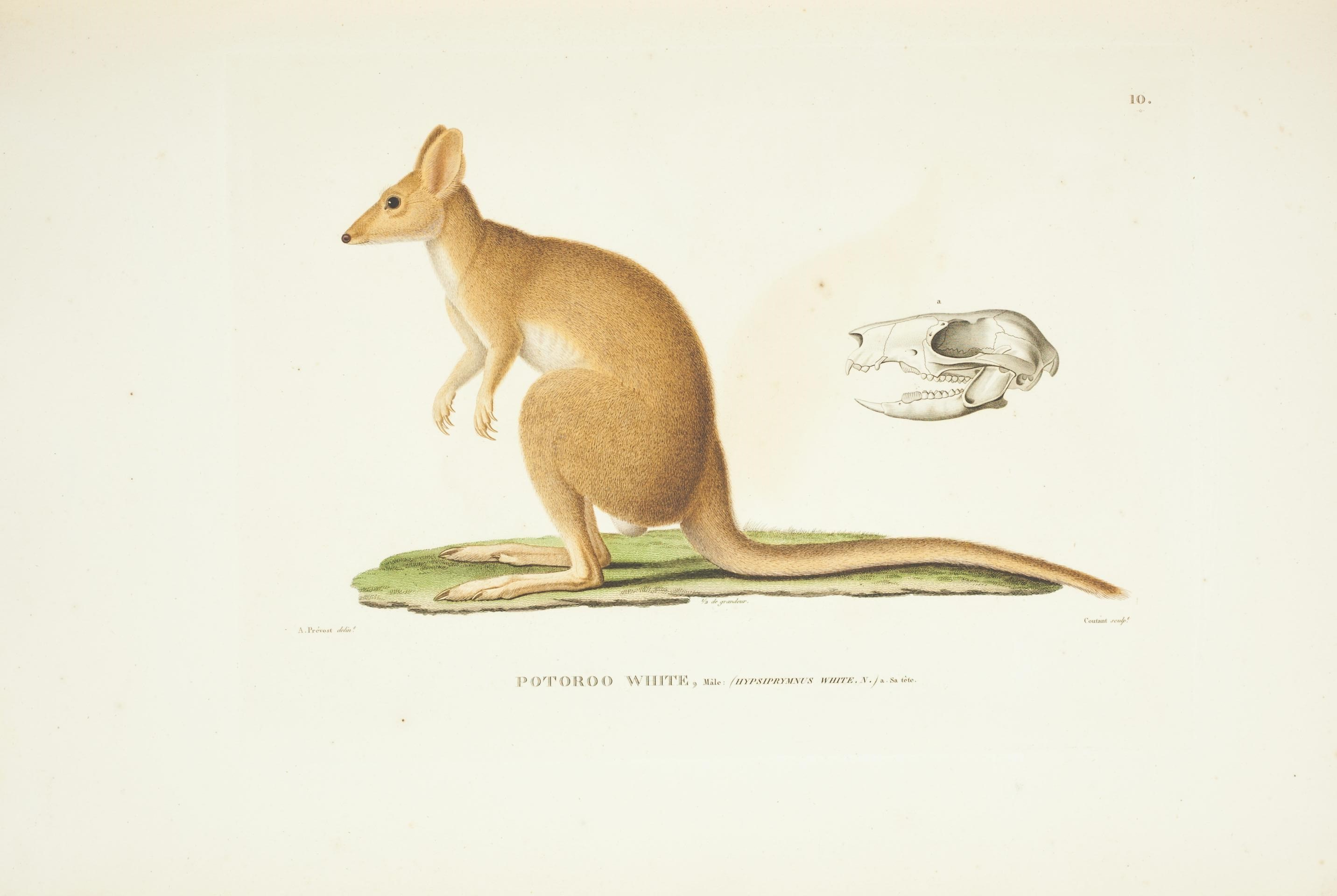
Illustration of a potoroo from Voyage autour du monde by Louis de Freycinet
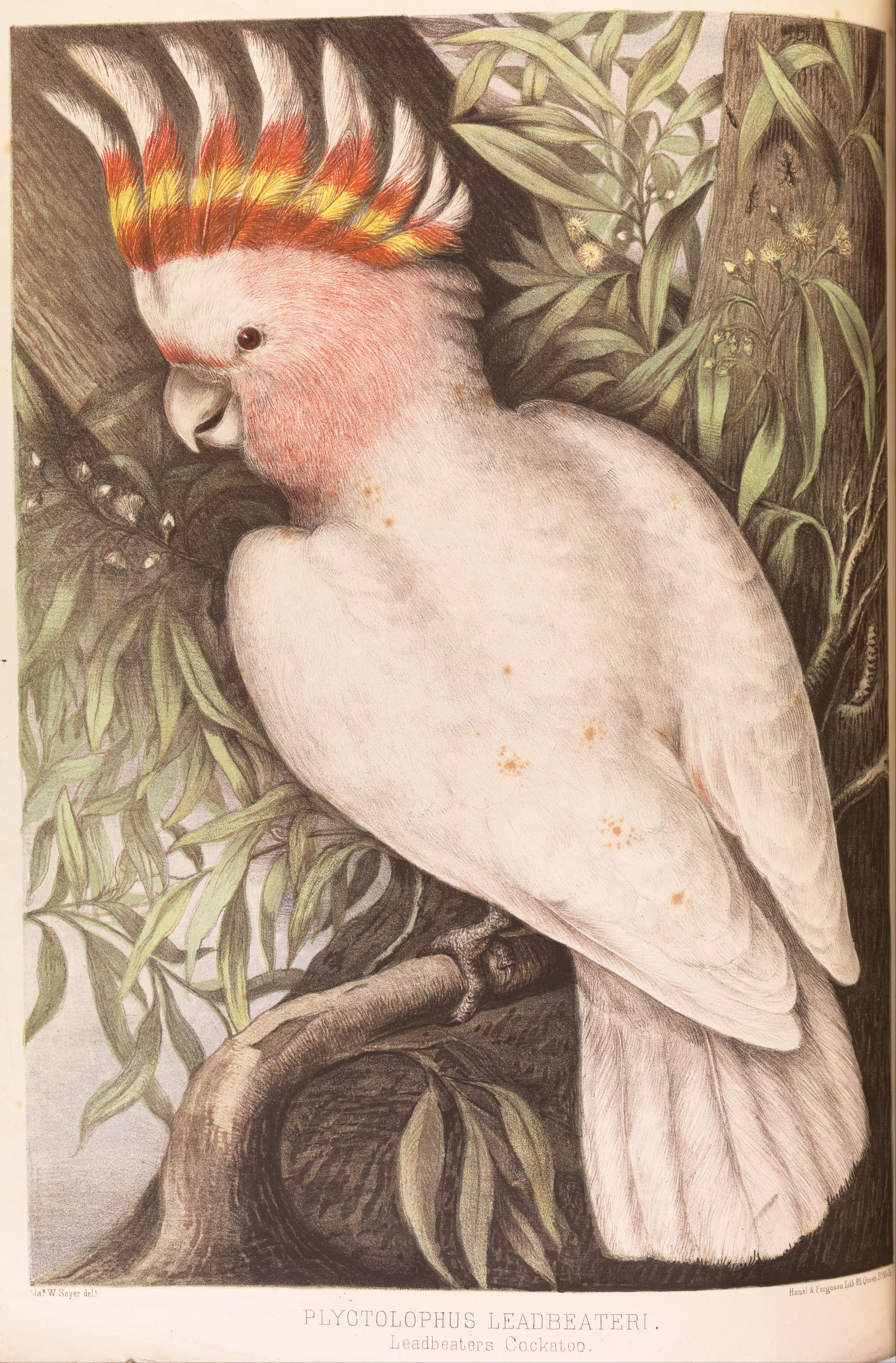
Chromolithograph from A Monograph of the Psittacidae by J.J. Halley

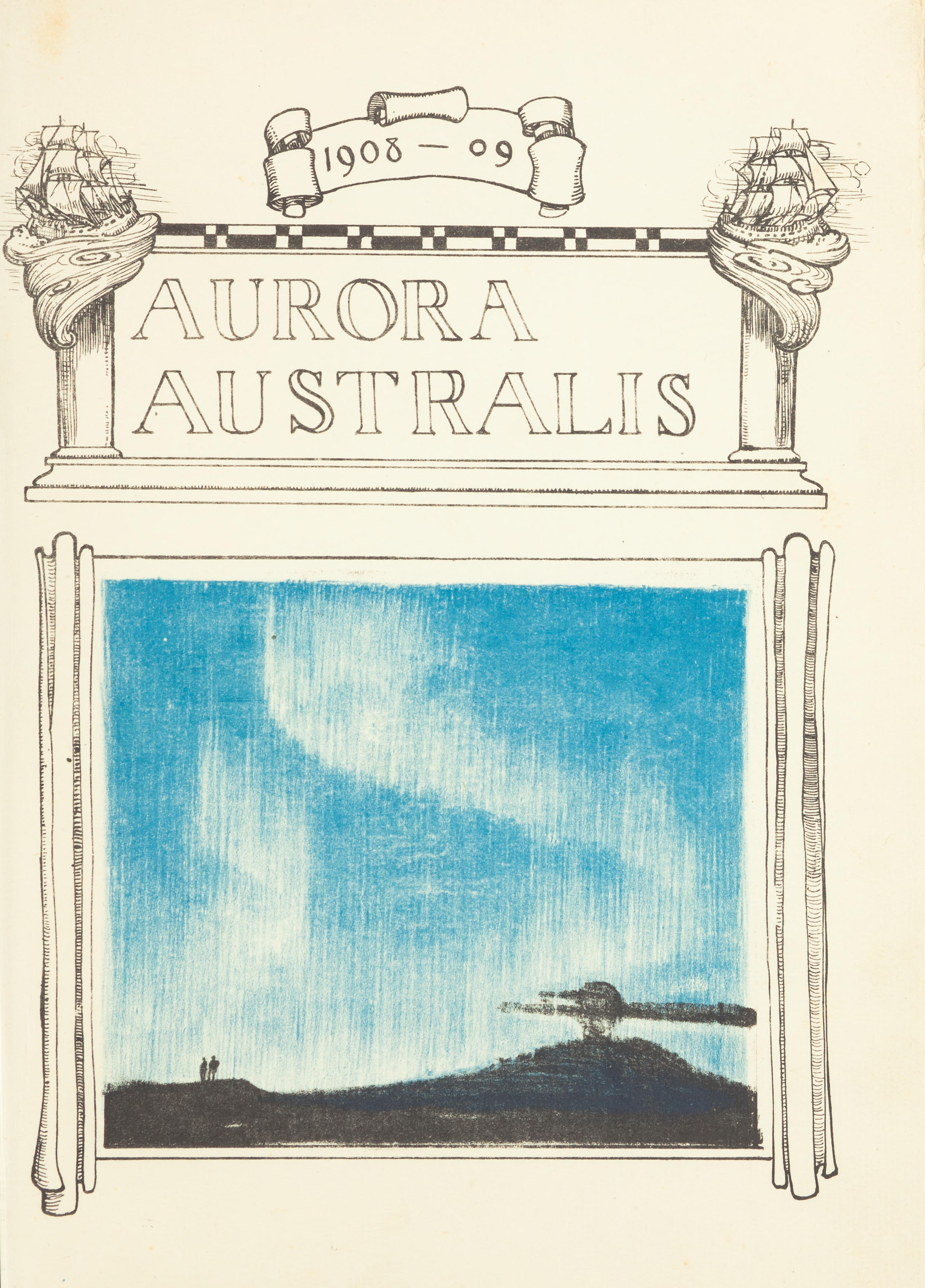
Frontispiece from Aurora Australis

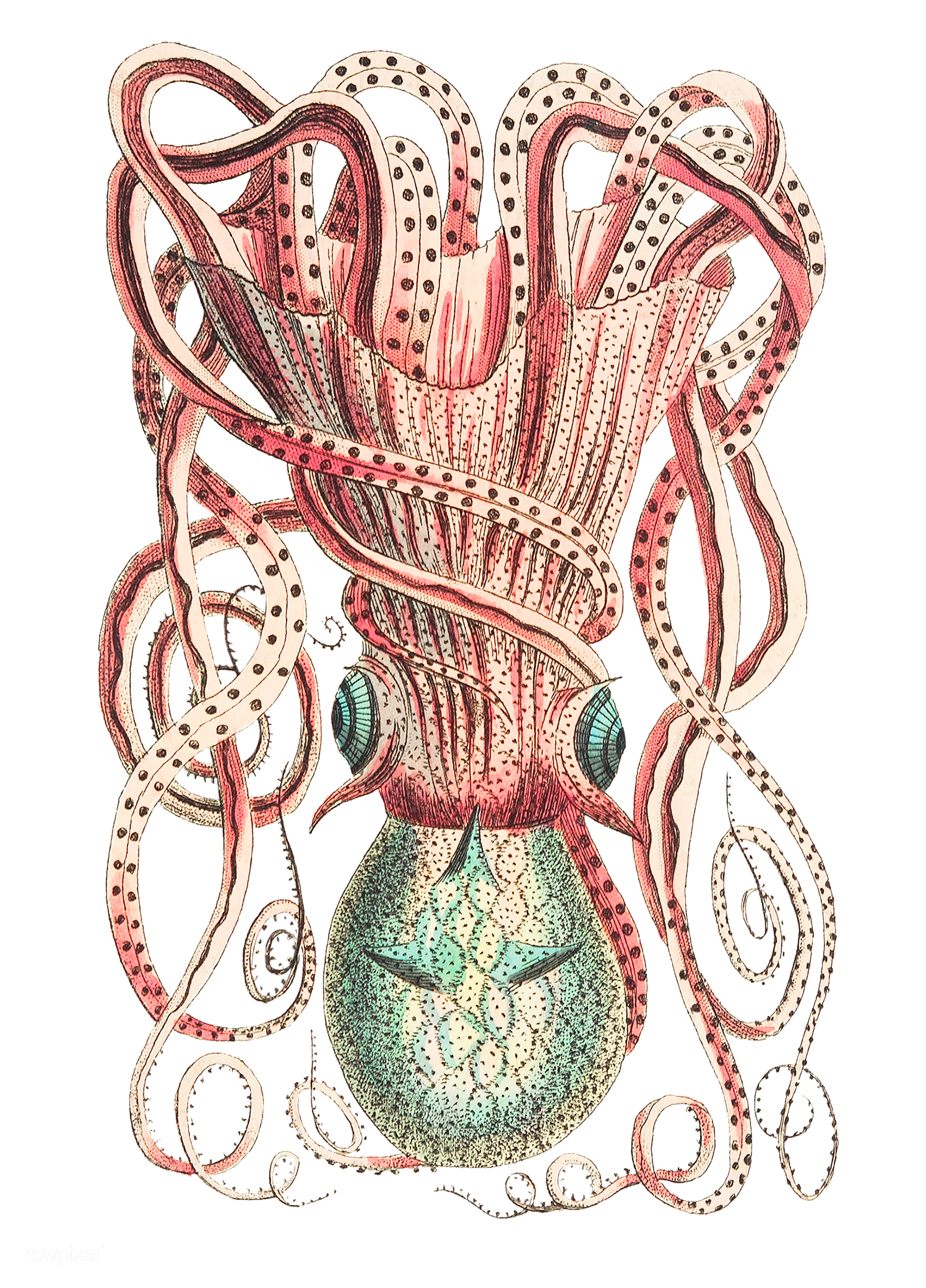
Granulated Cuttle illustration from The Naturalist's Miscellany by George Shaw

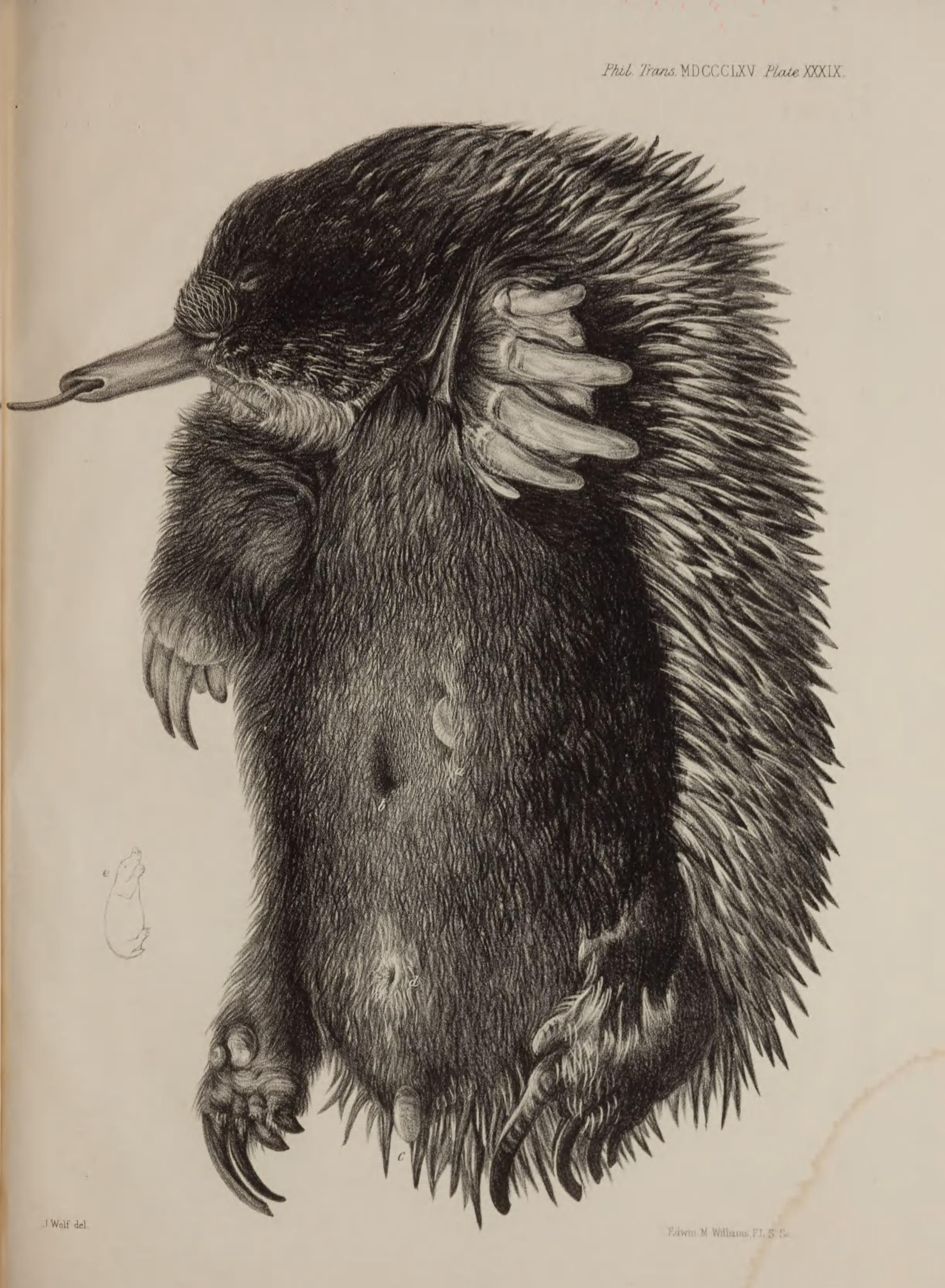
Illustrated plate from On the marsupial pouches, mammary glands and mammary foetus of the Echidna hystrix by Richard Owen

== See also ==
- CSL collection
- H. L. White Collection
- List of museums in Australia
