= Scienceworks (Melbourne) =

Science museum in Melbourne, Australia

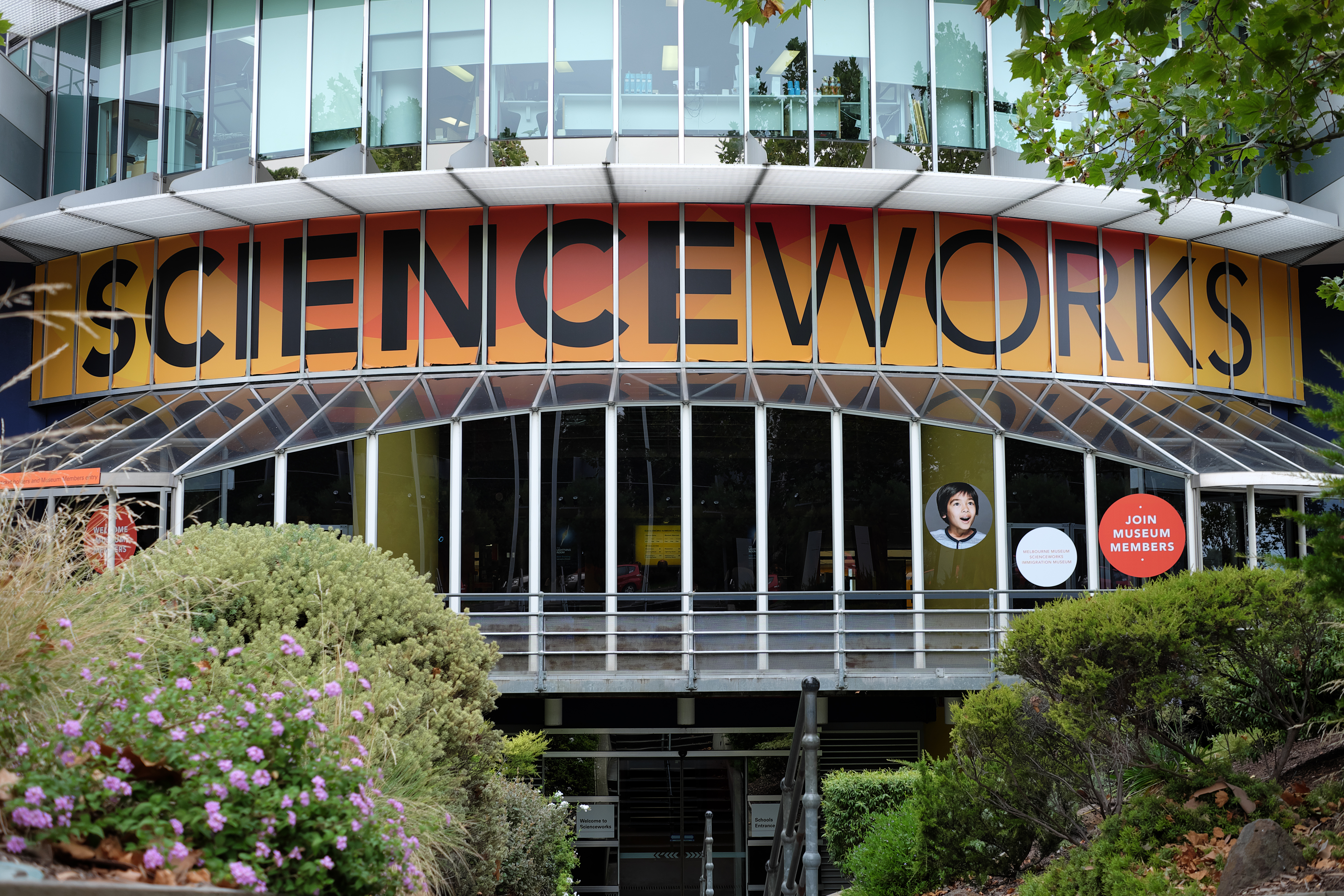
- Established: March 27, 1992; 34 years ago
- Location: 2 Booker St, Spotswood, Melbourne, Australia
- Coordinates: 37.831582°S 144.89394°E
- Type: Science Centre
- Accreditation: Asia Pacific Network of Science & Technology Centres (ASPAC)
- President: Leon Kempler
- CEO: Lynley Crosswell
- Owner: Museums Victoria
- Public transit access: Spotswood
- Website: Scienceworks

Scienceworks is one of Australia’s leading science museums located in Spotswood, a suburb of Melbourne, Victoria. It is one of three museums operated by Museums Victoria. Displays and activities offered by the museum include hands-on experiments, demonstrations, and tours.

Scienceworks is housed in a purpose-built building "styled along industrial lines" near the historic Spotswood Pumping Station, constructed in 1897, whose steam engines form an associated exhibit. The pumping station forms part of the museum complex. Being built on a site shared by the 125-year-old engineering marvel, Scienceworks links Melbourne’s industry, heritage, and applied technology

Scienceworks was built to accommodate 250,000 visitors but pre-pandemic was attracting 500,000 visitors annually.

== History ==
Scienceworks opened on 27 March 1992 while Joan Kirner was premier of Victoria. Its first permanent exhibitions were Inventions, Energy, Travel and Materials. In 1999, the Melbourne Planetarium at Scienceworks opened. It was the first in the Southern Hemisphere to have a digital star projector, as well as digital projection capabilities.

From 1997–2013, the Water Tower Clock, built in 1882, a relic from the original Flinders Street Station was on display at the museum. and later installed at the Southern Cross Station in 2014.

In 2018, the CSIRAC (Commonwealth Scientific and Industrial Research Organisation Automatic Computer) was transferred from the Melbourne Museum to the Think Ahead exhibit.

== Museum ==
=== Facilities ===
The Melbourne Planetarium is housed on site. On Friday nights, movies are shown in the planetarium.

The "lightning Theatre" is a 120-seat auditorium where demonstrations about electricity feature a giant Tesla Coil, capable of generating two million volts of electricity, producing three metre lightning bolts.

=== Exhibit Halls ===
There are both permanent and temporary exhibits at Scienceworks. Permanent exhibits at Scienceworks include

- Think Ahead (opened 5 December 2013), which is about advances in science and the speculative future, Using multiple touch screens and large projections, Melbourne interactive design firm ENESS' future car project encourages users to build a car and all its accoutrements: choices range from amphibious fins, wings, a bamboo chassis or perhaps an invisibility cloak.
- Sportsworks (opened <2000), which is about the science of sports and the movement of the body. Visitors are invited to pit themselves against a simulation of the Olympic 400m gold medallist Cathy Freeman on a 10m dual-lane track.
- Beyond Perception: Seeing the Unseen (opened 2018) is about invisible forces. Upon seeing this exhibit, Dr Kendall Ackley, a member of the team of scientists who discovered gravitational waves in 2016 remarked. “This is unbelievable. It’s everything that I could’ve wanted to show about how this work goes.”
- Ground Up: Building Big Ideas, Together (opened 4 December 2017) is a sensory exhibit for babies to 5-year-olds.

Temporary exhibits in 2026 include

- Museum of the Moon (opened 16 March 2026)
- Colour: See the World in a New Light (opened 21 March 2026)

=== Other ===
The Spotswood Pumping Station, built in the 1890's, and on the Victorian Heritage Register showcases enormous steam engines and boilers, inside a gorgeous building reminiscent of a French mansion.

=== Autism Friendly Museum ===
Scienceworks is an autism friendly museum with social scripts and maps showing high and low sensory spaces in the museum available on their website.

== Gallery ==
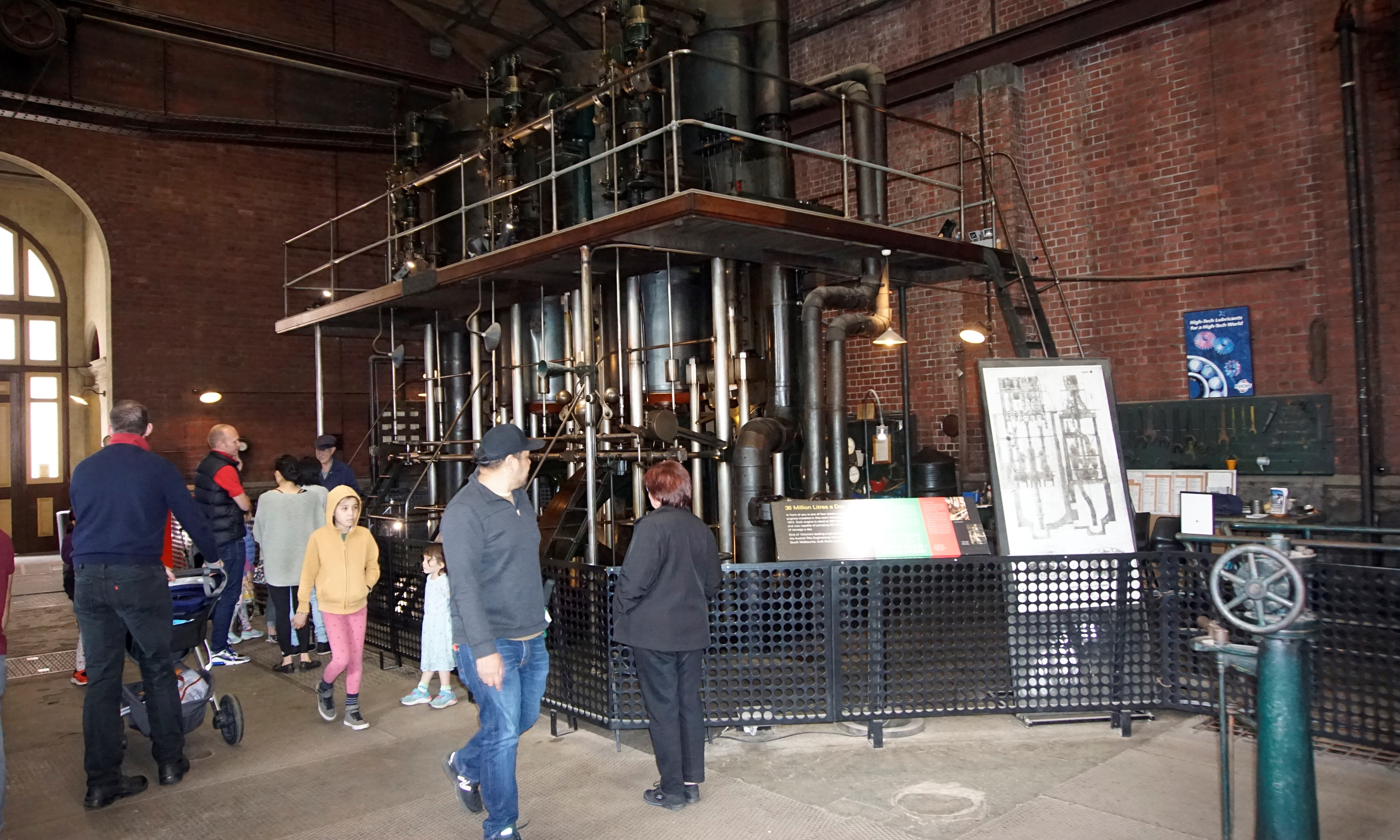
Steam-driven pump engine

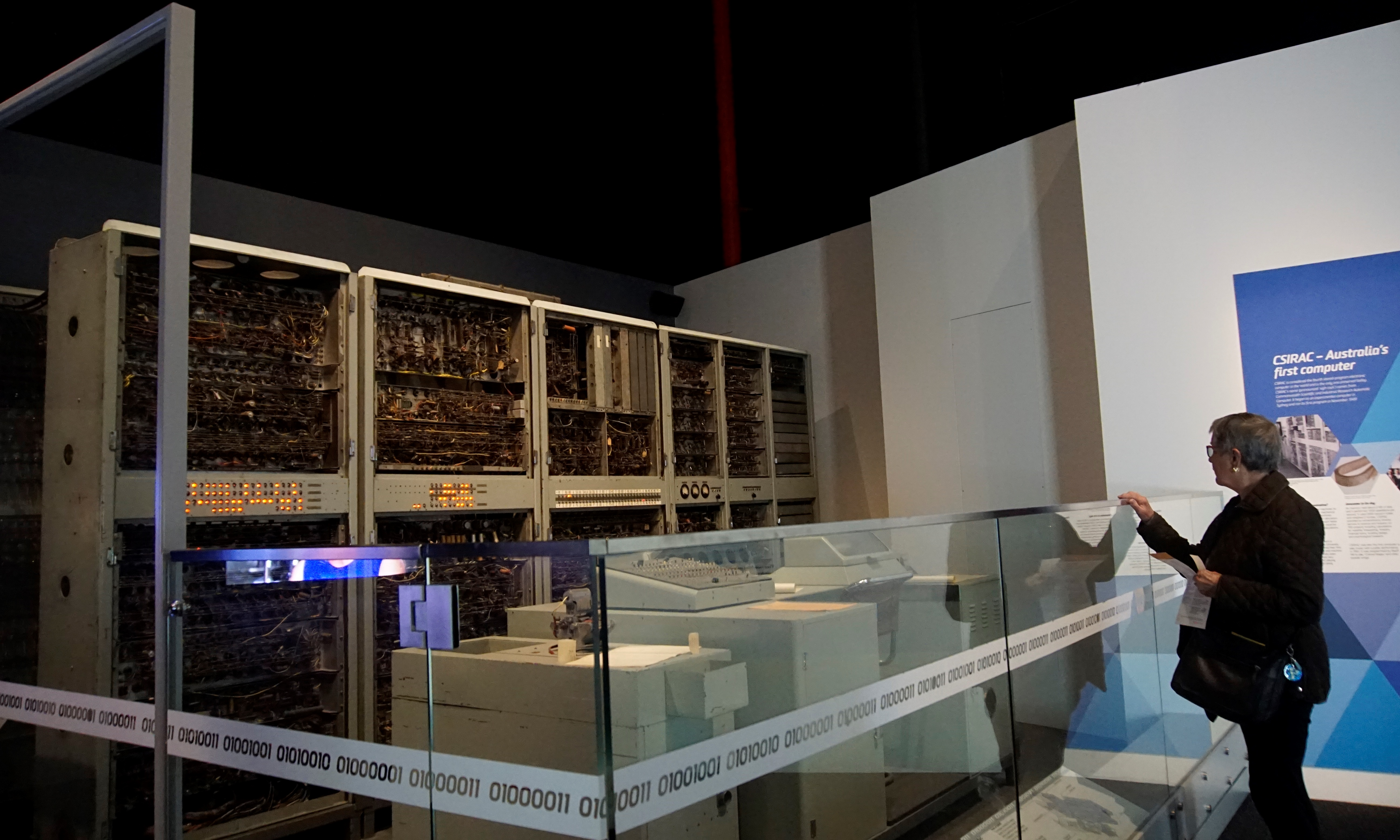
CSIRAC computer display

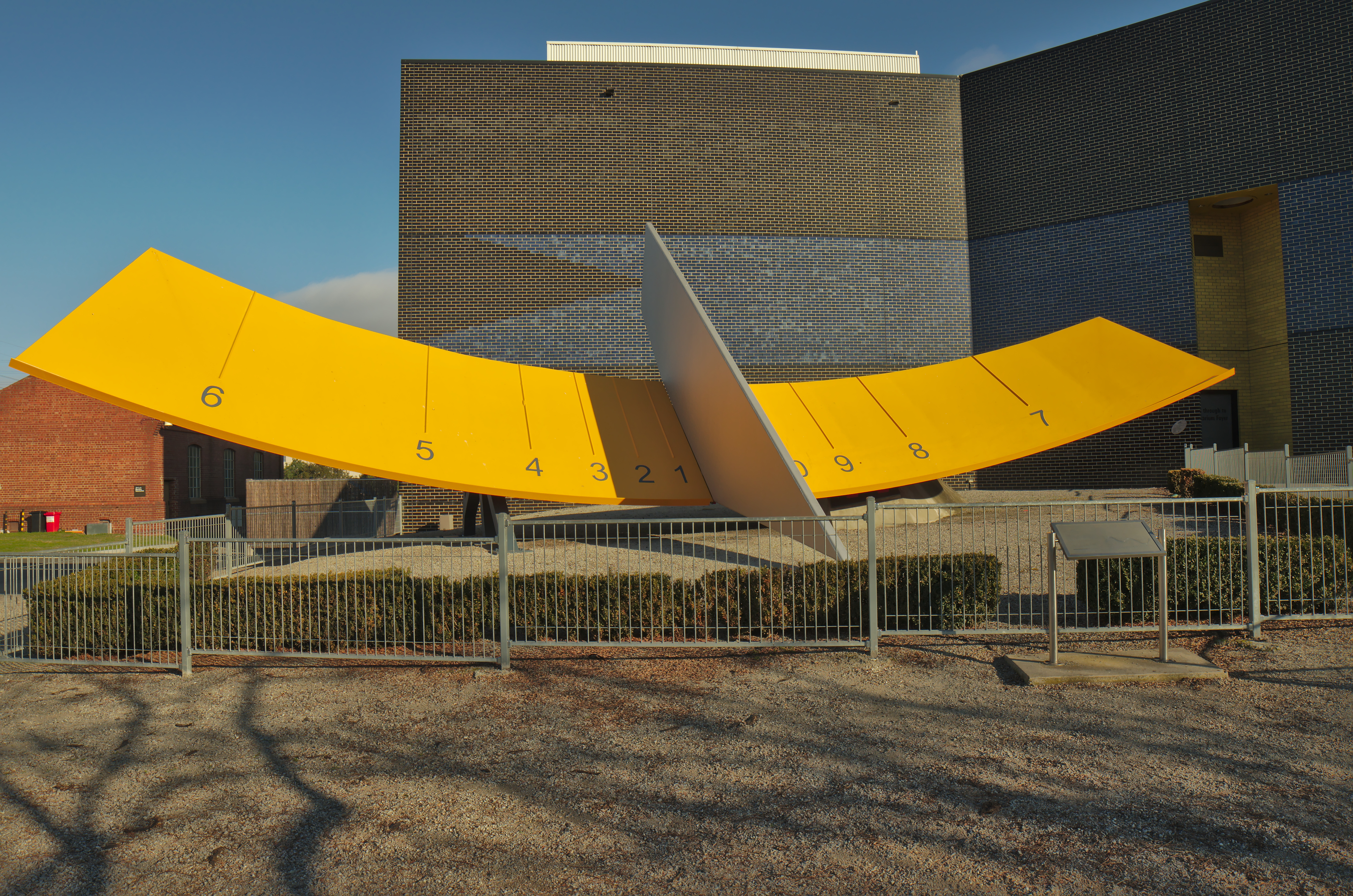
Sundial - Melbourne Planetarium

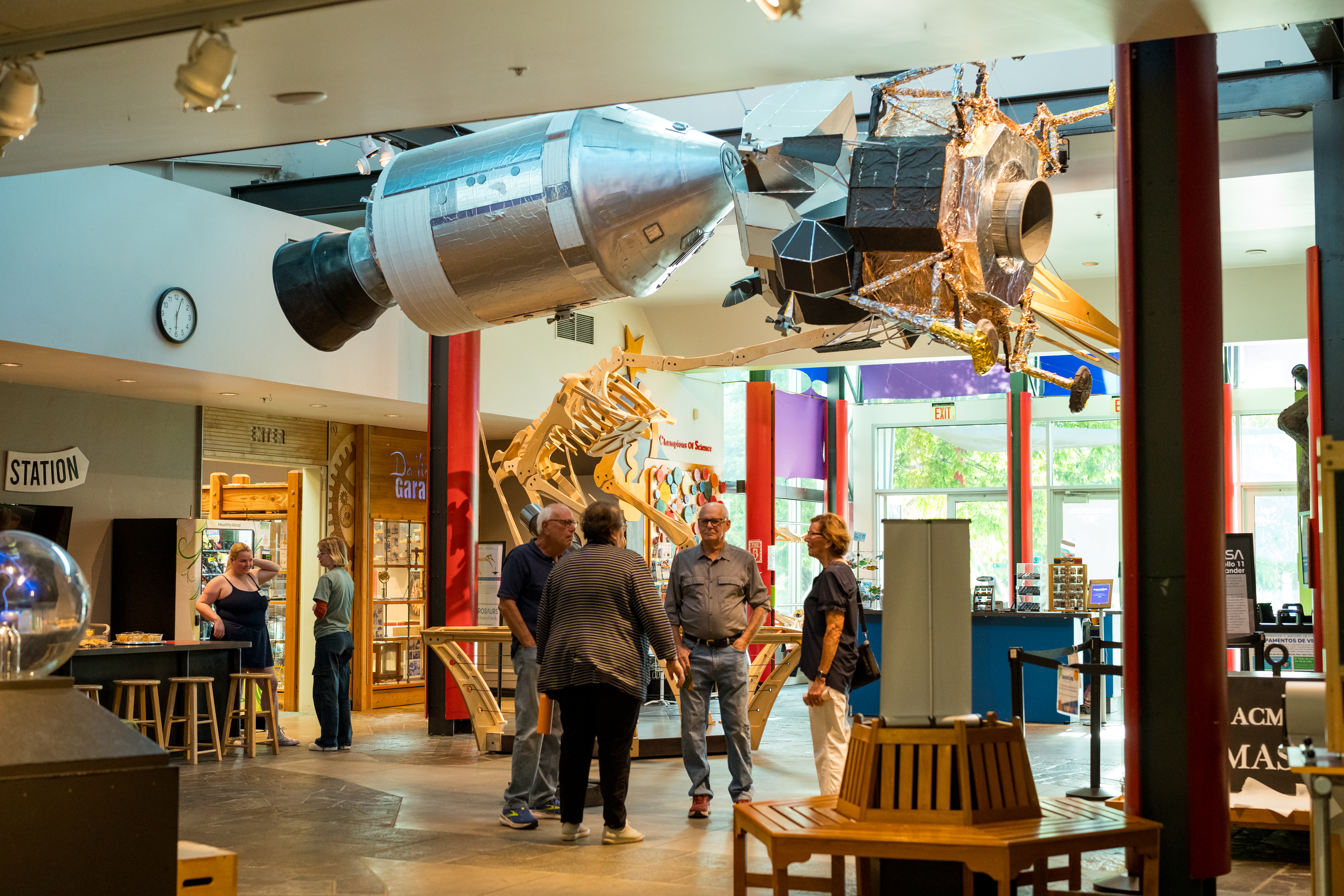
Copy of MDW01606

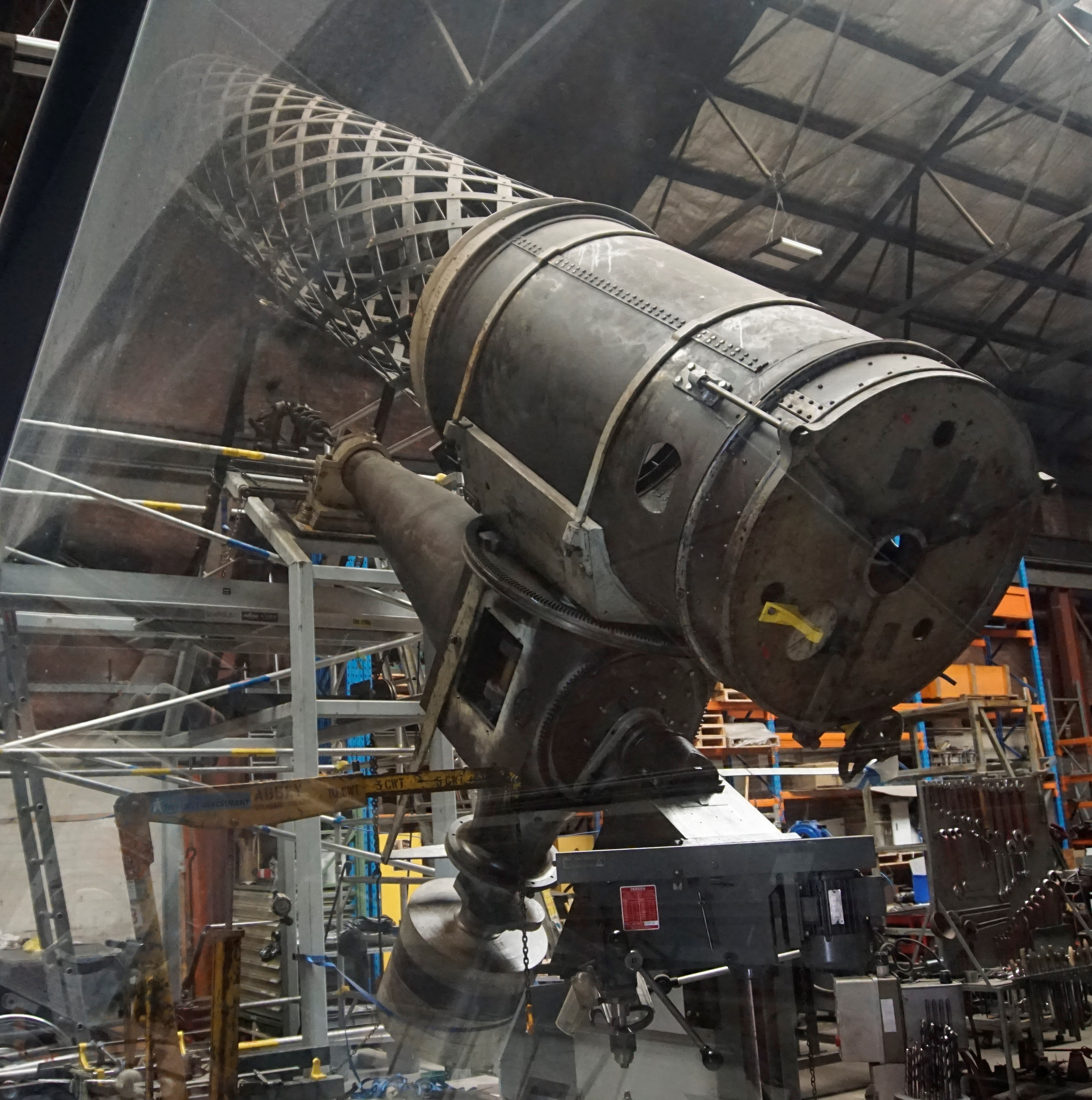
Melbourne astronomical telescope

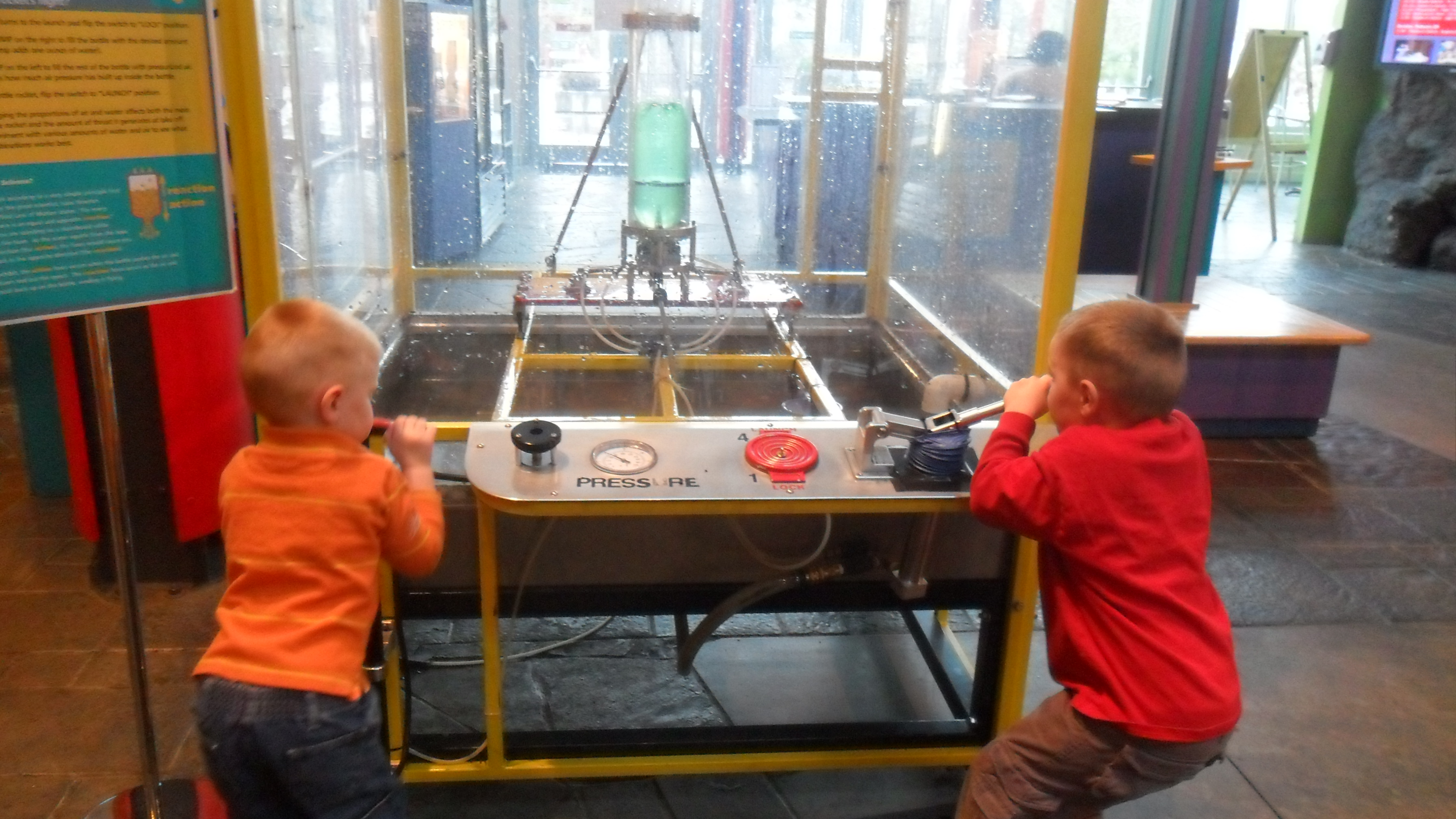
Water Rocket ScienceWorks Museum

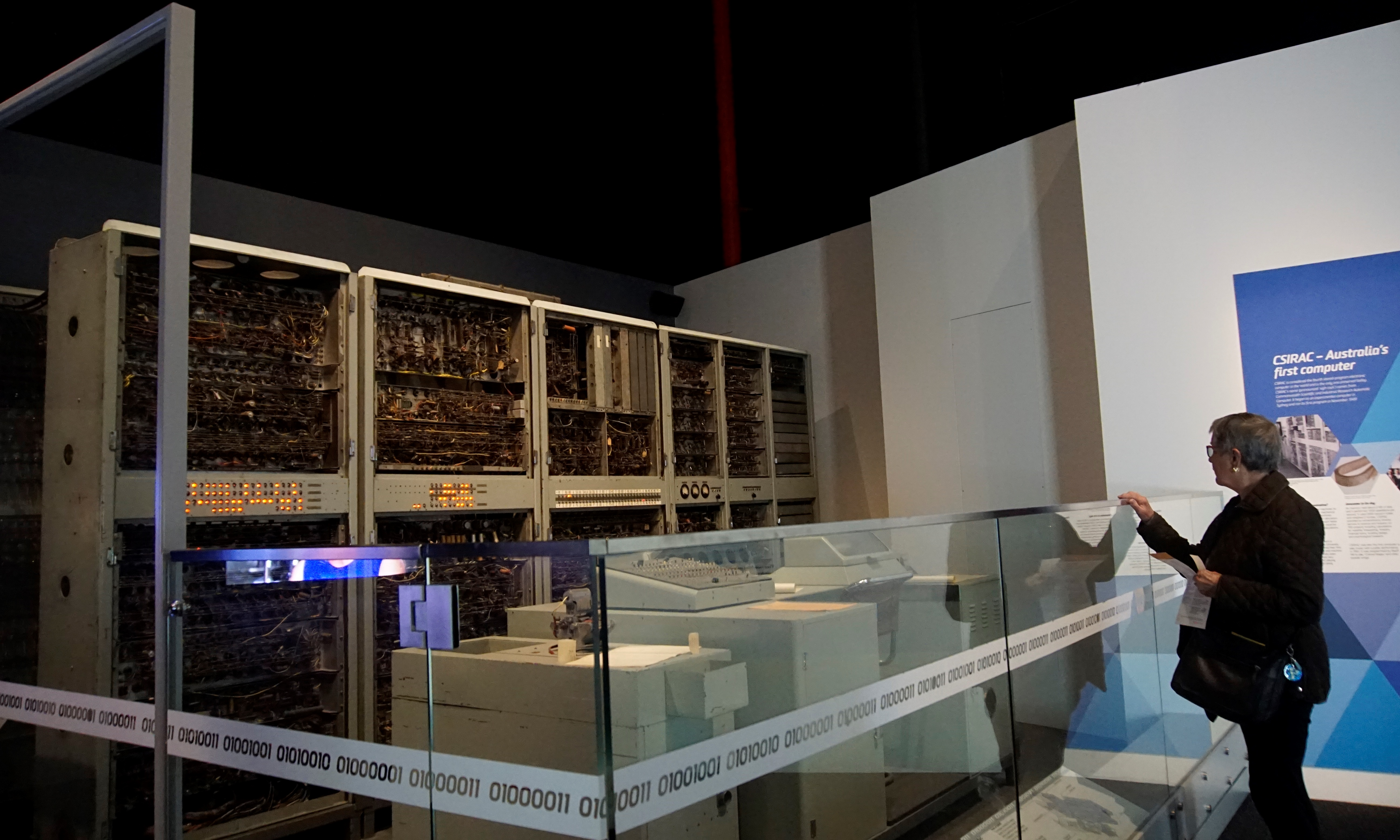
CSIRAC display at Scienceworks, Melbourne

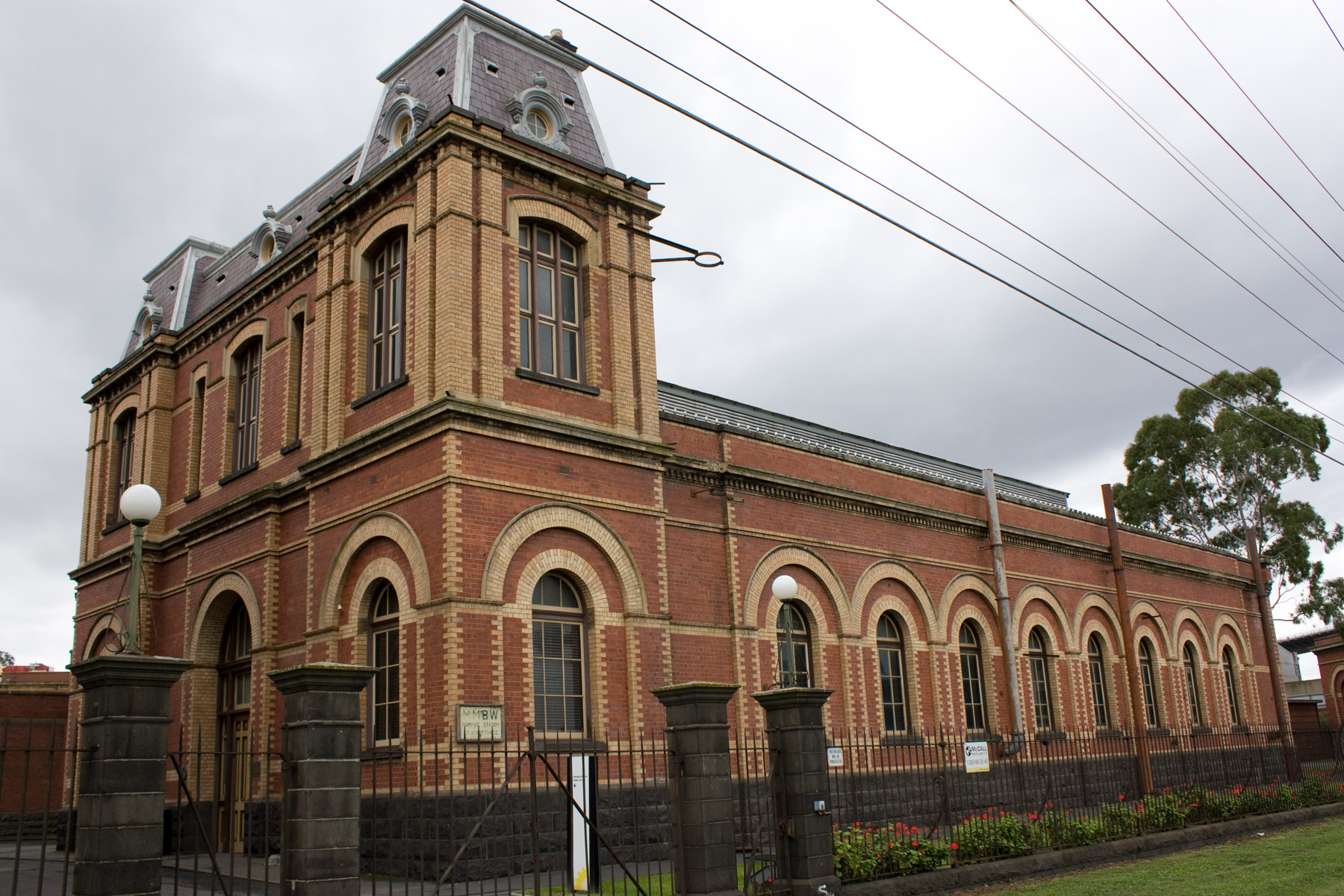
Spotswood Pumping Station
