= Sport in Australia =

In Australia, sport is an important part of the country's culture and dates back to the early colonial period. The first of the country's mainstream sports to become established in order of their organisation were cricket, football, rugby union, tennis, soccer, basketball, netball and rugby league. According to Ausplay, in 2024 the most practiced physical activities for Australians were walking including bushwalking, fitness, running, cycling, pilates and yoga each practised by more than a million adults. The most played team sports in order of participation are soccer, basketball, football, cricket, netball and touch rugby league each played by as many as half a million adults. Soccer and basketball, in particular have more than a million adult players are also the most popular team activities for children. Running, tennis and golf are the most popular individual sports among Australians with more than a million participants. Running and walking in particular have grown rapidly in popularity with the community organisation parkrun registering more than 1 million Australian participants since 2011.

Australia has a number of professional sport leagues, including the Australian Football League (AFL) and AFL Women's (football), National Rugby League (NRL) and NRL Women's (rugby league), Super Rugby Pacific (Australia/New Zealand) (rugby union), the National Basketball League and the Women's National Basketball League, A-League Men and A-League Women (soccer), the Australian Baseball League (baseball), the Big Bash League (cricket), Women's Big Bash League (cricket) and Sheffield Shield (cricket), Suncorp Super Netball and the Supercars Championship (touring car racing). Australia has a culture of attendance to sports with some of the highest per capita attendances in the world. Australian rules football is the most attended sport with the 2024 AFL season attracting an attendance of more than 8.2 million. Rugby league is the most watched on television with a cumulative audience of over 174 million in 2023.

Australian rules football and cricket are Australia's national sports. The Australian national cricket team competed against England in the first Test match (1877) and the first One Day International (1971), and against New Zealand in the first Twenty20 International (2004), winning all three games. It has also won the men's Cricket World Cup a record six times.

Australia's football code culture features a distinct geographical split (known as the Barassi Line) between areas where rugby league and Australian rules football are the dominant codes (the north east and south west respectively) however this has become less evident over time with the expansion of national professional competitions. These two codes are generally played in winter whereas soccer, despite being the most popular in terms of participation, is played in summer to avoid a clash with the two major codes for spectators.

Australia's sporting culture is heavily influenced by sports betting, with the government estimating that over half a million Australians spend up to $1,000 a year in bets. Sports that feature betting, including horse racing, and the national football leagues are especially popular. Gambling features heavily in sports advertising. Two sporting events have public holidays, though only in Victoria, the Melbourne Cup (since 1876) and AFL Grand Final (since 2015). An unofficial public holiday was also declared when Australia won the 1983 America's Cup.

As a nation, Australia has competed in many international events, including the Olympics and Paralympics. The country has also twice hosted the Summer Olympics in Melbourne (1956) and Sydney (2000), as well as the Commonwealth Games on five occasions. A third Olympics will be held in Brisbane in 2032.

The city of Melbourne is famous for its major sports events and has been described as the 'sporting capital of the world', and one of its stadiums, the Melbourne Cricket Ground, is considered the home of Australian rules football and one of the world's premier Cricket grounds. Australia is considered one of the best sports nations in the world.

== History ==
"Australia's sporting history is marked by great successes, great stories and truly great moments. Sport speaks a universal language in this country – we are a nation of players and enthusiasts."

— Kevin Rudd, January 2008

=== Colonial era ===
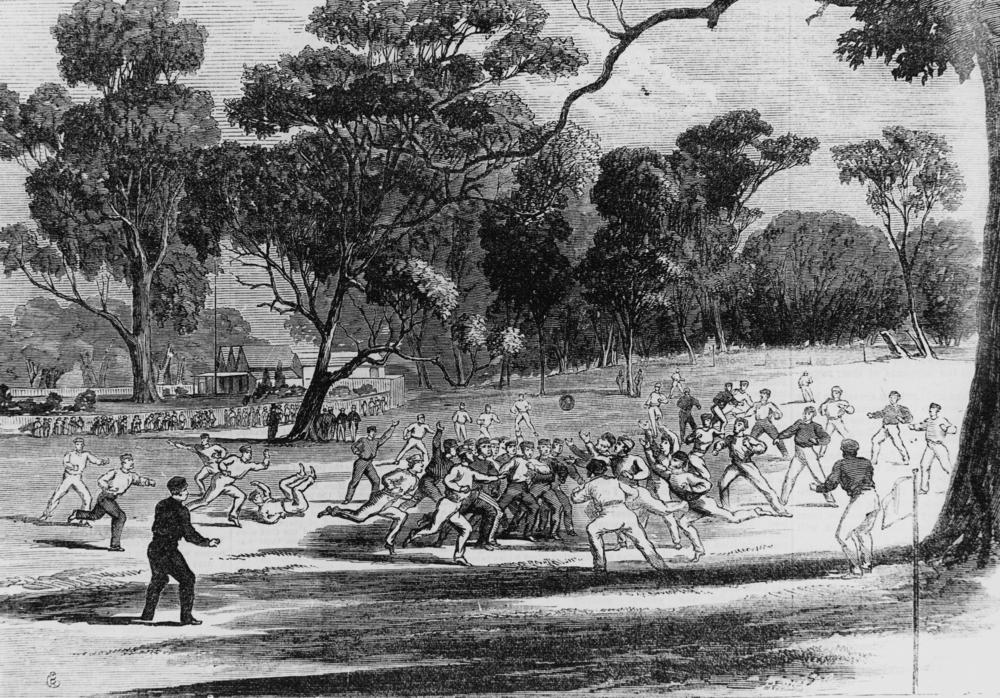
An 1860s game of Australian rules football at the Richmond Paddock. A pavilion of the MCG seen on the left in the background. (Wood engraving made by Robert Bruce in 1866.)

Sport came to Australia in 1810 when the first athletics tournament was held; soon after cricket, horse racing and sailing clubs and competitions started. Australia's lower classes would play sports on public holidays, with the upper classes playing more regularly on Saturdays. Sydney was the early hub of sport in the colony. Early forms of football were played there by 1829. Early sport in Australia was played along class lines. In 1835, the British Parliament banned blood sports except fox hunting in a law that was implemented in Australia; this was not taken well in the country as it was seen as an attack on the working classes. By the late 1830s, horse racing was established in New South Wales and other parts of the country, and enjoyed support across class lines. Gambling was part of sport from the time horse racing became an established sport in the colony. Horse racing was also happening in Melbourne at Batman's Hill in 1838, with the first race meeting in Victoria taking place in 1840. Cricket was also underway with the Melbourne Cricket Club founded in 1838. Sport was being used during the 1830s, 1840s and 1850s as a form of social integration across classes. Victorian rules football (later known as Australian rules) was codified in 1859. Australian football clubs still around in the current Australian Football League were founded by 1858. Originally formed as the South Australian Football Association on 30 April 1877, the SANFL (South Australian National Football League) is the oldest surviving football league of any code in Australia. The Melbourne Cricket Ground, Australia's largest sporting arena, opened in 1853. The Melbourne Cup was first run in 1861. A rugby union team was established at the University of Sydney in 1864. Regular sport did not begin to be played in South Australia, Tasmania and Western Australia until the late 1860s and early 1870s.

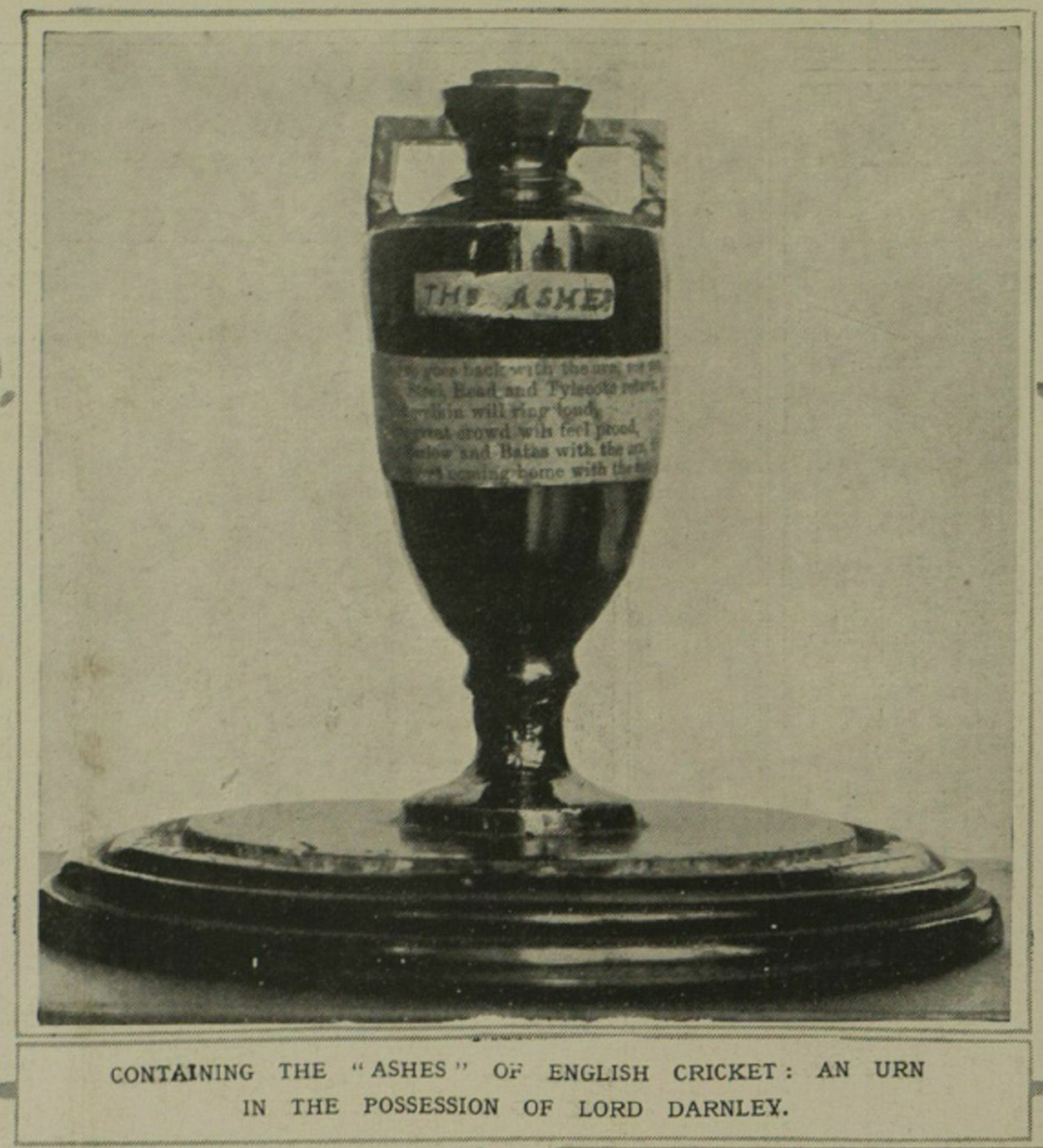
Early photo of the Ashes Urn, from the Illustrated London News, 1921

The first Australian cricket team to go on tour internationally did so in 1868. The Australian side was an all Aboriginal one and toured England where they played 47 games, where they won 14 games, drew 19 and lost 14.Australia's adoption of sport as a national pastime was so comprehensive that Anthony Trollope remarked in his book, Australia, published in 1870, "The English passion for the amusements which are technically called 'sports', is not a national necessity with the Americans, whereas with the Australians it is almost as much so as home."

The first team formally organised soccer team was formed in Sydney in 1880 and was named the Wanderers. Sport was receiving coverage in Australian newspapers by 1876 when a sculling race in England was reported in the Sydney Morning Herald. In 1877, Australia played in the first Test Cricket match against England. In 1882, The Ashes were started following the victory of the Australia national cricket team over England. Field hockey teams for men and women were established by 1890. The Sheffield Shield cricket competition was first held in 1891 with New South Wales, Victoria and South Australia participating in the inaugural competition. The remaining states would not participate until much later, with Queensland first participating in 1926–27, Western Australia in 1947–48 and Tasmania in 1982–83. In 1897 the Victorian Football League, which later became the AFL the Australian Football League, was founded after breaking away from the Victorian Football Association.

The first badminton competition in Australia was played in 1900. The first ice hockey game was played in Melbourne on 12 July 1906 between a local Melbourne team and a team from the crew of the visiting US warship USS Baltimore.

Motor racing began in the first years of federation with motorcycle racing beginning at the Sydney Cricket Ground in 1901 with automobile motorsport following in 1904 at Aspendale Racecourse in Melbourne. A dedicated race track was added to Aspendale's horse racing track in 1906, although it fell into disuse almost immediately.

Rugby league has been the overwhelmingly dominant rugby code in Australia since 1908 (this position remains unchallenged to this day). When Messenger and the All Golds returned from Great Britain in 1908, they helped the new clubs adapt to the rules of rugby league prior to the inaugural 1908 NSWRFL season. The Queensland Rugby Football League also formed early in 1908 by seven rugby players who were dissatisfied with the administration of the Queensland Rugby Union. The Australia national rugby union team had their first international test against New Zealand in 1903, and first international tour in 1908, earning their nickname of the Wallabies after two British journalists used it to refer to the team. The team won gold at the 1908 Summer Olympics; however the majority of the squad joined rugby league clubs upon returning to Australia.

Women represented Australia for the first time at the Olympics in 1912. Surfing came to Australia by 1915 with the first surf life saving competition being held that year. Les Darcy began his boxing career in 1915, with some of his later fights taking place at Sydney Stadium. The following year, an American promoter encouraged Darcy to go to the United States at a time when Australia was actively recruiting young men for the armed services. Controversy resulted and Darcy died at the age of 21 in the United States. When his body was returned to Australia, 100,000 people attended his Sydney funeral. Darcy would remain significant to Australians into the 2000s, when Kevin Rudd mentioned his story.

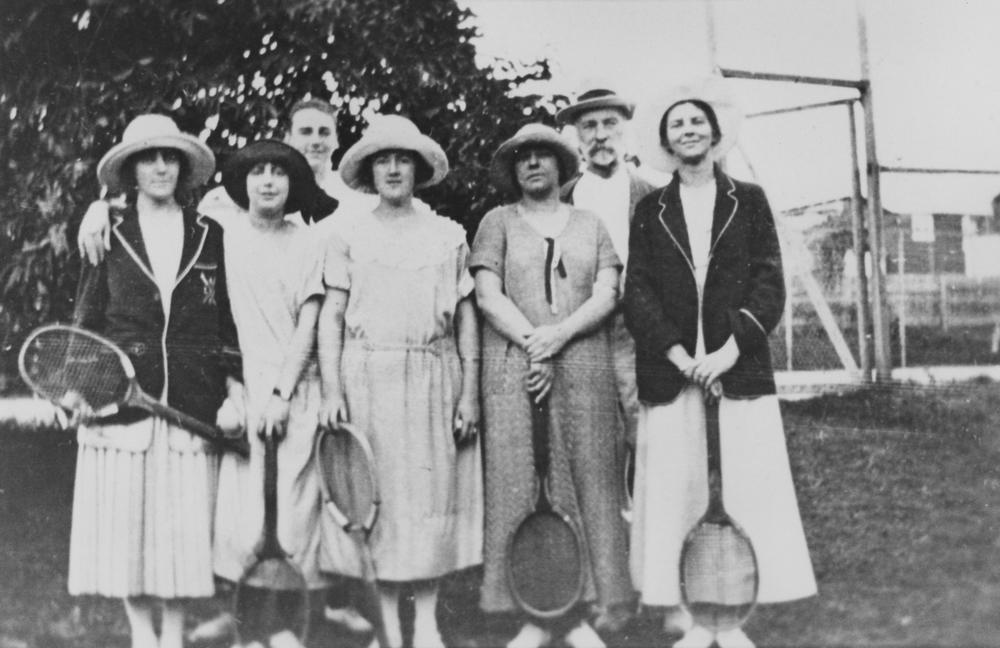
Group of tennis players, ca. 1922.

In 1922, a committee in Australia investigated the benefits of physical education for girls. They came up with several recommendations regarding what sports were and were not appropriate for girls to play based on the level of fitness required. It was determined that for some individual girls that for medical reasons, the girls should probably not be allowed to participate in tennis, netball, lacrosse, golf, hockey, and cricket. Football was completely medically inappropriate for girls to play. It was medically appropriate for all girls to be able to participate in, so long as they were not done in an overly competitive manner, swimming, rowing, cycling and horseback riding. Dick Eve won Australia's first Olympic diving gold medal in 1924. In 1924 the Australian Rugby League Board of Control, later to be known as the Australian Rugby League, was formed to administer the national team (the Kangaroos), and later as the national governing body for the sport of Rugby league. In 1928 the team also adopted the national colours of green and gold for the first time, having previously used blue and maroon, making the Kangaroos the third national sporting body to do so after cricket (from 1899) and the Australian Olympic team (from 1908). Netball Australia was founded in 1927 as the All Australia Women's Basket Ball Association.

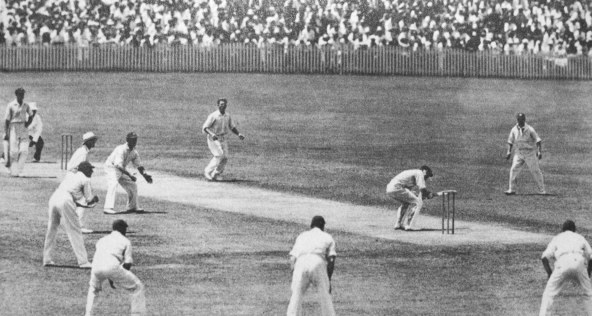
1932–33 Ashes: Bill Woodfull evades a bodyline ball at the Gabba

During the 1930s, the playing of sport on Sunday was banned in most of the country outside South Australia. The Bodyline cricket series between Australia and England took place in 1932–33. The English side were determined to win and employed physical intimidation against Australia to ensure victory. The bowling style used by the team known as body-line bowling was devised by Douglas Jardine with advice from Frank Foster in England ahead of the series in order to defeat Australian batsman Donald Bradman. Going into the start of the series, Bill Voce told the media "If we don't beat you, we'll knock your bloody heads off." The style of play was such that the Australians contemplated cancelling the series after the Adelaide test.

Following a successful Australian racing career, the race horse Phar Lap went to the United States where he died. There were many conspiracy theories at the time and later that suggested people in the United States poisoned the horse to prevent him from winning.

=== Contemporary era ===
Australian women's sports had an advantage over many other women's sport organisations around the world in the period after World War II. Women's sports organisations had largely remained intact and were holding competitions during the war period. This structure survived in the post war period. Women's sport were not hurt because of food rationing, petrol rationing, population disbursement, and other issues facing post-war Europe. In September 1949, Australian Canoeing was founded as the Australian Canoe Federation.

By the 1960s, Australia had an international identity as a sport-obsessed country, an identity which was embraced inside the country. This was so well known that in a 1962 edition of Sports Illustrated, Australia was named the most sports-obsessed country in the world. In 1967, Australia hosted the second World Netball Championships in Perth. That same year, South Australia became the last state to lift its ban on the playing of sports on Sunday.

Starting in the early 1970s, Australian sport underwent a paradigm shift with sponsorship becoming one of the fundamental drivers of earnings for Australian sport on amateur and professional levels. By the mid-1980s, the need for the ability to acquire sponsorship dollars in sport was so great that job applicants for sport administrator positions were expected to be able to demonstrate an ability to get it.

During the 1970s, Australia was being routinely defeated in major international competitions as Eastern Bloc countries enjoyed strong government support for sport. The Liberal governments at the time were opposed to similar intervention in Australia's sporting system as they felt it would be government intrusion into an important component of Australian life. In the 1974 elections, several Australian sporting competitors endorsed the Liberal party in advertisements that ran on television. Competitors involved included Ron Barassi, NSWRL player Johnny Raper and horse trainer Tommy Smith. That year, the Australian team qualified for the 1974 FIFA World Cup, the first successful qualification to the FIFA World Cup in the country's history after failing to qualify to the 1966 and 1970 tournaments. It would prove to be the only appearance for the Australian team for more than three decades.

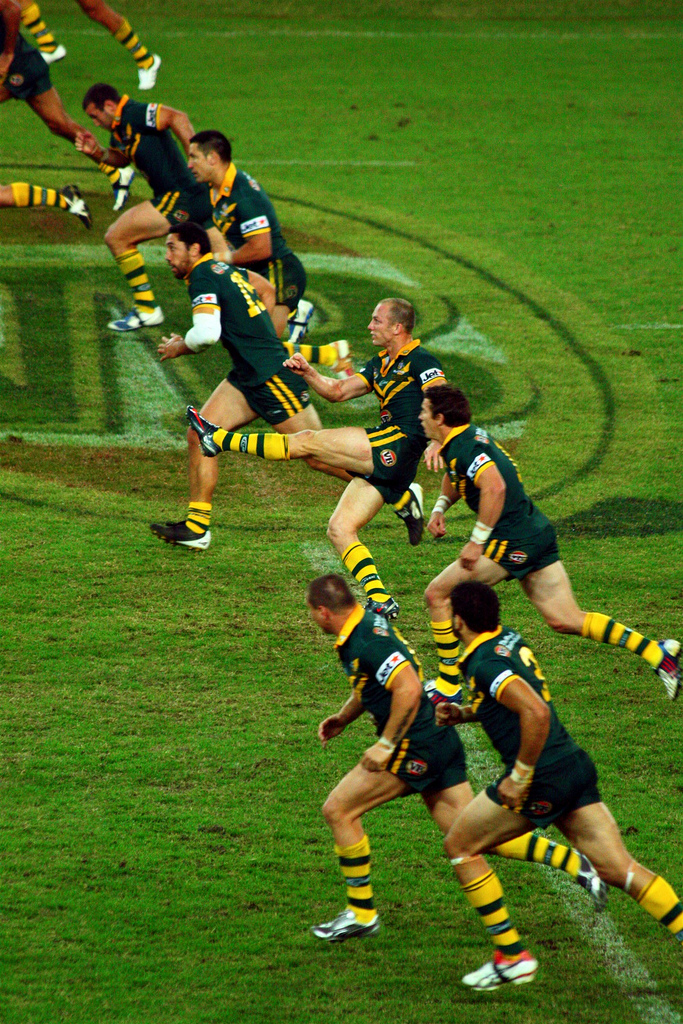
The Australia national rugby league team kicking off a match

The regional football code divide in Australia was still present in the 1980s, with rugby league football being the dominant code in Queensland, ACT and New South Wales while Australian rules football dominated in the rest of the country. When codes went outside of their traditional geographic home, they had little success in gaining new fans and participants. The Australian Institute of Sport was founded in 1981. In the lead up to and during the 1982 Commonwealth Games, the police were called upon to stop protests by Aboriginal land rights activists who staged protests timed with the event in order to politicise the event. Australia had competitors in the America's Cup yacht race for a number of years. Going into the 1983 race, the Australian media was not that interested in the race as they expected a similar result and in the media lead-up to the event, made it out to be a race for rich people. This lack of interest continued throughout the early races. Near the end, when Australia finally appeared poised to win it, millions of Australians turned on their television to watch the Australia II win the competition. That year, the Liberals used Australian tennis star John Newcombe and race car drivers Peter Brock and Alan Jones in their political advertising. Athletes would again be used, this time by the Labor Party, in the 1989 elections. During the 1980s, Australian soccer players began to start playing regularly in overseas professional leagues, with the most successful player of the decade being Craig Johnston who scored a goal in the 1986 FA Cup Final for Liverpool. During the 1980s, the federal government created a number of sport programs including Aussie Sports and Active Australia. The Australia women's national field hockey team began their run as one of the top teams in the world in 1985, a place they would hold until 2000.

In 1990, the Victorian Football League changed its name to the Australian Football League. During the 1990s, soccer in Australia faced a challenge in attracting youth players because of the ethnic nature of the sport at the highest levels of national competition. The sport's governing body made an effort to make the game less ethnically oriented. At the same time, rival football codes were intentionally trying to bring in ethnic participants in order to expand their youth playing base. Doping became a concern during the 1980s and more active steps were taken to combat it in Australia in the early 1990s. In 1990, the Australian Sports Drug Agency Act 1990 was passed and took control of doping test away from the Australian Sport Commission and put it into the hands of an independent doping control agency as of 17 February 1991.

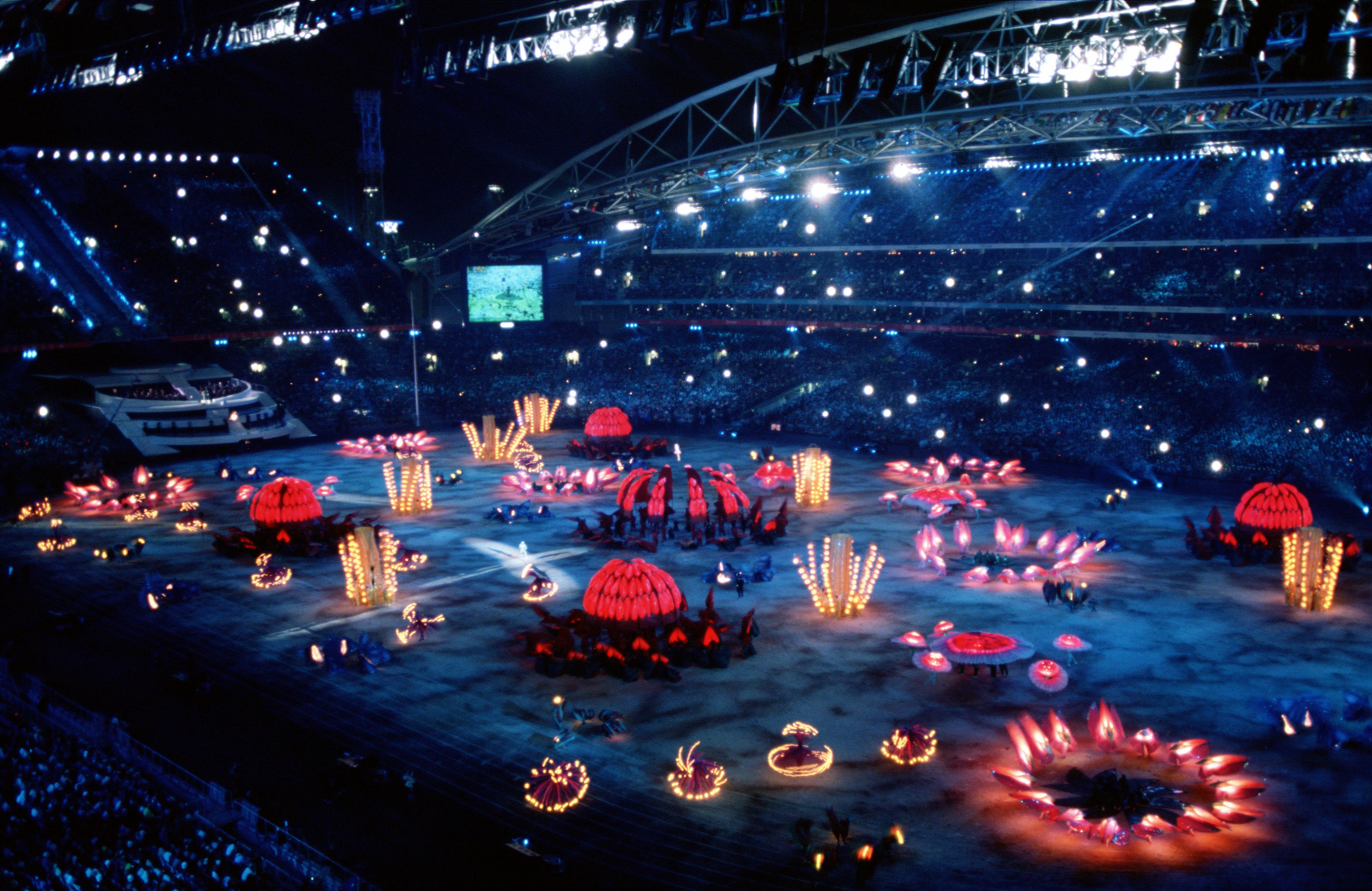
The 2000 Summer Olympics Opening Ceremony at Stadium Australia on 15 September 2000

In 2006, Melbourne hosted the 2006 Commonwealth Games. Later that year, the Australian team competed in the 2006 FIFA World Cup, their second FIFA World Cup appearance after 32 years of failing to qualify for the tournament.

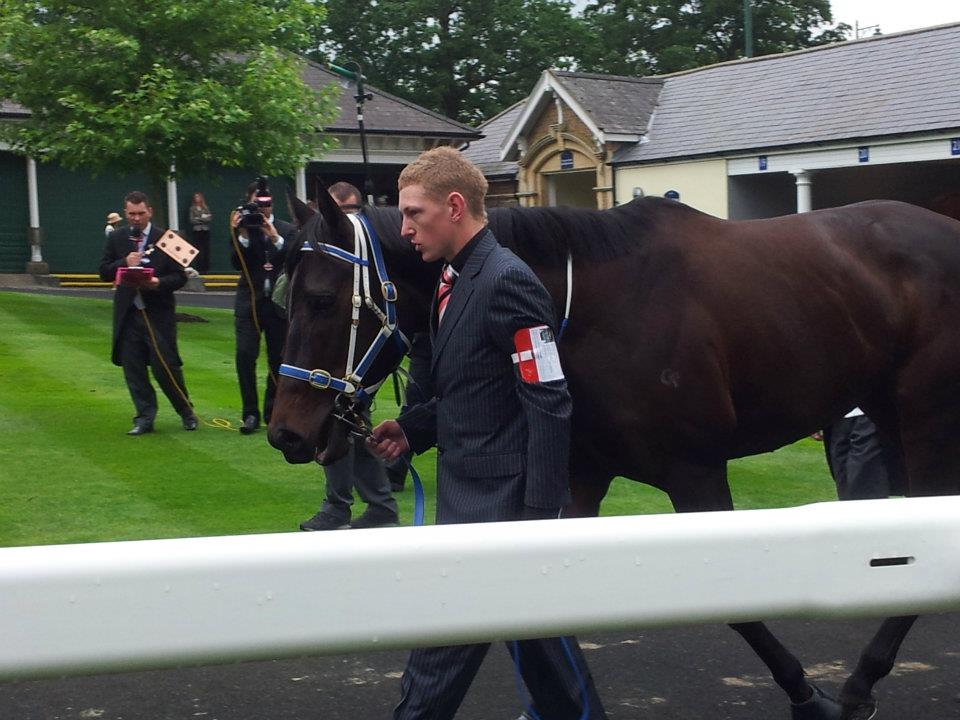
Black Caviar prior to the 2012 Diamond Jubilee Stakes at Royal Ascot

In 2012, the Australian Rugby League Commission was formed, bringing to an end the involvement of News Limited in the administration of Rugby League and the media companies' conflict of interests in the sport, finally concluding the fall-out from the Super League war in the 1990s. From 2008 until 2013, the Australian thoroughbred mare Black Caviar was undefeated for her entire 25-race career, a record not equaled in over 100 years. Notable wins include the 2012 Diamond Jubilee Stakes, as well as being named the top sprinter from 2010 to 2012 in the World Thoroughbred Racehorse Rankings and entering the Australian Racing Hall of Fame while still in training. Another thoroughbred mare, Winx, though not finishing unbeaten for her career, surpassed Black Caviar's record for consecutive wins by winning the last 33 races of her career, a streak running from May 2015 to April 2019. She also entered the Hall of Fame while in training, and set a world record for most Group 1 wins with 25. Among her wins were four consecutive Cox Plates.

== Organisation ==
The organisation of sport in Australia has been largely determined by its Federal system of government – Australian Government and six states and two territories governments and local governments.

State and Territory governments have a department with responsibility for sport and recreation. These departments provide assistance to state sports organisations, develop and manage sporting facilities, provide financial assistance for major sporting events and develop policies to assist sports across their state or territory. Each Australian State and Territory has established its own institute/academy of sport – ACT Academy of Sport (established 1989), New South Wales Institute of Sport (1996), Northern Territory Institute of Sport (1996), Queensland Academy of Sport (1991), South Australian Sports Institute (1982), Tasmanian Institute of Sport (1985), Victorian Institute of Sport (1990) and Western Australian Institute of Sport (1984).

There are 560 local councils across Australia. Local governments generally focus on the provision of facilities such as swimming pools, sporting fields, stadiums and tennis courts.

Government involvement in sport up until the 1970s was fairly limited with local governments playing a major role through the provision of sporting facilities. However, this changed over the next two decades with an Australian Bureau of Statistics survey in 2001–2002 finding that approximately $2 billion was spent on sport by three levels of government – 10 per cent from the Australian Government, 40 per cent from state and territory governments, and the remaining 50 per cent from local government. State, territory and local government spending was predominantly directed to facilities and their upkeep. In 1973, the Recreation Minister's Council was established to provide a forum for Australian Government and State and Territory Minister's responsible for sport and recreation to discuss matters of interest. With government's taking an increased involvement in sport, it became the Sport and Recreation Minister's Council. More recently is referred to as Meeting of Sport and Recreation Ministers. The Meeting is assisted by the Committee of Australian Sport and Recreation Officials (CASRO) previously called the Standing Committee on Sport and Recreation (SCORS). The Meeting works cooperatively on issues such as match fixing, sport participation and water safety. In 2011, Minister's signed the National Sport and Active Recreation Policy Framework. The framework "provides a mechanism for the achievement of national goals for sport and active recreation, sets out agreed roles and responsibilities of governments and their expectations of sport and active recreation partners." In 1993, National Elite Sports Council was established to provide a forum for communication, issues management and national program coordination across the high performance in Australia. It includes representatives from AIS, State Institute /Academies, Australian Olympic Committee, Australian Paralympic Committee, and the Australian Commonwealth Games Association. In 2011, National Institute System Intergovernmental Agreement provides "guidance on how the sector will operate, with a principal focus on the delivery of the high performance plans of national sporting organisations."

The Australian government provided small amounts of funding in the 1950s and 1960s through the support of the National Fitness Council and international sporting teams such as the Australian Olympic team. The Australian Government's serious involvement and investment into sport came with it establishing the Australian Institute of Sport (AIS) in 1981. AIS was set up to improve Australia's performances in international sport which had started to decline in the 1960s and 1970s culminating in Australia winning no gold medals at the 1976 Montreal Olympics. In 1985, the Australian Sports Commission (ASC) was established to improve the Australian Government's administration of sport in terms of funding, participation and elite sport. The 1989 Senate Inquiry into drugs in sport resulted in the establishment of the Australian Sport Drug Agency (now called Australian Sports Anti-Doping Authority (ASADA)) in 1990 to manage Australia's anti-doping program.

== Participation ==
Total employment in the sports and recreation sector (thousands of people) since 1984

The most popular sports in Australia by adult participation are: swimming, athletics, cycling, soccer, golf, tennis, basketball, surfing, netball and cricket.

The highest rates of participation for Australian sport and recreation are informal, non-organised sports with bike riding, skateboarding, rollerblading or riding a scooter topping the list of activities for children, with 66% of all boys bike riding and 55.9% of all boys skateboarding, rollerblading or riding a scooter in 2009 and 2010. Girls also participated in these activities at high rates with 54.4% of them doing bike riding and 42.4% skateboarding, rollerblading or riding a scooter. Other sports popular for Australian girls include dancing, which had 26.3% participation, swimming with 19.8% participation and netball at 17%. For boys, the other popular sports for participation included soccer with a rate of participation of 19.9%, swimming with a participation rate of 17.2%, Australian rules at 16%.

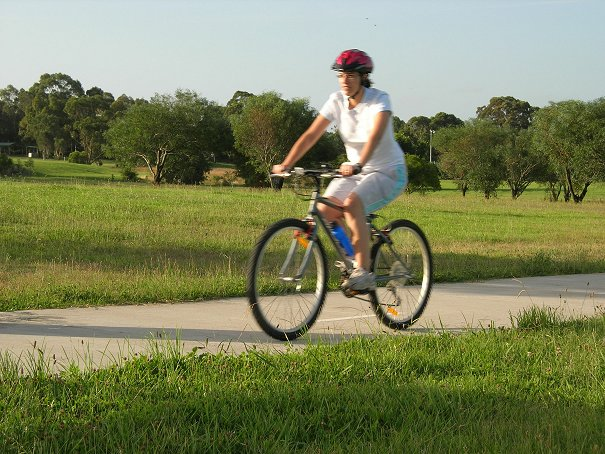
Bicycle riding is one of the most popular forms of physical recreation in Australia

Participation rates for adults in Australia were much lower than that of Australian children. For adult women in Australia, the number one sport activity they participate in is walking with 30% having done this in 2009 and 2010. The second most popular form of exercise and sport was Aerobics/fitness/gym with a rate of 16.7%. The third most popular for adult women was swimming and diving with 8.4%. For men, the most popular sport activity was also walking with a participation rate of 15.6%. This was followed by Aerobics/fitness/gym with 11.2%. The third most popular sport for adult males was cycling/BMXing with a participation rate of 8.2%.

There are 34,000 athletes, officials and coaches currently registered with the Athletics Australia. A 2007 estimate claimed that Australian football had 615,549 participants, Basketball has become one of the most popular participation sports in Australia. In Victoria, and Melbourne, particularly, it has more participants than any other sport. Australia's warm climate and long coastline of sandy beaches and rolling waves provide ideal conditions for water sports such as swimming. The majority of Australians live in cities or towns on or near the coast, and so beaches are a place that millions of Australians visit regularly.

According to the National Cricket Census, a record 1,650,030 people played Cricket across Australia in 2018–19. Women participation also reached record figures in growing to 496,484 players.

== Amateur sport ==
Amateur sport in Australia follows a corporate management system, with the national tier composed of national sport organisations that support and fund elite sport development. These organisations include the Australian Institute of Sport and the Australian Sports Commission. Below them is the state level, which includes state sporting organisations, state institute of sport and state departments of sport. The last level is district/regional associations and local clubs and community sports along with local government. At the national level, the national sport organisations govern most sports in Australia, with over 120 different national sports organisation overseeing sport in Australia. The role of government in this structure is important as government funding for most sport in Australia comes from the national government, state and territory governments, and local governments. In the late 1990s, government support for sport was double that of public non-financial corporations.

Amateur sport was transformed in Australia in the 1980s with the creation of the AIS Australian Institute of Sport. The institute, formally opened by Malcolm Fraser in 1981, was designed to make Australian amateur sport at major world competitions, like the Olympics, competitive with the rest of the world and increase the number of medals won by the country. A few years later, in 1984, the Australian Sports Commission was created to better address the distribution of funds to support sport. It had a budget of A$109 million in 2000. By 2009, the Australian Sports Commission had a budget of A$150 million, up from A$5 million when it first was created.

Amateur sport has been able to draw large audiences. In the 1950s, 120,000 fans would go to the MCG to watch major athletics events.

Australian amateur sport has dealt with financial problems. In the 2000s, Athletics Australia was facing duel problems of financial problems and failure for the sport to consistently medal at major international sporting events compared to other sports and their representative organisations like Swimming Australia and Rowing Australia.

== National Leagues ==
Major professional sports leagues in Australia are similar to major professional sports leagues in the United States and Canada in that they are closed leagues that do not practice promotion and relegation, unlike sports leagues in Europe and Latin America.

=== Male Major Leagues ===
League	Sport	Teams	Popularity by state	Established	Notes
Australian Football League	Australian rules football	18	Most popular winter sport in Victoria, South Australia, Western Australia, the Northern Territory and Tasmania.	1897	Most attended sport
A-League Men	Soccer	12	Moderately Popular nationwide	2004	
Big Bash League	Cricket	8	Most popular summer sport nationwide	2011 (Note: First league established 2005, current league established in 2011.)	
National Basketball League	Basketball	10	Moderately popular nationwide	1979	
Super Rugby	Rugby union	10	Most Popular winter sport in New South Wales, Queensland and the Australian Capital Territory.	1996	
National Rugby League	Rugby league	17	Most Popular winter sport in New South Wales, Queensland and the Australian Capital Territory.	1908	Most watched sport by TV

=== Female Major Leagues ===
League	Sport	Teams	Popularity by state	Established
Australian Football League Womens	Australian rules football	18	Most popular winter sport in Victoria, South Australia, Western Australia, the Northern Territory and Tasmania.	2017
A-League Womens	Soccer	12	Moderately Popular nationwide	2008
Womens Big Bash League	Cricket	8	Most popular summer sport nationwide	2015
Suncorp Super Netball	Netball	8	Popular nationwide	2017
Womens National Basketball League	Basketball	8	Popular nationwide	1981
National Rugby League Women's	Rugby league	12	Most Popular winter sport in New South Wales, Queensland and the Australian Capital Territory.	2018

=== Calendar of the major men's and women's professional sports leagues in Australia ===
January	February	March	April	May	June	July	August	September	October	November	December
		AFL (Australian football)									
		NRL (Rugby League)									
A-League Men (Soccer)									A-League Men (Soccer)		
BBL (Cricket)											BBL (Cricket)
NBL (Basketball)								NBL (Basketball)			
	Super Rugby (Rugby Union)										

January	February	March	April	May	June	July	August	September	October	November	December
								AFLW (Australian football)			
						NRLW (Rugby League)					
A-League Women (Soccer)									A-League Women (Soccer)		
									WBBL (Cricket)		
WNBL (Basketball)										WNBL (Basketball)	
		SSN (Netball)									

=== Other Significant National Leagues ===
League	Sport	Teams	Popularity by state	Established	Notes
Australian Baseball League	Baseball	4	Minor sport	2009	
Australian Ice Hockey League	Ice Hockey	8	Minor sport	2000	
Hockey One	Field hockey	7	Minor sport	2019	
Supercars Championship	Touring Car Racing	11	Popular nationwide	1960	
Super W	Rugby Union	5	Popular in New South Wales and Queensland	2018	

== Spectators ==
Australian sport fans have historically attended events in large numbers, dating back to the country's early history. An early football game played in Melbourne in 1858 had 2,000 spectators. By 1897, tens of thousands of spectators attended an early Australian rules football match at a time when top level soccer matches in England would draw six thousand fans. A finals match between the Carlton Football Club and Collingwood in 1938 drew 96,834 fans. In 1909, at a time when rugby union had not yet become professionalised, 52,000 people in Sydney attended a game between New South Wales and New Zealand. The spectators accounted for 10% of the total population of Sydney at the time. 60,922 fans attended the 1943 NSWRFL Grand Final between Norths and Newtown, and 78,056 attended the 1965 Grand Final between Souths and the then 9-time champion St George, although estimates including those who climbed onto roofs and over the perimeter fence put the actual crowd as high as 200,000. A world record was set for cricket attendance on 30 December 1932 when 63,993 fans watched England take on Australia at the Melbourne Cricket Ground. In 2010, the National Rugby League's premiership set its record for regular season attendance, with 3,490,778 attending across the season, at an average of 17,367 people at each match.

Total average game attendance for the Australian Football League and the National Rugby League increased between 1970 and 2000, with the AFL going from an average attendance of 24,344 people per match in 1970 to 27,325 by 1980 to 25,238 in 1990 and 34,094 by 2000. The National Rugby League had an average per game attendance of 11,990 in 1970, saw a decrease in 1980 to 10,860 but increased to 12,073 by 1990 and improved on that to 14,043 by 2000. Founded later, the National Basketball League had an average per game attendance of 1,158 in 1985, increased this to 4,551 by 1990, and kept attendance steady with 4,636 average fans per game in 2000.

In March 1999, 104,000 fans attended a double header match in the National Rugby League at Stadium Australia four days after the venue formally opened. In 2000, during the soccer gold medal match between Cameroon and Spain, 114,000 fans watched the game live inside Stadium Australia. In the 2006–07 season, the A-League Melbourne Victory averaged 27,728 people to their home matches throughout the season. The 2009–10 regular season was considerably lower.

In 2019, the Australian Football League achieved its highest total attendance for any season of 7,594,302, a record for the competition, at an average attendance of 36,687 for each match.

The Big Bash League (BBL) was established in 2011. The first season attracted an average of 18,021 spectators per match. In the 2014–15 season, the average attendance for each match was 23,590 with the Adelaide Strikers attracting a record average home crowd of 36,023 spectators each game. The 2015 Cricket World Cup final was played in front of 93,013 spectators, a record crowd for a day of cricket in Australia. BBL in its sixth season in 2016–17, drew an average crowd in excess of 30,000 for the first time in history, with overall count crossing 1 million for 35 matches.

In April 2024, the 2023–24 A-League Women season set the record for the most attended season of any women's sport in Australian history, with the season recording a total attendance of 284,551 at 15 April 2024, and finishing with a final total attendance of 312,199.

National League attendance of team sports – latest season (Bolded Competitions are Women's Leagues)
Competition	Sport	Total spectatorship	Average attendance	Year	Ref
Australian Football League	Australian football	8,139,464	36,396	2023	
**AFL Women's**	Australian football	283,922	2,868	2023	
Big Bash League	Cricket	1,212,696	21,505	2023-24	
**Women's Big Bash League**	Cricket	852,549	6,478	2022	
A-League Men	Soccer	1,309,087	7,982	2022–23	
**A-League Women**	Soccer	137,602	1,336	2022–23	
Australian Baseball League	Baseball	14,899	93	2022–23	
National Rugby League	Rugby league	4,265,289	20,605	2024	
**NRL Women's**	Rugby league	98,442	8,204	2022	
National Basketball League	Basketball	970,704	6,303	2022–23	
**Women's National Basketball League**	Basketball	24,630	3,079	2022–23	
**Super Netball League**	Netball	266,197	–	2023	

Other Major Competitions/Leagues/Games attendance (Bolded Competitions are Women's Competitions)
Competition	Sport	Total Spectatorship	Average Attendance	Year	Ref
AFLX	AFLX – Australian football	42,730	14,243	2018	
E. J. Whitten Legends Game	Australian football	8,000	8,000	2018	
JLT Community Series	Australian football	92,333	5,130	2018	
Boxing Day Test	Cricket (test cricket)	261,335 (88,173 Boxing Day)	52,267	2017	
State of Origin	Rugby league	192,255	64,085	2022	
**Women's State of Origin**	**Rugby league**	**11,321**	**11,321**	**2022**	
The Rugby Championship	Rugby union	433,657	36,138	2018	
Super Rugby	Rugby union	773,940	19,348	2012	
Formula One Grand Prix	Motorsport	419,114 (128,294 Race Day)	-	2022	

Total attendance by sport
Sport	Total spectatorship	Average attendance	Year	Ref
Australian football	8,139,464	36,396	2023	
Rugby league	3,604,108	16,609	2022	
Soccer	2,502,789	13,242	2015–16	
Cricket	1,756,131	24,734	2016–17	
Basketball	1,073,643	7,304	2019–20	
Rugby union	359,266	Not available	2022	

== Sports media ==
Media coverage of Australian sport and athletes predates 1876. The first all Australian sport publication, The Referee, was first published in 1886 in Sydney. Soccer World was a weekly newspaper from the 1960s through to the 1980s when it became a monthly magazine. The major newspapers for sport coverage in the country include the Sydney Morning Herald, The Courier Mail, the Herald Sun and The West Australian.

There is a long history of television coverage of sports in Australia. From 1957 to 2001, the Seven Network was the network for the Australian Football League. The only year that Seven was not the network for the league was in 1987 when the AFL was on the Australian Broadcasting Corporation (ABC). An exclusive deal was agreed upon by Seven in 1976 for a five-year deal worth A$3 million.

The media plays an important part in Australia's sporting landscape, with many sporting events televised or broadcast on radio. The government has anti-siphoning laws to protect free-to-air stations. Beyond televising live events, there are many sport-related television and radio programs, as well as several magazine publications dedicated to sport. Australian sport has also been the subject of Australian-made films such as The Club, Australian Rules, The Final Winter and Footy Legends

World Series Cricket was a break away professional cricket competition staged between 1977 and 1979 and organised by Kerry Packer for his TV network, Nine. The matches ran in opposition to international cricket. It drastically changed the nature of cricket and its influence continues to be felt today.

Not all sports have had favourable deals with networks. The first television offer for the National Basketball League was worth A$1 in an offered made by Seven that the league accepted. The deal made by Ten Network to the New South Wales Rugby League was worth considerably more, worth A$48 million for a five-year deal that also included broadcasting rights for the State of Origin and the Australia national rugby league team. This deal was terminated early because the network could not afford to pay out.

The 1967 NSWRFL season's grand final became the first football grand final of any code to be televised live in Australia. The Nine Network had paid $5,000 for the broadcasting rights.

SBS and FoxSports are two of the most important television networks in Australia in terms of covering all Australian sports, not just the popular professional leagues. Administrators for less popular spectator sports, such as basketball and netball, believe that getting additional television and newspaper coverage is fundamental for the growth and success of their sports going forward.

Anti-siphoning laws in Australia regulate the media companies' access to significant sporting events. In 1992, when the country experienced growth in paid-subscription media, the Parliament of Australia enacted the Broadcasting Services Act that gave free-to-air broadcasters preferential access to acquire broadcasting rights to sporting events. The anti-siphoning list is a list of major sporting events that the Parliament of Australia has decided must be available for all Australians to see free of charge and cannot be "siphoned off" to pay TV where people are forced to pay to see them. The current anti-siphoning list came into effect in 2006 and expires 31 December 2010. The Minister for Communications can add or remove events from the list at his discretion. There are currently ten sports on the anti-siphoning list plus the Olympic and Commonwealth Games. Events on the anti-siphoning list are delisted 12 weeks before they start to ensure pay TV broadcasters have reasonable access to listed events, if free-to-air broadcasters decide not to purchase the broadcast rights for a particular event. Any rights to listed sporting events that are not acquired by free-to-air broadcasters are available to pay TV. For multi-round events where it is simply not possible for free-to-air networks to broadcast all matches within the event (e.g. the Australian Open) complementary coverage is available on pay television. The Federal Government is obliged by legislation to conduct a review of the list before the end of 2009. The current anti-siphoning list requires showing listed sports on the broadcaster's main channel.

Rugby league, which includes NRL, State of Origin and national team matches, had the highest aggregate television ratings of any sport in 2022 (also 2009 and 2010.) Also, in a world first, the Nine Network broadcast free-to-air the first match of the 2010 State of Origin series live in 3D in New South Wales, Queensland and Victoria. It has consistently been a highly watched sports event in the country over the last decade in terms of television ratings and is currently the highest rating sport competition in Australia as at 2022.

Rugby union is currently aired on numerous Nine Entertainment platforms, including Channel 9, 9Gem, and Stan Sport, as part of a A$100 million deal starting in 2021. Super Rugby games are broadcast on 9Gem every Saturday, while all other games are available on Stan Sport. Within a year of the deal starting, the Super Rugby Final had increased its ratings by 13-fold to 1.3 million, with Wallabies International games also experiencing growth.

Cricket Australia announced an unprecedented $590 million deal with free-to-air television networks Nine and Ten in 2013 to broadcast the sport – a 118 per cent increase on the previous five-year contract.

BBL games are currently broadcast in Australia by Fox Sports and the free-to-air Seven Network. They were previously broadcast by Network Ten. In 2013 Ten paid $100 million for BBL rights over five years, marking the channel's first foray in elite cricket coverage.

Network Ten's BBL coverage has become a regular feature of Australian summers and in 2014-15 attracted an average audience of more than 943,000 people nationally in 2014–15 season, including a peak audience of 1.9 million viewers for the final between the Perth Scorchers and Sydney Sixers.

There are a number of Australian sport films. They include The Club. The film was based on a play produced in 1977, in Melbourne. It has been in the senior English syllabi for four Australian states for many years. The film was written by David Williamson, directed by Bruce Beresford and starring John Howard, Jack Thompson, Graham Kennedy and Frank Wilson. Another Australian sport film is The Final Winter, released in 2007. It was directed by Brian Andrews and Jane Forrest and produced by Anthony Coffee, and Michelle Russell, while independently produced it is being distributed by Paramount Pictures. It was written by Matt Nable who also starred as the lead role 'Grub' Henderson. The film, which earned praise from critics, focuses around Grub who is the captain of the Newtown Jets football team in the early 1980s and his determination to stand for what rugby league traditionally stood for while dealing with his own identity crisis. Other Australian sport films include Australian Rules and Footy Legends.

Sport is popular on the radio. This Sporting Life was a culturally iconic Triple J radio comedy program created by actor-writer comedians John Doyle and Greig Pickhaver, who performed as their characters Roy and HG. Broadcast from 1986 to 2008, it was one of the longest-running, most popular and most successful radio comedy programs of the post-television era in Australia. It was the longest-running show in Triple J's programming history and commanded a large and dedicated nationwide audience throughout its 22-year run. 2KY is a commercial radio station based in Sydney, broadcasting throughout New South Wales and Canberra on a network of over 140 narrowcast transmitters as well as the main 1017 AM frequency in Sydney. 2KY broadcasts live commentary of thoroughbred, harness and greyhound racing. Over 1500 races are covered each week, including the pre and post race form and TAB betting information.

There are a number of Australian sport magazines. One is the AFL Record. The magazine is published in a sports magazine style format. Eight different versions, one for each game, are published for each weekly round, 60,000 copies in total, and Roy Morgan Research estimates that the Record has a weekly readership of over 200,000. As of 2009, the week's records are published and are able to be viewed in an online magazine format. Another Australian sporting magazine is Australia's Surfing Life, a monthly magazine about surfing published in Australia. It features articles about surf trips in Australia and overseas, surfing technique, board design and wetsuits. The magazine was founded in 1985.

== International competitions ==
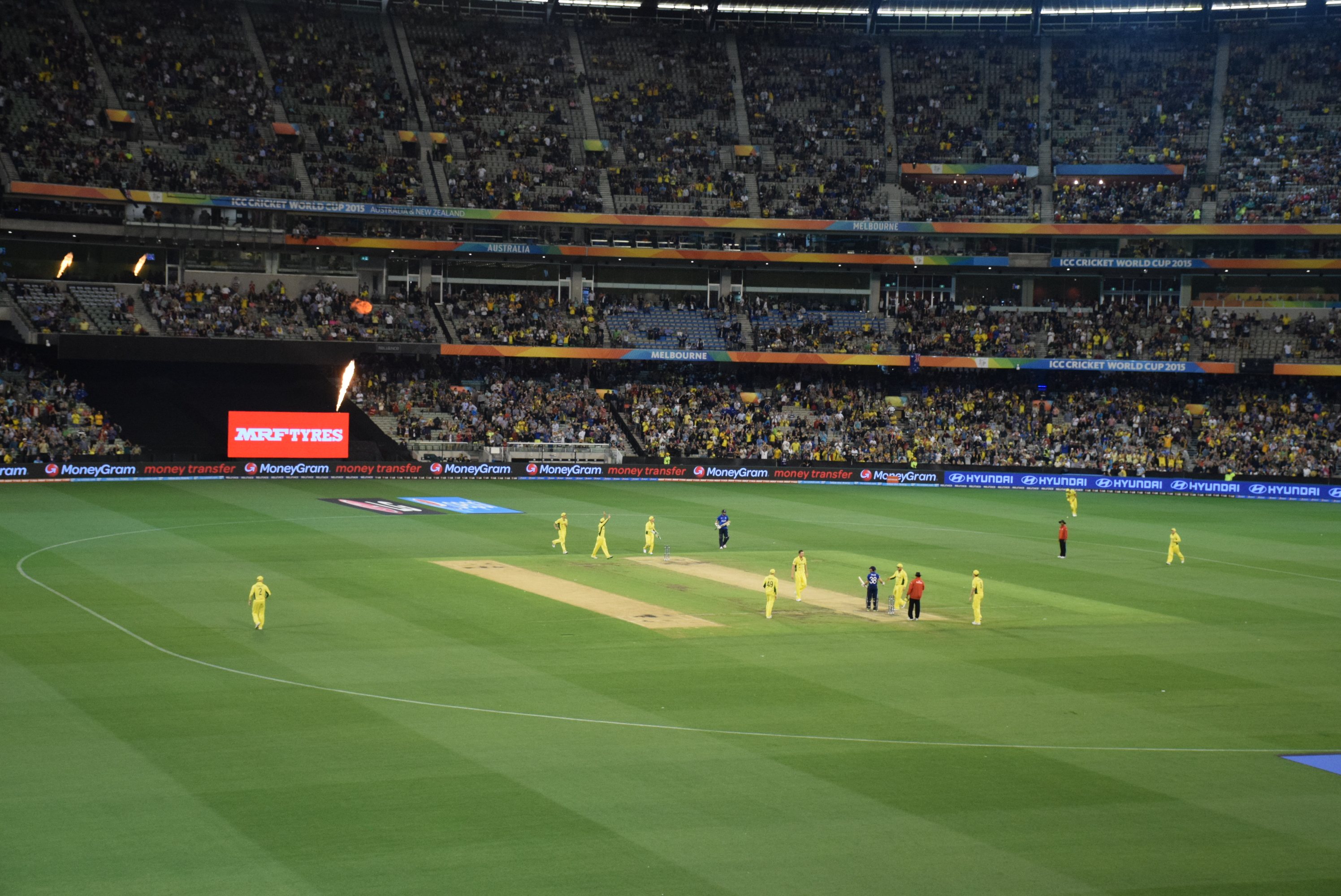
The Australia national cricket team competing against England during the 2015 Cricket World Cup.

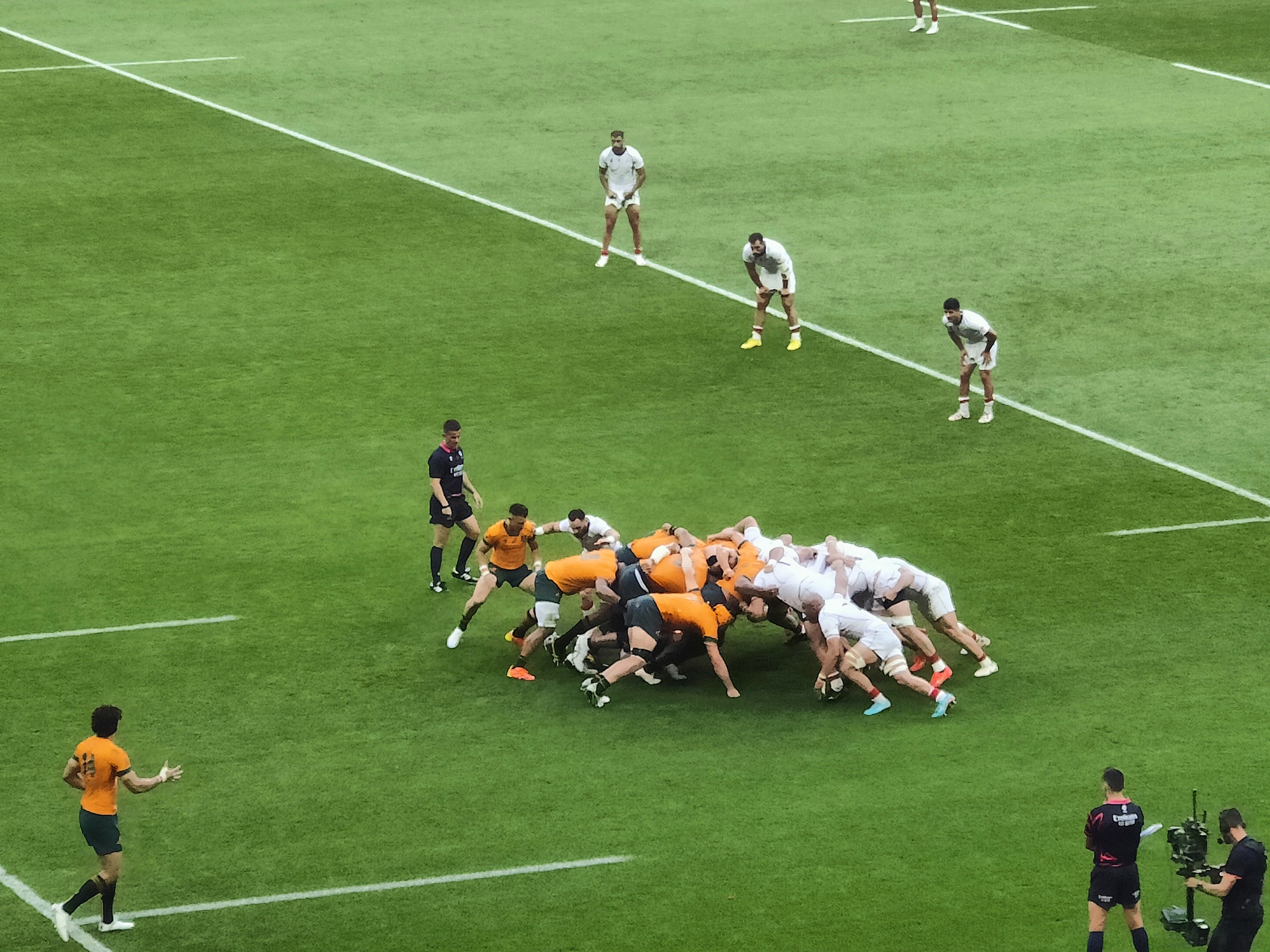
The Australia national rugby union team facing against Georgia at the 2023 Rugby World Cup.

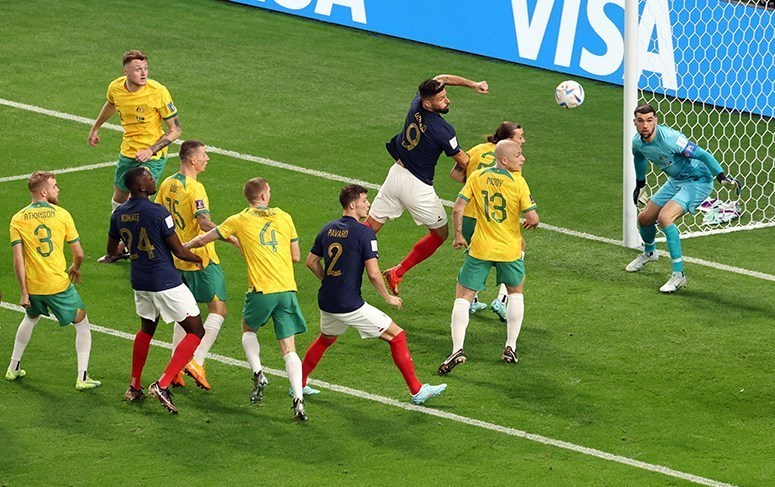
The Australia national soccer team playing against France during the 2022 FIFA World Cup.

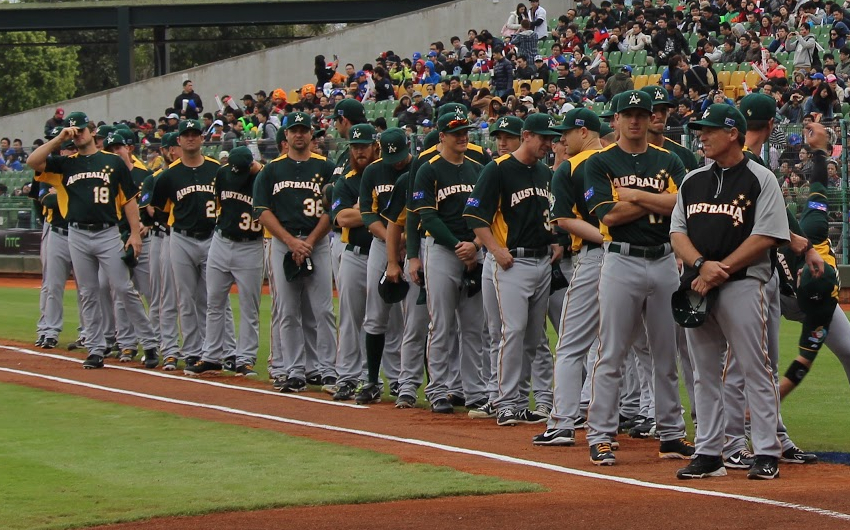
The Australia national baseball team during the 2013 World Baseball Classic.

Australian representative teams participate in many international competitions, such as the Olympics, Commonwealth Games, Cricket World Cup, Rugby World Cup, Rugby League World Cup, FIFA World Cup, the Basketball World Cup for both men's and women's, Netball World Cup, World Baseball Classic and the Hockey World Cup.

The Australia national cricket team have participated in every edition of the Cricket World Cup. Australia have been the most successful in the event, winning the tournament six times out of thirteen editions held.

The Australia national rugby league team have also participated in every edition of the Rugby League World Cup. Australia have been very successful in the event, winning the tournament a record 12 times.

The Australia national rugby union team have participated in every Rugby World Cup. Australia have been very successful in the tournament, winning it two times despite it not being the most popular sport in Australia.

Australia's women have repeatedly won at the highest level. The Australia national netball team have won the Netball World Cup a record 11 times. The Australian women's national cricket team have won the Women's Cricket World Cup a record five times. The Australian women's national field hockey team have won the gold medal at the Olympics and the Women's Hockey World Cup three and two times respectively.

The Australia women's national basketball team, known as the Opals, regularly compete well against the world elite at the FIBA Women's Basketball World Cup, having won the event in 2006, finished second in 2018 and finished third three times, and at the Summer Olympics Basketball Tournament, where they have won silver medals three times and bronze medals twice.

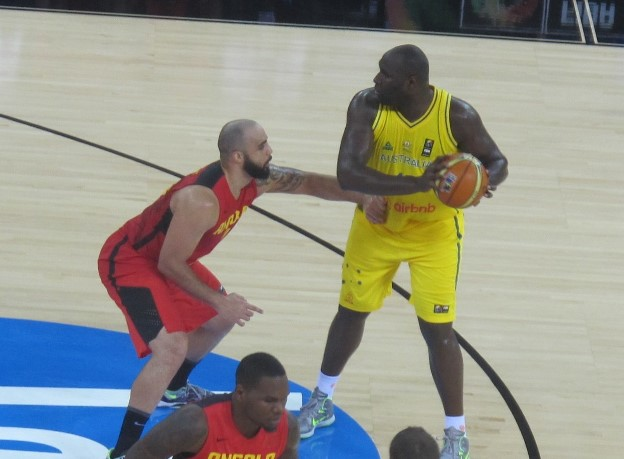
Nathan Jawai (right) represented Australia at the 2014 Basketball World Cup

The Australia national soccer team, nicknamed the Socceroos, have appeared at the FIFA World Cup in 1974, 2006, 2010, 2014, 2018, 2022, and 2026. At the 2006 World Cup, the Socceroos surprised many by reaching the Round of 16, losing 1–0 in injury time to the eventual champions, Italy. At the 2022 World Cup, an unfancied Socceroos team again advanced to the knockout stage after winning 2 of 3 group stage matches, including a 1–0 upset victory against Denmark. In the round of 16 they were defeated 1–2 by eventual champions Argentina. They also hold the unusual distinction of having won continental soccer championships of two confederations – Oceania's OFC Nations Cup four times between 1980 and 2004 and, after moving to the Asian Football Confederation in 2005, the AFC Asian Cup in 2015. The Australia women's national soccer team, the Matildas, have appeared in all FIFA Women's World Cups except the first in 1991. They have advanced past the group stage in each of the last four editions of the competition (2007, 2011, 2015 and 2019), losing in the quarter-finals in the first three of these editions and the round of 16 in 2019. In 2015, they became the first senior Australian national team of either sex to win a World Cup knockout stage match, specifically in the round of 16, newly instituted for the Women's World Cup in that year. The Matildas have also enjoyed success at the AFC Women's Asian Cup, advancing at least to the semi-finals in all five competitions since joining the AFC in 2006 and winning in 2010. Australia co-hosted the 2023 FIFA Women's World Cup alongside New Zealand, finishing with a best-ever fourth-place result. Their run in the tournament attracted widespread community support, dubbed by the media as "Matildas fever".

Australia are the most successful side at the Underwater Hockey World Championships, winning 25 titles including 11 men's elite championships and 8 women's elite championships. Australia has also hosted the 2003 Rugby World Cup, with the event generating around A$1 billion in economic activity while bringing in 2 million visitors to the country.

Australia has also hosted a number of major international sporting events, including the 1956 Summer Olympics and the 2000 Summer Olympics. The country also regularly hosts a major tennis Grand Slam event, the Australian Open, an FIA Formula One World Championship round (Australian Grand Prix), motorcycle MotoGP round (Australian motorcycle Grand Prix), as well as rounds of the Superbike World Championship, World Rally Championship alongside major domestically created, internationally recognised events including the Melbourne Cup and the Sydney to Hobart Yacht Race. Australia has hosted the 1992 Cricket World Cup and the 2015 Cricket World Cup along with New Zealand. The 2015 Cricket World Cup generated more than A$1.1 billion in direct spending, created the equivalent of 8,320 full-time jobs, and had a total of 2 million bed nights across the two host countries. Australia is the most successful team in the ICC Men's Cricket World Cup, finishing as champions 6 times in 1987, 1999, 2003, 2007, 2015 and 2023. It has also won the ICC Men's T20 World Cup once in 2021.

The 1868 Aboriginal cricket tour of England was the first tour by any sports team from Australia.

=== Olympics ===
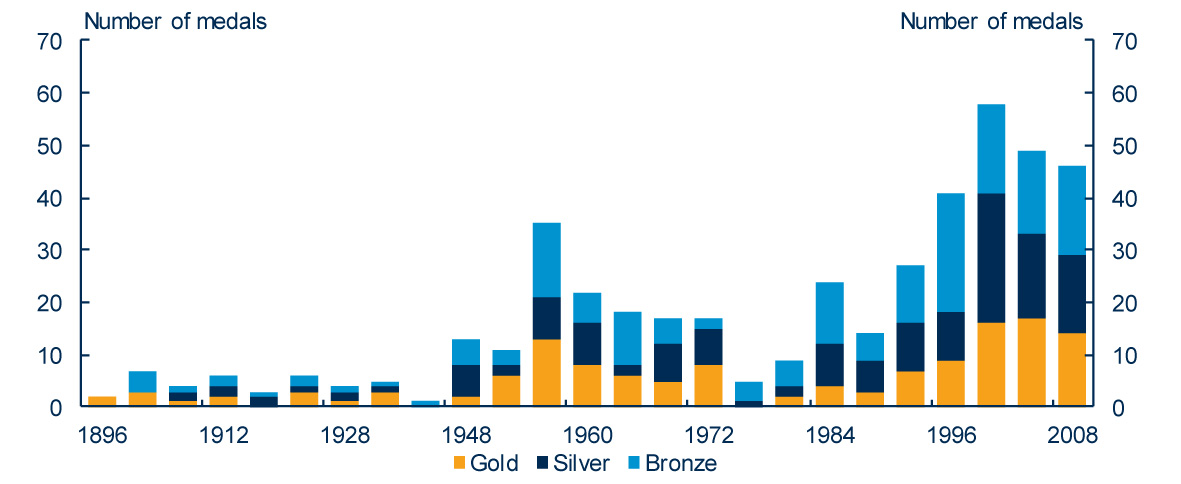
Australia's Olympic medal totals

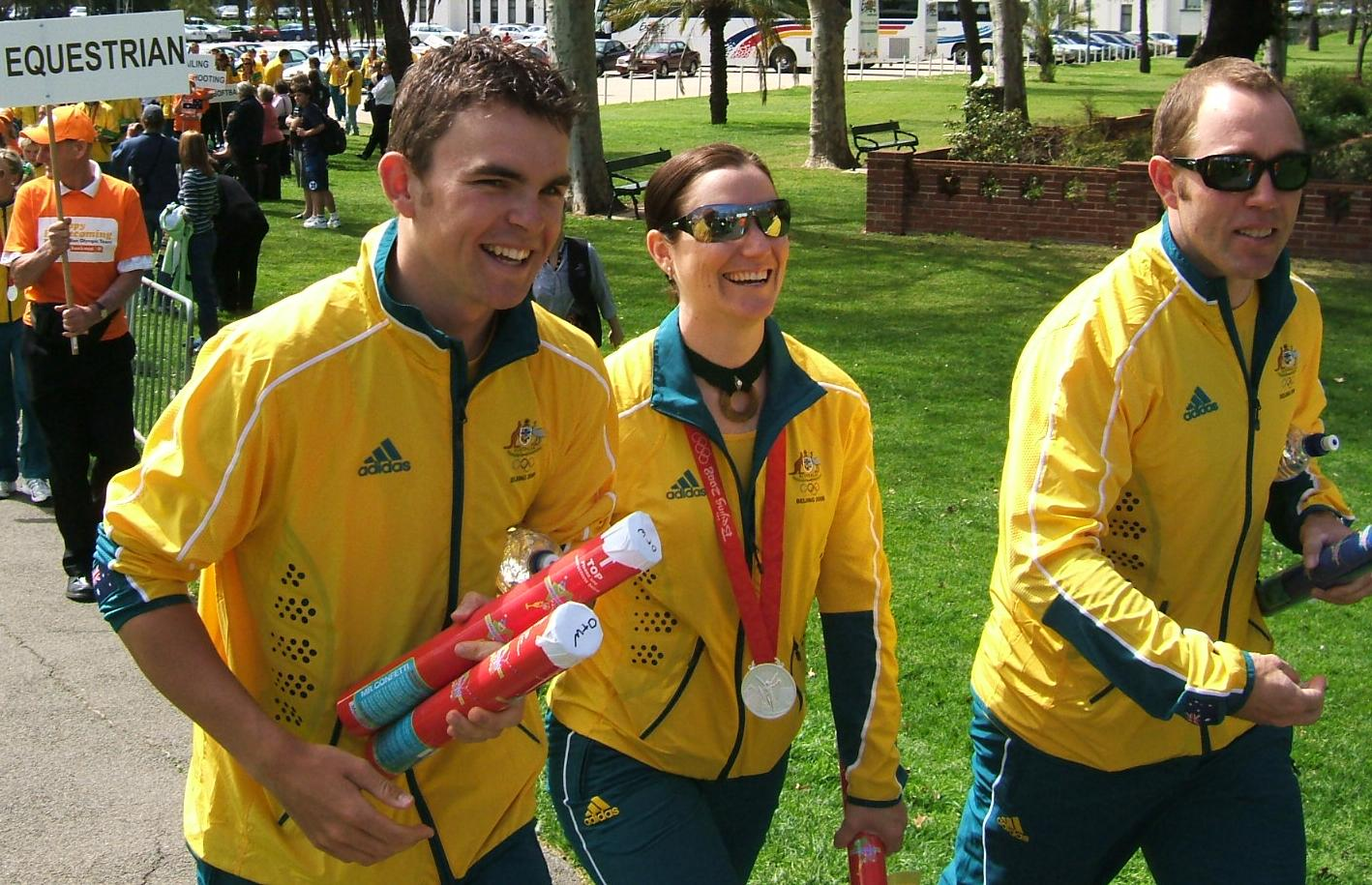
Australian track cyclists Jack Bobridge, Anna Meares and Shane Kelly.

The Olympic movement in Australia started out during the 1900s and 1910s. The first organisations for the Olympics in Australia came out of the athletics governance system and resulted in the creation of state based Olympic committees. The first national governing body for Australian Olympics was created in 1914 and was a joint effort with New Zealand though New Zealand was a less than able partner. The movement in Australia then stagnated as a result of the Great War. The New Zealand and Australian organisation was disbanded and an Australian only national organisation was founded in 1920 called the Australian Olympic Federation. The early goals of the organisation were to ratify team selection and to fundraise to assist Olympians in paying for their travel to compete at the Games. By the 1980s, the organisation had issues on the international level as the IOC wanted them to re-structure; until this time, the organisation followed governance models similar to that of other Australian sporting organisations with a federated model of governance. Changes were made the organisation ended up with an executive board with a president, two vice presidents, a secretary general and a 14-member executive board which had 10 elected members, 4 IOC members and 2 members of the Athlete's Commission.

Australia has hosted the Olympics twice, in 1956 in Melbourne and in 2000 in Sydney. These were the first Games hosted in the southern hemisphere. Brisbane will host the 2032 Summer Games.

Australia has been influential in the Olympic movement, with four Australian representatives who are members of the International Olympic Committee.

The government has provided monetary support for the Olympics. In the lead up to the 1924 Games, they provided 3,000 pounds and in 1936 provided 2,000 pounds. This support was seen as a way of supporting national identity, but no formal system existed for the funding wider sport at the time.

The 1956 Games were the first time Australia had an Equestrian competitor when Victorian Ernie Barker competed. Australia has generally been a world power in Olympic swimming since the 1956 Melbourne Olympics: swimmers like Shane Gould, Dawn Fraser, Ian Thorpe, Kieren Perkins and Ariarne Titmus have taken multiple gold medals.

Australia performed relatively poorly at the 1976 Summer Olympics. This upset the nation as it challenged a fundamental part of Australian identity. The following Olympics, the 1980 Summer Olympics, some Australian sports sat out as part of a boycott and the country earned only nine medals, two of them gold, in Moscow. To prevent a recurrence of this, the Australian Institute of Sport was created to help improve Australia's medal tally at the Games.

Channel Seven had exclusive Australian free-to-air, pay television, online and mobile telephone broadcast rights to the 2008 Summer Olympics in Beijing. The live telecast of the 2008 Summer Olympics was shared by the Seven Network and SBS Television. Seven broadcast the opening and closing ceremonies and mainstream sports, including swimming, athletics, rowing, cycling, and gymnastics. In contrast, SBS TV provided complementary coverage focused on long-form events such as soccer, road cycling, volleyball, and table tennis.

=== Paralympics ===
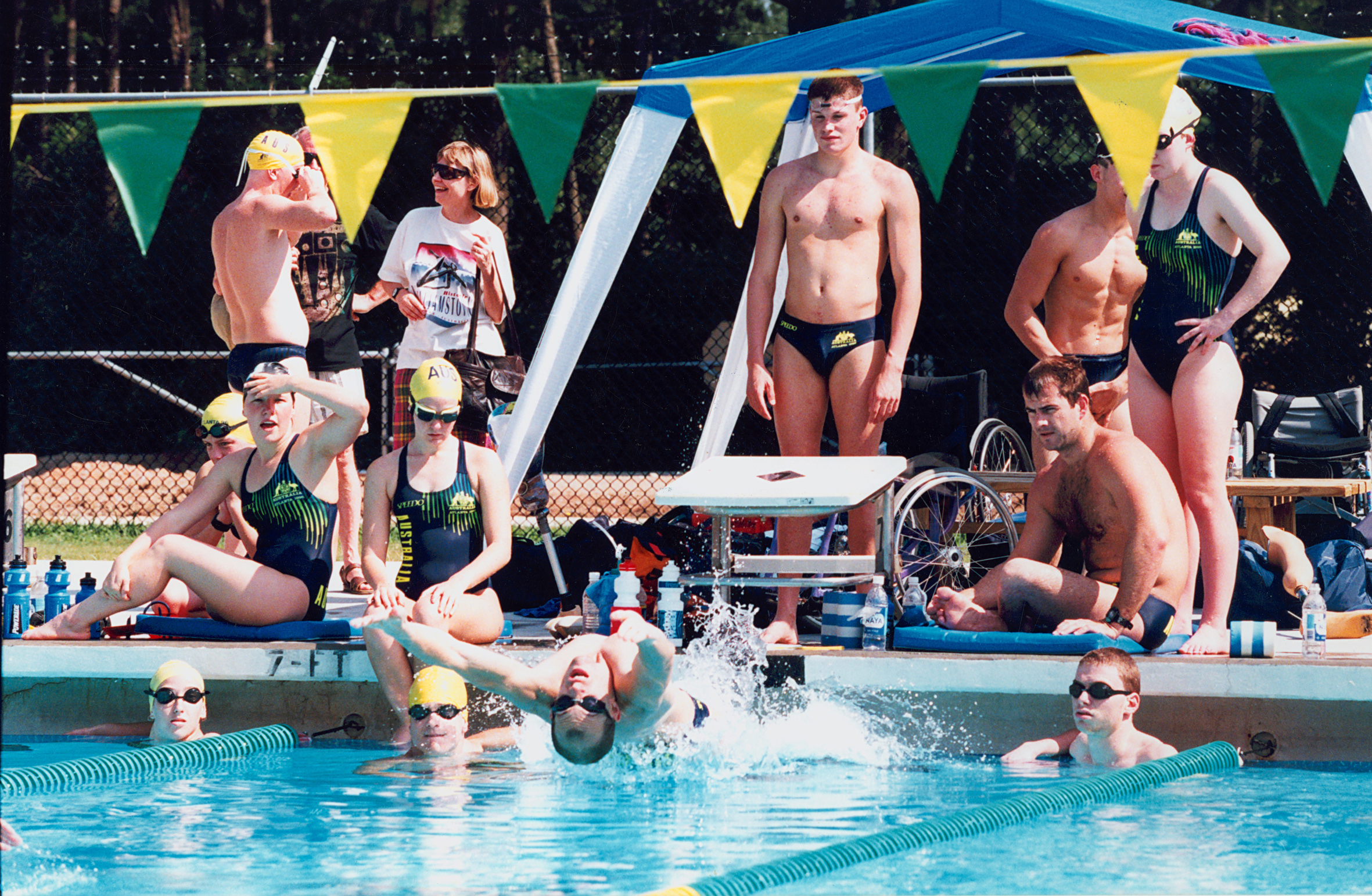
Australian swimmers at the training pool at the 1996 Atlanta Paralympic Games

Australia has attended every Summer Paralympics and hosted the 2000 Sydney Games. Australia sent a delegation of 170 athletes to compete at the 2008 Summer Paralympics in Beijing, and a team of 11 competitors to compete in two disciplines at the 2010 Winter Paralympics in Vancouver, British Columbia, Canada. A team of 161 members was sent to the 2012 Summer Paralympics in London.

=== Commonwealth Games ===
Australians take the Commonwealth Games seriously because, on one level of national thinking, the event offers the country an opportunity to prove they are superior to the "original country", the United Kingdom. By the 1938 British Empire Games, Australia's combined medal total was already greater than that of the Home Nations tallies combined. Australia would go on to beat England in total medals at the Commonwealth Games in 1950, 1962, 1970, 1974 and 1982. This rivalry with England continued to be an important component of the games up until the mid 2010s. Since then the importance of the Commonwealth Games has declined in the minds of the Australian public, due to the decreasing relevance of the Commonwealth in Australia as well as the perceived lack of competition. The Olympics Games has now become the primary way for Australians to measure themselves against the world.

=== Pan Pacific Masters Games ===
14th Pan Pacific Masters Games in Queensland, Australia on 6 – 15 November 2026.

Editions:

1. 1998 Pan Pacific Masters Games
2. 2000 Pan Pacific Masters Games
3. 2002 Pan Pacific Masters Games
4. 2004 Pan Pacific Masters Games
5. 2006 Pan Pacific Masters Games
6. 2008 Pan Pacific Masters Games
7. 2010 Pan Pacific Masters Games
8. 2012 Pan Pacific Masters Games
9. 2014 Pan Pacific Masters Games
10. 2016 Pan Pacific Masters Games
11. 2018 Pan Pacific Masters Games
12. 2022 Pan Pacific Masters Games
13. 2024 Pan Pacific Masters Games - Queensland, Australia - 1 – 10 November 2024
14. 2026 Pan Pacific Masters Games - Queensland, Australia - 6 – 15 November 2026 - Over 40 Sports – Over 16,000 Athletes
- 2020 Pan Pacific Masters Games was cancelled.

== Events ==
January

- United Cup
- Brisbane International
- Adelaide International
- Hobart International
- Australian Open

February – August

- Super Rugby Season

March – August

- Super Netball Season

March – September

- NRL Season
- AFL Season

March – November

- Supercars Championship

June

- A-League Grand Final

June – July

- State of Origin series (rugby league)

July – October

- NRL Women's Season

August – November

- AFL Women's Season

September

- AFL Grand Final

September – February

- One-Day Cup

September – March

- Sheffield Shield
- Women's National Cricket League

October

- NRL Grand Final

October – November

- WBBL Season

October – January

- WNBL Season

October – March

- NBL Season

October – April

- A-League Men Season

November

- Australian Open, Golf

November – February

- ABL Season

December – January

- BBL Season

== Politics and Sport ==
=== Endorsements ===
AFL Club	Same-sex marriage	Voice to parliament"
Brisbane Lions	check	check
Collingwood Football Club	check	check
Essendon Football Club	check	check
Geelong Football Club	check	check
Gold Coast Football Club	check	check
Greater Western Sydney Giants	check	check
North Melbourne Football Club	check	check
St Kilda Football Club	check	check
Sydney Swans	check	check
Western Bulldogs	check	check
Adelaide Football Club	Neutral	check
Carlton Football Club	Neutral	check
Fremantle Football Club	Neutral	check
Hawthorn Football Club	Neutral	check
Melbourne Football Club	Neutral	check
Port Adelaide Football Club	Neutral	check
Richmond Football Club	Neutral	check
West Coast Eagles	Neutral	check

== See also ==
- Concussions in Australian sport
- Australian Youth Olympic Festival
- Arafura Games
- Australian Masters Games
- Pan Pacific Masters Games
- Indigenous Nationals

=== By demographic ===
- Women's sport in Australia
- Sport in rural and regional Australia
- Disabled sport in Australia

=== By social and cultural context ===
- Australian national sports team nicknames
- Aussie Aussie Aussie, Oi Oi Oi
- Indigenous Australians#Recreation and sport
- List of sports museums and halls of fame in Australia
- List of international sports events in Australia
- List of Australian sports controversies
- List of Australian sports songs
- List of Australian sports films

=== By sport ===
- 1916 Pioneer Exhibition Game
- Athletics in Australia
- Baseball in Australia
- Basketball in Australia
- Castelling in Australia
- Cricket in Australia
- Hockey in Australia
- List of Australian equestrians
- Golf in Australia
- Motorsport in Australia
- Pickleball in Australia
- Rugby league in Australia
- Rugby union in Australia
- Soccer in Australia
- Surfing in Australia
- Tennis in Australia
- Winter sport in Australia
