= List of sports museums and halls of fame in Australia =

Australia has a rich sporting history. Sports museums and halls of fame have been established to recognize and promote the achievements of Australian athletes and sporting teams. This list is restricted to sports museums with a national focus and halls of fame with a national and state focus. Many Australian state sports organisations have established halls of fame but these are not listed.

== Sports museums and halls of fame ==
Name	Location	Sport	Type	Notes
Australian Sports Museum	Melbourne	All sports	Museum	Located at the Melbourne Cricket Ground and managed by Melbourne Cricket Club. Previously known as the National Sports Museum, and the Australian Gallery of Sport and Olympic Museum.
Sport Australia Hall of Fame	Melbourne	All sports	Hall of Fame	Located at the National Sports Museum
Sydney Cricket Ground Museum	Sydney	All sports	Museum	Sports played at Sydney Cricket Ground
NSW Hall of Champions	Sydney	All sports	Hall of Fame	Located at Sydney Olympic Park Sports Centre
Queensland Sport Hall of Fame	Queensland	All sports	Hall of Fame	Managed by QSport
Stadium Australia Hall of Fame	All sports	Sydney	Hall of Fame	Located at Stadium Australia in Sydney. Managed by Venues NSW.
South Australian Sport Hall of Fame	South Australia	All sports	Hall of Fame	Located at Adelaide Oval; managed by the Sport SA
Tasmanian Sporting Hall of Fame	Tasmania	All sports	Hall of Fame	Managed by Sport and Recreation Tasmania
ACT Sport Hall of Fame	Australian Capital Territory	All sports	Hall of Fame	Managed by ACTSPORT.
Western Australian Hall of Champions	Western Australia	All sports	Hall of Fame	Managed by Western Australian Institute of Sport
Aboriginal and Islander Sports Hall of Fame	National	All sports -,Indigenous	Hall of Fame	
Athletics Australia Hall of Fame	National	Athletics	Hall of Fame	Managed by Athletics Australia
Stawell Gift Hall of Fame	Stawell, Victoria	Athletics	Museum	
Australian Football Hall of Fame	National	Australian football	Hall of Fame	Located at the National Sports Museum. Managed by the Australian Football League
Baseball Australia Hall of Fame	National	Baseball	Hall of Fame	Managed by Baseball Australia
Basketball Australia Hall of Fame	National	Basketball	Hall of Fame	Managed by Basketball Australia
Bowls Australia Hall of Fame	National	Bowls	Hall of Fame	Managed by Bowls Australia
Australian National Boxing Hall of Fame	National	Boxing	Hall of Fame	
Paddle Australia Hall of Fame	National	Canoeing	Hall of Fame	Managed by Australian Canoeing
Australian Cricket Hall of Fame	Melbourne	Cricket	Hall of Fame	Located at the National Sports Museum. Managed by Cricket Australia
Bradman Museum and International Cricket Hall of Fame	Bowral, New South Wales	Cricket	Museum	Incorporates the International Cricket Hall of Fame.
Bradman Collection	Adelaide	Cricket	Museum	LOcated at Adelaide Oval the museum includes footage of Don Bradman, and his personal items including cricket bats, balls, trophies and of clothing. South Australian Cricket Association is now the custodian of the collection in conjunction with the Premier's Department, State Library and the Bradman Family. The State Library retains Bradman archival materials.
Bellerive Oval Museum	Hobart	Cricket	Museum	Located at Bellerive Oval, also known as Blundstone Arena.
WACA Museum	Perth, Western Australia	Cricket	Museum	Located at WACA Ground
Harrow Discovery Centre & Johnny Mullagh Interpretive Centre	Harrow, Victoria	Cricket	Museum	Museums honours Johnny ‘Unaarrimin’ Mullagh and the Australian Aboriginal cricket team's tour to England in 1868
Cycling Australia Hall of Fame	National	Cycling	Hall of Fame	Managed by Cycling Australia
The Oppy Museum	Rochester, Victoria	Cycling	Museum	Museum honours cycling champion Sir Hubert Opperman is located in the Campaspe Shire Service Centre in Rochester, Victoria
Darts Federation of Australia Hall of Fame	National	Darts	Hall of Fame	Managed by Darts Federation of Australia
Australian Diving Hall of Fame	National	Diving	Hall of Fame	Managed by Diving Australia
Equestrian Australia Hall of Fame	National	Equestrian	Hall of Fame	Managed by Equestrian Federation of Australia
Football Federation Australia Hall of Fame	National	Football	Hall of Fame	Managed by Football Federation Australia
Australasian Golf Museum	Bothwell, Tasmania	Golf	Museum	
Gymnastics Australia Hall of Fame	National	Gymnastics	Hall of Fame	Managed by Gymnastics Australia
Hockey Australia Hall of Fame	National	Hockey	Hall of Fame	Managed by Hockey Australia
Australian Lacrosse Hall of Fame	National	Lacrosse	Hall of Fame	Managed by Lacrosse Australia
Australian Racing Museum and Hall of Fame	Melbourne	Horse racing	Museum	Exhibitions at National Sports Museum
National Motor Racing Museum	Bathurst, New South Wales	Motor sport	Museum	
Australian Motor Sport Hall of Fame	National	Motor sport	Hall of Fame	Initiative of the Confederation of Australian Motor Sport (CAMS), strongly supported by Motorcycling Australia (MA), Karting Australia, the Australian National Drag Racing Association (ANDRA), Speedway Australia, the Australian Grand Prix Corporation and V8 Supercars.
Australian Speedway Hall Of Fame	National	Motor sport	Hall of Fame	
CAMS Rallying Hall of Fame	National	Motor sport	Hall of Fame	Managed by Confederation of Australian Motor Sport
Australian Netball Hall of Fame	National	Netball	Hall of Fame	Managed by Netball Australia
Australian Paralympic Hall of Fame |National	Paralympic Games	Hall of Fame	Managed by the Australian Paralympic Committee	
Rugby League Museum	Sydney	Rugby league	Museum	Located at Rugby League Central, Moore Park, Sydney. Managed by the National Rugby League.
Australian Rugby League Hall of Fame	National	Rugby league	Hall of Fame	Managed by National Rugby League
Wallaby Hall of Fame	National	Rugby union	Hall of Fame	Managed by the Australian Rugby Union.
Australian Sailing Hall of Fame	National	Sailing	Hall of Fame	Managed by Australian Sailing with Australian National Maritime Museum
National Alpine Museum of Australia	Mount Buller, Victoria	Skiing	Museum	Located at Mt Buller Community Centre.
Softball Australia Hall of Fame	National	Softball	Hall of Fame	Managed by Softball Australia.
Squash Australia Hall of Fame	National	Squash	Hall of Fame	Managed by Squash Australia.
Surf Life Saving Hall of Fame	National	Surf life saving	Hall of Fame	Managed by Surf Life Saving Australia
Australian National Surfing Museum	Torquay, Victoria	Surfing	Museum	
Surf World	Currumbin, Queensland	Surfing	Museum	Museum that presents exhibitioins of surfboards, photographs, oral histories and memorabilia that explore the culture and character of the Gold Coast and Australia's surf heritage.
Australian Surfing Hall of Fame	National	Surfing	Hall of Fame	Managed by Surfing Australia
Swimming Australia Hall of Fame	National	Swimming	Hall of Fame	Managed by Swimming Australia
Table Tennis Australia Hall of Fame	National	Table tennis	Hall of Fame	Managed by Table Tennis Australia
Australian Tennis Museum	Sydney	Tennis	Museum	Located at Sydney International Tennis Centre.
Australian Tennis Hall of Fame	National	Tennis	Hall of Fame	Managed by Tennis Australia. Induction is recognised by a bronze bust which is later displayed in Garden Square at Melbourne Park.
Roy Emerson Museum	Blackbutt, Queensland	Tennis	Museum	The museum was put together by the Blackbutt and District Tourism and Heritage Association inside the old Nukku State School building, now known as "Nukku Nook" where Emerson went to school.
Tenpin Bowling Australia Hall of Fame	National	Tenpin bowling	Hall of Fame	Managed by Tenpin Bowling Australia
Triathlon Australia Hall of Fame	National	Triathlon	Hall of Fame	Managed by Triathlon Australia
Touch Football Hall of Fame	National	Touch football	Hall of Fame	Managed by Touch Football Australia
Volleyball Australia Hall of Fame	National	Volleyball	Hall of Fame	Managed by Volleyball Australia
Water Polo Australia Hall of Fame	National	Water polo	Hall of Fame	Managed by Water Polo Australia
Australian National Maritime Museum	Sydney	Water sports	Museum	Covers sailing, rowing, swimming and surf sports.
Australian Water Ski and Wakeboard Federation	National	Water skiing	Hall of Fame	
Australian Axeman's Hall of Fame and Timberworks	Latrobe, Tasmania	Woodchopping	Hall of Fame	
Australian Monster Truck Hall of Fame	National	Monster Trucks	Hall of Fame	Managed by Aussie Monsters
North Queensland Sports Hall of Fame	North Queensland	All Sports	Hall of Fame	Managed by North Queensland Sports Foundation

== Memorabilia museums ==
There are other museums in Australia that manage sport memorabilia. These include: National Museum of Australia and Powerhouse Museum.

== See also ==
Sport in Australia
