= Sport in rural and regional Australia =

Sport plays an important role in rural and regional Australia. Sport has been found to contribute to community identity, sense of place, social interaction and better health. Rural and regional Australian towns and cities are increasingly hosting sporting events that provide an economic stimulus and a sense of pride. These towns and cities have also developed many of Australia's elite athletes due to their unique social environment.

The importance of sport was highlighted by the fact that "After the general store, the pub and the cemetery, one of the first things established in many a fledgling Australian country town was a sporting facility. Commonly it was a racetrack, sometimes a footy ground or tennis court carved out of someone's back paddock; if the climate was hot and there was ample water, possibly a pool."

== Rural sports ==
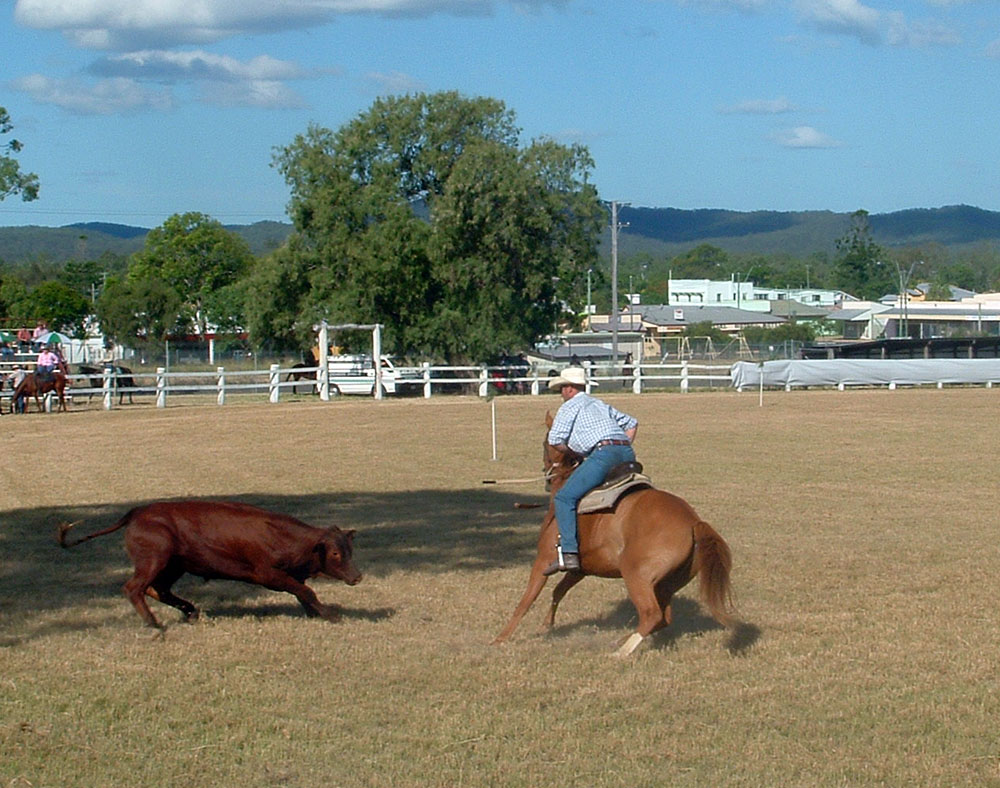
Campdrafting was a sport developed in Australia.

Many sports are the predominantly or exclusively played in rural areas. These sports often reflect the skills required to work in rural areas and include: polo, polocrosse, rodeo, campdrafting, tent pegging, endurance horse riding, woodchopping, shearing sports and Sheep Dog Trials.

== List of Sporting Events ==
Many Australian regional and rural towns have or currently host major sporting events. These events are used to showcase the town and assist in developing community spirit. Increasingly they are being used to provide an economic stimulus to towns. Examples of current and former events are listed in the table below.

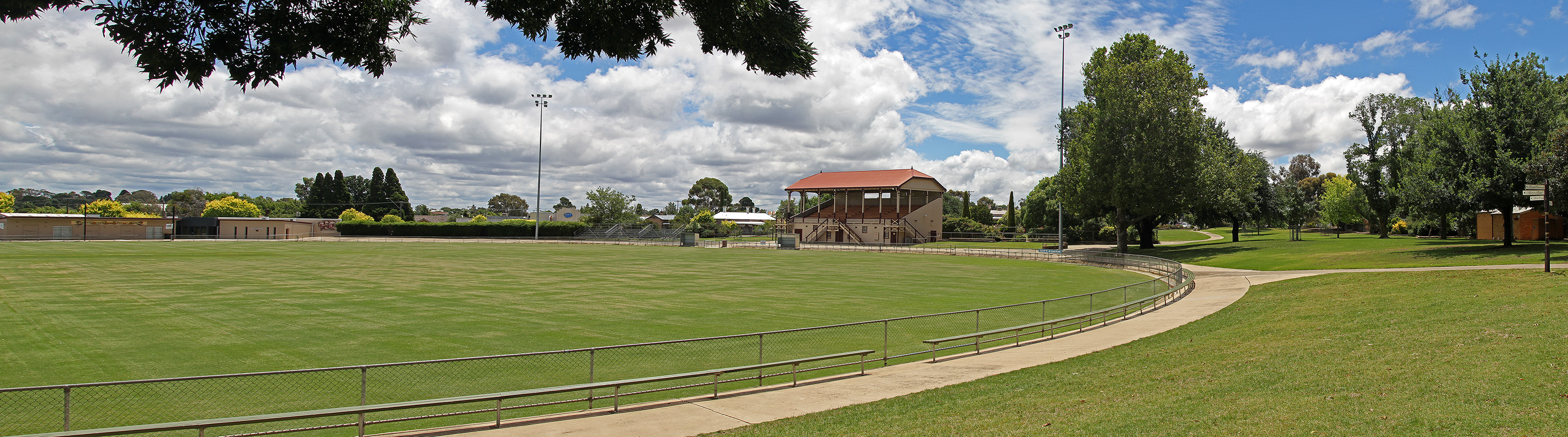
Central Park, Stawell, site of the Stawell Gift.

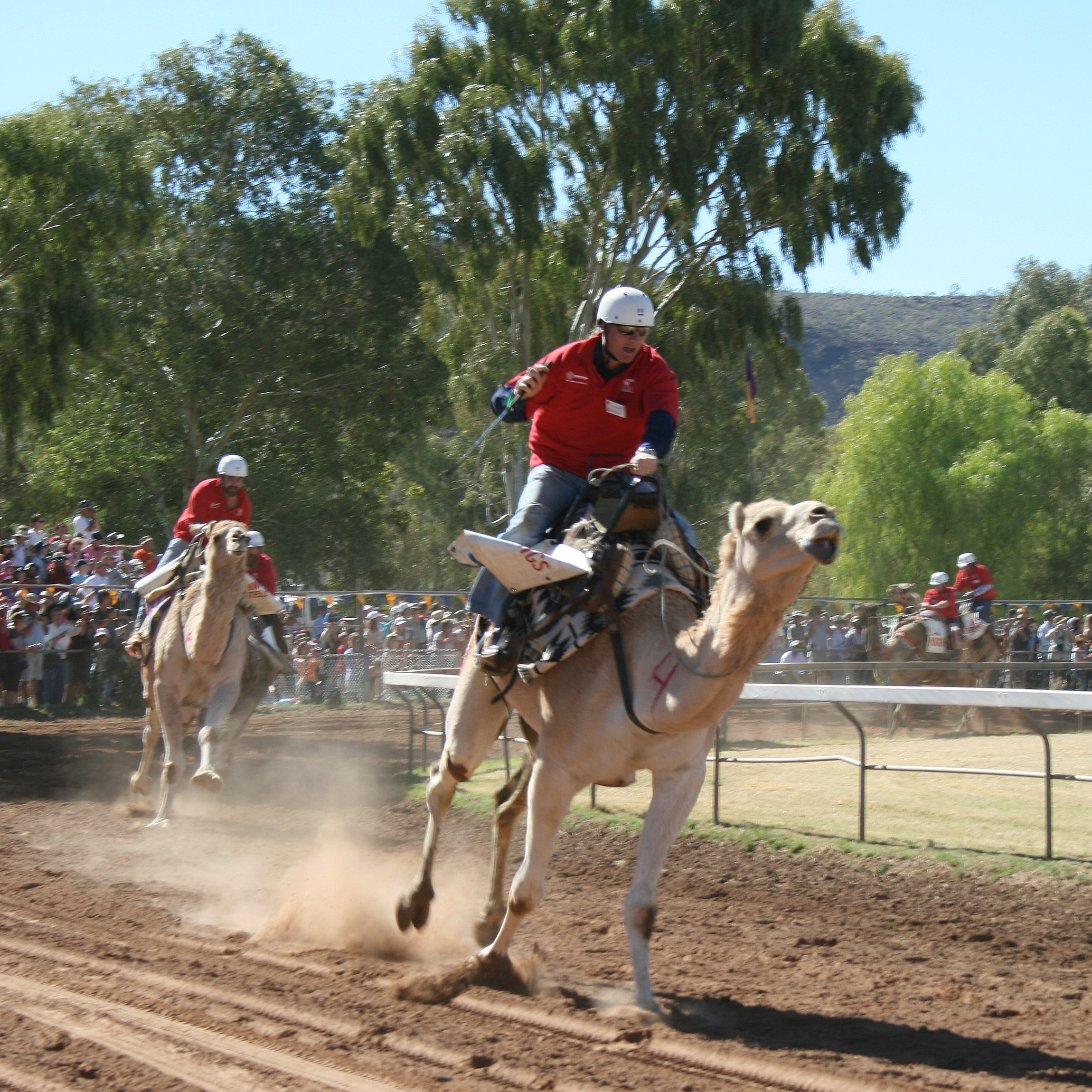
Camel racing during the 2009 Camel Cup.

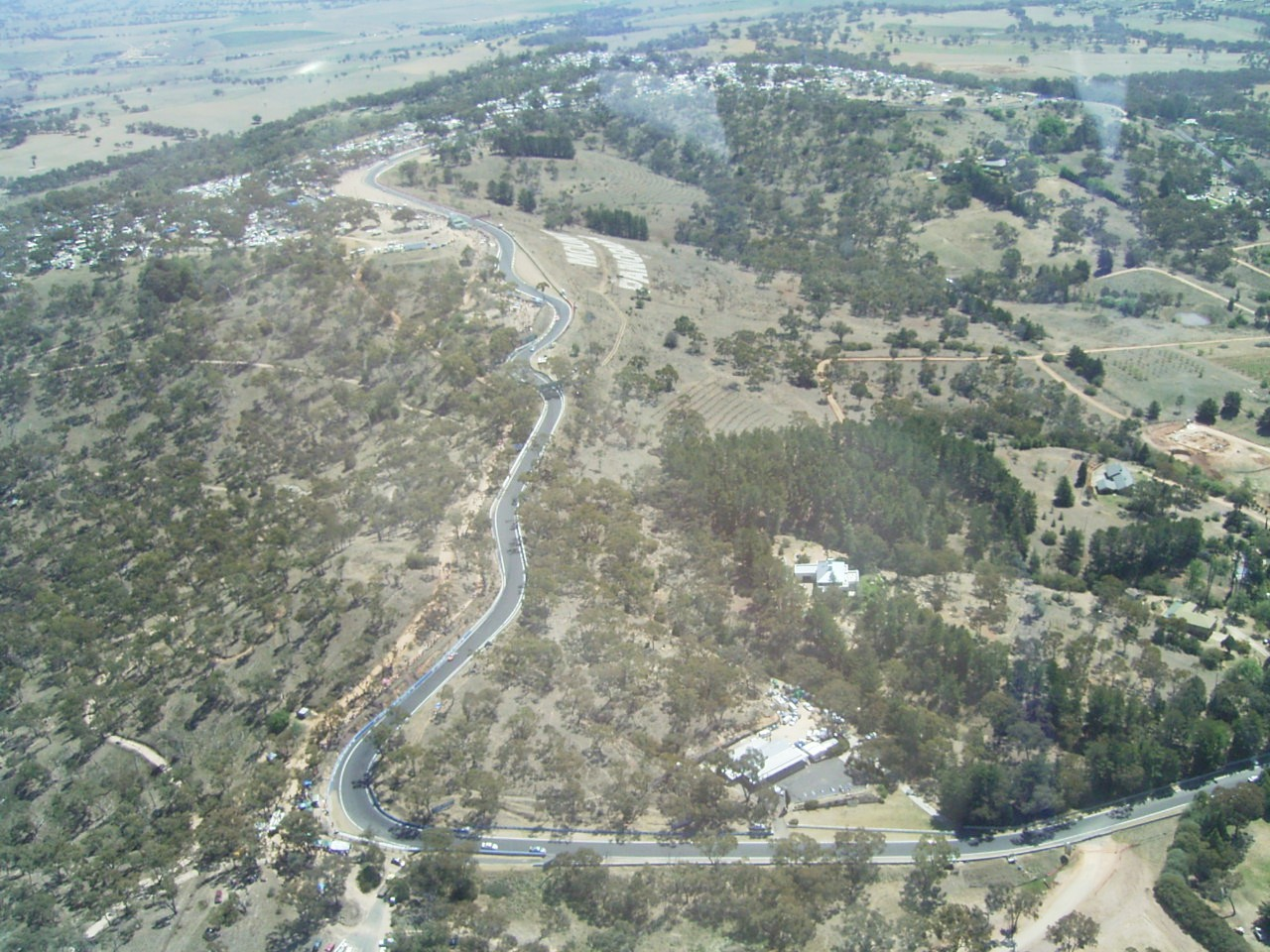
Mount Panorama Circuit, Bathurst. Aerial view of the summit, looking from Forrest's Elbow to Skyline and beyond.

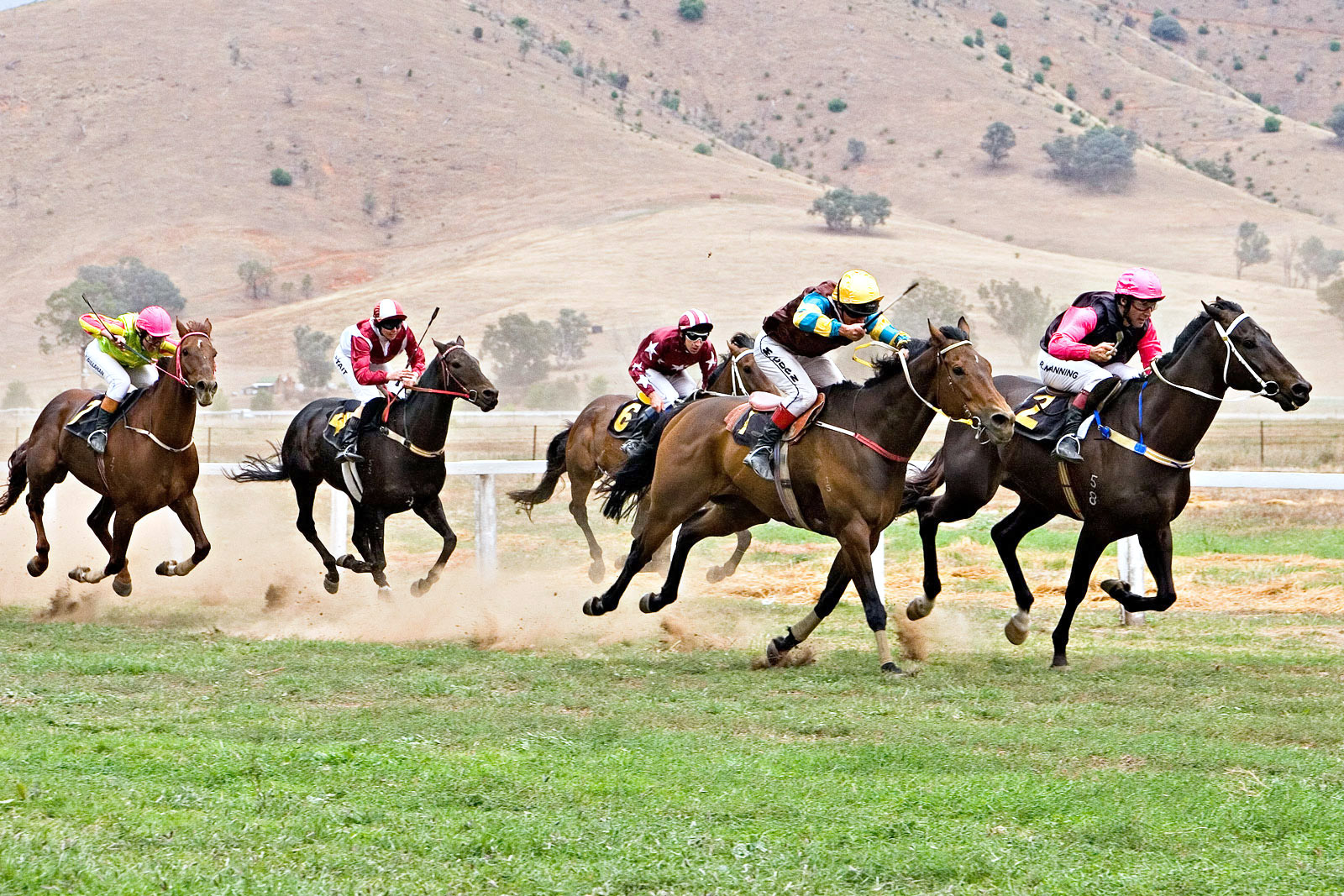
Tambo Valley Picnic Races, Victoria 2006

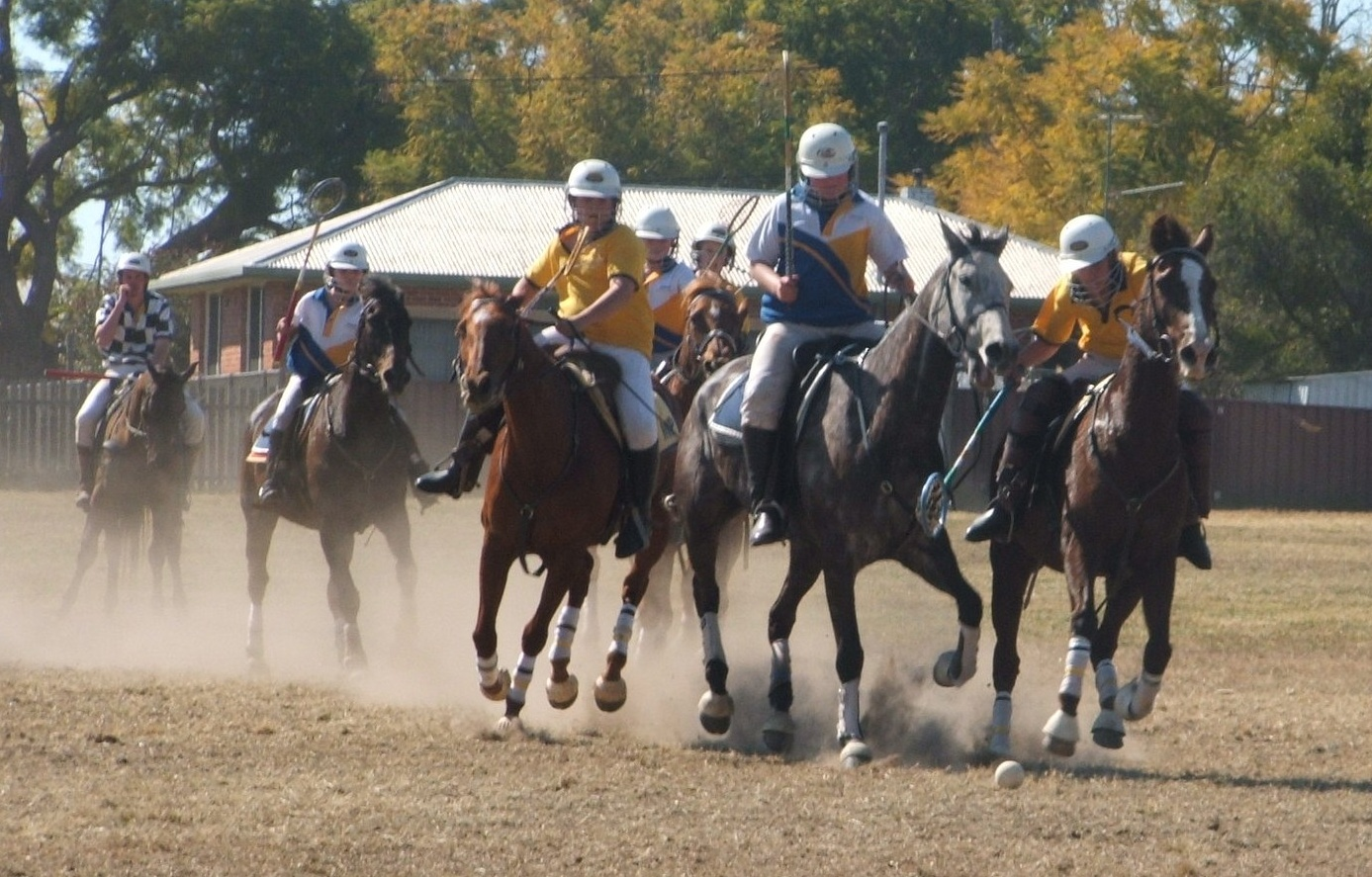
Playing polocrosse in New South Wales, Australia

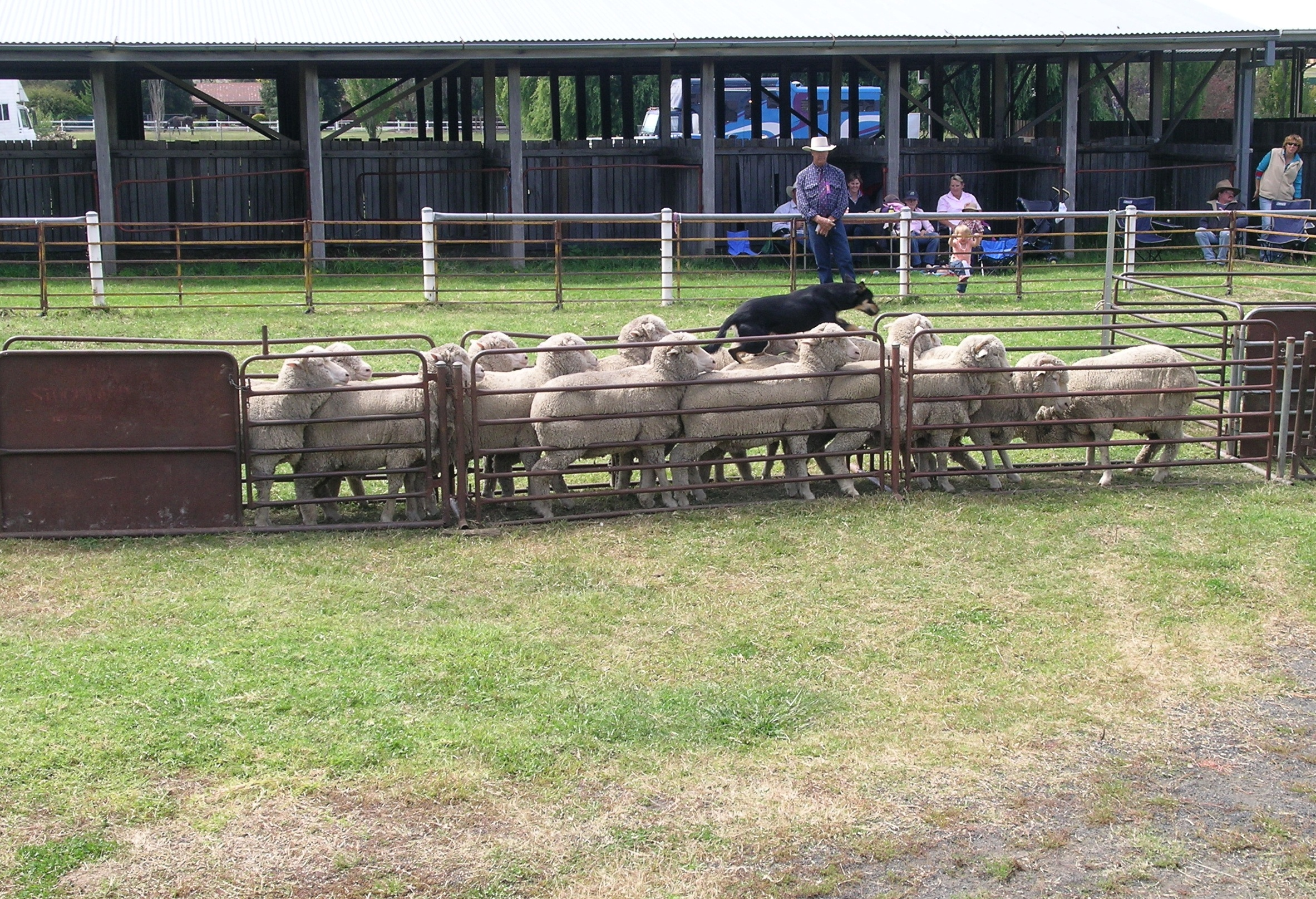
An Australian Kelpie running over the backs of sheep during a yard dog trial, Walcha, NSW

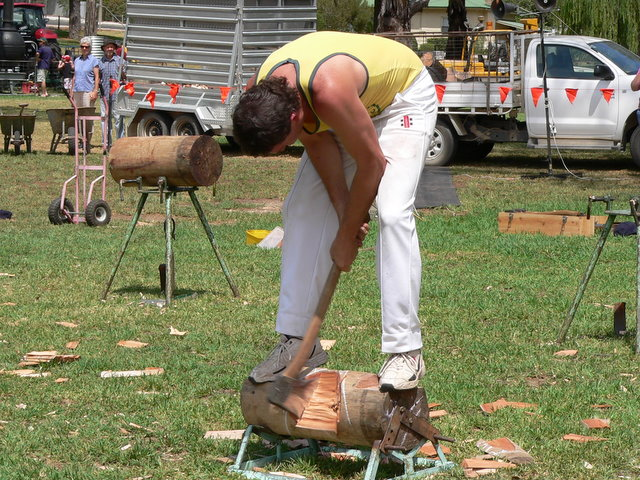
Woodchopping at the 2007 Angaston Show, South Australia

Sport	Event	State	Brief History
Athletics	Stawell Gift	Victoria	Started in 1878 in a professional athletics meeting held during Easter Central Park, Stawell in the Grampian Mountains district of western Victoria. It is Australia's richest professional sprinting event. It is the world's oldest and Australia's most famous professional athletics meeting.
Athletics	Sydney to Melbourne Ultramarathon	New South Wales / Victoria	An annual ultramarathon foot race held between 1983 and 1991. It was sponsored by the Westfield Group, with the start being at Westfield Parramatta in Sydney and the finish at Westfield Doncaster shopping centre in Melbourne. It travelled through New South Wales and Victorian towns.
Australian football	NAB Cup	Various states	Australian Football League plays pre-season games and hosts community camps in regional cities throughout Australia to promote their game. In 2016, regional cities to host games: new South Wales – Wagga Wagga; Queensland – Mackay; Victoria – Wangaratta, Shepparton; South Australia – Mount Barker; Tasmania – Beaconsfield; Western Australia – Mandurah. AFL regularly hosts premiership games in Alice Springs and Cairns.
Boxing	Jimmy Sharman's Boxing Troupe	Various states	Jimmy Sharman's Boxing Troupe from 1912 attended agricultural shows in Australia.
Camel racing	Camel Cup	Northern Territory	First held in Alice Springs in 1970 and is now an annual event.
Campdrafting	Warwick Gold Cup and Risdon Cups	Queensland	Its beginning can be traced back to the Tenterfield Show in 1885. Regular competitions are held in regional cities. The premier competitions are the Warwick Gold Cup and Risdon Cup which are held in Warwick, Queensland.
Canoeing	Murray River Canoe Marathon	Victoria / New South Wales	The event began in 1969 when 10 friends decided to raise money for the Australian Red Cross. It started in Yarrawonga, Victoria and finished in Swan Hill, Victoria.The event is now held in late November.
Cricket	Imparja Cup	Northern Territory	Annual cricket tournament started in 1994 and held in Alice Springs.
Cycling	Tour Down Under	South Australia	The event started in 1999 and is held in January and visits many regional areas of South Australia. The race concludes in the streets of Adelaide.
Cycling	Herald Sun Tour	Victoria	The event was first held in 1952 and traverses different regions in Victoria. It is currently held in early February.
Cycling	Tour of Tasmania	Tasmania	Established in 1930 but has not always been held annually.
Cycling	Australian National Road Race Championships	Victoria	The championships since 2007 have been held in Ballarat, Victoria.
Equestrian	Tom Quilty Gold Cup	Various states	100-mile endurance horse event was established in 1966 after R. M. Williams asked his friend Tom Quilty, a great horseman and cattleman in the Kimberly area of Western Australia, for his support for the 100 miles ride. Quilty donated $1000, which was used to make a gold cup, the prize for the winner of the event.
Horse racing	Birdsville Races	Queensland	The races were first held in 1882. The events in the isolated town of Birdsville, Queensland attracts up to 7,000 spectators. I is held in September and raises funds for the Royal Flying Doctor Service.
Horse racing	Picnic horse racing	Various states	Picnic racing in Australia has existed since the late 1800s. This was due to amateurs and pony racers being excluded from city race meetings. Picnic races were seen as a major social event in rural towns.
Motor sport	Bathurst 1000	New South Wales	It is a 1,000 kilometre touring car race held annually on the Mount Panorama Circuit in Bathurst, New South Wales. It is regarded as the pinnacle of motorsport in Australia and colloquially known as The Great Race among motorsport fans and media. The race concept originated with the 1960 Armstrong 500 at the Phillip Island Grand Prix Circuit, before being relocated to Bathurst in 1963.
Motor sport	Finke Desert Race	Northern Territory	The race commenced in 1976 as a 'there and back' challenge for a group of local motorbike riders to race from Alice Springs to the Finke River and return. It is held annually on the Queen's Birthday long weekend.
Motor sport	Australian Motorcycle Grand Prix	Various states	It has been held in Goulburn (1924), Bathurst (1940–1980 intermittently), Phillip Island (1989–1990, 1997 to present day)
Motor sport	Round Australia Trial	Various States	It was a motorsport rallying or rally raid event that was run on multiple occasions between 1953 and 1998, the first three being the Redex Trials.
Motor sport	Australian Rally Championship	Various states	The Championship has been held annually since 1968 and has been held in many Australian regional areas.
Polocrosse	World Cups	Queensland	Sport originated in Australia in 1939 There are over 150 Tournaments held around Australia, from Mount Isa, Queensland to Launceston, Tasmania and Yorke Peninsula, South Australia to Humpty Doo, Northern Territory. The inaugural 2003 and 2007 World Cups were held in Warwick, Queensland.
Rodeo	Australian rodeos	Various states	Newspaper reports recorded public roughriding events that took place in Victoria during the 1880s. The National Rodeo Council of Australia currently runs rodeos is rural towns throughout Australia.
Rowing	Henley-on-Todd Regatta	Northern Territory	Since 1962, a "boat" race is held annually in the typically dry sandy bed of the Todd River in Alice Springs, Australia.
Rugby league	City vs Country Origin	New South Wales	The annual clash between a City and Country team originally started in 1911 and since 1995 has been played in a regional city in New South Wales.
Rugby league	National Rugby League (NRL) Games	New South Wales/Queensland	There are several NRL teams located in regional cities – Newcastle Knights, St George Dragons (play games in Wollongong) and North Queensland Cowboys. NRL games have been held in regional cities: New South Wales – Albury, Bathurst, Cootamundra, Mudgee, Wagga Wagga; Queensland – Cairns, Mackay
Rugby union	National Rugby Championship (NRC)	New South Wales/Queensland	NRC includes two country teams – New South Wales Country Eagles and Queensland Country and they play matches in regional cities.
Sheepdog trials	Australian Sheep Dog Workers' Association (ASDWA) Events	Various states	The National Sheep Dog Trials have been held since 1943.
Surf boat racing	George Bass Marathon	New South Wales	The Marathon was first held in 1970 and it is the longest and hardest surfboat marathon in the world. The race starts at Batemans Bay with overnight stops at Moruya, Turross Head, Narooma, Bermagui, Tathra, Pambula, Merrmbula and finishes in Eden. The race covers part of the journey that George Bass made in 1797.
Tennis	Davis Cup	Various states	Several regional cities have hosted Davis Cup ties – Mildura, Victoria (Australia v Zimbabwe in 1998). Townsville, Queensland (Australia v Uzbekistan 1998 and v Thailand in 2008).
Tennis	Federation Cup	Victoria	Australia versus Switzerland in Mildura in 1999.
Tennis	Australian Hard Court Championships	Various states	This defunct tournament was held in several regional towns: Toowoomba, Queensland – 1939 & 1970; Launceston, Tasmania – 1995, 1964 and 1968.
Tennis	Australian Pro Tennis Tour	Various states	This tour encompasses 36 weeks of competition with more than $900,000 in prize money. It holds tournaments in regional towns throughout Australia.
Triathlon	Port Macquarie Ironman	New South Wales	Established in 1985 in North Coast town of Port Macquarie. The event consists of a 3.8 kilometre swim, 180 kilometre bike course and 42.2 kilometre run.
Wheelbarrow race	Black Rock Stakes	Western Australia	The Black Rock Stakes established in 1971. Men, women and children push a wheelbarrow full of iron ore 122 kilometres from Goldsworthy and into Port Hedland.
Woodchopping	Agricultural shows	Various states	Woodchopping events are now frequently held at major agricultural shows. The first recorded Australian contest was held in Tasmania in 1874. In 1891, a Latrobe, Tasmania tournament offered prize money of $2000.

== Sportspeople ==
A research term "Wagga effect" was devised to describe the disproportionately high number of elite sports men and women who come from Australian regional and rural cities. It is argued that regional and rural cities offer children more space to play, a range of sports, participation with adults due to low participation numbers and local sporting heroes. It has been stated that 60 per cent of the Australian team at the 2004 Athens Olympics grew up in rural and regional Australia. Besides developing international athletes, many Australian Football League (AFL) and National Rugby League players have their origins in country areas. In 2010, one-third of AFL players came from country Victoria.

=== Recognition ===
Several cities and towns have erected statues to recognise sportspeople and horses. These include:

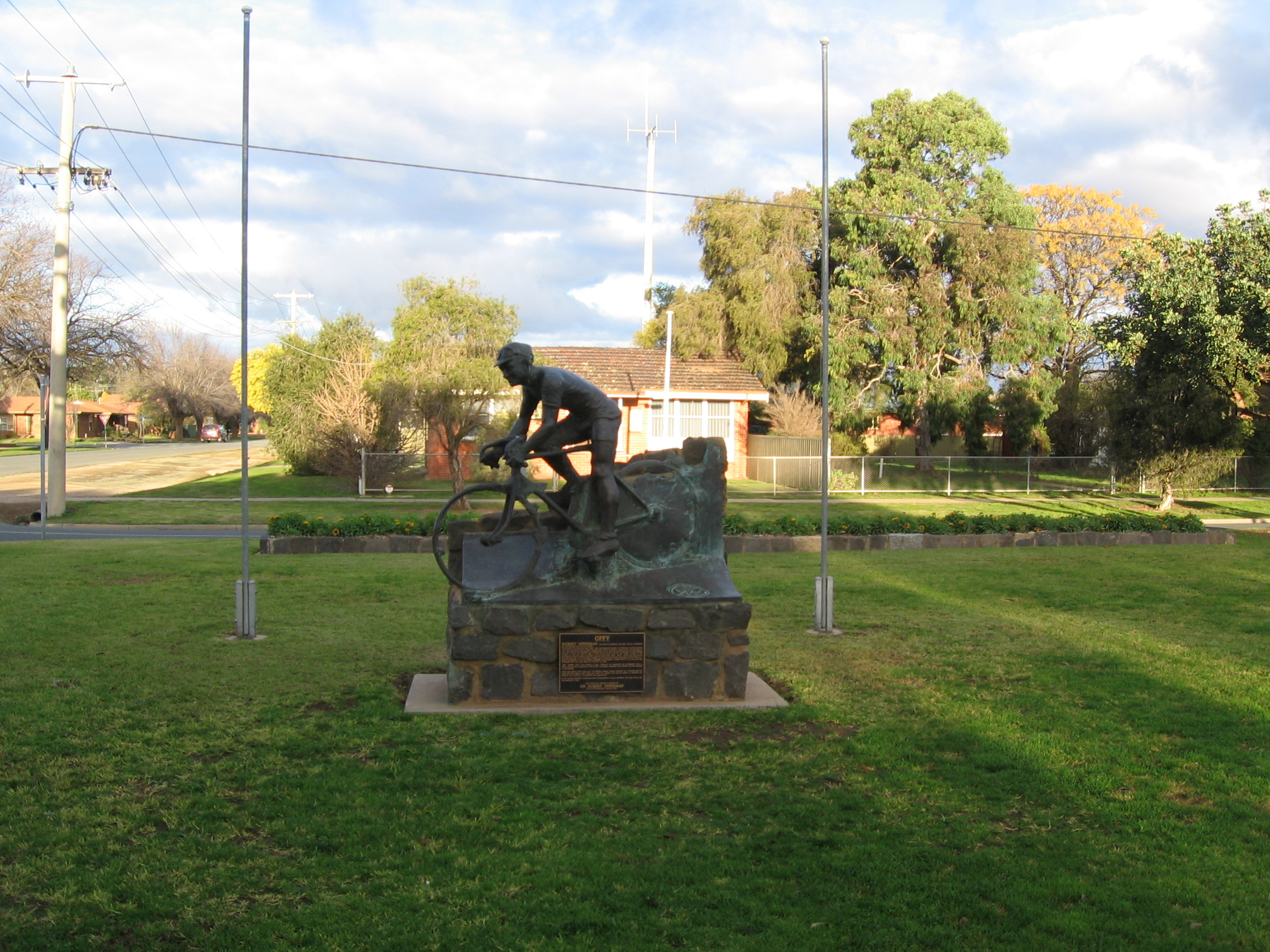
Hubert Opperman's statue in Rochester, Victoria

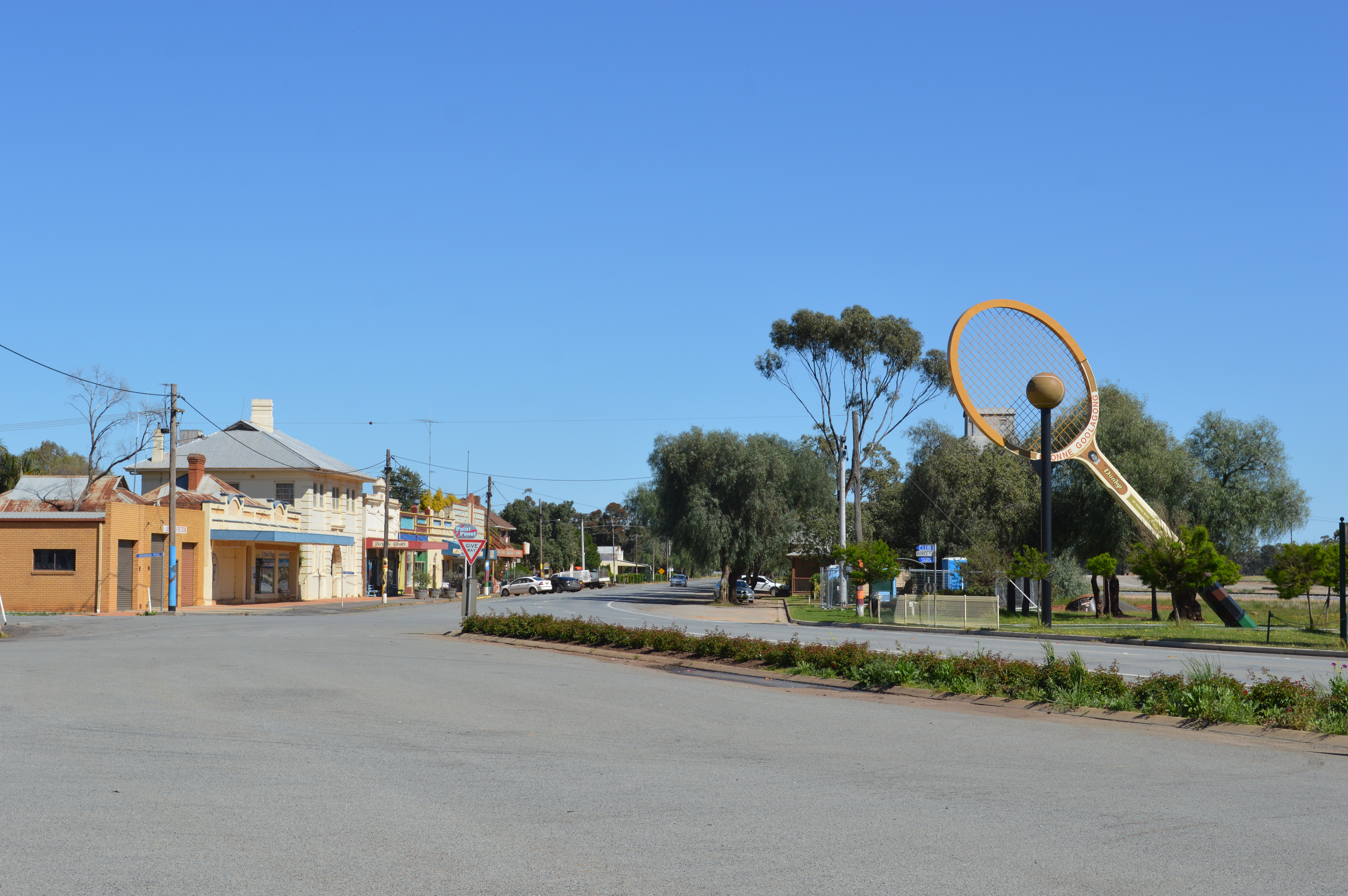
Big tennis racquet honouring Evonne Goolagong-Cawley in Barellan, New South Wales

- Athletes – Marjorie Jackson in Lithgow, New South Wales, Cliff Young in Beech Forest, Victoria
- Australian rules footballers – John Coleman in Hastings, Victoria, Darrel Baldock in Launceston, Tasmania
- Boxers – Les Darcy in East Maitland, New South Wales
- Cricketers – Adam Gilchrist in Bellingen, New South Wales, Glenn McGrath in Narromine, New South Wales, Don Bradman in Cootamundra, New South Wales
- Cyclists – Hubert Opperman in Rochester, Victoria
- Tennis players – Evonne Goolagong-Cawley in Barellan, New South Wales
- Racehorses – Gunsynd in Goondiwindi, Queensland, Black Caviar in Nagambie, Victoria, Paleface Adios in Temora, New South Wales, Bernborough in Oakey, Queensland, Patrobus in Rosedale, Victoria

In addition, many sportspeople from cities and towns have sports field and facilities named after them. Examples are:

== See also ==
- Sport in Australia
