= Paddle Australia =

Governing body for canoeing and kayaking in Australia

- Sport: Canoeing and kayaking
- Jurisdiction: Australia
- Founded: 1949
- Affiliation: International Canoe Federation (ICF)
- Affiliation date: 1951
- Regional affiliation: Oceania Canoe Association (OCA)
- Headquarters: Sydney Olympic Park, New South Wales
- President: Andrew Trim
- CEO: Kim Crane

Official website
- paddle.org.au
- (Australia)

Paddle Australia is the governing body for the sport of canoeing and kayaking in Australia.

== History ==
Former logo

The body was founded in Bexley, New South Wales on 10 September 1949 as the Australian Canoe Federation and affiliated with the International Canoe Federation in 1951. In 1996, the Australian Canoe Federation at its Annual General Meeting adopted a new Constitution and changed the name of the association to Australian Canoeing Inc. In 2015, this was changed to Australian Canoeing Ltd. In June 2018, the organization rebranded as Paddle Australia Ltd.
