= Eddie Gilbert (cricketer) =

Indigenous Australian cricketer (1905-1978)

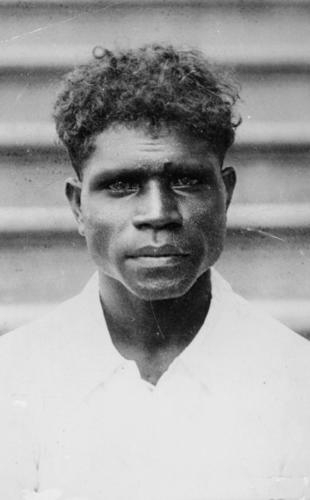

Personal information
- Full name: Harold Edward Gilbert
- Born: 1 August 1905; Woodford, Queensland, Australia
- Died: 9 January 1978 (aged 72); Wacol, Queensland, Australia
- Batting: Left-handed
- Bowling: Right arm fast
- Role: Bowler

Domestic team information
- Years: Team
- 1930/31–1935/36: Queensland

Career statistics
Competition	First-class
Matches	23
Runs scored	224
Batting average	7.22
100s/50s	0/0
Top score	34*
Balls bowled	4,920
Wickets	87
Bowling average	28.97
5 wickets in innings	6
10 wickets in match	0
Best bowling	6/64
Catches/stumpings	4/–
- Source: CricketArchive, 12 January 2010

Harold Edward Gilbert (1 August 1905 – 9 January 1978), known as Eddie Gilbert, was an Australian Aboriginal (Kaanju) cricketer who represented Queensland in the Sheffield Shield. He was described as an exceptionally fast bowler. He competed for Queensland in the Sheffield Shield between 1930 and 1936. Described by Don Bradman as the fastest bowler he ever faced, Bradman said he was “faster than anything seen from (England fast bowler) Harold Larwood or anyone else.”

== Early and personal life ==
Gilbert was taken from his home near Woodford at the age of three as part of the Stolen Generations and grew up on farms while living in the Barambah Aboriginal Reserve, now known as Cherbourg, north of Brisbane. He took up cricket at a young age, initially playing as a slow bowler but quickly developing pace cultivated through a flexible wrist that he said was from years of hard work and practice.

== Cricket career ==
=== First class career ===
After playing with the State Colts in 1930, Gilbert was selected in the Queensland Sheffield Shield team for 1930/31. Gilbert was probably only the fifth Aboriginal Australian to play first-class cricket in Australia, after Twopenny in 1870, Johnny Mullagh in 1879, Jack Marsh in 1900, and Albert Henry in 1902. (Note that the 1868 Aboriginal cricket tour of England was not considered first-class.)

In his first season with Queensland Gilbert played five of their six Sheffield Shield games, racking up fifteen wickets in the process. Gilbert had bowled upward of 141 overs and had a bowling average of 33.46. His best performance was 4–44. Overall, in his first season with the team, Gilbert had finished with the 13th best bowling average amongst bowlers whom had bowled more than 15 overs.

Following on from his first season with Queensland, Gilbert played five of Queensland's six matches in 1931–32. With the team having had better results than the previous season, Queensland saw Gilbert bowl less and take more wickets (21). Both of those factors also greatly improved Gilbert's bowling average. At seasons-end Gilbert had taken the fifth most wickets in the competition and had earned his first five-wicket haul against Victoria (5–67).

In Gilbert's third season in the Sheffield Shield (1932–33), he played only two games for Queensland, whom finished last losing all six games. The first was against Victoria in late October and the first of the season. In Victoria's first innings, Gilbert, whom only bowled eight overs, finished 0–58. Teammate and Australia bowler Ron Oxenham finished 4–95. Victoria's first and only innings was impressive finishing on 552. Victoria won by an innings and 329 runs, the biggest of the season. In the second game of the season, against South Australia (27–31 January), Gilbert entered for Queensland's first innings as a tail-ender, finishing the innings 1*, helping Queensland finish their first innings on 129 runs. Gilbert's bowling proved to be vital for Queensland in South Australia's first innings. Indeed, it was his best performance of the season. With Herbert Gamble and Francis Brew dismissing the opening two batsman (caught), Gilbert bowled out top-order batsman Roy Lonergan for 31. Brew then took another and Cassie Andrews took his first via lbw. Gilbert then took three wickets in a row to finish the innings 4–58. South Australia's second innings remained steady (76/1), however and Gilbert's second innings was unsuccessful having not taken any wickets. Queensland lost by 9 wickets.

In his career, Gilbert played in 19 Sheffield Shield matches, taking 73 wickets at an average of 29.75. A further 14 wickets were taken off touring MCC, West Indies and South African sides. In one match against the touring West Indian team, he took 5/65. Despite his success, it is unlikely that he was ever seriously considered for the Australian Test team due to doubts about his action, his Aboriginality and the fact that he represented Queensland, then a relatively weak team.

=== The era of 'protection' ===
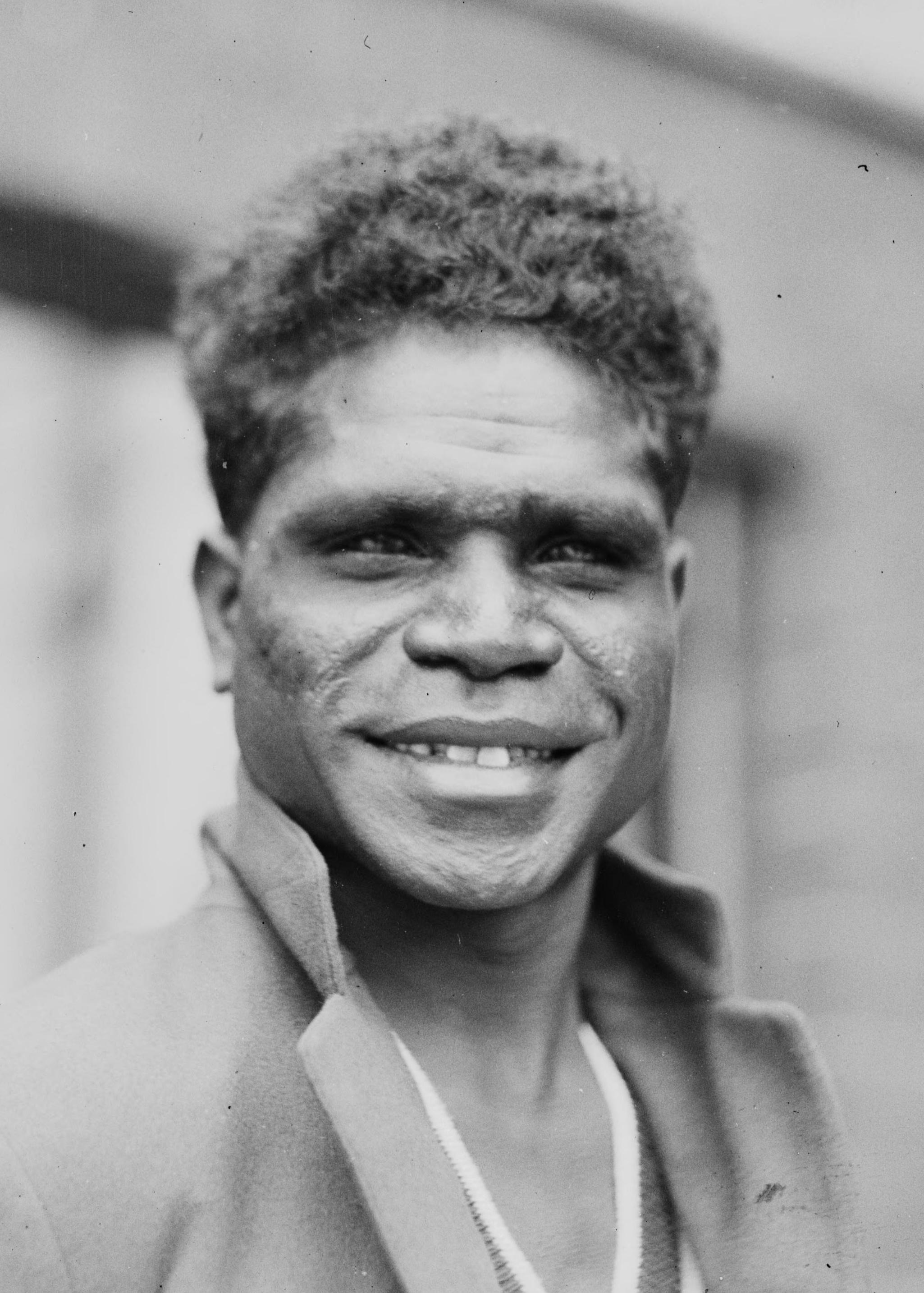
Gilbert in April 1932

As an Aboriginal man living in Queensland in 1931, Eddie Gilbert was bound by the restrictions of the Protection of Aboriginals Act 1897. This meant that he needed written permission to travel from his Aboriginal settlement each time he played in a first-class match. Reference to his correspondence survives in the Queensland State Archives. (QSA A/4736, Home Secretary, Register of Letters Received, 1931, Extracts - Aborigines General).

=== Retirement ===
Gilbert retired from the game in 1936 due to poor form, whereupon officials in the Queensland Cricket Board and the Aboriginal Protectorate arranged for his return to an Aboriginal settlement. Gilbert died at the Wolston Park Hospital near Brisbane on 9 January 1978, aged 72 after many years of ill health due to alcoholism and mental illness. It was thought by some people that his health issues stemmed from the racism he suffered: he was not being allowed to room with the team and made to sleep in a tent on the practice pitch. In addition, he was forced out of the game and labelled a cheat because of his suspect bowling action.

In 2015 Gilbert's son Barney unveiled the sign at the dedication of the Eddie Gilbert Memorial Field near the hospital, with folk singer Dermot Dorgan offering his tribute song "Eddie Gilbert" about the life and struggles of the iconic fast bowler.

== Dismissing Bradman ==
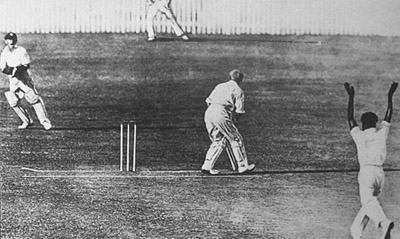
Gilbert dismisses Bradman for a duck in November 1931

On 6 November 1931 in a match against NSW at the recently opened Brisbane Cricket Ground (the "Gabba") in Brisbane, he dismissed opener Wendell Bill for a duck with his first ball. The incoming batsman was Don Bradman.

Bradman was hurried by Gilbert, but he somehow managed to keep the first ball out. The second was a harmless one, just outside leg. The third ball was too quick: it screamed past Bradman's bat and thudded into the gloves of Leonard Waterman. The fourth was as fast, and hit Bradman on his underbelly. The impact knocked his bat off, leaving him in agony. It took him time, but he got back to his feet. Then came the bouncer, a really quick one. Bradman tried to counterattack, but it was too quick. The top-edge went up in the air, and Waterman took it easily.

Bradman recalled years later that the five deliveries he faced from Gilbert in that match were the fastest he had experienced in his career. Bradman said The keeper took the ball over his head, and I reckon it was halfway to the boundary and that the balls from Gilbert were unhesitatingly faster than anything seen from Larwood or anyone else. Although as he added in his autobiography, Bradman thought Gilbert's action was 'decidedly suspect'.

Gilbert played against Bradman on two more occasions, as well as Douglas Jardine during the infamous 1932/33 Bodyline tour.

== Bowling style ==
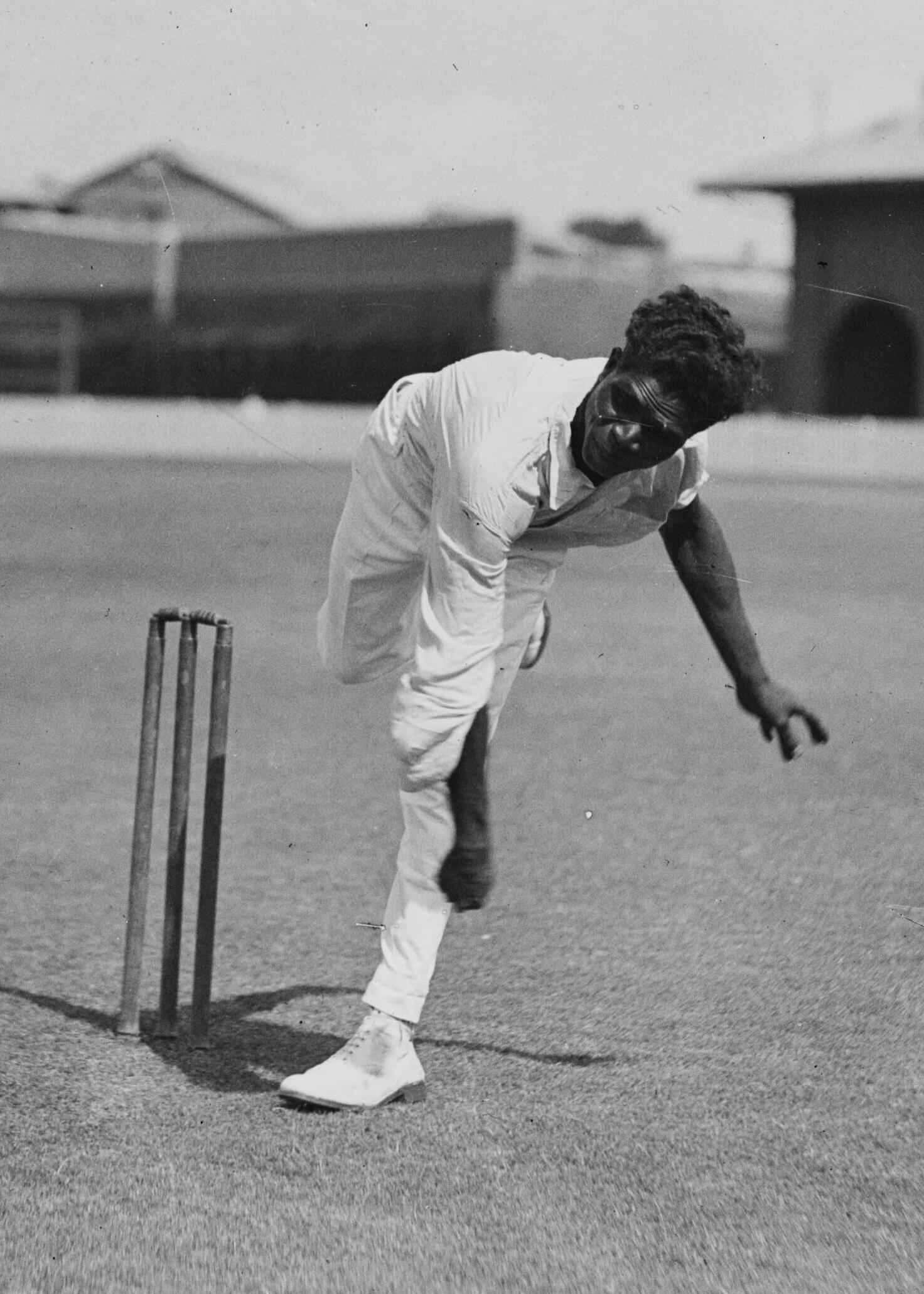
Gilbert in his follow-through, c. 1930

Though he had a controversial action he was called only once for throwing and that for jerking his wrist. Importantly the straightness of his arm was never contradicted by umpires. The occasion of him being called was the match between Victoria and Queensland at the MCG in 1931. The umpire Andrew Barlow, no-balled him 13 times for his action.

Alan McGilvray said he had "absolutely no doubt" that Gilbert was "the fastest bowler I ever saw" and that "no matter how I analyse cricket down the years, I cannot imagine anybody bowling a ball faster than Eddie Gilbert". Of the legality of Gilbert's action, McGilvray commented, "It was hard to tell whether he actually chucked or not, because he let the ball go with such a fling of his right arm you got precious little sight of it."

== Recognition ==
In 2007 Queensland Cricket erected a bronze statue of Gilbert in Greg Chappell Street, outside Allan Border Field, Albion. Designed by Pauline Clayton, the statue shows Gilbert in full flight. The monument was dedicated in November 2008. In 2007, Indigenous Sport Queensland established the Eddie Gilbert Medal to recognise Queensland's best indigenous sports person.

== See also ==
- List of cricketers called for throwing in top-class cricket matches in Australia
- 1868 Aboriginal cricket tour of England
- Twopenny - Aboriginal Australian who played for New South Wales against Victoria in 1870
- Johnny Mullagh - Aboriginal Australian who played for Victoria against the MCC in 1879
- Albert Henry - Aboriginal Australian who played for Queensland from 1902 to 1905
