= Bullocky (cricketer) =

Australian cricketer

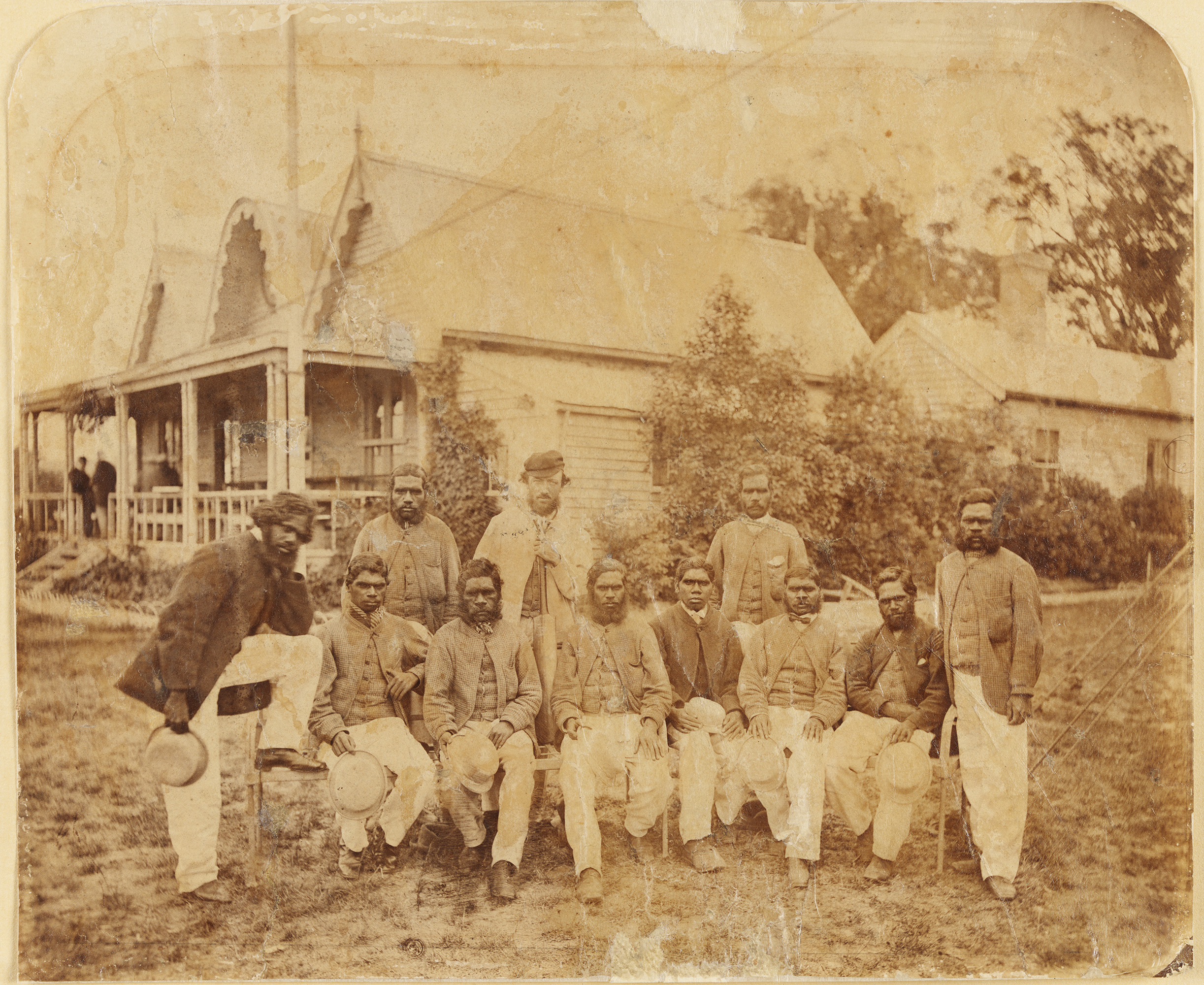
- Bullocky (front row, second from right) with the 1867 Aboriginal cricket team

Personal information
- Full name: Harry Bullocky (born Harry Bullchanach/Bullchanah)
- Born: Wimmera region, Victoria, Australia
- Died: 1890 (aged ~53)
- Batting: Right-handed
- Role: Opening batsman & wicket-keeper

Domestic team information
- Years: Team
- 1866/67: Victoria XI
- 1866/67–1869–69: Aboriginal XI
- Source: CricketArchive, 17 July 2025

Harry Bullocky (born Harry Bullchanach or Bullchanah) (died 1890) was an Aboriginal Australian cricketer who joined the 1868 Aboriginal cricket tour of England. He was a right-handed opening batsman and wicket-keeper. He was referred to as "at once the black Bannerman and Blackham of his team", and his wicket-keeping was favourably compared to Tom Lockyer.

Much of the details of Bullocky's life remain obscure. His date of birth and ancestry are not known. His nick-name Bullocky is an Anglicised approximation to his traditional name, and may be a reference to the Australian term "bullocky", meaning the driver of a bullock team. He spent much of his life working on agricultural stations in the Wimmera region of western Victoria. He received some cricket training from Tom Hamilton at Bringalbert Station, and moved to work for Charles Officer at Mount Talbot Station alongside other Aboriginal cricketers.

He played for a Victoria XI against a Tasmanian XVI in January 1867, alongside Johnny Cuzens. As a result, they are thought to be the first people of Aboriginal descent to play inter-colony cricket, although the match is not considered to have first-class status. Bullocky joined the Aboriginal cricket team that toured in England in 1868. He sailed to England with most of the team, leaving Sydney on the Parramatta on 8 February 1868. He played 39 matches on the tour in May to October 1868. Often opening the batting, he was also the main wicket-keeper, although occasionally the role was taken by Johnny Mullagh. Bullocky stumped 28 batsmen off the bowling of Charles Lawrence, standing up at the stumps. He played 61 innings on the rough pitches of the time which favoured the bowlers, scoring 569 runs at a batting average of 9.33, and coming fourth in the batting averages. He scored 64 not out against Hastings, but he was mysteriously "absent ill" for the second innings in a two-day match against the MCC at Lord's on 12–13 June (there has been speculation that he was unfit, having become drunk the night before).

After he returned to Australia, he continued to work on the stations, and to play cricket. He opened the batting alongside Johnny Mullagh for Harrow against Apsley in 1872. He also captained the Lake Condah Mission team.

Bullocky died of congestion of the lungs in 1890 aged 53.
