= Australian Aboriginal cricket team in England in 1868 =

Australian cricket team

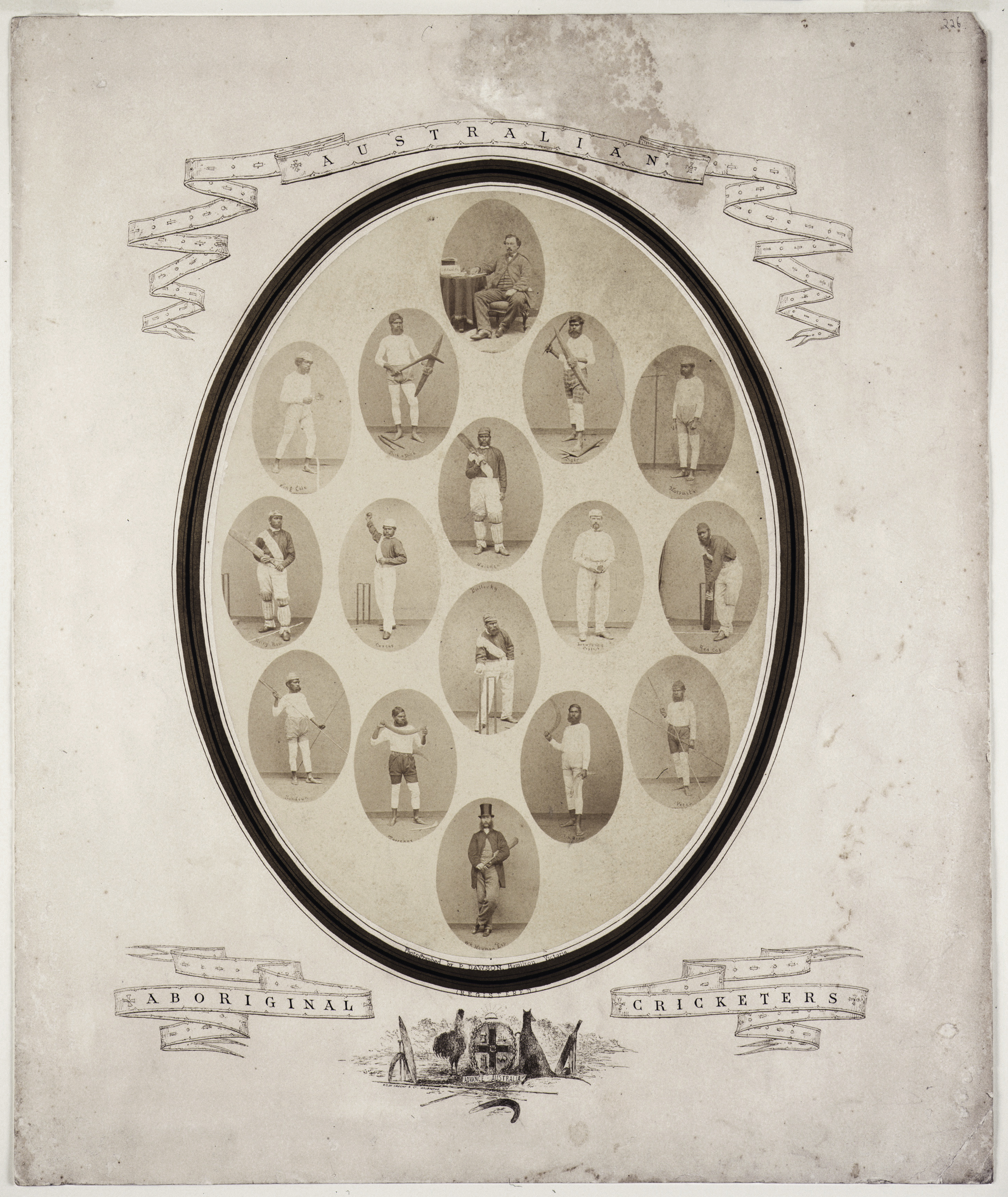
Australian aboriginal cricketers, Hamilton/Warrnambool, Victoria, 1867

In May to October 1868, a cricket team composed of Aboriginal Australians toured England, becoming the first organised group of Australian sportspeople to travel overseas. It would be another ten years before an Australian cricket team classed as representative left the country.

The concept of an Aboriginal cricket team can be traced to pastoral stations in the Western District of Victoria, where, in the mid-1860s, the European owners introduced Aboriginal station hands to the sport. An Aboriginal XI was created with the assistance of Tom Wills, the captain of the Victorian cricket team and founder of Australian rules football, who acted as the side's captain-coach in the lead-up to and during an 1866–67 tour of Victoria and New South Wales. Several members of the team joined what became the Aboriginal XI that toured England under the captaincy of Englishman Charles Lawrence.

International sporting contact was rare in that era. Previously, only three cricket teams had travelled abroad, all English, to the United States and Canada in 1859, and to Australia in 1861–62 and 1863–64.

== Background ==
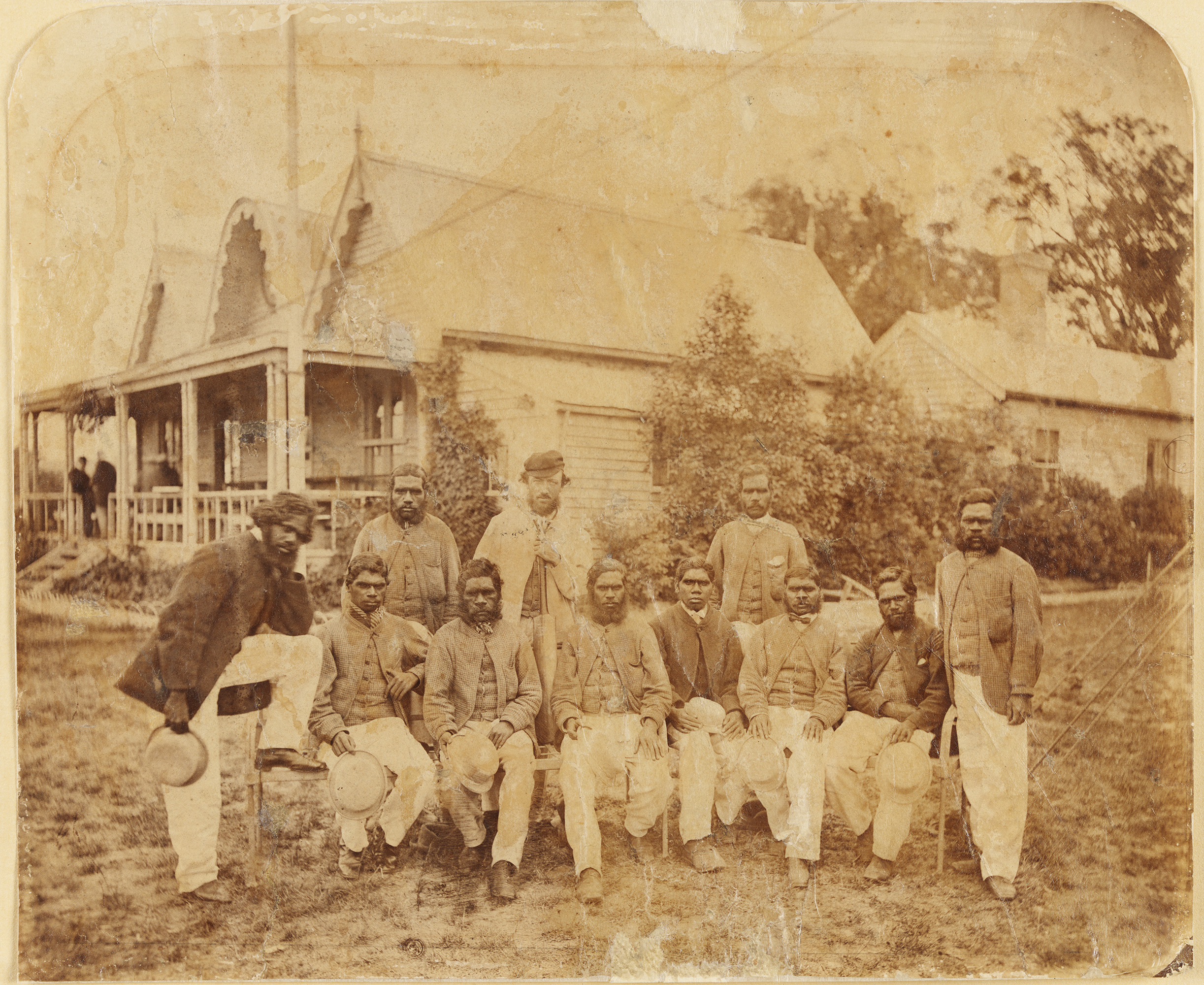
The Aboriginal cricket team pictured with their captain and coach Tom Wills at the Melbourne Cricket Ground, December 1866

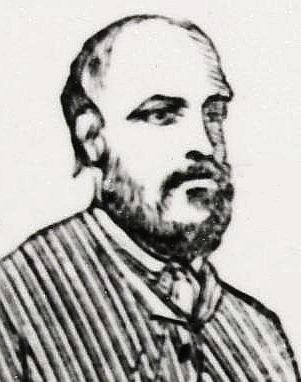
Coach and captain Tom Wills, 1866

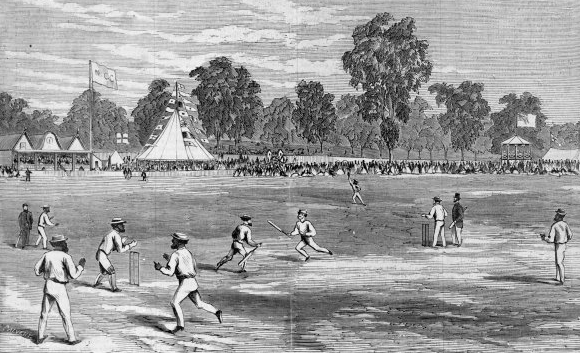
The Aboriginal team playing against Melbourne Cricket Club at the MCG, early 1867

The 1850s and 1860s saw a rapid increase in the popularity of cricket in Australia. In the Western District of Victoria, from the early 1860s onwards, cricket matches took place between Aboriginal Australians and European settlers at local pastoral properties, where many Aboriginal people were employed as station hands. The Aboriginal people were admired for their athletic skills and, in early 1866, a series of matches were staged with the intention of selecting the strongest possible Aboriginal XI. Thomas Gibson Hamilton of Bringalbert Station, near Edenhope, created a team which he coached. They played an exhibition match at Hamilton, which gained the attention of Tom Wills.

The resulting team was initially coached by local pastoralist William Hayman. Coaching duties were later turned over to Wills, captain of the Victoria cricket team and founder of Australian rules football, who spoke to the team in the Djab Wurrung language he had learnt as a child growing up in the Western District among the Djab Wurrung people. To commentators at the time, Wills' decision to join and help the team was something of a puzzle given that, only five years earlier, he had survived the Cullin-la-ringo massacre in Queensland, in which his father and 18 other European colonists were murdered by local indigenous people. "It was always a matter of wonder how Tom could be friendly with the blacks, considering that they murdered his father", one sportswriter noted.

On Boxing Day 1866, in front of over 10,000 spectators, Wills captained the team against the Melbourne Cricket Club at the Melbourne Cricket Ground. Bell's Life in Victoria reported: "Seldom has a match created more excitement in Melbourne than the one under notice, and never within our recollection has a match given rise to so much feeling on behalf of the spectators." "The veteran Wills never captained an eleven who so thoroughly possessed the sympathies of the spectators," wrote a Melbourne correspondent for The Sydney Mail. "A dark skin suddenly became a passport to the good graces of Victorians." Although they lost to the MCC, the Aboriginal players were commended for their performance, and showed marked improvement on a subsequent tour of country Victoria.

An entrepreneur, Captain Gurnett, persuaded the team to travel to Sydney to begin a planned tour of the colonies and England. However, after their arrival in Sydney in February 1867, Gurnett embezzled some of the funds raised to finance the enterprise, leaving the team stranded. They were looked after by Charles Lawrence at his Manly Hotel, and he organised a number of games, completing a tour of New South Wales before returning to Victoria in May. Four players succumbed to the effects of illness: "Sugar" and "Watty" died on tour, while "Jellico" and "Paddy" died shortly afterward.

== Team members ==
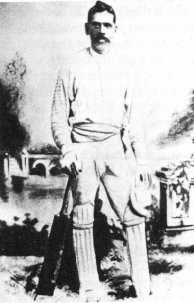
Johnny Mullagh, the team's star all-rounder

In 1867, Charles Lawrence was contracted to captain-coach Australia's "First Eleven" that toured England in 1868. Lawrence played for Surrey in 1855, the all Ireland XI in 1862, and the all England XI in 1863. He was contracted to be the first professional cricket coach in New South Wales, and he first saw the indigenous team under the instructions of Tom Wills who played a match at the Albert Ground, Sydney. On this occasion there was some contract disagreement between the failed sponsor Gurnett and Wills, and the players were left in Sydney. Lawrence was instructed to look after the Aboriginal players. At this time Lawrence was a publican and billeted the players in his hotel in Manly until he could arrange some cricket matches to raise money to return the players to the Western District of Victoria. In 1867, he trained the players for two months at "Lake Wallace" in Edenhope in the Wimmera before selecting the below side to tour England in 1868. Surrey County Cricket Club also supplied one of its ground staff (William Shepherd) to accompany the aboriginal tour as occasional relief player and umpire.

The tour was financed by Sydney Lawyer George Graham. Along with his cousin George Smith (who had been Mayor of Sydney in 1859), and William Hayman, they all travelled to England for the tour.

- Charles Lawrence – captain-coach
- Johnny Mullagh – traditional name: Unaarrimin
- Bullocky – traditional name: Bullchanach. A wicketkeeper, Bullocky was referred to as "at once the black Bannerman and Blackham of his team".
- Sundown – traditional name: Ballarin
- Dick-a-Dick – traditional name: Jungunjinanuke
- Johnny Cuzens – traditional name: Zellanach
- King Cole – traditional name: Bripumyarrimin
- Red Cap – traditional name: Brimbunyah
- Twopenny – traditional name: Murrumgunarriman
- Charley Dumas – traditional name: Pripumuarraman
- Jimmy Mosquito – traditional name: Grougarrong, who "could walk upright under a bar and then jump it in a stander".
- Tiger – traditional name: Boninbarngeet
- Peter – traditional name: Arrahmunijarrimun
- Jim Crow – traditional name: Jallachniurrimin
- William Shepherd - umpire, assistant, and occasional player-captain

During June, "King Cole" died from tuberculosis and was buried in Victoria Park Cemetery in what is now Tower Hamlets in London. Sundown and Jim Crow went home in August due to ill-health. None of the Aboriginal players were paid for participating in the tour.

== Tour ==
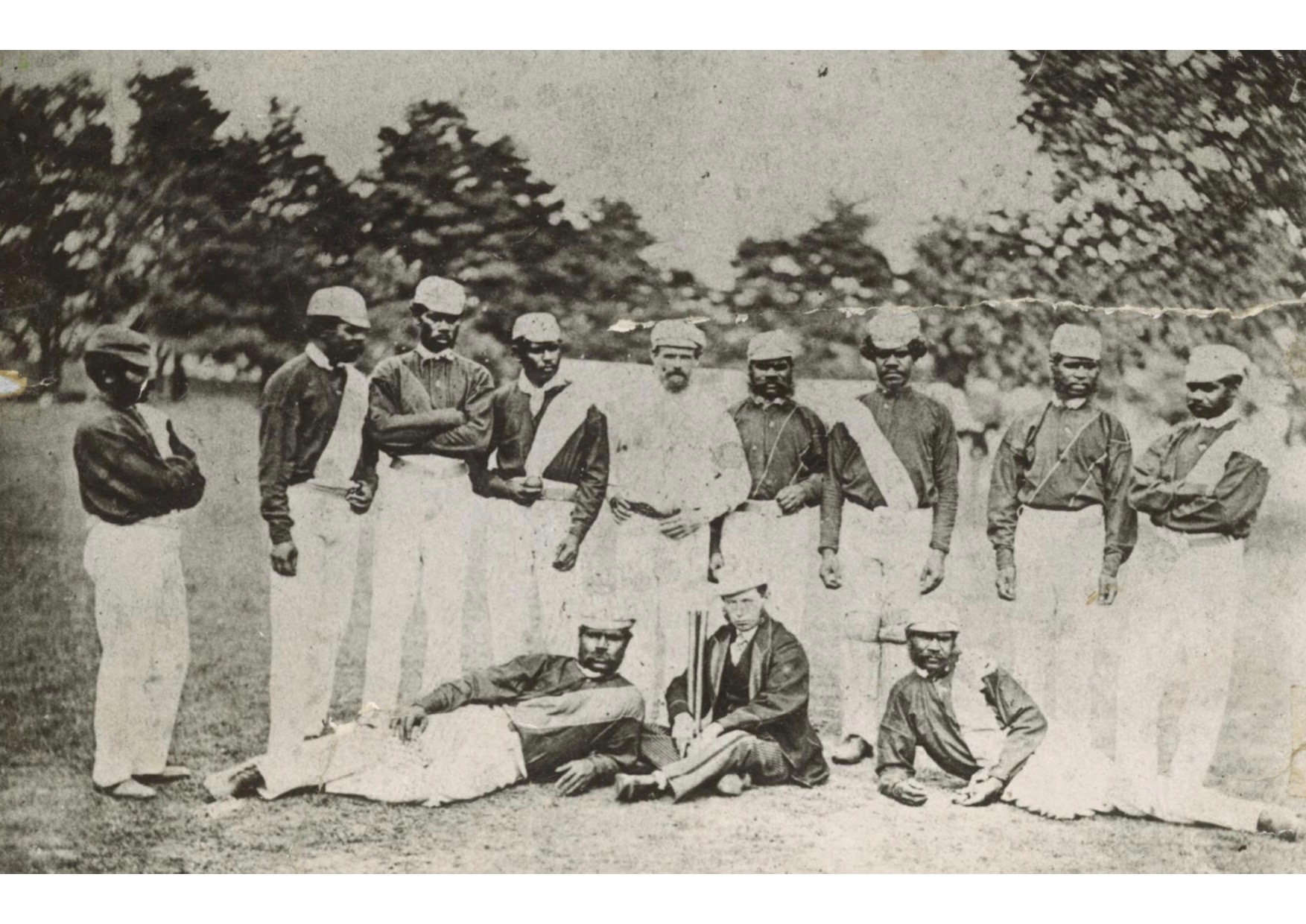
Aboriginal cricket team in England 1868 with captain and coach Charles Lawrence (and William Shepherd).

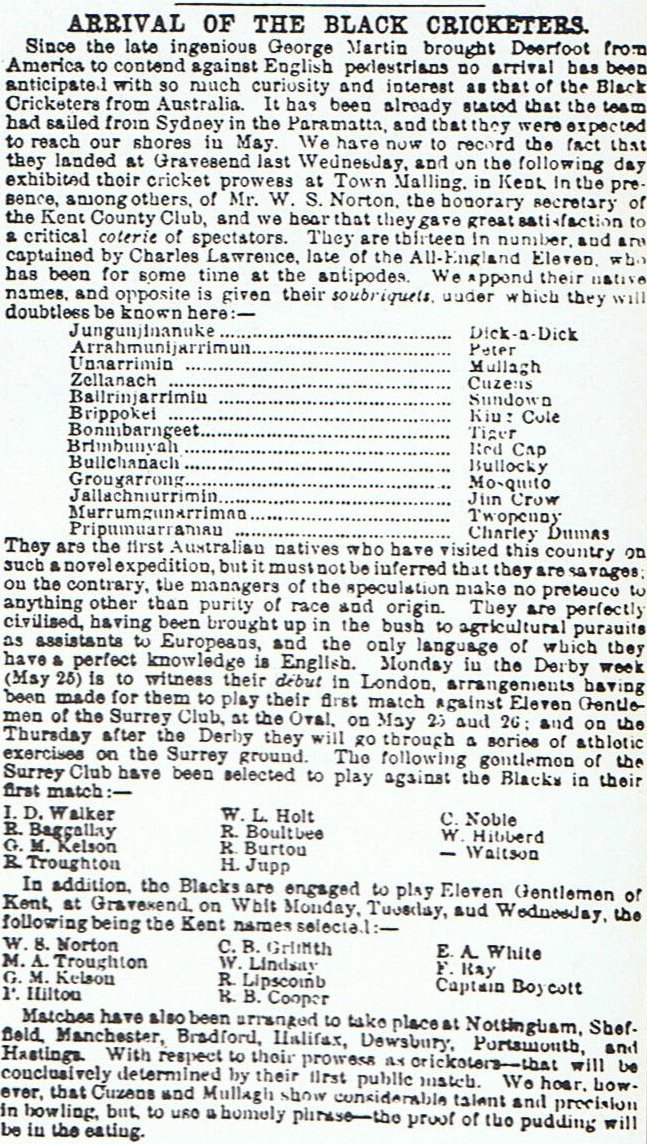
The Sporting Life, London 16 May 1868: The arrival of the Australian Aboriginal cricket team in England.

Having played an exhibition match attended by Prince Alfred at the Albert Ground, the side departed Sydney aboard the Parramatta on 8 February 1868. Arriving in Gravesend on 13 May, they spent time recovering from the journey in Town Malling before travelling to London. They were met with a degree of fascination – being the period of the evolutionary controversies following publication of Charles Darwin's The Origin of Species in 1859. Reaction was mixed. The Times described the tourists as, "a travestie upon cricketing at Lord's", and, "the conquered natives of a convict colony." The Daily Telegraph said of Australia that, "nothing of interest comes from there except gold nuggets and black cricketers."

The first match was played on 25–26 May at the Oval in London, attracting 20,000 spectators. Presumably many of the spectators attended out of curiosity, rather than merely to savour a cricket contest. The Times reported:

"Their hair and beards are long and wiry, their skins vary in shades of blackness, and most of them have broadly expanded nostrils. Having been brought up in the bush to agricultural pursuits under European settlers, they are perfectly civilised and are quite familiar with the English language."

The Daily Telegraph wrote:

It is highly interesting and curious, to see mixed in a friendly game on the most historically Saxon part of our island, representatives of two races so far removed from each other as the modern Englishman and the Aboriginal Australian. Although several of them are native bushmen, and all are as black as night, these Indian fellows are to all intents and purposes, clothed and in their right minds.

In total, the Aboriginal team played 47 matches throughout England over a period of six months, winning 14, losing 14 and drawing 19, a good result that surprised many at the time. Their skills were said to range from individuals who were exceptional athletes down to two or three team members who hardly contributed at all. The outstanding player was Johnny Mullagh. He scored 1,698 runs and took 245 wickets. George Tarrant, an admired English fast bowler of the time, bowled to Mullagh during a lunch interval and later said, "I have never bowled to a better batsman."

In addition to playing cricket, the Aboriginal players frequently put on exhibitions of boomerang and spear throwing at the conclusion of a match. Dick-a-Dick would also hold a narrow parrying shield and invite people to throw cricket balls at him, which he warded off with the shield. The Aboriginal team were narrowly beaten in a cricket-ball-throwing competition by an emerging English all-rounder of star quality, the 20-year-old W. G. Grace, who threw 118 yards.

On 16 October, members of Surrey County Cricket Club as well as the general public gathered in Canterbury Music Hall, London, where each of the touring cricketers was presented with a commemorative bat.

== Aftermath ==
The team arrived back in Sydney in February 1869. They played a match against a military team the following month, then split up. Twopenny later moved to New South Wales and played for the colony against Victoria in 1870. Cuzens died of dysentery the following year. Mullagh was employed as a professional by the Melbourne Cricket Club and represented Victoria against the touring English team in 1879, top-scoring in the second innings.

In 1869 the Central Board for Aborigines ruled that it would be illegal to remove any Aboriginal person from the colony of Victoria without the approval of the government minister. That effectively curtailed the involvement of Aboriginal players in the game.

When Mullagh died in August 1891, aged 50, he was reported to be the last surviving member of the team other than Lawrence, who died in 1917. However, Red Cap is now believed to have died between 1891 and 1894, and Tarpot died in April 1900.

William Shepherd wrote some observations about the players 51 years later, published in Ayres Cricket Companion in the year of his death, 1919.

== Legacy ==
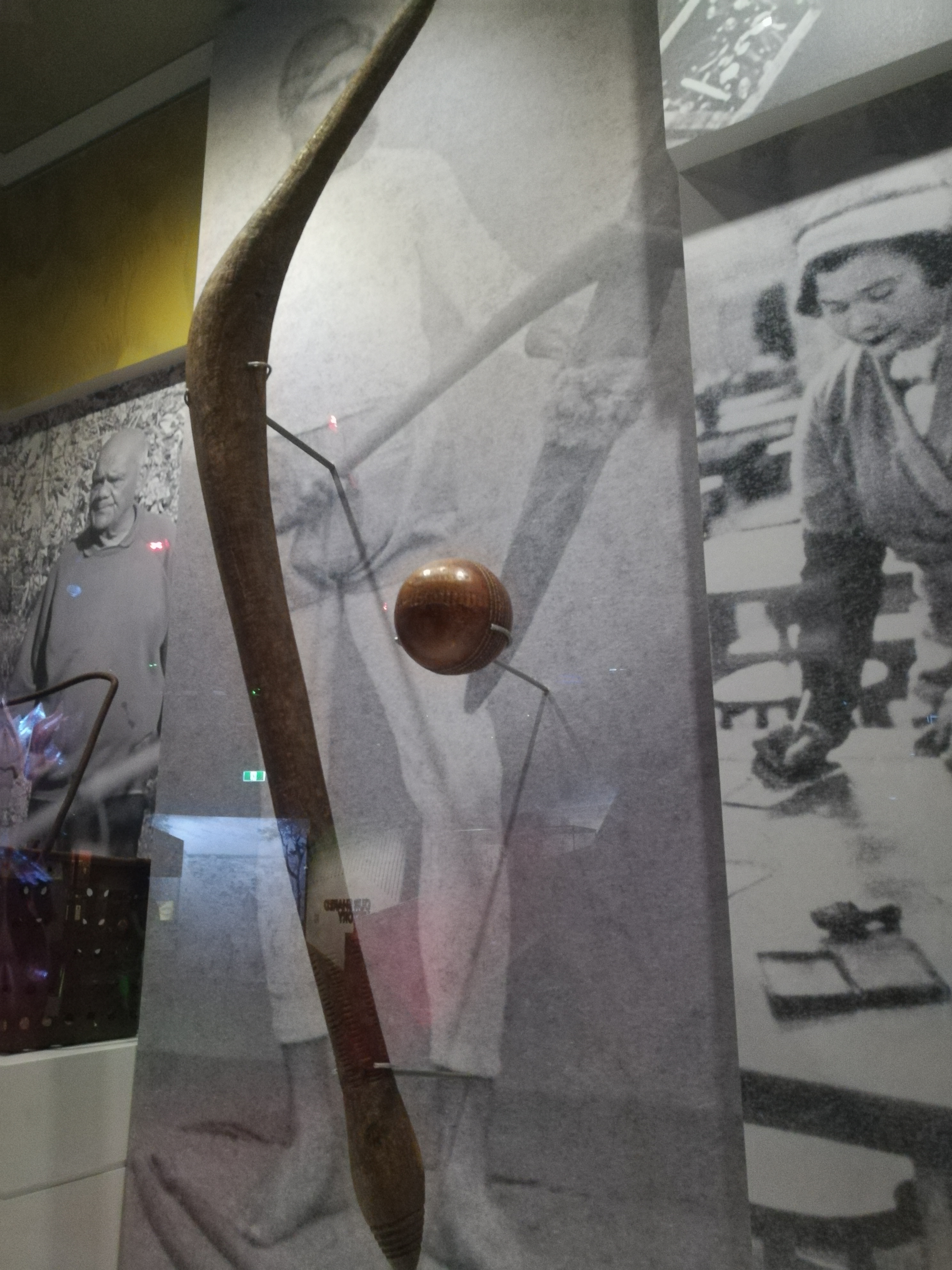
An Aboriginal weapon owned by Dick-a-Dick next to a cricket ball owned by Tom Wills, on display at the Melbourne Museum

On 13 October 1951, former Australia captain Vic Richardson unveiled a memorial to the side in Edenhope, Victoria, where the players had trained prior to the tour.

In May 1988, an Aboriginal team captained by John McGuire visited England to mark the Australian Bicentenary, retracing the steps of the 1868 side. Vince Copley of the Ngadjuri people assisted in organising the tour, about which a documentary entitled Dreaming of Lords was shown the following year on Channel 4 in the United Kingdom.

In 2002, Charles Lawrence's great-great-grandson, Ian Friend, along with historians and cricketers, including former Test captain Ian Chappell, successfully campaigned to have the Aboriginal XI recognised in the Sport Australia Hall of Fame. Ian Friend and Jack Kennedy (descendant of Johnny Cuzens) both accepted the award on behalf of the team. Also that year, a documentary film about the team, titled A Fine Body of Gentlemen, was broadcast by the ABC.

- 2004 – The 1868 team members were presented with cap numbers by Cricket Australia.
- 2004 – The Johnny Mullagh interpretative centre opened in Harrow in the Wimmera.
- 2018 – Australia Post released a stamp celebrating 150 years since the 1868 tour.
- 2018 – Cricket Australia held a smoking ceremony at Johnny Mullagh's sacred water hole in Harrow, celebrating 150 years since the tour.

Australia sent men's and women's Aboriginal teams to England in June 2018, to mark the 150th anniversary of the tour.

In December 2019, Cricket Australia revealed plans for the Johnny Mullagh Medal, to be awarded to the best player in the Boxing Day Test match from 2020. The medal is a recreation of the belt buckle he wore with the addition of a picture of the 1868 team.

A play about the cricketers, Black Cockatoo, written by Geoffrey Atherden and employing an all-Aboriginal cast, was staged at the 2020 Sydney Festival.

In January 2020, Len Pascoe encouraged singer/songwriter Matt Scullion to write a song about the tour, having been talking about it to Gamilaraay elder and retired cricketer Les Knox. Scullion wrote the song, "1868", and sang it at the second Twenty20 International at the Sydney Cricket Ground in early 2021, and planned to do so again at the Bradman Museum in April 2021.

A number of Aboriginal artefacts brought to England by the tour party are preserved in the collection of the Royal Albert Memorial Museum in Exeter. A club used by Dick-a-Dick is also in the possession of the Marylebone Cricket Club.

== See also ==
- Australian cricket team
- History of Test cricket (to 1883)
- List of matches of the Australian Indigenous cricket team
