= Dreaming of Lords =

- Directed by: Bob Ellis
- Written by: Bob Ellis; Ernie Dingo
- Produced by: Mark Manion
- Narrated by: Ernie Dingo
- Production company: Contagion Films
- Release date: 1988
- Running time: 93 minutes
- Country: Australia
- Language: English

Dreaming of Lords is a 1988 Australian documentary about the May 1988 cricket tour of an Australian team, fully made up of Aboriginal Australians.

The team, captained by John McGuire, visited England to mark the Australian Bicentenary and it called back to the teams visit in 1868 which this documentary also discussed.
