= Twopenny (cricketer) =

Australian cricketer (1845–1883)

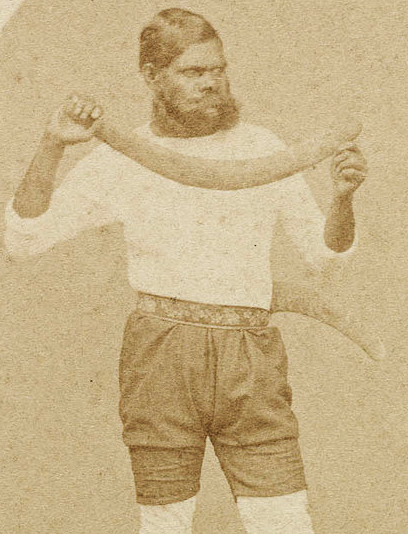
- Twopenny in 1867

Personal information
- Full name: Murrumgunarriman
- Born: circa 1845; Bathurst, New South Wales
- Died: 12 March 1883; Maitland, New South Wales
- Nickname: Jarrawuk
- Bowling: Right-arm fast roundarm
- Role: Bowler

Domestic team information
- Years: Team
- 1869–1870: New South Wales
- Only FC: 24 February 1870 New South Wales v Victoria

Career statistics
Competition	First-class
Matches	1
Runs scored	8
Batting average	4.00
100s/50s	0/0
Top score	8
Balls bowled	120
Wickets	0
Bowling average	–
5 wickets in innings	0
10 wickets in match	0
Best bowling	0/15
Catches/stumpings	0/–
- Source: CricInfo, 14 August 2012

Twopenny (also Jarrawuk or Murrumgunarrimin) (c. 1845 – 12 March 1883) is generally acknowledged as the first Aboriginal Australian to play first-class cricket.

He was born in Bathurst, New South Wales. He joined the Australian Aboriginal cricket team on its tour to England in 1868. He was primarily a fast bowler, and a hard-hitting lower order batsman. His bowling was limited initially over concerns that his bowling action might be illegal, but taking advantage of the recent change in the Laws of Cricket to allow overarm bowling, he took 9/9 and 6/7 against an East Hampshire side at Southsea, and then 9/17 and 3/39 against a Hampshire team at Southampton. He played in 46 of the 47 matches on the tour, scoring 589 runs at an average of 8.29, and taking 35 wickets at an average of 6.9 from 704 balls bowled. Playing against a Sheffield team at Bramall Lane in August 1868, he hit the ball so far and high that the batsmen were able to run nine runs (with no overthrows).

He played in a single first-class match for New South Wales against Victoria in February 1870, scoring 8 and 0, and taking 0/41 and 0/15. In a timeless match, scores were similar after the first innings, but Victoria scored 337 in their second innings, and won by 265 runs.

He died in West Maitland, New South Wales, from dropsy.

== See also ==
- Johnny Mullagh – Aboriginal Australian who played for Victoria against the MCC in 1879
- Jack Marsh – Aboriginal Australian who played for New South Wales from 1900 to 1902
- Albert Henry – Aboriginal Australian who played for Queensland from 1902 to 1905
- Eddie Gilbert – Aboriginal Australian who played for Queensland from 1930 to 1936
- List of New South Wales representative cricketers
