= William Shepherd (English cricketer) =

English cricketer

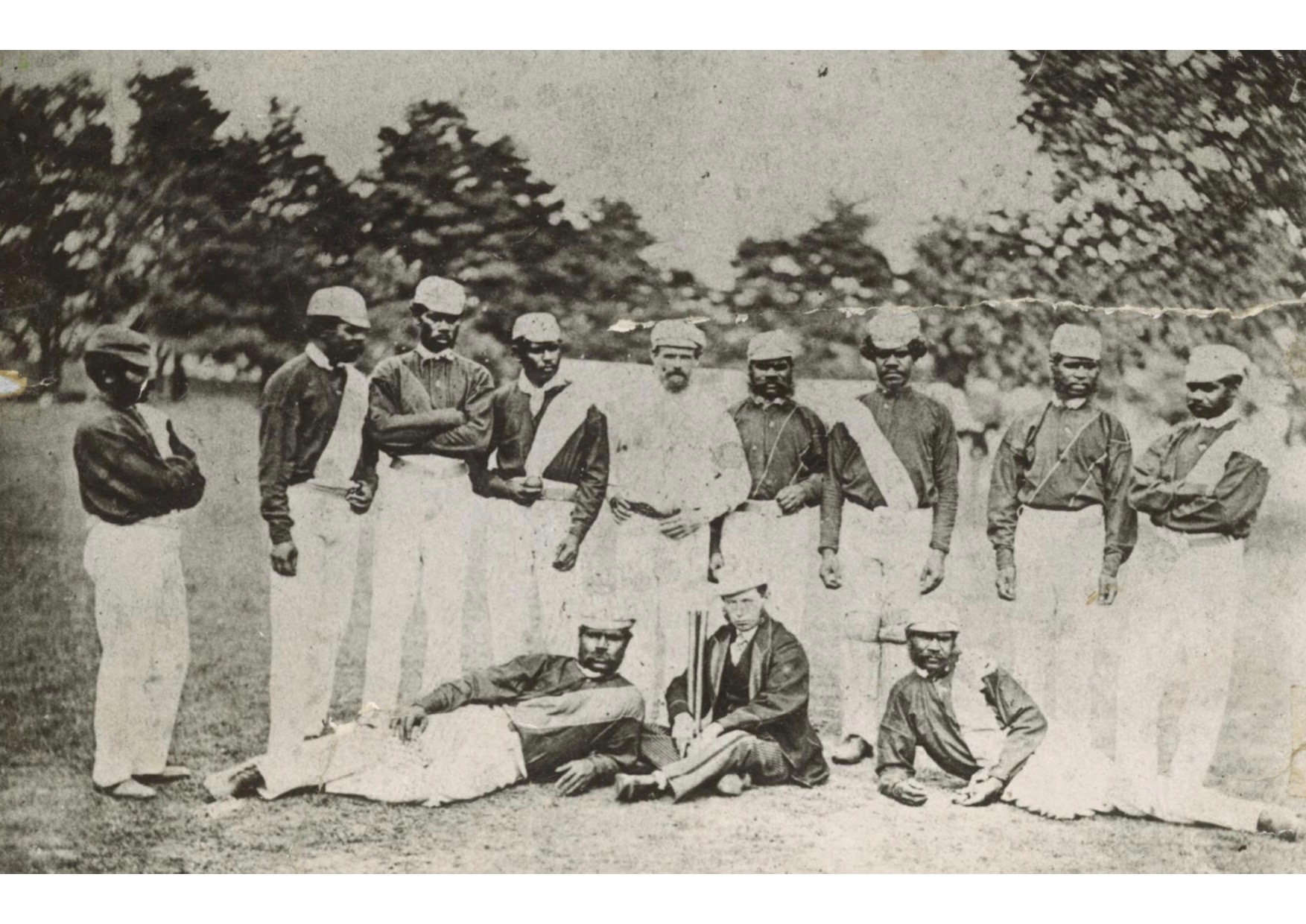
Australian Aboriginal cricket team, at Swansea in July 1868, including Charles Lawrence and William Shepherd (middle bottom).

William Charles Shepherd (9 August 1840 – 27 May 1919) was an English first-class cricketer, active 1864–68. He played for Surrey. He was born in Kennington and died in Tooting. In 1868 he played and toured with the Australian Aboriginal Cricket team and between 1872-1895 he was the Dulwich College cricket professional (coach and groundsman). He was a left-hand batsman and left-arm medium bowler. He was just 5 ft 5½ inches tall, and weighed a little over nine stone. As a left-arm, medium-pace bowler he had a unique delivery, “which gave the impression he was extracting the ball from his waistcoat pocket”. After leaving Surrey, he made his name as a coach, with engagements at Oxford and The Oval, before joining Dulwich.

== Surrey career ==
Batting averages
	Mat	Inns	NO	Runs	HS	Ave	100	50	Ct	St
First-class	13	17	6	56	18	5.09	0	0	8	0

Bowling averages
	Mat	Balls	Runs	Wkts	BBI	Ave	Econ	SR	5w	10
First-class	13	1733	709	38	8/49	18.65	2.45	45.6	2	0

== Australian Aboriginal Cricket Tour ==
He was referred to Charles Lawrence by Surrey Secretary William Burrup, at the annual dinner of the Surrey Club. Lawrence engaged Shepherd to travel with the Australian Aboriginal Cricket to tour England in 1868 as umpire, assistant and emergency player-captain. He represented the Aborigines on seven occasions, one as captain, with moderate success, scoring 66 runs at an average of 11 and taking 6 wickets at an average of 20.7.

== Dulwich College ==
The Alleynian (the Dulwich College Alumni Magazine) declared in 1879, “From the arrival of Shepherd dates a complete reform in the history of our cricket”. Shepherd drained, levelled and re-turfed the college playing fields, and devoted enormous energy to the cause of Dulwich cricket. PG Wodehouse's enthusiasm for Surrey cricket is likely to have been encouraged by Shepherd who was the Dulwich professional from 1872 to 1895. According to the 1881 Census, he lived in Ildersly Grove (Dulwich) with his wife Lucy and their four children, they were the only family in the street not to have live-in servants.

== Final years ==
Shepherd frequented the Oval in his declining years, retailing cricketing memories to bystanders. His nostalgic and not always accurate version of the Aboriginal tour was published in the 1919 edition of Ayres' Cricket Companion, the year of his death.

== After his death ==
As a result of his role in the Aboriginal tour of 1868, images of him appear as part of the team on a stamp released in 2018 by Australia Post celebrating 150 years since the 1868 tour, and the Mullagh Medal, which is awarded to the man of the match in the boxing day test match.
