= Johnny Mullagh =

Australian cricketer

Johnny Mullagh, Unaarrimin
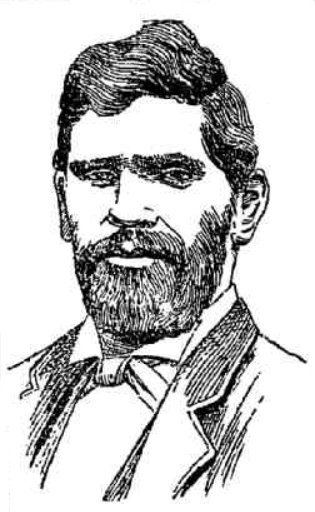

Cricket information
- Batting: Right-handed
- Bowling: Right-arm

Career statistics
Competition	First-class
Matches	1
Runs scored	40
Batting average	20.00
100s/50s	0/0
Top score	36
Balls bowled	12
Wickets	0
Bowling average	–
5 wickets in innings	–
10 wickets in match	–
Best bowling	–
Catches/stumpings	1/–
- Source: CricInfo, 6 March 2018

Johnny Mullagh (born Unaarrimin; 13 August 1841 – 14 August 1891) was an Australian cricketer from Victoria who was the leading player on the famous 1868 Aboriginal cricket tour of England. He was a skilful all-rounder, being a right-arm bowler and right-handed batsman. In December 2020, Mullagh was inducted into the Australian Cricket Hall of Fame. In 2026, at the National Aboriginal and Torres Strait Islander Sports Awards, he was named the 2026 National Trailblazer.

== Background ==
He was born Unaarrimin, a member of the Jardwadjali people, on Mullagh Station, about sixteen kilometres north of Harrow, Victoria. He was given the name "Mullagh" to identify him with his place of birth. He learned to play cricket at the Edgars' Pine Hills agricultural property in Harrow.

== Cricketing career ==
Mullagh played 47 matches on the 1868 England tour. Although not playing in any games on this tour considered to be first-class cricket, Mullagh scored 1,698 runs at an average of around 20, often on pitches that were considered treacherous. He also bowled 1,877 overs, 831 of which were maidens, and took 245 wickets at 10 apiece. Additionally, he would occasionally don wicketkeeping gloves, achieving four stumpings.

There was general discrimination against Indigenous peoples in Nineteenth-century Australia. Many of those chosen to tour England faced obscure futures and early deaths once the venture had concluded. One player, "King Cole", died on the trip; and, of those who returned, seven spent time on a reserve, two vanished, and the fate of two others is not clear from the surviving records.

Historian D. J. Mulvaney said of Mullagh, "Few contemporary cricketers better merited the title of all-rounder". Mullagh's performances were impressive enough for him to join the Melbourne Cricket Club (MCC) as a professional for part of the 1869–70 season. His appointment was terminated shortly afterwards, reportedly because of a severe illness when he was on the verge of inter-colonial selection.

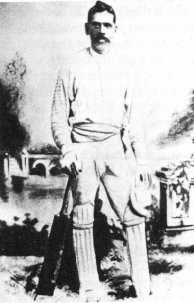
A Harrow portrait of Johnny Mullagh.

In 1870, Mullagh first played in a match for the Western District, appearing for Apsley against Harrow, but for the rest of his career he played mostly for Harrow. He liked to play an unorthodox shot similar to the 21st-century ramp shot: "Dropping on one knee to a fast rising ball, he would hold his bat over his shoulder and parallel to the ground. The ball would touch the blade, and shoot high over the wicket-keeper's head to the boundary."

Mullagh was both an independent person and a passionate advocate of Indigenous rights, refusing to dwell on state-controlled reserves. His political stance was revealed during a game at Apsley when, as the players went to lunch, a white participant asked: "What about the nigger?" The captain replied, "Let him have his dinner in the kitchen". Mullagh refused to eat in the kitchen, and he sat outside the hotel in protest.

Mullagh never appeared in an inter-colonial cricket match, although he did represent Victoria against a touring England side in 1879, top scoring with 36 in the second innings. He was then 38 years old and, instead of going in first-wicket-down as he did for his club, batted at nine and 10.

Maintaining his independence and dignity to the end, Mullagh spent his last days living in a rabbiter's shack. He continued to play cricket until a few months before his death at Pine Hills Station in 1891, one day after his 50th birthday. The Hamilton Spectator described him in his obituary as "the [W.G.] Grace of aboriginal cricketers", while another writer referred to Mullagh as "Victoria's premier batsman".

== Legacy ==
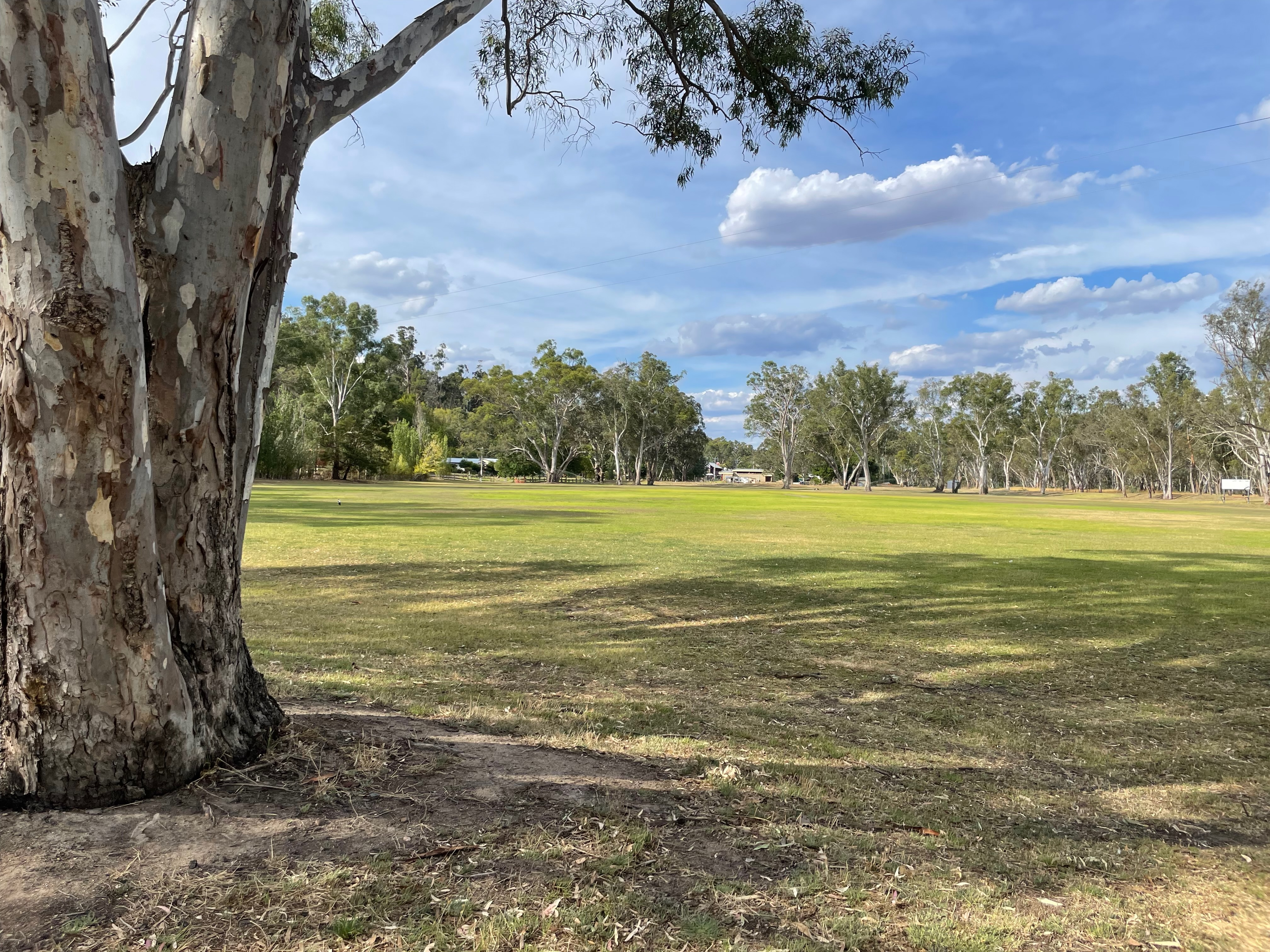
Johnny Mullagh Oval

A memorial has been built in Harrow to honour Mullagh, and the local sports ground is Johnny Mullagh Oval. A local indigenous tournament has been created, and the teams vie for the Johnny Mullagh Memorial Trophy.

In February 2012, the Premier of Victoria, Ted Baillieu, and the Minister for Aboriginal Affairs, Jeanette Powell, announced that Mullagh would be one of the 20 inaugural inductees to the Victorian Indigenous Honour Roll.

In December 2019, Cricket Australia revealed plans for the Johnny Mullagh Medal, to be awarded to the best player in the Boxing Day Test match from 2020. On 29 December 2020, Indian cricketer Ajinkya Rahane became the first recipient of the award. Following this, on 28 December 2021, another Aboriginal Australian, Scott Boland, received the award after taking 7 wickets on his test debut.

== See also ==
- Mullagh Medal
- List of Victoria first-class cricketers
- Twopenny – Aboriginal Australian who played for New South Wales against Victoria in 1870
- Jack Marsh – Aboriginal Australian who played for New South Wales from 1900 to 1902
- Albert Henry – Aboriginal Australian who played for Queensland from 1902 to 1905
- Eddie Gilbert – Aboriginal Australian who played for Queensland from 1930 to 1936
