= Albert Henry (cricketer) =

Australian cricketer

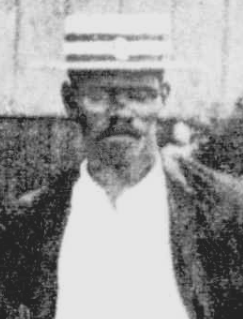

Personal information
- Full name: Albert Henry
- Born: c. 1880; Lowood, Queensland, Australia
- Died: 13 March 1909 (aged 28–29); Yarrabah, Queensland, Australia
- Nickname: Alec Henry
- Bowling: Right-arm fast
- Role: Bowler

Domestic team information
- Years: Team
- 1901/02–1904/05: Queensland
- First-class debut: 29 March 1902 Queensland v New South Wales
- Last First-class: 22 April 1905 Queensland v New South Wales

Career statistics
Competition	FC
Matches	7
Runs scored	36
Batting average	6.00
100s/50s	0/0
Top score	9
Balls bowled	1356
Wickets	21
Bowling average	32.04
5 wickets in innings	1
10 wickets in match	0
Best bowling	5/40
Catches/stumpings	3/–
- Source: CricketArchive, 14 August 2012

Albert Henry (also known as Alec Henry; c. 1880 – 13 March 1909) was one of the first Aboriginal Australians to play first-class cricket. He was a right handed fast bowler.

Henry was born in Lowood, Queensland. The Australian Dictionary of Biography suggests that his parents may be from the Jagera or Jukambe people. In around 1900, he moved to live at the Deebing Creek Mission near Ipswich, and played cricket for the Deebing Creek Aboriginal cricket team and then for Bundamba. Tall and thin, and a quick runner, he was an effective fast bowler.

He played in seven first-class matches for Queensland between March 1902 and April 1905, scoring 36 runs in 13 innings and taking 21 wickets at an average of 32.04.

He made his first-class debut in the match between Queensland and New South Wales in Brisbane in March 1902. He is thought to have been the first person of Aboriginal descent to play first-class cricket for Queensland. His first match for Queensland became the subject of much media attention in Australia, because it was the first time that two Aboriginal Australians had played in opposing teams at first-class level, with the New South Wales team including Jack Marsh, another fast bowler who had been accused of throwing. Henry was reputedly the fastest bowler in the world.

As part of the media promotion of the match-up between the pair, Henry was taken to Ipswich station to meet Marsh. Marsh was reported in the media as having said "Say old man, toss me up a soft one so I can get a smack at you". Marsh took 2/64 and 3/67 and Henry took 2/59 and 1/38 in a drawn match. Marsh and Henry each bowled three of their victims. They also dismissed one another once, each being bowled for nine in their respective team's first innings, and neither batted in their team's second innings, creating some symmetry in the scorecard. Nine was to remain Henry's highest first class batting score.

Henry also played against Marsh in his second first-class match, between Queensland and New South Wales at Brisbane in November 1902. Henry scored 2 and 4 not out, and took 0/39 and 5/40, his best single-innings bowling return, but New South Wales won by 77 runs.

Henry played against New South Wales at Sydney in December 1902, scoring 7 and 0 and taking 3/86 and 0/70 as New South Wales won by 2 wickets; against Victoria at Brisbane in January 1903, taking 3/76 and scoring 4 and 1 not out as Victoria won by an innings and 327 runs; and against the touring MCC side in November 1903, taking 2/60 – the wickets of Len Braund and Ted Arnold – and 0/21 and scoring 0 not out twice, as MCC won by 6 wickets. Braund was caught off the last ball of Henry's first over, and claimed it was the fastest bowling he had played against.

He played in his last first-class matches against New South Wales, at Sydney in December 1903, taking 0/57 and 4/49 and scoring 0 and 0*, with New South Wales winning by 2 runs, and at Brisbane in April 1905, taking 1/78 and New South Wales winning by an innings and 12 runs.

He moved to South Brisbane to play for a club team. After he was no-balled for throwing in a club match in 1904, he confronted the umpire Albert Crossart, saying that his good balls were no-balled, but the balls he threw deliberately were not. He was suspended and returned to Deebing Creek.

After disagreements with the government authorities at Deebing, he was moved to Barambah (now Cherbourg) and then Yarrabah in northern Queensland, where he died of tuberculosis before his 30th birthday.

== See also ==
- Twopenny – Aboriginal Australian who played for New South Wales against Victoria in 1870
- Johnny Mullagh – Aboriginal Australian who played for Victoria against the MCC in 1879
- Jack Marsh – Aboriginal Australian who played for New South Wales from 1900 to 1902
- Eddie Gilbert (cricketer) – Aboriginal Australian who played for Queensland from 1930 to 1936
