= Eddie Gilbert Medal =

Medal awarded by Indigenous Sport Queensland

Eddie Gilbert Medal is an award for Queensland's best indigenous sports person. Eddie Gilbert was a Queensland indigenous fast bowler in the 1930s. The award is organised by Indigenous Sport Queensland.

== List of winners ==
- 2007 - Johnathan Thurston (Rugby league)
- 2008 - Rohanee Cox (Basketball)
- 2009 - Not Held
- 2010 - Greg Inglis (Rugby league)
- 2011 - Not Held
- 2012 - Not Held
- 2013 - Not Held
- 2014 - Jesse Williams (Gridiron football)
- 2015 - Johnathan Thurston (Rugby league)
