= Charles Lawrence (cricketer) =

19th century English and Australian cricketer

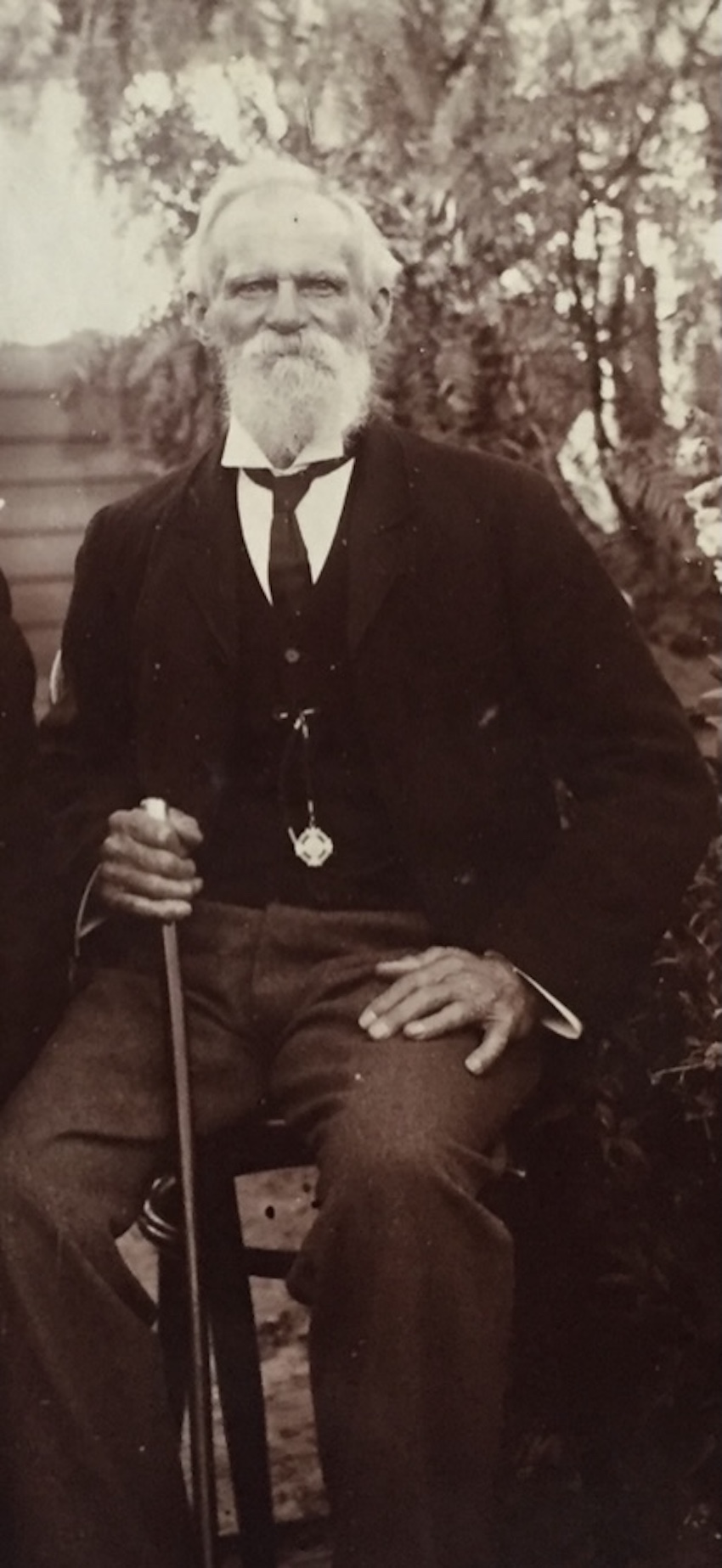

Cricket information
- Batting: Right-handed
- Bowling: Right-arm medium

Career statistics
Competition	First-class
Matches	9
Runs scored	227
Batting average	15.13
100s/50s	0/1
Top score	78
Balls bowled	822
Wickets	38
Bowling average	10.94
5 wickets in innings	4
10 wickets in match	2
Best bowling	7/25
Catches/stumpings	7/–
- Source: CricInfo, 28 June 2020

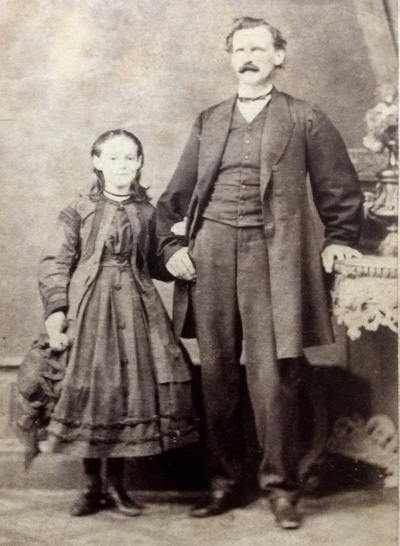
Charles Lawrence, studio portrait

Charles Lawrence (16 December 1828 – 20 December 1916) was an English cricketer, who played for Scotland, Ireland, Surrey and England.

After the touring with the England side of 1861–62, he settled in Australia, where he became captain-coach for New South Wales, and then captain-coach of the Aboriginal cricket team that toured England in 1868, the first ever tour of England by an Australian team.

== Career ==
=== British Isles ===
At the age of 17 Lawrence was engaged by the Perth Cricket Club in Scotland. In 1849 he played against the All English XI on tour in Scotland and he took all the English wickets for 24 runs. While in Scotland he also played for the Caledonian Cricket Club of Glasgow.

In 1851 Lawrence played for the Phoenix Cricket Club in Dublin, and in 1856 he formed and captained the United All Ireland XI, where he became friends with Tom Wills who played for that team. He played for Surrey between 1854 and 1857. He was selected for England to take part in one of the first international cricket tours, when the first All England XI, captained by H. H. Stephenson, toured Australia in 1861–62. The team travelled on the SS Great Britain. The players in this team were professionals, with each player paid £150 and guaranteed first class travelling expenses by the sponsors, Melbourne-based businessmen Spiers and Pond.

=== Australia ===
After the 1861–62 tour, Lawrence settled in Australia and was appointed Australia's first professional cricket coach for the Albert Cricket Club in Redfern, Sydney, to raise the standard of cricket in the state. Appointed captain of NSW, Lawrence took a match-winning 14 for 73 against Victoria in his first game, still a record. He played five times for New South Wales cricket team, and in 1863–64 took 4 for 42 and 6 for 48 for New South Wales against an England XI. Four of Australia’s first 15 Test cricketers would later have Albert CC pedigrees.

==== The 1868 Aboriginal XI ====
Lawrence first saw the indigenous team under the instruction of Tom Wills playing a match at the Albert Ground. On this occasion there was some contract disagreement between the failed sponsor Gurnett and Wills, and the players were left in Sydney. Lawrence was instructed to look after the Aboriginal players. At this time Lawrence was a publican and billeted the players in his hotel in Manly until he could arrange some cricket matches to raise money to return the players to the Western District of Victoria.

In 1868 Lawrence was contracted to coach and captain Australia's 'First Eleven' that toured England. He trained the players for two months at "Lake Wallace" in Edenhope in the Western District before selecting a side to tour England. The tour was financed by Sydney Lawyer George Graham along with his cousin George Smith (who had been Mayor of Sydney in 1859) and William Hayman; they all travelled to England for the tour.

After arriving in England, the Aboriginal XI proceeded to play 47 matches against county and local teams, between May and October 1868, including a match at Lord's. The Australian team won 14, drew 19 and lost 14 of their matches.

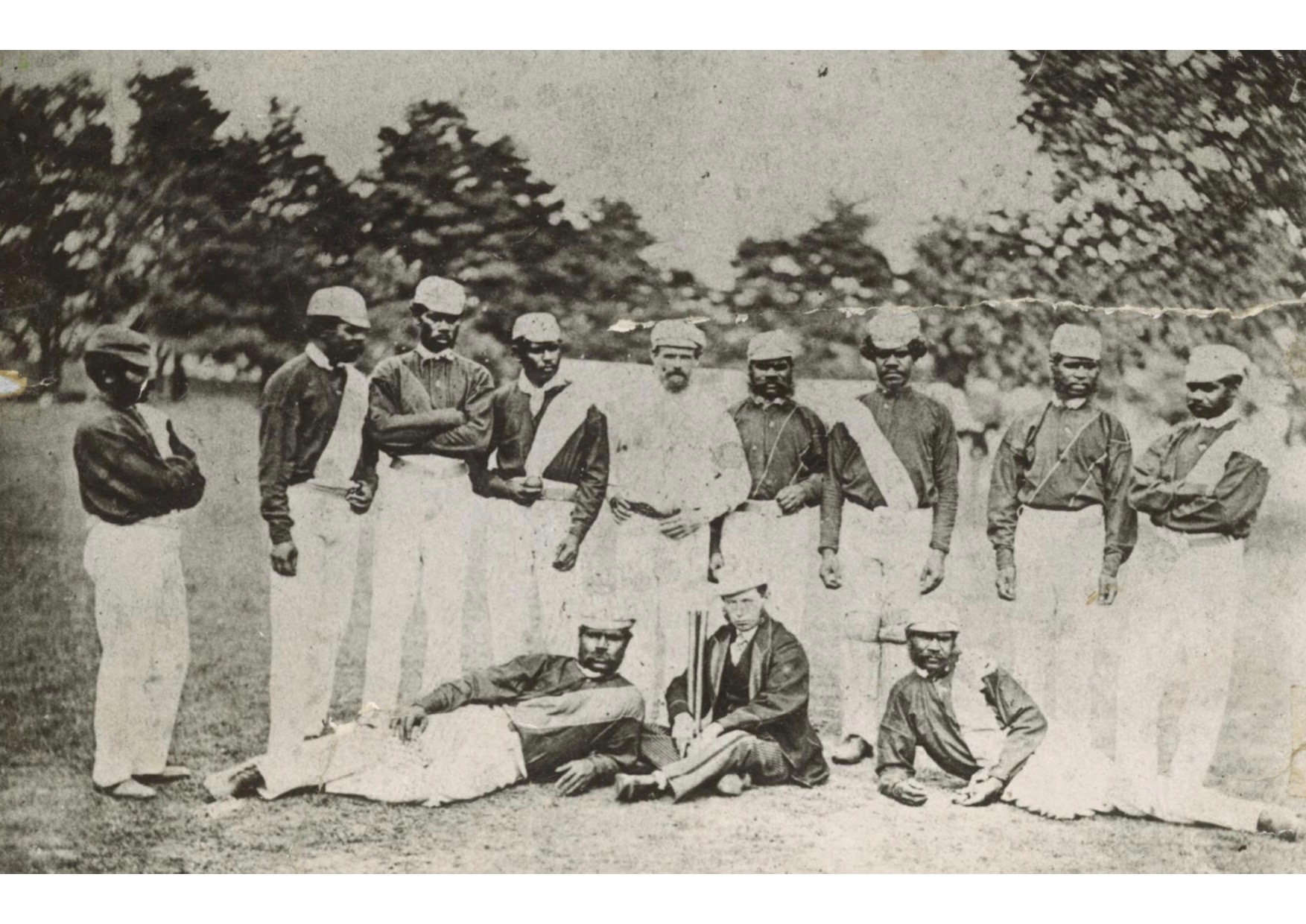
Aboriginal cricket team in England 1868 with Captain & Coach Charles Lawrence.

==== Subsequently ====
On his return to Sydney, the tour having lost £2,000, Lawrence sold the hotel, which fell into disrepair for some time, and moved up the coast to Newcastle where he worked for 24 years as an official for NSW Railways. Here, aged 55, he played for XVIII of Newcastle v Ivo Bligh's 1882/83 tourists.

Lawrence coached the juniors of the Melbourne Cricket Club from 1891 for eight years.

== Family life ==
When Lawrence sailed for Australia with Stephenson, he and his wife Anne had a son and two daughters, all Dublin-born. The family joined him in Australia, but his wife Anne died at their hotel in November 1866. Five days later, their Sydney-born daughter also died. His eldest daughter Anne may have accompanied the team to England in 1868, as she is recorded as being with them on the return voyage. In 1871, he married again, to Yorkshire-born Emmaretta Denison. They had three daughters, two of whom died in infancy. Emmaretta was to die before her husband, in hospital, in December 1915.

Lawrence died in December 1916. His death notice reads "The Father of Australian Cricket tours".

== Legacy ==
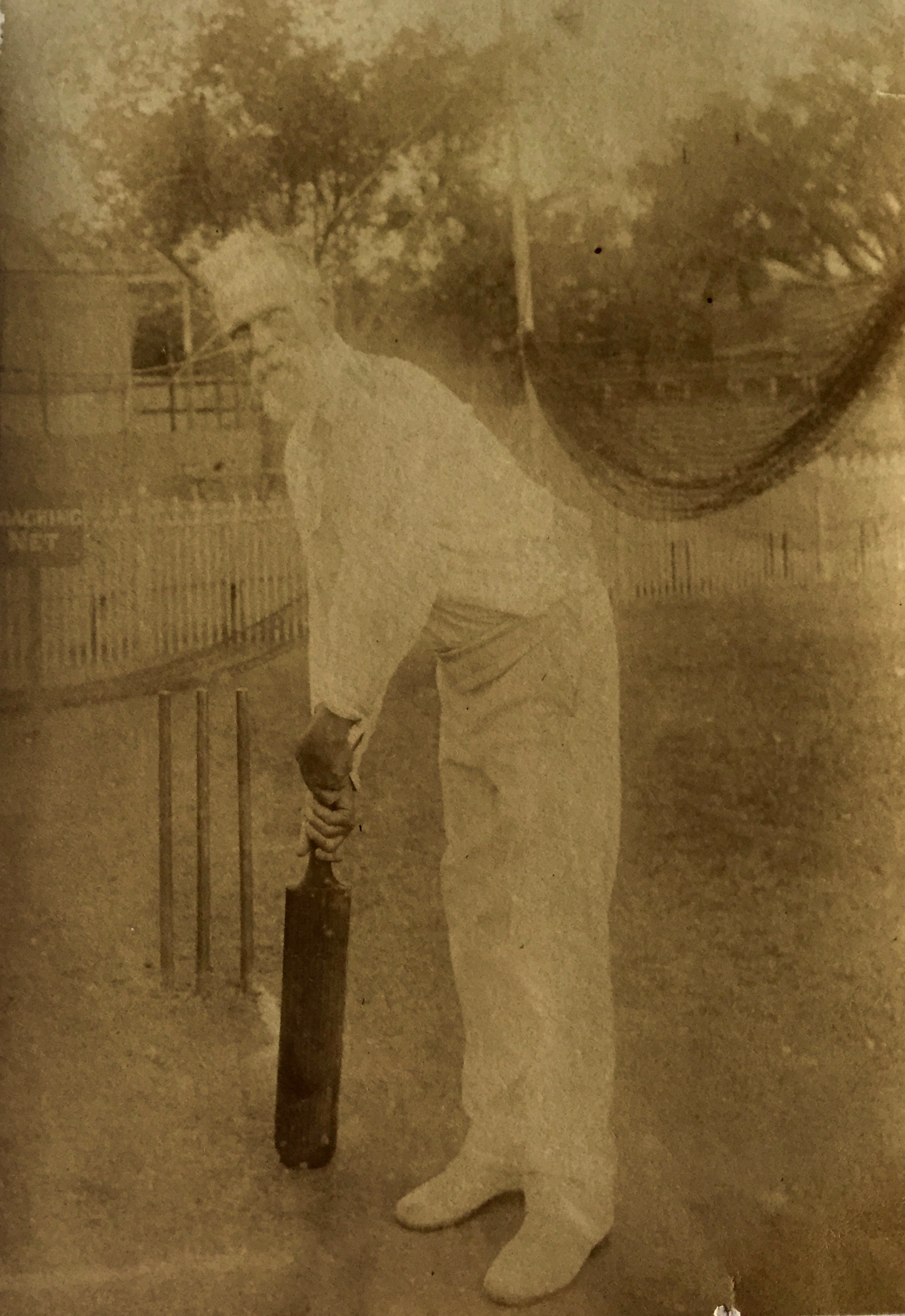
Charles Lawrence at Melbourne Cricket Club. 70 year old Coach.

- 1855, Founded and captained/coached the first All Ireland XI
- 1861, Selected for first England XI to tour Australia
- 1865, First professional cricket coach in N.S.W Australia
- 1868, Captain/Coach first Australian XI (Aboriginal) to tour England
- 1898, MCC coach at 70 years of age
- 2002, The Australian Cricket Hall of Fame recognized the 1868 touring team for their contribution to sport
- 2004, The 1868 team members were presented with cap numbers by Cricket Australia
- 2018, Australia Post released a stamp in 2018, celebrating 150 years since the 1868 tour
- 2019, Plaque unveiled on Charles Lawrence's grave at the Brighton Cemetery listing his cricket achievements

== See also ==
- List of New South Wales representative cricketers
