= Roy Lonergan =

Australian cricketer

Personal information
- Full name: Albert Roy Lonergan
- Born: 6 December 1909; Maylands, Western Australia
- Died: 22 October 1956 (aged 46); Adelaide, South Australia
- Source: ESPNcricinfo, 5 January 2017

Roy Lonergan (6 December 1909 – 22 October 1956) was an Australian cricketer. He played 43 first-class matches for New South Wales and South Australia between 1929/30 and 1935/36.
