= Australian Cricket Hall of Fame =

Australian museum component

Current logo for the Australian Cricket Hall of Fame

The Australian Cricket Hall of Fame is a part of the Australian Gallery of Sport and Olympic Museum in the Australian Sports Museum at the Melbourne Cricket Ground. This hall of fame commemorates the greatest Australian cricketers of all time, as the "selection philosophy for the hall of fame focuses on the players' status as sporting legends in addition to their outstanding statistical records." Inductees must be retired from international cricket for at least five years. The Australian Cricket Hall of Fame was an idea conceived by the Melbourne Cricket Club (MCC) to honour Australia's legendary cricketers. It was opened on 6 December 1996 by the then Prime Minister, John Howard.

The hall of fame opened with ten inaugural members, ranging from Fred Spofforth, a pace bowler who retired from Test cricket in 1887, to Dennis Lillee who played his last Test match in 1984. As of January 2023, the Australian Cricket Hall of Fame comprises 61 members. All twelve members of the Australian Cricket Board Team of the Century are included, six of them amongst the inaugural members. The vast majority are men; Belinda Clark was the first woman admitted to the hall when she was inducted in 2014 (three years after she was inducted into the ICC Cricket Hall of Fame). Five female Test captains have been admitted, along with 21 of their male counterparts. In December 2020, Johnny Mullagh became the first Indigenous Australian to be inducted into the hall of fame. Regarded as a standout player of the Aboriginal team which toured England in 1868, Mullagh is also the only member to have not played Test cricket for Australia.

The current selection committee comprises:

- Peter King – ACHOF chairman and current MCC committee member
- Belinda Clark – Former Test captain
- Mark Taylor – Former Test captain
- Paul Sheahan – Former Test batsman and former MCC President
- Todd Greenberg – Australian Cricketers' Association CEO
- Nick Hockley – Cricket Australia CEO
- Greg Baum and Ben Horne – Media representatives

New members are inducted at the annual Australian Cricket Awards night.

== Members of the Hall of Fame ==
Key

General

- Inducted – Year of induction
- Career – Test career span
- Mat – Number of matches played
- ‡ – member of the Australian Cricket Board Team of the Century
- ^ – former captain of the Australian Test team or women's Test team
- $ – member of the ICC Cricket Hall of Fame

Batting

- Inn – Number of innings batted
- NO – Number of not out innings
- Runs – Runs scored in career
- HS – Highest score
- Avg – Runs scored per dismissal
- * – Batsman remained not out

Bowling

- Balls – Balls bowled in career
- Mdn – Maiden overs bowled in career
- Runs – Runs conceded in career
- Wkt – Wickets taken in career
- Best – Best bowling in an innings
- Avg – Average runs per wicket

Fielding

- Ca – Catches taken
- St – Stumpings taken

Australian Cricket Hall of Fame members and their Test cricket statistics
Name	Image	Inducted	Career	Mat	Batting					Bowling						Fielding		Ref(s)
Name	Image	Inducted	Career	Mat	Inn	NO	Runs	HS	Avg	Balls	Mdn	Runs	Wkts	Best	Avg	Ca	St	Ref(s)
Jack Blackham ^	Jack Blackham c.1885	1996	1877–1894	35	62	11	800	74	15.68	–	–	–	–	–	–	37	24	
Fred Spofforth $	Fred Spofforth	1996	1877–1887	18	29	6	217	50	9.43	4,185	416	1,731	94	7/44	18.41	11	–	
Victor Trumper $	Victor Trumper	1996	1899–1912	48	89	8	3,163	214*	39.04	546	20	317	8	3/60	39.62	31	–	
Clarrie Grimmett $	Clarrie Grimmett in 1932	1996	1925–1936	37	50	10	557	50	13.92	14,513	736	5,231	216	7/40	24.21	17	–	
Bill Ponsford ‡	Bill Ponsford in 1930	1996	1924–1934	29	48	4	2,122	266	48.22	–	–	–	–	–	–	21	–	
Don Bradman ‡^$	Don Bradman during his playing career	1996	1928–1948	52	80	10	6,996	334	99.94	160	3	72	2	1/8	36.00	32	–	
Bill O'Reilly ‡$	Bill O'Reilly in 1934	1996	1932–1946	27	39	7	410	56*	12.81	10,024	585	3,254	144	7/54	22.59	7	–	
Keith Miller ‡$	Keith Miller in 1951	1996	1946–1956	55	87	7	2,958	147	36.97	10,461	337	3,906	170	7/60	22.97	38	–	
Ray Lindwall ‡^$	Ray Lindwall circa 1940s	1996	1946–1960	61	84	13	1,502	118	21.15	13,650	419	5,251	228	7/38	23.03	26	–	
Dennis Lillee ‡$	Dennis Lillee in 2012	1996	1971–1984	70	90	24	905	73*	13.71	18,467	652	8,493	355	7/83	23.92	23	–	
Warwick Armstrong ^	Warwick Armstrong during his playing career	2000	1902–1921	50	84	10	2,863	159*	38.68	8,022	407	2,923	87	6/35	33.59	44	–	
Neil Harvey ‡^$		2000	1948–1963	79	137	10	6,149	205	48.41	414	23	120	3	1/8	40.00	64	–	
Allan Border ‡^$	Allan Border in 1988	2000	1978–1994	156	265	44	11,174	205	50.56	4,009	197	1,525	39	7/46	39.10	156	–	
Bill Woodfull ^	Bill Woodfull during his playing career	2001	1926–1934	35	54	4	2,300	161	46.00	–	–	–	–	–	–	7	–	
Arthur Morris ‡^$	Arthur Morris in 1939	2001	1946–1955	46	79	3	3,533	206	46.48	111	1	50	2	1/5	25.00	15	–	
Greg Chappell ‡^$	–	2002	1970–1984	87	151	19	7,110	247*	53.86	5,327	208	1,913	47	5/61	40.70	122	–	
Stan McCabe	Stan McCabe	2002	1930–1938	39	62	5	2,748	232	48.21	3,746	127	1,543	36	4/13	42.86	41	–	
Ian Chappell ^$	Ian Chappell during his playing career	2003	1964–1980	75	136	10	5,345	196	42.42	2,873	87	1,316	20	2/21	65.80	105	–	
Lindsay Hassett ^	Lindsay Hassett	2003	1938–1953	43	69	3	3,073	198*	46.56	111	2	78	–	–	–	30	–	
Hugh Trumble ^	Hugh Trumble	2004	1890–1904	32	57	14	851	70	19.79	8,099	452	3,072	141	8/65	21.78	45	–	
Alan Davidson $	Alan Keith Davidson in 2014	2004	1953–1963	44	61	7	1,328	80	24.59	11,587	431	3,819	186	7/93	20.53	42	–	
Clem Hill ^	Clem Hill during his playing career	2005	1896–1912	49	89	2	3,412	191	39.21	–	–	–	–	–	–	33	–	
Rod Marsh $	–	2005	1970–1984	96	150	13	3,633	132	26.51	72	1	54	–	–	–	343	12	
Bob Simpson ^$	Bob Simpson in 1998	2006	1957–1978	62	111	7	4,869	311	46.81	6,881	253	3,001	71	5/57	42.27	110	–	
Monty Noble ^	Monty Noble in 1905	2006	1898–1909	42	73	7	1,997	133	30.25	7,159	361	3,025	121	7/17	25.00	26	–	
Charlie Macartney	Charlie Macartney circa 1920s	2007	1907–1926	35	55	4	2,131	170	41.78	3,561	177	1,240	45	7/58	27.55	17	–	
Richie Benaud ^$	Richie Benaud in 1956	2007	1952–1964	63	97	7	2,201	122	24.45	19,108	805	6,704	248	7/72	27.03	65	–	
George Giffen ^	George Giffen in 1895	2008	1881–1896	31	53	0	1,238	161	23.35	6,391	434	2,791	103	7/117	27.09	24	–	
Ian Healy ‡	Ian Healy in 2009	2008	1988–1999	119	182	23	4,356	161*	27.39	–	–	–	–	–	–	366	29	
Steve Waugh ^$	Steve Waugh in 2002	2009	1985–2004	168	260	46	10,927	200	51.06	7,805	332	3,445	92	5/28	37.44	112	–	
Bill Lawry ^	–	2010	1961–1971	67	123	12	5,234	210	47.15	14	1	6	0	0/0	–	30	–	
Graham McKenzie	–	2010	1961–1971	60	89	12	945	76	12.27	17,681	547	7,328	246	8/71	29.78	34	–	
Mark Taylor ^	Mark Taylor in 2014	2011	1989–1999	104	186	13	7,525	334*	43.49	42	1	26	1	1/11	26.00	157	–	
Doug Walters		2011	1965–1981	74	125	14	5,357	250	48.26	3,295	79	1,425	49	5/66	29.08	43	–	
Shane Warne ‡$	Shane Warne in 2011	2012	1992–2007	145	199	17	3,154	99	17.32	40,705	1,761	17,995	708	8/71	25.41	125	–	
Glenn McGrath $	Glenn McGrath in 2011	2013	1993–2007	124	138	51	641	61	7.36	29,248	1,471	12,186	563	8/24	21.64	38	–	
Charles Turner	Charles Turner	2013	1887–1895	17	35	4	323	29	11.53	5,179	457	1,670	101	7/43	16.53	8	–	
Belinda Clark ^$	–	2014	1991–2005	15	25	5	919	136	45.95	78	5	28	1	1/10	28.00	4	–	
Mark Waugh	Mark Waugh in 2011	2014	1991–2002	128	209	17	8,029	153*	41.81	4,853	171	2,429	59	5/40	41.16	181	–	
Jack Ryder ^	Jack Ryder	2015	1920–1929	20	32	5	1,394	201*	51.62	1,897	71	743	17	2/20	43.70	17	–	
Adam Gilchrist ^$	Adam Gilchrist in 2010	2015	1999–2008	96	137	20	5,570	204*	47.60	–	–	–	–	–	–	379	37	
Wally Grout		2016	1957–1966	51	67	8	890	74	15.08	–	–	–	–	–	–	163	24	
Jeff Thomson	–	2016	1972–1985	51	73	20	679	49	12.81	10,535	300	5,601	200	6/46	28.00	20	–	
David Boon	David Boon in 2006	2017	1984–1996	107	190	20	7,422	200	43.65	36	3	14	0	0/0	–	99	–	
Matthew Hayden	Matthew Hayden in 2012	2017	1994–2009	103	184	14	8,625	380	50.73	54	0	40	0	0/7	128.00	128	–	
Betty Wilson $	Betty Wilson in 1951	2017	1948–1958	11	16	1	862	127	57.46	2,885	172	803	68	7/7	11.80	10	–	
Norm O'Neill	–	2018	1958–1965	42	69	8	2,779	181	45.55	1,392	48	667	17	4/41	39.23	21	–	
Ricky Ponting ^$	Ricky Ponting in 2015	2018	1995–2012	168	287	29	13,378	257	51.85	587	24	276	5	1/0	55.20	196	–	
Karen Rolton ^$	Karen Rolton in 2009	2018	1995–2009	14	22	4	1,002	209*	55.66	1,104	79	327	14	2/6	23.35	9	–	
Cathryn Fitzpatrick $	–	2019	1991–2006	13	9	0	152	53	16.88	3,603		1,147	60	5/14	19.11	5	–	
Dean Jones	–	2019	1984–1994	52	89	11	3,631	216	46.55	198		64	1	1/5	64.00	34	–	
Billy Murdoch	Billy Murdoch sitting holding a bat	2019	1875–1904	19	34	5	908	211	31.31	–	–	–	–	–	–	14	1	
Sharon Tredrea ^	–	2020	1975–1984	10	14	3	346	63	31.45	2,455	–	784	30	4/22	26.13	8	–	
Craig McDermott		2020	1984–1996	71	90	13	940	42*	12.20	16,586	579	8,332	291	8/97	28.63	19	–	
Johnny Mullagh		2020	–	–	–	–	–	–	–	–	–	–	–	–	–	–	–	
Merv Hughes		2021	1985–1994	53	70	8	1,032	72*	16.64	12,285	499	6,017	212	8/87	28.38	23	–	
Lisa Sthalekar $		2021	2003–2011	8	15	2	416	120*	32.00	1,745	117	482	23	5/30	20.95	3	–	
Justin Langer		2022	1993–2007	105	182	12	7,696	250	45.27	6	0	3	0	0/3	–	73	–	
Raelee Thompson ^	–	2022	1972–1985	16	22	8	162	25	11.57	4,304	276	1,040	57	8/31	18.24	12	–	
Margaret Jennings ^	–	2023	1972–1977	8	12	0	341	104	28.41	–	–	–	–	–	–	14	10	
Ian Redpath	–	2023	1964–1976	66	120	11	4,737	171	43.45	64	2	41	0	0/0	–	83	–	
Michael Hussey		2024	2005–2013	79	137	16	6235	195	51.52	588	11	306	7	1/0	43.71	85	0	
Lyn Larsen	–	2024	1984–1992	15	14	4	410	86	41.00	2124	169	487	26	4/33	18.73	11	0	
Michael Clarke^		2025	2004–2015	115	198	22	8643	329*	49.10	2435	62	1184	31	6/9	38.19	134	0	
Michael Bevan	–	2025	1994–1998	18	30	3	785	91	29.07	1285	30	703	29	6/82	24.24	8	0	
Christina Matthews	–	2025	1984–1995	20	22	5	180	34	10.58	6	0	4	0	0/4	4.00	46	12	
Brett Lee		2025	1999–2008	76	90	18	1,451	64	20.15	16,531	547	9554	310	5/30	30.81	23	0	
Alex Blackwell ^		2026	2003–2017	12	22	2	444	74	22.20	72	6	10	0	–	–	6	–	

== See also ==
- Allan Border Medal
- Australia national cricket team
- Australia women's national cricket team
- Cricket Australia
