= Peter King (cricketer) =

Australian cricketer (born 1959)

Personal information
- Born: 24 May 1959 (age 67); Melbourne, Australia

Domestic team information
- Years: Team
- 1982–1985: Victoria
- Source: Cricinfo, 6 December 2015

Peter King (born 24 May 1959) is an Australian former cricketer. He played seven first-class cricket matches for Victoria between 1982 and 1985.

== See also ==
- List of Victoria first-class cricketers
