= Jack Marsh =

Australian cricketer (c1874–1916)

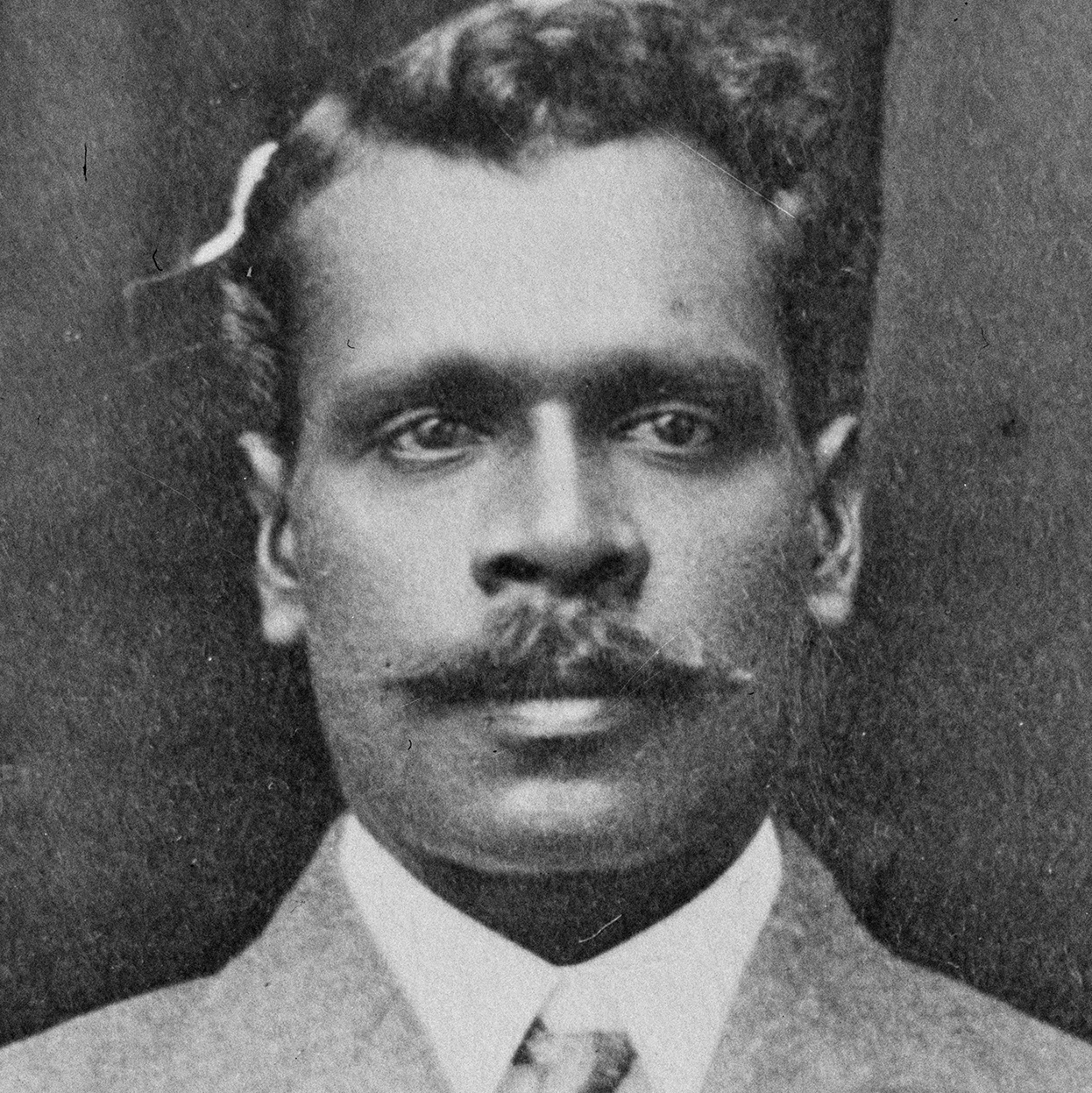

Personal information
- Full name: Jack Marsh
- Born: c. 1874; Yulgilbar, New South Wales
- Died: 25 May 1916 (aged 41–42); Orange, New South Wales
- Height: 5 ft 7 in (1.70 m)
- Batting: Right-handed
- Bowling: Right-arm fast
- Role: Fast bowler

Domestic team information
- Years: Team
- 1900–1903: New South Wales

Career statistics
Competition	First-class
Matches	6
Runs scored	40
Batting average	5.00
100s/50s	0/0
Top score	9*
Balls bowled	1,370
Wickets	34
Bowling average	21.47
5 wickets in innings	3
10 wickets in match	1
Best bowling	5/34
Catches/stumpings	2/0
- Source: CricketArchive, 1 December 2011

Jack Marsh (c. 1874 – 25 May 1916) was an Australian first-class cricketer of Australian Aboriginal descent who represented New South Wales in six matches from 1900–01 to 1902–03. A right-arm fast bowler of extreme pace, Marsh had high athletic qualities and was regarded as one of the outstanding talents of his era. His career was curtailed by continual controversy surrounding the legality of his bowling action; he was no-balled multiple times for throwing. As a result of the debate over the legitimacy of his action, Marsh never established himself at first-class level and was overlooked for national selection. In contemporary discourse, Marsh's lack of opportunities has often been attributed to racial discrimination.

Born into the Bundjalung people at Yulgilbar on the Clarence River in northern New South Wales, Marsh first made an impression as a professional runner, travelling to Sydney and then competing interstate, winning races as a sprinter and a hurdler. While in Sydney, Marsh began competing in the local club cricket competition and his action quickly came under scrutiny. He was first no-balled for throwing in 1897, but it was not until 1900 that he came to prominence in a trial match against the New South Wales state team. Marsh dismissed leading Test cricketers Victor Trumper and Monty Noble, but was called for throwing. Marsh vowed to prove the legitimacy of his action by bowling with his arm encased in splints, which prompted the umpire to resign in humiliation. Having topped the bowling averages in the local competition, Marsh was selected to make his debut in the Sheffield Shield. He made an immediate impression and led the first-class bowling averages for the season after three matches. He was no-balled in his second match by Bob Crockett, but things came to a head in his fourth match when the same umpire no-balled him seventeen times, leading to angry crowd demonstrations. The cricket community was divided on whether Marsh's action was fair and various theories were propounded, which sought to show a motive for foul play against Marsh. The most popular of these theories was that Marsh was scapegoated in a campaign against throwing and was a soft target because of his race.

Marsh only played in two more first-class matches, which came in the two seasons following his no-balling. In a later season, the touring England cricket team objected to his selection in an opposition team. There were calls for Marsh to be selected for Australia, but Noble, the New South Wales selector, refused to select him, citing his controversial action. In later years, Marsh turned to alcohol and was briefly jailed for assault. He was killed in a brawl outside a pub; two men were charged with manslaughter but were acquitted.

== Early years ==
Marsh was born into the Bundjalung people at Yulgilbar, which sits on the Clarence River in northern New South Wales. His surname is believed to have possibly derived from that of Francis Henry Marsh, whose property Camira was separated from Yulgilbar by the Richmond Range. Details of Marsh's itinerant pre-cricket life are scarce, because Aboriginal Australians were not on the electoral roll and Marsh had no written correspondence with others because he was illiterate.

Marsh made his first impression in the sporting arena as a professional runner, following his brother Larry to the Sydney athletics tracks in 1893. A sprinter and hurdler, Marsh had several wins in notable races. He was known for his rapid acceleration, which accounted for him being particularly strong over 75 yd. Aside from his victories in New South Wales, he travelled to race in Queensland and Victoria. As with some other Indigenous runners, Marsh was exploited by his trainer and was suspended for "running stiff" in Sydney in 1895. A more recent study by Max Bonnell has come to the conclusion that Marsh was a world-class sprinter. He found that The Referee, the leading sports publication in Australia at the time, reported that Marsh had covered 100 yd in 9.8 s, which was equal to the amateur world record set by American John Owen in 1890. Marsh had also posted a time of 9.9 s in the previous year. Eight years later a publication briefly noted that Marsh's time was an Australian record.

Marsh also gained prominence in the inner-southern Sydney suburb of La Perouse, which had a large Indigenous population, by demonstrating his boomerang skills. Marsh, while throwing boomerangs, was spotted by cricket officials and he was persuaded to take up the sport.

== Club cricket ==
Marsh began playing cricket in a competition based around Moore Park, near central Sydney, representing South Sydney. Marsh's career was surrounded by controversy from the outset. In November 1897, he was no-balled for throwing by William Curran in a match against Paddington. Following its merger with South Sydney, Marsh played for Sydney Cricket Club. Marsh's second no-ball incident at club level came when he played for a Colts XV against the New South Wales state team in a trial match in November 1900, before the start of the 1900–01 Sheffield Shield season. Curran called him on the first day of the match. Marsh had an eventful day, bowling Test batsmen Victor Trumper, Frank Iredale and future Test player Bert Hopkins. Trumper was widely regarded as the finest batsman of his era, which was regarded as the "golden age" of cricket, and he was seen as one of the most stylish batsmen of all time. Marsh also collected the wickets of Test batsmen and future Australian captains Monty Noble and Syd Gregory.

The calls of throwing so infuriated Marsh that at the end of the day's play, he announced that he would wear splints when he was bowling the next day. Marsh took this action to ensure that his elbow was kept straight and to demonstrate that he could bowl fast without throwing. Marsh had previously performed such an exhibition to ground members and the requisite splints and bandages were acquired from the nearby St. Vincent's Hospital, in order to bind his bowling arm. The hospital provided a medical certificate stating that Marsh could not move his elbow while encased in the splints. Marsh was proactive in attempting to defend the legitimacy of his bowling action. Marsh's intentions were published in the Sydney Morning Herald and Curran was made aware that Marsh would seek to challenge him.

Marsh and his club sought a speedy resolution to the problem because Sheffield Shield matches were due to begin in a matter of weeks. They perceived a danger that other umpires in the Sydney competition would follow Curran's lead and call Marsh, effectively outlawing him, resulting in the loss of the club's leading strike bowler. By wearing the splints, Marsh showed his belief that Curran would call him on the second day. This never happened, because Curran withdrew from his position by the luncheon adjournment on the second day, believing that he had been humiliated. Curran's resignation was widely criticised by the media and he was reprimanded by the First Grade Committee for his action. Bowling "as fast as ever", Marsh went on to finish with 6/125 from 33 overs as New South Wales were bowled out for 320.

== First-class debut ==
Marsh made his first-class debut when he was selected for the New South Wales team to play South Australia at the Adelaide Oval in December 1900, just a month after he was no-balled for throwing. The selection indicated that the state selectors were prepared to overrule Curran's judgment. In a high scoring match, Marsh was the most successful of the New South Wales bowlers, taking five wickets for the loss of 181 runs (5/181). Clem Hill scored 365 not out, which remains the highest individual score compiled at the Adelaide Oval in a Sheffield Shield match. At the time, South Australia's total of 575 was the highest ever score against New South Wales in the competition. Marsh took two early wickets to have South Australia 2/43 before Hill amassed his triple-century. He returned to take three of the last four wickets, displaying an ability to break through the defences of batsmen—all of his wickets were bowled.

A week later, Marsh's action was again under scrutiny when he played his second shield match against Victoria in Melbourne. While Richard Callaway—the New South Wales umpire officiating the match—was satisfied with Marsh's bowling action, his Victorian counterpart Bob Crockett was concerned with the twisting of the bowler's wrist. Crockett no-balled Marsh three times in the match, but was reluctant to elucidate on the reasons for his call. Marsh took 3/39 and 3/51 respectively, dismissing Test batsmen Peter McAlister, Warwick Armstrong, Jack Worrall and Frank Laver. Marsh bowled three of his victims.

According to cricket historian Bernard Whimpress, the early signs of a conspiracy against Marsh were raised by a journalist from The Age of Melbourne by the name of Old Boy. The journalist set a possible agenda by raising a question about Marsh to Crockett on the day before the bowler was called, possibly predisposing the umpire to take action. If Old Boy could be relied on, then observers suspected that Marsh's faster and slower ball were dubious. The reporter did not specify which ball he questioned, except to say that one ball per over was doubtful. The events in Australia occurred against a backdrop of a throwing frenzy in England. A fortnight earlier, the captains of the English county teams had drawn up a list of prohibited bowlers. In Australia, Jim Phillips had set the tone by no-balling Australian Test bowler Ernie Jones. The events in England were seen as a catalyst for a clean-up campaign against dubious bowling actions. Historians regarded Marsh as a prime target due to his Indigenous heritage and his supple wrist action.

Marsh's third Sheffield Shield match was the return fixture against South Australia in January 1901 at the Sydney Cricket Ground (SCG); New South Wales reversed the result of the corresponding match three weeks earlier. South Australia batted first and were bowled out for 157, with Marsh taking the leading figures of 5/34. These included the prize wickets of Hill and George Giffen, Test players who went on to be inducted into the Australian Cricket Hall of Fame. New South Wales then piled on 918 before completing an innings victory by bowling the visitors out for 156 in the second innings. The margin of an innings and 605 runs set a new record for the largest victory in first-class history. Marsh took 5/59 and did the bulk of the damage, removing five of South Australia's top six specialist batsmen, at one stage reducing the visitors to 6/114. Marsh bowled six of his opponents and was not questioned by either umpire. At this point, Marsh led the first-class averages in bowling, with 21 wickets at a bowling average of 17.38 in three matches. The match was Marsh's career high point; it was to be the only ten-wicket match of his brief career.

The controversy over Marsh's bowling action came to a head in the return match against Victoria at the SCG. The fixture had been slated for the Australia Day weekend but it was postponed by a week when Queen Victoria died. By the time the match was under way, public interest had started to wane. Some three decades later, J. C. Davis reflected on the match, noting that it stirred many memories, "some fragrant and some rather unpleasant". The unsavoury incident that he alluded to was Crockett's continual no-balling of Marsh for throwing.

New South Wales batted first and were bowled out on the first afternoon for 170. When the Victorians began their response, Crockett called Marsh for throwing three times in his first over, provoking rowdy responses from the spectators. The Sydney Mail said the crowd reaction was "a lot of abuse and unfair criticism" of Crockett. He was no-balled a further two times in his second over and five of Victoria's first nine runs were extras. Despite this, Victoria started poorly, losing five wickets by the time it reached 50 runs. Of the five wickets to fall, Marsh bowled future Test captain Armstrong and McAlister. The crowd showed its sympathy for Marsh when he rattled Armstrong's stumps; they cheered him loudly and verbally attacked Crockett. Marsh was called a total of 17 times during the innings, the most in a single first-class innings in Australia. The calls produced angry reactions from the spectators on the hill of the Sydney Cricket Ground, who jeered "Crock! Crock! Crock!", regarding the umpire—not the bowler's arm—as being crooked. Marsh went on to take 2/68. At one point Marsh lost his temper and deliberately threw three consecutive balls. Despite the repeated calls, the captain Syd Gregory kept Marsh bowling from Crockett's end—who was suspected of being biased towards his own state—rather than allowing Marsh to be examined by Crockett's partner.

== Reaction to Crockett ==
Crockett's calls provoked a varied response from the media, which often ran counter to their state allegiances. The New South Wales journalist Davis felt that Marsh's deliberate throws raised "uncertainty", while the Australasian's cricket writer Tom Horan—a Victorian who went by the pen name Felix—felt that Marsh was a soft target for Crockett, whom he regarded as a suspicious character. Curran's previous calling of Marsh in the Sydney competition had strengthened Crockett's position away from his parochial state base. The Victorian umpire was regarded as a tough-minded umpire, much like Jim Phillips, who had triggered the current round of throwing calls in Australian cricket. Crockett was commended for his willingness to call Marsh in the face of public anger and for doing what others would not. When Marsh bowled from the other end in the second innings of the match, his action was deemed by Crockett's umpiring partner Sammy Jones to be fair. By this time, Marsh's confidence was low. He took his worst ever first-class figures of 1/105 as New South Wales lost by one wicket. His only wicket was Test player Charlie McLeod, bowled for six.

Whimpress tabled various hypotheses for Crockett's actions. At the time, Crockett was 37 years old and was ready to emerge from the shadow of Phillips, the eminent Australian umpire of the time. When Crockett called Marsh, it was his 29th match as a first-class umpire and the no-balling was seen in some quarters as a signal that he felt ready to officiate in Test matches. A cynical view of Crockett's calls held that if throwing was to be eradicated then the umpire was going to choose a soft target. This theory ruled out the calling of a fellow Victorian, his state of origin. The same line of reasoning concluded that a New South Welshman would be called, and likely not a high-profile Test player like Noble or Jack Saunders. Those who adhered to this hypothesis believed that it would be easier for Crockett to target someone who had a previous stigma of throwing and that Marsh—an Aboriginal Australian who led the bowling averages with 21 wickets at 17.38—was an ideal target.

At the time, the alteration to the no-ball law made by the Marylebone Cricket Club (MCC) in 1899 was yet to be implemented in Australian first-class cricket. This change allowed the umpire to call a throw from either end, whereas the law previously barred the umpire at square leg from doing so. The non-implementation of the law diluted the power of Australian umpires, since the bowler could be switched to the other end and made immune from being called by the first umpire. As a result, Gregory's unwillingness to switch Marsh to the opposite end surprised cricket observers. Australian administrators had been under pressure from England to crack down on dubious bowling actions. English captain Archie MacLaren had asserted that "If Australia expects an English team next September they will have to play according to the new reading of the law at home". It was speculated that because Crockett was a lifelong employee of the Melbourne Cricket Club, which organised and sponsored English tours to Australia, he was under pressure to no-ball bowlers in order to curry favour with English administrators.

== Incidents against England ==
The controversy over Marsh's bowling action again reared its head during the 1901–02 season, when MacLaren led his English tourists to Australia. The English played in a match at Bathurst where Marsh was selected, but MacLaren refused to play against him. Noble, who selected the New South Wales teams, used the complaints about Marsh to ignore growing calls to have the bowler selected for New South Wales and Australia. Without state backing, the remainder of Australia's selectors were happy to rely on Noble's state-level veto to ignore Marsh. Marsh's only first-class match of the season was against Queensland in Brisbane. At the time, Queensland was not yet in the Sheffield Shield, so it was a one-off match. The match was the subject of much media attention because it was the first time that two Aboriginal Australians had played in opposing teams at first-class level. Queensland's Indigenous player was Alec Henry, another fast bowler who had been accused of throwing. The New South Wales team travelled north to the match by train, making a stop at Ipswich. As part of the media promotion of the match-up between the pair, Henry was taken to Ipswich station to meet Marsh. Marsh was reported in the media as having said "Say old man, toss me up a soft one so I can get a smack at you". Marsh took 2/64 and 3/67 in a drawn match, and bowled three of his victims, who were unable to cope with his pace. Marsh and Henry dismissed one another, each being bowled for nine to create a symmetry in the scorecard.

Marsh was again overlooked for selection during the 1902–03 Sheffield Shield season. He played his only first-class match of the season against Queensland, in another one-off match. In the last first-class fixture of his career, Marsh scored his highest first-class score of nine not out as New South Wales were bowled out for 191. He then took 2/39 in the first innings as New South Wales took a 60-run first innings lead. He finished his career with 3/23 in the second innings, including a final burst of 3/0, to help his team to a victory. Later in the season, Marsh played in a match for New South Wales against Australia, which was not first-class. He took the wicket of Clem Hill as the match ended in a draw.

Marsh was never selected again, although he continued to dominate grade cricket. He was the leading wicket-taker for three consecutive seasons from 1901–02 to 1903–04, taking a total of 158 wickets at an average of 10.94.

Two years later against Plum Warner's MCC team, there were further calls for Marsh to be selected for the Test team as Australia fell 1–2 behind in the Ashes. Marsh had taken 5/55 against the Englishmen in a match at Bathurst, delivering a mixture of fast bowling and off spin. His victims included George Hirst and Warner himself. No formal complaint about Marsh's bowling was lodged by the English but his bowling did raise eyebrows. The general consensus among the English touring party was that Marsh's bowling was unfair, with Warner describing him as a "shier", a 19th-century term for a thrower. Warner asserted that no English umpire would tolerate such a bowling action. Despite this, the English players described him as the best bowler that they had faced on the tour. Warner and Noble were confident that Crockett would no-ball Marsh out of the match if the Australian Test selectors picked the bowler. As a result, Marsh was effectively excluded from the Australian side and his first-class career was limited to just six matches in which he took 34 wickets at an average of 21.47. The Australian Test batsman and captain Warren Bardsley rated Marsh alongside Fred Spofforth and England's Sydney Barnes. The comparison to Barnes was praise indeed; Barnes was the only bowler in Test history with over 120 wickets to have a bowling average under 20, with 189 wickets at an average of just 16.43. Bardsley said that the only reason that Marsh was "kept ... out of big cricket was his color". Jack Pollard said that Marsh "was clearly the best Australian bowler of his time but unfortunately that was a period when the White Australia policy prevailed. Marsh's name was scratched from the list of players ... by an official who was simply carrying out the racist customs of the day."

Popular with teammates and known for his sportsmanship, Marsh was regarded as an average fielder and had minimal batting skill, with a batting average of 5.00. He played out his days in the Sydney competition and topped the bowling aggregates from 1901 to 1904. Les Poidevin described Marsh as "a well set-up, perfectly built ... man, with an ebony-black, smooth, clear shining skin and twinkling black eyes" who "is quite good looking". Marsh was short for a fast bowler standing 5 ft 7 ins (170 cm) tall. In later years, Marsh experimented with the googly. Photographs of Marsh often show him fashionably dressed in a suit and sporting a moustache.

== Later years ==
When Marsh's cricket career ended in 1905, he resumed professional sprinting; in 1906, he ran against Arthur Postle at a meeting organised by John Wren in Melbourne. The race was organised to give Postle, then Australia's fastest man, a chance to break the 100-yard world record. In front of 12,000 spectators on a wet track, Marsh starting from a two-yard start maintained an early lead until Postle caught him on the line. Postle was declared the winner with a 10-second time, but some observers claimed that it was a dead heat. He retired from competitive sport after the race.

Marsh joined Alexander's Hippodrome Company, travelling around Australia in a sideshow, where his cricketing fame brought much attention. His activities thereafter are unclear, but it is likely that he became an itinerant worker. In retirement, Marsh drank heavily and was jailed for 14 days for committing an assault in Melbourne in 1909, something he blamed on alcohol.

Marsh died after an assault caused by an argument outside the pool room of the Royal Hotel in Orange, New South Wales. Two people were charged with manslaughter, but they were acquitted. Marsh was buried in an unmarked grave. The Bulletin wrote in Marsh's obituary that he was "a darkly troubled man with manners which white brothers found impossible to put up with".

== Legacy ==
The Jack Marsh History Lecture, held annually by the Sydney Cricket Ground Trust since 2015, is named in Marsh's honour. In 2015 Gideon Haigh's subject was "How Victor Trumper Changed Cricket Forever". Greg de Moore in 2016 presented "Tom Wills: First Wild Man of Australian Sport", a subject he'd spent years researching.

== See also ==
- List of New South Wales representative cricketers
- List of cricketers called for throwing in top-class cricket matches in Australia
