= John McGuire (sportsman) =

Australian rules footballer and cricketer

Personal information
- Full name: John Peter McGuire
- Born: 14 July 1954 (age 72)
- Original team: Northam

Playing career^{1}
Years	Club	Games (Goals)
1973–1979	East Perth	85 (19)
1980–1983	Perth	27 (8)
- ^{1} Playing statistics correct to the end of 1983.

John Peter McGuire (born 14 July 1954) is a former Australian rules football player and cricketer. He is of Aboriginal descent.

== Biography ==
McGuire attended Guildford Grammar School between 1970 and 1972. He and his wife Karen share a son and a daughter.

== Cricket ==
McGuire played most of his career for Mount Lawley District Cricket Club in Western Australian Grade Cricket and is second in the all-time runscoring list for the first grade competition, scoring 10,004 runs. He also holds several club records, including the most career runs (9204) and the most career catches (160).

In January 1988 he captained a team of Aboriginal players who played a Prime Minister's XI personally captained by Bob Hawke. The team later in the year toured England to mark the Australian Bicentenary.

== Australian rules football ==
McGuire played 85 games for East Perth Football Club in the West Australian Football League, including the 1978 premiership-winning team.

He then transferred to the Perth Football Club in 1980.
