= Albert Ground, Sydney =

Cricket ground in Australia

Coordinates: 33°53.7′S 151°12.5′E

Albert Ground
- Interactive map of Albert Ground

Ground information
- Location: Redfern, Sydney, Australia
- Country: Australia
- Establishment: 1864

Team information
New South Wales	(1871–77)
Victoria	(1871–76)
- As of 15 October 2020; Source: Ground profile

The Albert Ground was a cricket ground located in the Sydney suburb of Redfern between 1864 and 1877.

== History ==
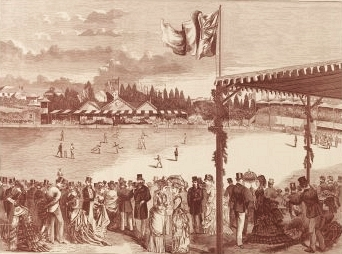
Lithograph of an 1876 intercolonial cricket match between New South Wales and Victoria at the Albert Ground

Cricket had been played in NSW since 1803, first in Hyde Park and then in the Domain. Neither were satisfactory facilities mainly because they were open grounds on which spectators walked and animals grazed. Fences could not be erected to keep people and animals out or to charge much needed admission.

When the Albert Ground opened in Redfern on 29 October 1864, these problems appeared to be solved. The ground had been developed as a money-making venture in the swampy area that Redfern was at the time.

Despite this, the Albert Ground had significant advantages over Sydney’s existing cricket facilities. It was centrally located and featured good facilities for players and crowd alike. There was a grandstand in the north west corner and a pavilion ran around three sides of the ground. A row of trees had been planted by the English cricket tourists of 1863-1864 captained by George Parr.

The pitch was made of a matted couch grass and was very spongy and soft. It was a slow pitch that favoured the bowlers. The ground was the home of the Albert Club, one of the most powerful in Sydney, which could boast three teams of 11. The club’s players wore white caps and pants and blue shirts and counted amongst their number the greatest bowler of the day ‘The Demon’ Fred Spofforth.

Above all however, the Albert Ground had been established as a business with the aim of making money and fees were charged to those who wanted to use it, including the NSW Cricket Association. The cost to the NSWCA of staging matches there was so high that until the early 1870s it continued to use the Domain whenever possible despite its disadvantages. By then inter-colonial games had become so important and popular that the NSWCA had little choice but to use the Albert Ground for these at least. In all, five first-class matches were played at the Albert Ground between the 1870 and 1877 seasons.

In the late 1870s however, the Albert Ground company was wound up and the ground closed. The NSWCA began using the Garrison Ground at Moore Park, later to be renamed the Association Ground and then the Sydney Cricket Ground. Eventually the Albert Ground was demolished.

The Albert Ground was located to the east of Redfern Oval in the block now roughly bounded by Elizabeth, Phillip, Kettle and Moorehead Streets. The site is now consists of housing, the PCYC South Sydney and vacant land that is fenced off.

== List of cricket matches ==
Below is a list of the first-class cricket matches that were played at the Albert Ground.

Season	Teams	Date	Result	Ref
1870–71	New South Wales v Victoria	9–11, 13 March 1871	Victoria won by 48 runs	
1872–73	New South Wales v Victoria	28 February–2, 7–8 March 1873	Victoria won by 24 runs	
1874–75	New South Wales v Victoria	5–6, 8 March 1875	New South Wales won by 77 runs	
1875–76	New South Wales v Victoria	25–26, 28 February 1876	New South Wales won by 195 runs	
1876–77	New South Wales v James Lillywhite's XI	15–16 January 1877	Match drawn	
