= 2019 AFL season =

123rd season of the Australian Football League (AFL)

2019 AFL premiership season
- Date: 21 March – 28 September
- Teams: 18
- Premiers: Richmond; 12th premiership
- Runners-up: Greater Western Sydney (1st runners-up)
- Minor premiers: Geelong; 14th minor premiership
- Brownlow Medallist: Nat Fyfe (Fremantle – 33 votes)
- Coleman Medallist: Jeremy Cameron (Greater Western Sydney – 67 goals)

Attendance
- Matches played: 207
- Total attendance: 7,517,677 (36,317 per match)
- Highest (H&A): 92,241 (round 6, Essendon v Collingwood)
- Highest (finals): 100,014 (Grand Final, Richmond vs. Greater Western Sydney)

The 2019 AFL season was the 123rd season of the Australian Football League (AFL), the highest level senior men's Australian rules football competition in Australia, which was known as the Victorian Football League until 1989. The season featured eighteen clubs, ran from 21 March until 28 September, and comprised a 22-game home-and-away season followed by a finals series featuring the top eight clubs.

The premiership was won by the Richmond Football Club for the twelfth time, after it defeated Greater Western Sydney by 89 points in the 2019 AFL Grand Final.

== Rule changes ==
There were several alterations to the laws of the game in 2019:

- Starting positions were mandated at centre bounces, with each team required to have six players inside each 50m arc – including one in each goal square – four players in the centre square and two along the wings. A team guilty of the 6-6-6 rule, as it became known, received one warning per game, then conceded a free kick on subsequent infractions.
- At kick-ins after behinds, the full back was no longer required to kick to himself to play on from the goal square, and the man on the mark was positioned 10m from the kick-off line instead of 5m.
- The spot of any mark or free kick received within nine metres of a player's defensive goal line would be brought back to the nine-metre line, rather than remaining at the spot of the mark or free kick.
- Team runners were no longer permitted to enter the playing surface except for the break in play after a goal had been kicked; water carriers were also forbidden from entering during live play.
- The protocol for a 50-metre penalty was amended, allowing the player with the ball to advance to the new mark at his own pace without being interfered with by an opponent (which could be penalised by a second 50-metre penalty), and with the right to play on at any time while the 50m penalty was being measured out. Previously, measuring out a 50m penalty was done with time off.
- The push-in-the-back rule was relaxed, allowing a player to place his hands on the back of his opponent to protect his position in a marking contest, provided he does not push. This removed the more stringent interpretation added in 2007 which saw a free kick to penalised any use of hands on an opponent's back in a marking contest.
- The concept of prior opportunity as it applied to holding the ball was formally defined for the first time as part of a copyedit of the rule. The only change to the intent of the rule was that a ruckman who takes direct possession of the ball in a ruck contest was no longer considered to have had prior opportunity – removing a provision which had existed since 2003.

== Pre-season ==
The pre-season began with the 2019 AFLX tournament, the second and, as of 2024, latter AFLX event featuring AFL players. Unlike the 2018 competition, it was not contested by the clubs, but rather by four all-star teams selected by their captains: Patrick Dangerfield (captain of the Bolts), Nat Fyfe (Flyers), Jack Riewoldt (Rampage), and Eddie Betts (Deadlys, composed entirely of Indigenous players). The tournament occurred at Marvel Stadium, Melbourne on 22 February 2019 and was won by the Rampage.

This was followed by the pre-season series of games, known as the 2019 JLT Community Series, with teams playing two games each. The games were stand-alone, with no overall winner of the series. Each team played two games, many at suburban or regional venues, while all games were televised on Fox Footy.

	Week 1
Thursday, 28 February (6:40 pm)	Carlton 15.10 (100)	def.	Essendon 14.7 (91)	Ikon Park (crowd: 8,215)	Report
Friday, 1 March (4:10 pm)	West Coast 15.9 (99)	def.	Geelong 8.17 (65)	Leederville Oval (crowd: 6,028)	Report
Saturday, 2 March (1:10 pm)	North Melbourne 11.11 (77)	def. by	St Kilda 15.12 (102)	Avalon Airport Oval, Werribee (crowd: 1,596)	Report
Saturday, 2 March (3:40 pm)	Adelaide 16.10 (106)	def.	Port Adelaide 14.5 (89)	The Memorial Oval, Port Pirie (crowd: 5,482)	Report
Saturday, 2 March (7:10 pm)	Greater Western Sydney 12.9 (81)	def.	Sydney 8.11 (59)	Blacktown International Sportspark (crowd: 2,636)	Report
Sunday, 3 March (12:40 pm)	Brisbane Lions 15.12 (102)	def.	Hawthorn 8.12 (60)	Moreton Bay Sports Complex, Burpengary (crowd: 2,812)	Report
Sunday, 3 March (4:40 pm)	Richmond 16.17 (113)	def.	Melbourne 16.5 (101)	Deakin Reserve, Shepparton (crowd: 5,190)	Report
Sunday, 3 March (6:40 pm)	Gold Coast 11.10 (76)	def.	Western Bulldogs 10.12 (72)	Great Barrier Reef Arena, Mackay (crowd: 2,016)	Report
Monday, 4 March (3:40 pm)	Fremantle 12.12 (84)	def. by	Collingwood 17.9 (111)	HBF Arena, Joondalup (crowd: 5,245)	Report

	Week 2
Thursday, 7 March (7:10 pm)	Geelong 15.11 (101)	def.	Essendon 11.7 (73)	GMHBA Stadium (crowd: 9,070)	Report
Friday, 8 March (7:10 pm)	Greater Western Sydney 7.15 (57)	def. by	Adelaide 10.15 (75)	UNSW Canberra Oval (crowd: 4,098)	Report
Saturday, 9 March (12:40 pm)	Port Adelaide 19.9 (123)	def.	North Melbourne 16.6 (102)	Alberton Oval (crowd: 6,271)	Report
Saturday, 9 March (4:10 pm)	Melbourne 15.7 (97)	def. by	Brisbane Lions 16.8 (104)	Casey Fields (crowd: 4,215)	Report
Saturday, 9 March (7:10 pm)	Hawthorn 13.9 (87)	def. by	Richmond 14.11 (95)	University of Tasmania Stadium (crowd: 6,982)	Report
Sunday, 10 March (1:10 pm)	Sydney 19.9 (123)	def.	Gold Coast 11.15 (81)	Oakes Oval, Lismore (crowd: 4,918)	Report
Sunday, 10 March (4:10 pm)	Western Bulldogs 12.7 (79)	def. by	St Kilda 14.9 (93)	Mars Stadium, Ballarat (crowd: 4,384)	Report
Sunday, 10 March (4:10 pm)	Fremantle 8.10 (58)	def. by	West Coast 16.13 (109)	Rushton Park, Mandurah (crowd: 8,047)	Report
Monday, 11 March (2:10 pm)	Collingwood 11.11 (77)	def.	Carlton 10.13 (73)	Morwell Recreation Reserve (crowd: 6,386)	Report

== Premiership season ==
Notable features of the draw included:

- St Kilda replacing Gold Coast in hosting Port Adelaide in Shanghai.
- Tony Ireland Stadium in Townsville hosted an AFL premiership match for the first time, when Gold Coast played St Kilda in round 13. The fixture replaced the game held in Cairns between 2011 and 2018.
- Collingwood hosted Melbourne for the Queen's Birthday match for the first time since 1999.

2019 marked the first year of games being broadcast in 4K resolution, with a total of 46 ultra-high-definition games being shown on Foxtel.

=== Round 1 ===
	Round 1 (Opening Round)
Thursday, 21 March (7:20 pm)	Carlton 9.10 (64)	def. by	Richmond 14.13 (97)	MCG (crowd: 85,016)	Report
Friday, 22 March (7:50 pm)	Collingwood 9.11 (65)	def. by	Geelong 10.12 (72)	MCG (crowd: 78,017)	Report
Saturday, 23 March (1:45 pm)	Melbourne 9.7 (61)	def. by	Port Adelaide 12.15 (87)	MCG (crowd: 38,866)	Report
Saturday, 23 March (4:05 pm)	Adelaide 7.13 (55)	def. by	Hawthorn 12.15 (87)	Adelaide Oval (crowd: 50,180)	Report
Saturday, 23 March (7:20 pm)	Brisbane Lions 15.12 (102)	def.	West Coast 8.10 (58)	Gabba (crowd: 20,029)	Report
Saturday, 23 March (7:25 pm)	Western Bulldogs 11.16 (82)	def.	Sydney 9.11 (65)	Marvel Stadium (crowd: 32,303)	Report
Sunday, 24 March (1:10 pm)	St Kilda 13.7 (85)	def.	Gold Coast 13.6 (84)	Marvel Stadium (crowd: 20,291)	Report
Sunday, 24 March (3:20 pm)	Greater Western Sydney 16.16 (112)	def.	Essendon 5.10 (40)	GIANTS Stadium (crowd: 15,424)	Report
Sunday, 24 March (3:20 pm)	Fremantle 21.15 (141)	def.	North Melbourne 9.5 (59)	Optus Stadium (crowd: 40,033)	Report
Despite a swathe of rule changes designed to increase scoring, it was the lowest average scoring opening round since 1965.

=== Round 2 ===
	Round 2
Thursday, 28 March (7:20 pm)	Richmond 10.6 (66)	def. by	Collingwood 17.8 (110)	MCG (crowd: 70,699)	Report
Friday, 29 March (7:50 pm)	Sydney 8.14 (62)	def. by	Adelaide 12.16 (88)	SCG (crowd: 32,575)	Report
Saturday, 30 March (4:35 pm)	Essendon 9.11 (65)	def. by	St Kilda 10.16 (76)	Marvel Stadium (crowd: 44,252)	Report
Saturday, 30 March (4:40 pm)	Port Adelaide 13.10 (88)	def.	Carlton 11.6 (72)	Adelaide Oval (crowd: 41,552)	Report
Saturday, 30 March (5:10 pm)	West Coast 16.8 (104)	def.	Greater Western Sydney 7.10 (52)	Optus Stadium (crowd: 54,985)	Report
Saturday, 30 March (7:25 pm)	Geelong 20.6 (126)	def.	Melbourne 6.10 (46)	GMHBA Stadium (crowd: 27,561)	Report
Sunday, 31 March (1:10 pm)	North Melbourne 13.9 (87)	def. by	Brisbane Lions 16.11 (107)	Marvel Stadium (crowd: 23,100)	Report
Sunday, 31 March (3:20 pm)	Hawthorn 13.9 (87)	def. by	Western Bulldogs 16.10 (106)	MCG (crowd: 39,368)	Report
Sunday, 31 March (3:40 pm)	Gold Coast 7.19 (61)	def.	Fremantle 8.10 (58)	Metricon Stadium (crowd: 10,119)	Report

=== Round 3 ===
	Round 3
Thursday, 4 April (7:20 pm)	Adelaide 10.15 (75)	def. by	Geelong 14.15 (99)	Adelaide Oval (crowd: 45,631)	Report
Friday, 5 April (7:50 pm)	Melbourne 18.4 (112)	def. by	Essendon 20.10 (130)	MCG (crowd: 52,475)	Report
Saturday, 6 April (1:45 pm)	Carlton 10.14 (74)	def. by	Sydney 14.9 (93)	Marvel Stadium (crowd: 39,290)	Report
Saturday, 6 April (4:35 pm)	Greater Western Sydney 19.11 (125)	def.	Richmond 10.16 (76)	GIANTS Stadium (crowd: 12,697)	Report
Saturday, 6 April (6:25 pm)	Brisbane Lions 16.11 (107)	def.	Port Adelaide 13.12 (90)	Gabba (crowd: 19,958)	Report
Saturday, 6 April (7:25 pm)	Collingwood 11.10 (76)	def. by	West Coast 15.8 (98)	MCG (crowd: 60,878)	Report
Sunday, 7 April (2:20 pm)	Western Bulldogs 9.14 (68)	def. by	Gold Coast 10.13 (73)	Marvel Stadium (crowd: 22,499)	Report
Sunday, 7 April (3:20 pm)	Hawthorn 13.9 (87)	def.	North Melbourne 10.11 (71)	MCG (crowd: 36,174)	Report
Sunday, 7 April (3:20 pm)	Fremantle 11.5 (71)	def.	St Kilda 9.12 (66)	Optus Stadium (crowd: 38,227)	Report

=== Round 4 ===
	Round 4
Thursday, 11 April (7:20 pm)	Sydney 11.12 (78)	def. by	Melbourne 15.10 (100)	SCG (crowd: 26,669)	Report
Friday, 12 April (7:50 pm)	Collingwood 11.12 (78)	def.	Western Bulldogs 9.10 (64)	MCG (crowd: 59,257)	Report
Saturday, 13 April (1:45 pm)	Geelong 11.9 (75)	def. by	Greater Western Sydney 11.13 (79)	GMHBA Stadium (crowd: 28,780)	Report
Saturday, 13 April (2:10 pm)	Essendon 17.10 (112)	def.	Brisbane Lions 9.11 (65)	MCG (crowd: 48,289)	Report
Saturday, 13 April (4:05 pm)	Port Adelaide 14.8 (92)	def. by	Richmond 15.9 (99)	Adelaide Oval (crowd: 38,864)	Report
Saturday, 13 April (7:25 pm)	North Melbourne 9.17 (71)	def.	Adelaide 8.11 (59)	Marvel Stadium (crowd: 17,207)	Report
Saturday, 13 April (6:10 pm)	West Coast 10.9 (69)	def.	Fremantle 7.14 (56)	Optus Stadium (crowd: 58,219)	Report
Sunday, 14 April (2:40 pm)	Gold Coast 8.11 (59)	def.	Carlton 8.9 (57)	Metricon Stadium (crowd: 14,176)	Report
Sunday, 14 April (3:20 pm)	St Kilda 10.14 (74)	def.	Hawthorn 10.9 (69)	Marvel Stadium (crowd: 35,883)	Report

=== Round 5 ===
	Round 5 (Easter)
Thursday, 18 April (7:35 pm)	Brisbane Lions 8.13 (61)	def. by	Collingwood 18.15 (123)	Gabba (crowd: 34,017)	Report
Friday, 19 April (4:20 pm)	North Melbourne 7.16 (58)	def. by	Essendon 17.14 (116)	Marvel Stadium (crowd: 48,278)	Report
Friday, 19 April (6:10 pm)	West Coast 8.5 (53)	def. by	Port Adelaide 13.17 (95)	Optus Stadium (crowd: 49,290)	Report
Saturday, 20 April (1:45 pm)	Greater Western Sydney 11.16 (82)	def. by	Fremantle 16.10 (106)	UNSW Canberra Oval (crowd: 11,277)	Report
Saturday, 20 April (4:35 pm)	Melbourne 7.13 (55)	def. by	St Kilda 15.5 (95)	MCG (crowd: 35,558)	Report
Saturday, 20 April (7:25 pm)	Richmond 13.11 (89)	def.	Sydney 10.7 (67)	Marvel Stadium (crowd: 40,053)	Report
Sunday, 21 April (1:10 pm)	Western Bulldogs 7.15 (57)	def. by	Carlton 15.11 (101)	Marvel Stadium (crowd: 35,069)	Report
Sunday, 21 April (4:10 pm)	Adelaide 18.11 (119)	def.	Gold Coast 6.10 (46)	Adelaide Oval (crowd: 40,847)	Report
Monday, 22 April (3:20 pm)	Hawthorn 13.12 (90)	def. by	Geelong 17.11 (113)	MCG (crowd: 66,347)	Report
Carlton scored over 100 points for the first time since round 11, 2016.

=== Round 6 ===
	Round 6 (ANZAC Round)
Wednesday, 24 April (7:35 pm)	Richmond 12.13 (85)	def.	Melbourne 6.6 (42)	MCG (crowd: 72,704)	Report
Thursday, 25 April (3:20 pm)	Essendon 10.9 (69)	def. by	Collingwood 10.13 (73)	MCG (crowd: 92,241)	Report
Friday, 26 April (7:20 pm)	Port Adelaide 12.16 (88)	def.	North Melbourne 11.6 (72)	Adelaide Oval (crowd: 36,099)	Report
Saturday, 27 April (1:45 pm)	Gold Coast 9.8 (62)	def. by	Brisbane Lions 16.15 (111)	Metricon Stadium (crowd: 13,694)	Report
Saturday, 27 April (4:35 pm)	St Kilda 10.8 (68)	def. by	Adelaide 15.7 (97)	Marvel Stadium (crowd: 28,404)	Report
Saturday, 27 April (7:25 pm)	Sydney 12.7 (79)	def. by	Greater Western Sydney 18.12 (120)	SCG (crowd: 29,780)	Report
Saturday, 27 April (6:10 pm)	Fremantle 13.10 (88)	def.	Western Bulldogs 9.15 (69)	Optus Stadium (crowd: 43,732)	Report
Sunday, 28 April (3:20 pm)	Hawthorn 13.15 (93)	def.	Carlton 13.10 (88)	University of Tasmania Stadium (crowd: 15,888)	Report
Sunday, 28 April (4:40 pm)	Geelong 15.14 (104)	def.	West Coast 7.4 (46)	GMHBA Stadium (crowd: 28,085)	Report

=== Round 7 ===
	Round 7
Friday, 3 May (7:50 pm)	Collingwood 15.18 (108)	def.	Port Adelaide 10.9 (69)	Marvel Stadium (crowd: 37,559)	Report
Saturday, 4 May (1:45 pm)	Melbourne 11.13 (79)	def.	Hawthorn 11.8 (74)	MCG (crowd: 40,864)	Report
Saturday, 4 May (1:45 pm)	Greater Western Sydney 18.6 (114)	def.	St Kilda 10.10 (70)	UNSW Canberra Oval (crowd: 12,633)	Report
Saturday, 4 May (4:35 pm)	Brisbane Lions 14.19 (103)	def.	Sydney 12.9 (81)	Gabba (crowd: 20,075)	Report
Saturday, 4 May (7:25 pm)	Western Bulldogs 15.9 (99)	def.	Richmond 7.10 (52)	Marvel Stadium (crowd: 36,151)	Report
Saturday, 4 May (6:10 pm)	West Coast 11.14 (80)	def.	Gold Coast 8.9 (57)	Optus Stadium (crowd: 47,497)	Report
Sunday, 5 May (1:10 pm)	Carlton 8.14 (62)	def. by	North Melbourne 18.12 (120)	Marvel Stadium (crowd: 42,430)	Report
Sunday, 5 May (3:20 pm)	Geelong 13.8 (86)	def.	Essendon 7.12 (54)	MCG (crowd: 63,527)	Report
Sunday, 5 May (4:10 pm)	Adelaide 7.9 (51)	def.	Fremantle 5.4 (34)	Adelaide Oval (crowd: 42,383)	Report
The Brisbane Lions' win over Sydney was its first win against the Swans since round 22, 2009, breaking an 11-game losing streak.

=== Round 8 ===
	Round 8
Friday, 10 May (7:50 pm)	Sydney 11.11 (77)	def.	Essendon 10.12 (72)	SCG (crowd: 26,502)	Report
Saturday, 11 May (1:45 pm)	Western Bulldogs 13.14 (92)	def.	Brisbane Lions 11.10 (76)	Mars Stadium (crowd: 9,039)	Report
Saturday, 11 May (1:45 pm)	Carlton 13.9 (87)	def. by	Collingwood 16.10 (106)	MCG (crowd: 69,289)	Report
Saturday, 11 May (4:35 pm)	Gold Coast 9.6 (60)	def. by	Melbourne 8.13 (61)	Metricon Stadium (crowd: 9,765)	Report
Saturday, 11 May (7:25 pm)	St Kilda 10.10 (70)	def. by	West Coast 12.16 (88)	Marvel Stadium (crowd: 24,246)	Report
Saturday, 11 May (7:10 pm)	Port Adelaide 9.14 (68)	def. by	Adelaide 13.10 (88)	Adelaide Oval (crowd: 49,675)	Report
Sunday, 12 May (1:10 pm)	North Melbourne 11.14 (80)	def. by	Geelong 16.8 (104)	Marvel Stadium (crowd: 21,156)	Report
Sunday, 12 May (3:20 pm)	Hawthorn 10.11 (71)	def.	Greater Western Sydney 5.8 (38)	MCG (crowd: 14,636)	Report
Sunday, 12 May (3:20 pm)	Fremantle 12.14 (86)	def. by	Richmond 17.9 (111)	Optus Stadium (crowd: 42,641)	Report
Essendon’s David Myers missed a chance to win the game after the siren against Sydney.

=== Round 9 ===
	Round 9
Friday, 17 May (6:10 pm)	West Coast 13.7 (85)	def.	Melbourne 9.15 (69)	Optus Stadium (crowd: 51,162)	Report
Saturday, 18 May (1:45 pm)	Collingwood 17.10 (112)	def.	St Kilda 10.11 (71)	MCG (crowd: 60,702)	Report
Saturday, 18 May (2:10 pm)	Brisbane Lions 13.15 (93)	def.	Adelaide 13.14 (92)	Gabba (crowd: 20,405)	Report
Saturday, 18 May (4:35 pm)	Geelong 21.7 (133)	def.	Western Bulldogs 13.11 (89)	GMHBA Stadium (crowd: 31,373)	Report
Saturday, 18 May (7:25 pm)	Essendon 8.12 (60)	def.	Fremantle 7.11 (53)	Marvel Stadium (crowd: 29,176)	Report
Saturday, 18 May (7:25 pm)	North Melbourne 10.12 (72)	def. by	Sydney 11.11 (77)	Blundstone Arena (crowd: 12,799)	Report
Sunday, 19 May (12:40 pm)	Port Adelaide 13.11 (89)	def.	Gold Coast 7.9 (51)	Adelaide Oval (crowd: 26,129)	Report
Sunday, 19 May (3:20 pm)	Richmond 14.11 (95)	def.	Hawthorn 8.11 (59)	MCG (crowd: 64,936)	Report
Sunday, 19 May (4:40 pm)	Greater Western Sydney 20.18 (138)	def.	Carlton 7.3 (45)	GIANTS Stadium (crowd: 9,599)	Report

=== Round 10 ===
	Round 10 (Sir Doug Nicholls Round Week 1)
Friday, 24 May (7:50 pm)	Sydney 11.7 (73)	def. by	Collingwood 11.14 (80)	SCG (crowd: 34,649)	Report
Saturday, 25 May (1:45 pm)	Hawthorn 12.8 (80)	def.	Port Adelaide 6.13 (49)	University of Tasmania Stadium (crowd: 11,637)	Report
Saturday, 25 May (2:10 pm)	Western Bulldogs 13.12 (90)	def. by	North Melbourne 18.7 (115)	Marvel Stadium (crowd: 26,156)	Report
Saturday, 25 May (4:35 pm)	Adelaide 10.13 (73)	def. by	West Coast 13.7 (85)	Adelaide Oval (crowd: 41,630)	Report
Saturday, 25 May (7:25 pm)	Gold Coast 9.10 (64)	def. by	Geelong 13.13 (91)	Metricon Stadium (crowd: 13,144)	Report
Saturday, 25 May (7:25 pm)	Richmond 10.13 (73)	def.	Essendon 6.14 (50)	MCG (crowd: 80,176)	Report
Sunday, 26 May (1:10 pm)	Melbourne 10.8 (68)	def. by	Greater Western Sydney 14.10 (94)	MCG (crowd: 20,023)	Report
Sunday, 26 May (3:20 pm)	St Kilda 9.14 (68)	def.	Carlton 8.7 (55)	Marvel Stadium (crowd: 35,058)	Report
Sunday, 26 May (3:20 pm)	Fremantle 10.13 (73)	def.	Brisbane Lions 10.12 (72)	Optus Stadium (crowd: 36,383)	Report
Fremantle's Michael Walters kicked a behind after the final siren to win the match against Brisbane.

=== Round 11 ===
	Round 11 (Sir Doug Nicholls Round Week 2)
Friday, 31 May (7:50 pm)	North Melbourne 15.9 (99)	def.	Richmond 9.8 (62)	Marvel Stadium (crowd: 29,365)	Report
Saturday, 1 June (1:45 pm)	Collingwood 11.9 (75)	def. by	Fremantle 11.13 (79)	MCG (crowd: 41,774)	Report
Saturday, 1 June (1:45 pm)	Greater Western Sydney 19.12 (126)	def.	Gold Coast 6.7 (43)	GIANTS Stadium (crowd: 7,581)	Report
Saturday, 1 June (4:35 pm)	Geelong 13.7 (85)	def.	Sydney 8.15 (63)	GMHBA Stadium (crowd: 29,021)	Report
Saturday, 1 June (7:25 pm)	Brisbane Lions 12.13 (85)	def.	Hawthorn 10.6 (66)	Gabba (crowd: 25,051)	Report
Saturday, 1 June (7:10 pm)	Melbourne 12.16 (88)	def. by	Adelaide 14.6 (90)	TIO Stadium (crowd: 10,634)	Report
Sunday, 2 June (12:20 pm)	St Kilda 9.15 (69)	def. by	Port Adelaide 22.7 (139)	Jiangwan Stadium (crowd: 9,412)	Report
Sunday, 2 June (3:20 pm)	Essendon 11.8 (74)	def.	Carlton 4.9 (33)	MCG (crowd: 50,423)	Report
Sunday, 2 June (3:20 pm)	West Coast 21.7 (133)	def.	Western Bulldogs 10.12 (72)	Optus Stadium (crowd: 53,195)	Report

=== Round 12 ===
	Round 12
Friday, 7 June (7:50 pm)	Richmond 5.7 (37)	def. by	Geelong 16.8 (104)	MCG (crowd: 65,214)	Report
Saturday, 8 June (1:45 pm)	Carlton 11.12 (78)	def.	Brisbane Lions 9.9 (63)	Marvel Stadium (crowd: 32,214)	Report
Saturday, 8 June (4:35 pm)	Gold Coast 11.6 (72)	def. by	North Melbourne 14.15 (99)	Metricon Stadium (crowd: 9,305)	Report
Saturday, 8 June (7:10 pm)	Adelaide 12.10 (82)	def.	Greater Western Sydney 9.7 (61)	Adelaide Oval (crowd: 41,710)	Report
Sunday, 9 June (3:20 pm)	Sydney 18.8 (116)	def.	West Coast 10.11 (71)	SCG (crowd: 36,640)	Report
Monday, 10 June (3:20 pm)	Collingwood 15.8 (98)	def.	Melbourne 7.15 (57)	MCG (crowd: 74,036)	Report
	Bye; Essendon, Fremantle, Hawthorn, Port Adelaide, St Kilda, Western Bulldogs

=== Round 13 ===
	Round 13
Thursday, 13 June (7:20 pm)	Adelaide 15.11 (101)	def.	Richmond 9.14 (68)	Adelaide Oval (crowd: 40,837)	Report
Friday, 14 June (7:50 pm)	Essendon 14.12 (96)	def.	Hawthorn 11.11 (77)	Marvel Stadium (crowd: 44,846)	Report
Saturday, 15 June (1:45 pm)	Gold Coast 11.10 (76)	def. by	St Kilda 11.14 (80)	Riverway Stadium (crowd: 7,243)	Report
Saturday, 15 June (2:35 pm)	Fremantle 15.10 (100)	def.	Port Adelaide 12.7 (79)	Optus Stadium (crowd: 37,451)	Report
Saturday, 15 June (7:10 pm)	Carlton 15.10 (100)	def. by	Western Bulldogs 15.13 (103)	Marvel Stadium (crowd: 35,479)	Report
Sunday, 16 June (3:20 pm)	North Melbourne 10.8 (68)	def. by	Greater Western Sydney 14.7 (91)	Blundstone Arena (crowd: 7,832)	Report
	Bye; Brisbane Lions, Collingwood, Geelong, Melbourne, Sydney, West Coast

=== Round 14 ===
	Round 14
Thursday, 20 June (6:10 pm)	West Coast 14.22 (106)	def.	Essendon 11.5 (71)	Optus Stadium (crowd: 52,810)	Report
Friday, 21 June (7:50 pm)	Sydney 12.10 (82)	def.	Hawthorn 9.9 (63)	SCG (crowd: 29,553)	Report
Saturday, 22 June (1:45 pm)	Melbourne 13.7 (85)	def.	Fremantle 11.5 (71)	MCG (crowd: 20,211)	Report
Saturday, 22 June (4:35 pm)	St Kilda 8.11 (59)	def. by	Brisbane Lions 17.13 (115)	Marvel Stadium (crowd: 22,885)	Report
Saturday, 22 June (7:10 pm)	Port Adelaide 9.13 (67)	def.	Geelong 8.8 (56)	Adelaide Oval (crowd: 37,726)	Report
Sunday, 23 June (3:20 pm)	Western Bulldogs 10.13 (73)	def. by	Collingwood 13.4 (82)	Marvel Stadium (crowd: 39,836)	Report
	Bye; Adelaide, Carlton, Gold Coast, Greater Western Sydney, North Melbourne, Richmond

=== Round 15 ===
	Round 15
Thursday, 27 June (7:20 pm)	Essendon 12.5 (77)	def.	Greater Western Sydney 10.11 (71)	Marvel Stadium (crowd: 25,195)	Report
Friday, 28 June (7:50 pm)	Geelong 14.12 (96)	def.	Adelaide 10.9 (69)	GMHBA Stadium (crowd: 28,108)	Report
Saturday, 29 June (1:45 pm)	Hawthorn 9.17 (71)	def. by	West Coast 11.11 (77)	MCG (crowd: 31,895)	Report
Saturday, 29 June (4:35 pm)	Sydney 14.9 (93)	def.	Gold Coast 7.9 (51)	SCG (crowd: 26,194)	Report
Saturday, 29 June (7:25 pm)	Collingwood 5.7 (37)	def. by	North Melbourne 11.15 (81)	Marvel Stadium (crowd: 38,801)	Report
Saturday, 29 June (7:10 pm)	Port Adelaide 5.11 (41)	def. by	Western Bulldogs 10.6 (66)	Adelaide Oval (crowd: 25,623)	Report
Sunday, 30 June (1:10 pm)	St Kilda 10.10 (70)	def. by	Richmond 16.7 (103)	Marvel Stadium (crowd: 40,962)	Report
Sunday, 30 June (3:20 pm)	Brisbane Lions 15.17 (107)	def.	Melbourne 11.8 (74)	Gabba (crowd: 24,809)	Report
Sunday, 30 June (3:20 pm)	Fremantle 11.9 (75)	def. by	Carlton 11.13 (79)	Optus Stadium (crowd: 37,293)	Report
Collingwood’s score of 5.7 (37) was its lowest score since round 5, 1995.

=== Round 16 ===
	Round 16
Friday, 5 July (7:50 pm)	Hawthorn 9.13 (67)	def.	Collingwood 9.9 (63)	MCG (crowd: 66,407)	Report
Saturday, 6 July (1:45 pm)	Essendon 11.10 (76)	def.	Sydney 9.12 (66)	MCG (crowd: 60,199)	Report
Saturday, 6 July (2:10 pm)	Gold Coast 9.4 (58)	def. by	Richmond 23.12 (150)	Metricon Stadium (crowd: 16,031)	Report
Saturday, 6 July (4:05 pm)	Adelaide 5.14 (44)	def. by	Port Adelaide 15.11 (101)	Adelaide Oval (crowd: 50,544)	Report
Saturday, 6 July (7:25 pm)	Western Bulldogs 10.11 (71)	def.	Geelong 7.13 (55)	Marvel Stadium (crowd: 35,641)	Report
Saturday, 6 July (6:10 pm)	Fremantle 2.19 (31)	def. by	West Coast 19.8 (122)	Optus Stadium (crowd: 56,358)	Report
Sunday, 7 July (1:10 pm)	Carlton 15.10 (100)	def. by	Melbourne 15.15 (105)	MCG (crowd: 55,593)	Report
Sunday, 7 July (3:20 pm)	North Melbourne 17.10 (112)	def.	St Kilda 11.7 (73)	Blundstone Arena (crowd: 10,696)	Report
Sunday, 7 July (4:40 pm)	Greater Western Sydney 11.8 (74)	def. by	Brisbane Lions 14.10 (94)	GIANTS Stadium (crowd: 12,268)	Report
Fremantle's performance against West Coast set numerous records and milestones; it was Fremantle's lowest score in a Western Derby, heaviest losing margin in a Western Derby since round 6, 2000, and was the least accurate final score by any team since Carlton's score of 1.10 (16) in round 11, 1991.

=== Round 17 ===
	Round 17
Friday, 12 July (6:10 pm)	West Coast 12.5 (77)	def. by	Collingwood 11.12 (78)	Optus Stadium (crowd: 56,251)	Report
Saturday, 13 July (1:45 pm)	Sydney 8.14 (62)	def. by	Carlton 9.15 (69)	SCG (crowd: 32,570)	Report
Saturday, 13 July (2:10 pm)	Hawthorn 12.12 (84)	def.	Fremantle 8.5 (53)	University of Tasmania Stadium (crowd: 13,006)	Report
Saturday, 13 July (4:35 pm)	Essendon 12.14 (86)	def.	North Melbourne 12.9 (81)	Marvel Stadium (crowd: 45,682)	Report
Saturday, 13 July (7:25 pm)	Gold Coast 8.8 (56)	def. by	Adelaide 23.13 (151)	Metricon Stadium (crowd: 8,741)	Report
Saturday, 13 July (7:25 pm)	Geelong 12.12 (84)	def.	St Kilda 8.9 (57)	GMHBA Stadium (crowd: 24,035)	Report
Sunday, 14 July (1:10 pm)	Richmond 13.16 (94)	def.	Greater Western Sydney 9.13 (67)	MCG (crowd: 38,986)	Report
Sunday, 14 July (3:20 pm)	Western Bulldogs 10.14 (74)	def.	Melbourne 9.12 (66)	Marvel Stadium (crowd: 26,781)	Report
Sunday, 14 July (4:10 pm)	Port Adelaide 6.13 (49)	def. by	Brisbane Lions 14.13 (97)	Adelaide Oval (crowd: 33,118)	Report

=== Round 18 ===
	Round 18
Friday, 19 July (7:20 pm)	Adelaide 10.15 (75)	def. by	Essendon 15.6 (96)	Adelaide Oval (crowd: 47,735)	Report
Saturday, 20 July (1:45 pm)	Richmond 15.11 (101)	def.	Port Adelaide 9.9 (63)	MCG (crowd: 41,642)	Report
Saturday, 20 July (2:10 pm)	Carlton 15.9 (99)	def.	Gold Coast 11.9 (75)	Marvel Stadium (crowd: 31,765)	Report
Saturday, 20 July (4:35 pm)	Greater Western Sydney 19.8 (122)	def.	Collingwood 11.9 (75)	GIANTS Stadium (crowd: 15,467)	Report
Saturday, 20 July (7:25 pm)	Brisbane Lions 12.15 (87)	def.	North Melbourne 12.3 (75)	Gabba (crowd: 23,833)	Report
Saturday, 20 July (6:10 pm)	Fremantle 7.10 (52)	def.	Sydney 7.9 (51)	Optus Stadium (crowd: 33,594)	Report
Sunday, 21 July (1:10 pm)	Geelong 8.13 (61)	def. by	Hawthorn 12.13 (85)	MCG (crowd: 53,636)	Report
Sunday, 21 July (2:50 pm)	Melbourne 11.12 (78)	def. by	West Coast 14.7 (91)	TIO Traeger Park (crowd: 7,164)	Report
Sunday, 21 July (4:40 pm)	St Kilda 17.14 (116)	def.	Western Bulldogs 14.5 (89)	Marvel Stadium (crowd: 21,705)	Report

=== Round 19 ===
	Round 19
Friday, 26 July (7:50 pm)	Collingwood 9.12 (66)	def. by	Richmond 14.14 (98)	MCG (crowd: 78,722)	Report
Saturday, 27 July (1:45 pm)	Hawthorn 7.18 (60)	def. by	Brisbane Lions 13.9 (87)	University of Tasmania Stadium (crowd: 15,157)	Report
Saturday, 27 July (2:10 pm)	Carlton 13.9 (87)	def.	Adelaide 9.6 (60)	MCG (crowd: 38,369)	Report
Saturday, 27 July (2:35 pm)	West Coast 18.13 (121)	def.	North Melbourne 10.12 (72)	Optus Stadium (crowd: 54,376)	Report
Saturday, 27 July (7:25 pm)	St Kilda 15.14 (104)	def.	Melbourne 13.7 (85)	Marvel Stadium (crowd: 22,854)	Report
Saturday, 27 July (7:10 pm)	Port Adelaide 7.13 (55)	def. by	Greater Western Sydney 8.8 (56)	Adelaide Oval (crowd: 27,591)	Report
Sunday, 28 July (1:10 pm)	Western Bulldogs 16.17 (113)	def.	Fremantle 9.12 (66)	Marvel Stadium (crowd: 21,181)	Report
Sunday, 28 July (3:20 pm)	Sydney 12.8 (80)	def. by	Geelong 16.11 (107)	SCG (crowd: 32,911)	Report
Sunday, 28 July (4:40 pm)	Gold Coast 15.6 (96)	def. by	Essendon 15.16 (106)	Metricon Stadium (crowd: 15,759)	Report

=== Round 20 ===
	Round 20
Friday, 2 August (7:50 pm)	North Melbourne 12.14 (86)	def.	Hawthorn 9.10 (64)	Marvel Stadium (crowd: 33,226)	Report
Saturday, 3 August (1:45 pm)	Essendon 9.13 (67)	def. by	Port Adelaide 19.12 (126)	Marvel Stadium (crowd: 42,940)	Report
Saturday, 3 August (2:10 pm)	Greater Western Sydney 12.11 (83)	def.	Sydney 12.9 (81)	GIANTS Stadium (crowd: 16,116)	Report
Saturday, 3 August (2:35 pm)	Fremantle 14.11 (95)	def.	Geelong 9.7 (61)	Optus Stadium (crowd: 36,310)	Report
Saturday, 3 August (7:25 pm)	Melbourne 9.6 (60)	def. by	Richmond 13.15 (93)	MCG (crowd: 37,254)	Report
Saturday, 3 August (7:10 pm)	Adelaide 14.8 (92)	def.	St Kilda 10.10 (70)	Adelaide Oval (crowd: 39,984)	Report
Sunday, 4 August (1:10 pm)	Collingwood 18.12 (120)	def.	Gold Coast 8.3 (51)	MCG (crowd: 33,577)	Report
Sunday, 4 August (3:20 pm)	Carlton 11.9 (75)	def. by	West Coast 15.9 (99)	Marvel Stadium (crowd: 32,802)	Report
Sunday, 4 August (4:40 pm)	Brisbane Lions 14.14 (98)	def.	Western Bulldogs 11.14 (80)	Gabba (crowd: 25,831)	Report

=== Round 21 ===
	Round 21
Friday, 9 August (7:50 pm)	Greater Western Sydney 4.5 (29)	def. by	Hawthorn 13.7 (85)	UNSW Canberra Oval (crowd: 11,741)	Report
Saturday, 10 August (1:45 pm)	Melbourne 7.11 (53)	def. by	Collingwood 10.10 (70)	MCG (crowd: 31,903)	Report
Saturday, 10 August (1:40 pm)	Port Adelaide 15.13 (103)	def.	Sydney 7.14 (56)	Adelaide Oval (crowd: 29,568)	Report
Saturday, 10 August (4:35 pm)	Brisbane Lions 22.12 (144)	def.	Gold Coast 8.5 (53)	Gabba (crowd: 22,530)	Report
Saturday, 10 August (7:25 pm)	Essendon 4.9 (33)	def. by	Western Bulldogs 21.11 (137)	Marvel Stadium (crowd: 41,816)	Report
Saturday, 10 August (7:25 pm)	Geelong 9.15 (69)	def.	North Melbourne 1.8 (14)	GMHBA Stadium (crowd: 21,664)	Report
Sunday, 11 August (1:10 pm)	St Kilda 10.12 (72)	def.	Fremantle 10.9 (69)	Marvel Stadium (crowd: 17,715)	Report
Sunday, 11 August (3:20 pm)	Richmond 11.7 (73)	def.	Carlton 6.9 (45)	MCG (crowd: 51,039)	Report
Sunday, 11 August (3:20 pm)	West Coast 13.12 (90)	def.	Adelaide 12.8 (80)	Optus Stadium (crowd: 54,994)	Report
The match between Greater Western Sydney and Hawthorn was the first match in VFL/AFL history to be played during snowfall.; Greater Western Sydney's final score of 4.5 (29) was the lowest score conceded by Hawthorn since round 12, 1988.; The Brisbane Lions' 91-point win over Gold Coast was the largest winning margin in QClash history.; North Melbourne's final score of 1.8 (14) was the lowest score in the club’s 94 year history, the lowest score recorded by any team since round 15, 2009, the lowest score by any team at GMHBA Stadium and was also the lowest score conceded by Geelong since round 12, 1965.; Essendon suffered its heaviest loss against the Western Bulldogs, losing by 104 points.

=== Round 22 ===
	Round 22
Friday, 16 August (7:50 pm)	Melbourne 5.12 (42)	def. by	Sydney 15.5 (95)	MCG (crowd: 23,700)	Report
Saturday, 17 August (1:45 pm)	Carlton 11.12 (78)	def.	St Kilda 10.8 (68)	MCG (crowd: 51,786)	Report
Saturday, 17 August (2:10 pm)	Brisbane Lions 10.15 (75)	def.	Geelong 10.14 (74)	Gabba (crowd: 35,608)	Report
Saturday, 17 August (4:05 pm)	Adelaide 6.12 (48)	def. by	Collingwood 17.12 (114)	Adelaide Oval (crowd: 48,175)	Report
Saturday, 17 August (7:25 pm)	North Melbourne 22.12 (144)	def.	Port Adelaide 8.10 (58)	Marvel Stadium (crowd: 17,063)	Report
Saturday, 17 August (6:10 pm)	Fremantle 7.13 (55)	def. by	Essendon 13.9 (87)	Optus Stadium (crowd: 47,833)	Report
Sunday, 18 August (1:10 pm)	Richmond 13.10 (88)	def.	West Coast 13.4 (82)	MCG (crowd: 57,415)	Report
Sunday, 18 August (3:20 pm)	Greater Western Sydney 9.11 (65)	def. by	Western Bulldogs 19.12 (126)	GIANTS Stadium (crowd: 10,139)	Report
Sunday, 18 August (4:40 pm)	Hawthorn 18.10 (118)	def.	Gold Coast 7.6 (48)	Marvel Stadium (crowd: 31,331)	Report

=== Round 23 ===
	Round 23
Friday, 23 August (7:50 pm)	Collingwood 10.16 (76)	def.	Essendon 10.5 (65)	MCG (crowd: 85,405)	Report
Saturday, 24 August (1:45 pm)	Sydney 17.7 (109)	def.	St Kilda 8.16 (64)	SCG (crowd: 33,722)	Report
Saturday, 24 August (2:10 pm)	North Melbourne 13.10 (88)	def.	Melbourne 12.11 (83)	Blundstone Arena (crowd: 8,202)	Report
Saturday, 24 August (4:35 pm)	Geelong 19.15 (129)	def.	Carlton 8.13 (61)	GMHBA Stadium (crowd: 31,669)	Report
Saturday, 24 August (7:25 pm)	Gold Coast 7.13 (55)	def. by	Greater Western Sydney 20.7 (127)	Metricon Stadium (crowd: 7,610)	Report
Saturday, 24 August (6:10 pm)	West Coast 9.13 (67)	def. by	Hawthorn 16.9 (105)	Optus Stadium (crowd: 55,859)	Report
Sunday, 25 August (1:10 pm)	Western Bulldogs 18.13 (121)	def.	Adelaide 13.9 (87)	Mars Stadium (crowd: 9,560)	Report
Sunday, 25 August (3:20 pm)	Richmond 12.10 (82)	def.	Brisbane Lions 8.7 (55)	MCG (crowd: 76,995)	Report
Sunday, 25 August (4:10 pm)	Port Adelaide 15.20 (110)	def.	Fremantle 10.7 (67)	Adelaide Oval (crowd: 27,504)	Report
The crowd of 76,995 for the Richmond vs. Brisbane Lions match is the highest attendance for a match between the two sides, and was a then record crowd between a non-Victorian and a Victorian side during the home and away season, surpassed by Collingwood vs. Sydney in 2024.

== Win/loss table ==
Team	1	2	3	4	5	6	7	8	9	10	11	12	13	14	15	16	17	18	19	20	21	22	23	F1	F2	F3	GF	Ladder
Adelaide	**Haw**; **32**	Syd; 26	**Geel**; **24**	NM; 12	**GCS**; **73**	StK; 29	**Frem**; **17**	PA; 20	BL; 1	**WCE**; **12**	Melb; 2	**GWS**; **21**	**Rich**; **33**	X	Geel; 27	**PA**; **57**	GCS; 95	**Ess**; **21**	Carl; 27	**StK**; **22**	WCE; 10	**Coll**; **66**	WB; 34	X	X	X	X	11
Brisbane Lions	**WCE**; **44**	NM; 20	**PA**; **17**	Ess; 47	**Coll**; **62**	GCS; 49	**Syd**; **22**	WB; 16	**Adel**; **1**	Frem; 1	**Haw**; **19**	Carl; 15	X	StK; 56	**Melb**; **33**	GWS; 20	PA; 48	**NM**; **12**	Haw; 27	**WB**; **18**	**GCS**; **91**	**Geel**; **1**	Rich; 27	**Rich**; **47**	**GWS**; **3**	X	X	**2**
Carlton	**Rich**; **33**	PA; 16	**Syd**; **19**	GCS; 2	WB; 44	Haw; 5	**NM**; **58**	**Coll**; **19**	GWS; 93	StK; 13	Ess; 41	**BL**; **15**	**WB**; **3**	X	Frem; 4	**Melb**; **5**	Syd; 7	**GCS**; **24**	**Adel**; **27**	**WCE**; **24**	Rich; 28	**StK**; **10**	Geel; 68	X	X	X	X	16
Collingwood	**Geel**; **7**	Rich; 44	**WCE**; **22**	**WB**; **14**	BL; 62	Ess; 4	**PA**; **39**	Carl; 19	**StK**; **41**	Syd; 7	**Frem**; **4**	**Melb**; **41**	X	WB; 9	**NM**; **44**	Haw; 4	WCE; 1	GWS; 47	**Rich**; **32**	**GCS**; **69**	Melb; 17	Adel; 66	**Ess**; **11**	Geel; 10	X	**GWS**; **4**	X	**4**
Essendon	GWS; 72	**StK**; **11**	Melb; 18	**BL**; **47**	NM; 58	**Coll**; **4**	Geel; 32	Syd; 5	**Frem**; **7**	Rich; 23	**Carl**; **41**	X	**Haw**; **19**	WCE; 35	**GWS**; **6**	**Syd**; **10**	**NM**; **5**	Adel; 21	GCS; 10	**PA**; **59**	**WB**; **104**	Frem; 32	Coll; 11	WCE; 55	X	X	X	**8**
Fremantle	**NM**; **82**	GCS; 3	**StK**; **5**	WCE; 13	GWS; 24	**WB**; **19**	Adel; 17	**Rich**; **25**	Ess; 7	**BL**; **1**	Coll; 4	X	**PA**; **21**	Melb; 14	**Carl**; **4**	**WCE**; **91**	Haw; 31	**Syd**; **1**	WB; 47	**Geel**; **34**	StK; 3	**Ess**; **32**	PA; 43	X	X	X	X	13
Geelong	Coll; 7	**Melb**; **80**	Adel; 24	**GWS**; **4**	Haw; 23	**WCE**; **58**	**Ess**; **32**	NM; 24	**WB**; **44**	GCS; 27	**Syd**; **22**	Rich; 67	X	PA; 11	**Adel**; **27**	WB; 16	**StK**; **27**	**Haw**; **24**	Syd; 27	Frem; 34	**NM**; **55**	BL; 1	**Carl**; **68**	**Coll**; **10**	**WCE**; **20**	Rich; 19	X	**1**
Gold Coast	StK; 1	**Frem**; **3**	WB; 5	**Carl**; **2**	Adel; 73	**BL**; **49**	WCE; 23	**Melb**; **1**	PA; 38	**Geel**; **27**	GWS; 83	**NM**; **26**	**StK**; **4**	X	Syd; 42	**Rich**; **92**	**Adel**; **95**	Carl; 24	**Ess**; **10**	Coll; 69	BL; 91	Haw; 70	**GWS**; **72**	X	X	X	X	18
Greater Western Sydney	**Ess**; **72**	WCE; 52	**Rich**; **49**	Geel; 4	**Frem**; **24**	Syd; 41	**StK**; **44**	Haw; 33	**Carl**; **93**	Melb; 26	**GCS**; **83**	Adel; 21	NM; 23	X	Ess; 6	**BL**; **20**	Rich; 27	**Coll**; **47**	PA; 1	**Syd**; **2**	**Haw**; **56**	**WB**; **61**	GCS; 72	**WB**; **58**	BL; 3	Coll; 4	Rich; 89	**6**
Hawthorn	Adel; 32	**WB**; **19**	**NM**; **16**	StK; 5	**Geel**; **23**	**Carl**; **5**	Melb; 5	**GWS**; **33**	Rich; 36	**PA**; **31**	BL; 19	X	Ess; 19	Syd; 19	**WCE**; **6**	**Coll**; **4**	**Frem**; **31**	Geel; 24	**BL**; **27**	NM; 22	GWS; 56	**GCS**; **70**	WCE; 38	X	X	X	X	9
Melbourne	**PA**; **26**	Geel; 80	**Ess**; **18**	Syd; 22	**StK**; **40**	Rich; 43	**Haw**; **5**	GCS; 1	WCE; 16	**GWS**; **26**	**Adel**; **2**	Coll; 41	X	**Frem**; **14**	BL; 33	Carl; 5	WB; 8	**WCE**; **13**	StK; 19	**Rich**; **33**	**Coll**; **17**	**Syd**; **53**	NM; 5	X	X	X	X	17
North Melbourne	Frem; 82	**BL**; **20**	Haw; 16	**Adel**; **12**	**Ess**; **58**	PA; 16	Carl; 58	**Geel**; **24**	**Syd**; **5**	WB; 25	**Rich**; **37**	GCS; 26	**GWS**; **23**	X	Coll; 44	**StK**; **39**	Ess; 5	BL; 12	WCE; 49	**Haw**; **22**	Geel; 55	**PA**; **86**	**Melb**; **5**	X	X	X	X	12
Port Adelaide	Melb; 26	**Carl**; **16**	BL; 17	**Rich**; **7**	WCE; 42	**NM**; **16**	Coll; 39	**Adel**; **20**	**GCS**; **38**	Haw; 31	StK; 70	X	Frem; 21	**Geel**; **11**	**WB**; **25**	Adel; 57	**BL**; **48**	Rich; 38	**GWS**; **1**	Ess; 59	**Syd**; **47**	NM; 86	**Frem**; **43**	X	X	X	X	10
Richmond	Carl; 33	**Coll**; **44**	GWS; 49	PA; 7	**Syd**; **22**	**Melb**; **43**	WB; 47	Frem; 25	**Haw**; **36**	**Ess**; **23**	NM; 37	**Geel**; **67**	Adel; 33	X	StK; 33	GCS; 92	**GWS**; **27**	**PA**; **38**	Coll; 32	Melb; 33	**Carl**; **28**	**WCE**; **6**	**BL**; **27**	BL; 47	X	**Geel**; **19**	**GWS**; **89**	**3** **(P)**
St Kilda	**GCS**; **1**	Ess; 11	Fre; 5	**Haw**; **5**	Melb; 40	**Adel**; **29**	GWS; 44	**WCE**; **18**	Coll; 41	**Carl**; **13**	**PA**; **70**	X	GCS; 4	**BL**; **56**	**Rich**; **33**	NM; 39	Geel; 27	**WB**; **27**	**Melb**; **19**	Adel; 22	**Frem**; **3**	Carl; 10	Syd; 45	X	X	X	X	14
Sydney	WB; 17	**Adel**; **26**	Carl; 19	**Melb**; **22**	Rich; 22	**GWS**; **41**	BL; 22	**Ess**; **5**	NM; 5	**Coll**; **7**	Geel; 22	**WCE**; **45**	X	**Haw**; **19**	**GCS**; **42**	Ess; 10	**Carl**; **7**	Frem; 1	**Geel**; **27**	GWS; 2	PA; 47	Melb; 53	**StK**; **45**	X	X	X	X	15
West Coast	BL; 44	**GWS**; **52**	Coll; 22	**Frem**; **13**	**PA**; **42**	Geel; 58	**GCS**; **23**	StK; 18	**Melb**; **16**	Adel; 12	**WB**; **61**	Syd; 45	X	**Ess**; **35**	Haw; 6	Frem; 91	**Coll**; **1**	Melb; 13	**NM**; **49**	Carl; 24	**Adel**; **10**	Rich; 6	**Haw**; **38**	**Ess**; **55**	Geel; 20	X	X	**5**
Western Bulldogs	**Syd**; **17**	Haw; 19	**GCS**; **5**	Coll; 14	**Carl**; **44**	Frem; 19	**Rich**; **47**	**BL**; **16**	Geel; 44	**NM**; **25**	WCE; 61	X	Carl; 3	**Coll**; **9**	PA; 25	**Geel**; **16**	**Melb**; **8**	StK; 27	**Frem**; **47**	BL; 18	Ess; 104	GWS; 61	**Adel**; **34**	GWS; 58	X	X	X	**7**
Team	1	2	3	4	5	6	7	8	9	10	11	12	13	14	15	16	17	18	19	20	21	22	23	F1	F2	F3	GF	Ladder

+	Win	Qualified for finals
−	Loss	Eliminated

Bold – Home game
X – Bye
Opponent for round listed above margin

== Ladder ==
Pos	Team	Pld	W	L	D	PF	PA	PP	Pts	Qualification
1	Geelong	22	16	6	0	1984	1462	135.7	64	Finals series
2	Brisbane Lions	22	16	6	0	2004	1694	118.3	64	Finals series
3	Richmond (P)	22	16	6	0	1892	1664	113.7	64	Finals series
4	Collingwood	22	15	7	0	1885	1601	117.7	60	Finals series
5	West Coast	22	15	7	0	1902	1691	112.5	60	Finals series
6	Greater Western Sydney	22	13	9	0	1926	1669	115.4	52	Finals series
7	Western Bulldogs	22	12	10	0	1941	1810	107.2	48	Finals series
8	Essendon	22	12	10	0	1702	1784	95.4	48	Finals series
9	Hawthorn	22	11	11	0	1742	1602	108.7	44	
10	Port Adelaide	22	11	11	0	1806	1714	105.4	44	
11	Adelaide	22	10	12	0	1776	1761	100.9	40	
12	North Melbourne	22	10	12	0	1824	1834	99.5	40	
13	Fremantle	22	9	13	0	1579	1718	91.9	36	
14	St Kilda	22	9	13	0	1645	1961	83.9	36	
15	Sydney	22	8	14	0	1706	1746	97.7	32	
16	Carlton	22	7	15	0	1609	1905	84.5	28	
17	Melbourne	22	5	17	0	1569	1995	78.6	20	
18	Gold Coast	22	3	19	0	1351	2232	60.5	12	

Source: AFL Tables
Rules for classification: 1) points; 2) percentage; 3) number of points for.
(P) Premiers

=== Ladder progression ===
- Numbers highlighted in green indicates the team finished the round inside the top 8.
- Numbers highlighted in blue indicates the team finished in first place on the ladder in that round.
- Numbers highlighted in red indicates the team finished in last place on the ladder in that round.
- Underlined numbers indicates the team had a bye during that round.
- Subscript numbers indicate ladder position at round's end.

	Team	1	2	3	4	5	6	7	8	9	10	11	12	13	14	15	16	17	18	19	20	21	22	23
1	Geelong	4_{8}	8_{1}	12_{1}	12_{1}	16_{1}	20_{1}	24_{1}	28_{1}	32_{1}	36_{1}	40_{1}	44_{1}	44_{1}	44_{1}	48_{1}	48_{1}	52_{1}	52_{1}	56_{1}	56_{1}	60_{1}	60_{2}	64_{1}
2	Brisbane Lions	4_{3}	8_{2}	12_{2}	12_{4}	12_{9}	16_{7}	20_{4}	20_{5}	24_{4}	24_{6}	28_{5}	28_{6}	28_{7}	32_{6}	36_{5}	40_{4}	44_{3}	48_{2}	52_{3}	56_{3}	60_{2}	64_{1}	64_{2}
3	Richmond	4_{5}	4_{13}	4_{14}	8_{13}	12_{10}	16_{8}	16_{9}	20_{6}	24_{5}	28_{4}	28_{6}	28_{7}	28_{8}	28_{9}	32_{7}	36_{6}	40_{5}	44_{5}	48_{4}	52_{4}	56_{4}	60_{4}	64_{3}
4	Collingwood	0_{11}	4_{7}	4_{11}	8_{8}	12_{4}	16_{3}	20_{2}	24_{2}	28_{2}	32_{2}	32_{3}	36_{2}	36_{3}	40_{2}	40_{2}	40_{3}	44_{2}	44_{4}	44_{6}	48_{6}	52_{5}	56_{5}	60_{4}
5	West Coast	0_{16}	4_{10}	8_{6}	12_{3}	12_{8}	12_{12}	16_{10}	20_{7}	24_{6}	28_{5}	32_{4}	32_{4}	32_{5}	36_{4}	40_{3}	44_{2}	44_{4}	48_{3}	52_{2}	56_{2}	60_{3}	60_{3}	60_{5}
6	Greater Western Sydney	4_{1}	4_{8}	8_{4}	12_{2}	12_{6}	16_{4}	20_{3}	20_{4}	24_{3}	28_{3}	32_{2}	32_{3}	36_{2}	36_{3}	36_{4}	36_{5}	36_{6}	40_{6}	44_{5}	48_{5}	48_{6}	48_{6}	52_{6}
7	Western Bulldogs	4_{7}	8_{4}	8_{5}	8_{10}	8_{14}	8_{14}	12_{12}	16_{10}	16_{12}	16_{13}	16_{14}	16_{15}	20_{14}	20_{15}	24_{13}	28_{12}	32_{10}	32_{12}	36_{9}	36_{10}	40_{10}	44_{8}	48_{7}
8	Essendon	0_{18}	0_{17}	4_{15}	8_{12}	12_{7}	12_{10}	12_{11}	12_{13}	16_{10}	16_{12}	20_{10}	20_{10}	24_{10}	24_{10}	28_{10}	32_{9}	36_{8}	40_{7}	44_{7}	44_{7}	44_{7}	48_{7}	48_{8}
9	Hawthorn	4_{4}	4_{9}	8_{7}	8_{9}	8_{13}	12_{11}	12_{13}	16_{9}	16_{11}	20_{9}	20_{11}	20_{11}	20_{12}	20_{12}	20_{15}	24_{13}	28_{11}	32_{10}	32_{11}	32_{12}	36_{11}	40_{9}	44_{9}
10	Port Adelaide	4_{6}	8_{3}	8_{8}	8_{11}	12_{5}	16_{5}	16_{7}	16_{11}	20_{8}	20_{10}	24_{7}	24_{8}	24_{9}	28_{7}	28_{9}	32_{7}	32_{9}	32_{9}	32_{10}	36_{9}	40_{8}	40_{11}	44_{10}
11	Adelaide	0_{15}	4_{12}	4_{13}	4_{14}	8_{12}	12_{9}	16_{6}	20_{3}	20_{7}	20_{7}	24_{8}	28_{5}	32_{4}	32_{5}	32_{6}	32_{8}	36_{7}	36_{8}	36_{8}	40_{8}	40_{9}	40_{10}	40_{11}
12	North Melbourne	0_{17}	0_{16}	0_{17}	4_{17}	4_{18}	4_{17}	8_{15}	8_{17}	8_{17}	12_{14}	16_{13}	20_{12}	20_{13}	20_{13}	24_{11}	28_{10}	28_{12}	28_{13}	28_{14}	32_{13}	32_{14}	36_{12}	40_{12}
13	Fremantle	4_{2}	4_{6}	8_{3}	8_{7}	12_{3}	16_{2}	16_{5}	16_{8}	16_{9}	20_{8}	24_{9}	24_{9}	28_{6}	28_{8}	28_{8}	28_{11}	28_{13}	32_{11}	32_{12}	36_{11}	36_{12}	36_{13}	36_{13}
14	St Kilda	4_{9}	8_{5}	8_{10}	12_{2}	16_{2}	16_{6}	16_{8}	16_{12}	16_{13}	20_{11}	20_{12}	20_{13}	24_{11}	24_{11}	24_{14}	24_{15}	24_{15}	28_{14}	32_{13}	32_{14}	36_{13}	36_{14}	36_{14}
15	Sydney	0_{12}	0_{14}	4_{12}	4_{15}	4_{16}	4_{16}	4_{18}	8_{16}	12_{14}	12_{15}	12_{15}	16_{14}	16_{15}	20_{14}	24_{12}	24_{14}	24_{14}	24_{15}	24_{15}	24_{15}	24_{15}	28_{15}	32_{15}
16	Carlton	0_{14}	0_{15}	0_{16}	0_{18}	4_{15}	4_{15}	4_{17}	4_{18}	4_{18}	4_{18}	4_{18}	8_{18}	8_{18}	8_{18}	12_{17}	12_{17}	16_{17}	20_{16}	24_{16}	24_{16}	24_{16}	28_{16}	28_{16}
17	Melbourne	0_{13}	0_{18}	0_{18}	4_{16}	4_{17}	4_{18}	8_{16}	12_{15}	12_{15}	12_{16}	12_{16}	12_{16}	12_{16}	16_{16}	16_{16}	16_{16}	20_{16}	20_{17}	20_{17}	20_{17}	20_{17}	20_{17}	20_{17}
18	Gold Coast	0_{10}	4_{11}	8_{9}	12_{6}	12_{11}	12_{13}	12_{14}	12_{14}	12_{16}	12_{17}	12_{17}	12_{17}	12_{17}	12_{17}	12_{18}	12_{18}	12_{18}	12_{18}	12_{18}	12_{18}	12_{18}	12_{18}	12_{18}

=== Positions of teams round by round ===
View source data.

== Finals series ==
Qualifying and elimination finals
Sep 6, MCG
1	Geelong	7.9 (51)
4	Collingwood	9.7 (61)
Sep 5, Optus Stadium
5	West Coast	17.14 (116)
8	Essendon	9.7 (61)
Sep 7, Giants Stadium
6	Greater Western Sydney	16.17 (113)
7	Western Bulldogs	8.7 (55)
Sep 7, Gabba
2	Brisbane Lions	8.17 (65)
3	Richmond	18.4 (112)

Semi-finals
Sep 13, MCG
Geelong	13.10 (88)
West Coast	10.8 (68)
Sep 14, Gabba
Brisbane Lions	11.14 (80)
Greater Western Sydney	12.11 (83)

Preliminary finals
Sep 21, MCG
Collingwood	7.10 (52)
Greater Western Sydney	8.8 (56)
Sep 20, MCG
Richmond	12.13 (85)
Geelong	9.12 (66)

Grand final
Sep 28, MCG
Richmond	17.12 (114)
Greater Western Sydney	3.7 (25)

=== Week one ===
	Qualifying finals
QF1: Friday, 6 September (7:50 pm)	Geelong 7.9 (51)	def. by	Collingwood 9.7 (61)	MCG (crowd: 93,436)	Report
QF2: Saturday, 7 September (7:25 pm)	Brisbane Lions 8.17 (65)	def. by	Richmond 18.4 (112)	Gabba (crowd: 37,478)	Report
The crowd of 37,478 for the Brisbane Lions vs Richmond qualifying final at the Gabba is the largest for an AFL match in Queensland.; Richmond won 10 games in a row for the first time since 1980.

	Elimination finals
EF1: Thursday, 5 September (6:10 pm)	West Coast 17.14 (116)	def.	Essendon 9.7 (61)	Optus Stadium (crowd: 59,216)	Report
EF2: Saturday, 7 September (3:20 pm)	Greater Western Sydney 16.17 (113)	def.	Western Bulldogs 8.7 (55)	Giants Stadium (crowd: 19,218)	Report

=== Week two ===
	Semi-finals
SF1: Friday, 13 September (7:50 pm)	Geelong 13.10 (88)	def.	West Coast 10.8 (68)	MCG (crowd: 51,813)	Report
SF2: Saturday, 14 September (7:25 pm)	Brisbane Lions 11.14 (80)	def. by	Greater Western Sydney 12.11 (83)	Gabba (crowd: 30,034)	Report
The Brisbane Lions became the first team to finish in the top two and lose both of their home finals since the current top eight system was introduced in 2000.

=== Week three ===
	Preliminary finals
PF2: Friday, 20 September (7:50 pm)	Richmond 12.13 (85)	def.	Geelong 9.12 (66)	MCG (crowd: 94,423)	Report
PF1: Saturday, 21 September (4:35 pm)	Collingwood 7.10 (52)	def. by	Greater Western Sydney 8.8 (56)	MCG (crowd: 77,828)	Report

=== Week four ===
	Grand final
Saturday, 28 September (2:30 pm)	Richmond 17.12 (114)	def.	Greater Western Sydney 3.7 (25)	MCG (crowd: 100,014)	Report
This is the first appearance in a grand final for Greater Western Sydney.; This was only the second grand final in league history which did not feature either of the top two teams of the home-and-away season. This last occurred in 1980 when Richmond defeated Collingwood.; This is the eighth consecutive year where at least one non-Victorian club has qualified for the grand final. The previous longest streak is seven, set in 2001–2007.; Greater Western Sydney's score of 3.7 (25) was the lowest score in the club's history and the lowest by any team in an AFL grand final since Collingwood's 2.2 (14) in 1960.; Marlion Pickett of Richmond became the first player to debut in a VFL/AFL grand final since Keith Batchelor of Collingwood in 1952.

== Awards ==
=== Major awards ===
- The Norm Smith Medal was awarded to Richmond's Dustin Martin.
- The Brownlow Medal was awarded to Fremantle's Nat Fyfe.
- The Leigh Matthews Trophy was awarded to Carlton's Patrick Cripps.
- The Coleman Medal was awarded to Greater Western Sydney's Jeremy Cameron.
- The Goal of the Year was awarded to Adelaide's Eddie Betts.
- The Mark of the Year was awarded to West Coast's Liam Ryan.
- The AFL Rising Star was awarded to Carlton's Sam Walsh.

=== Coleman Medal ===
- Larger numbers indicate number of goals scored in each round. Subscript numbers indicate total cumulative goals scored through that round.
- Numbers highlighted in blue indicates the player led the Coleman Medal at the end of that round.
- Numbers underlined indicates the player did not play in that round.

	Player	1	2	3	4	5	6	7	8	9	10	11	12	13	14	15	16	17	18	19	20	21	22	23	Total
1	Jeremy Cameron	3_{3}	4_{7}	7_{14}	3_{17}	4_{21}	3_{24}	6_{30}	0_{30}	0_{30}	3_{33}	5_{38}	1_{39}	1_{40}	0_{40}	3_{43}	2_{45}	3_{48}	6_{54}	3_{57}	0_{57}	1_{58}	0_{58}	9_{67}	67
2	Ben Brown	2_{2}	3_{5}	1_{6}	4_{10}	2_{12}	0_{12}	4_{16}	5_{21}	1_{22}	3_{25}	5_{30}	2_{32}	2_{34}	0_{34}	0_{34}	3_{37}	6_{43}	3_{46}	2_{48}	4_{52}	0_{52}	10_{62}	2_{64}	64
3	Tom Lynch	3_{3}	3_{6}	4_{10}	6_{16}	0_{16}	1_{17}	0_{17}	2_{19}	3_{22}	2_{24}	1_{25}	1_{26}	2_{28}	0_{28}	3_{31}	3_{34}	3_{37}	3_{40}	5_{45}	3_{48}	2_{50}	3_{53}	1_{54}	54
3	Charlie Cameron	3_{3}	4_{7}	1_{8}	0_{8}	0_{8}	2_{10}	2_{12}	0_{12}	3_{15}	3_{18}	2_{20}	1_{21}	0_{21}	5_{26}	1_{27}	2_{29}	4_{33}	2_{35}	2_{37}	4_{41}	6_{47}	5_{52}	2_{54}	54
3	Jack Darling	2_{2}	4_{6}	1_{7}	3_{10}	0_{10}	0_{10}	4_{14}	1_{15}	1_{16}	3_{19}	6_{25}	1_{26}	0_{26}	1_{27}	5_{32}	4_{36}	3_{39}	4_{43}	2_{45}	2_{47}	3_{50}	2_{52}	2_{54}	54
6	Tom Hawkins	2_{2}	2_{4}	2_{6}	3_{9}	1_{10}	3_{13}	2_{15}	4_{19}	4_{23}	4_{27}	4_{31}	4_{35}	0_{35}	0_{35}	2_{37}	2_{39}	1_{40}	2_{42}	5_{47}	3_{50}	2_{52}	0_{52}	0_{52}	52
7	Tim Membrey	2_{2}	2_{4}	2_{6}	0_{6}	4_{10}	2_{12}	1_{13}	1_{14}	4_{18}	2_{20}	1_{21}	0_{21}	3_{24}	1_{25}	1_{26}	2_{28}	0_{28}	4_{32}	3_{35}	3_{38}	2_{40}	3_{43}	1_{44}	44
7	Josh Kennedy	0_{0}	1_{1}	3_{4}	3_{7}	1_{8}	2_{10}	2_{12}	2_{14}	4_{18}	3_{21}	3_{24}	3_{27}	0_{27}	3_{30}	0_{30}	0_{30}	0_{30}	2_{32}	7_{39}	1_{40}	1_{41}	1_{42}	2_{44}	44
9	Taylor Walker	0_{0}	1_{1}	1_{2}	1_{3}	3_{6}	4_{10}	1_{11}	2_{13}	3_{16}	0_{16}	1_{17}	2_{19}	3_{22}	0_{22}	1_{23}	2_{25}	3_{28}	1_{29}	3_{32}	4_{36}	2_{38}	0_{38}	5_{43}	43
10	Michael Walters	3_{3}	1_{4}	2_{6}	2_{8}	3_{11}	2_{13}	1_{14}	0_{14}	1_{15}	2_{17}	2_{19}	0_{19}	6_{25}	3_{28}	2_{30}	1_{31}	0_{31}	1_{32}	1_{33}	1_{34}	1_{35}	1_{37}	3_{40}	37

=== Player milestones ===
Name	Club	Milestone	Round
Alex Rance	Richmond	200 AFL games	Round 1
Jack Riewoldt	Richmond	250 AFL games	Round 1
Marc Murphy	Carlton	250 AFL games	Round 1
Robbie Gray	Port Adelaide	200 AFL games	Round 1
Tom Hawkins	Geelong	500 AFL goals	Round 1
Justin Westhoff	Port Adelaide	250 AFL games	Round 2
Shannon Hurn	West Coast	250 AFL games	Round 2
Chris Masten	West Coast	200 AFL games	Round 2
Chris Mayne	Collingwood	200 AFL games	Round 4
Kieren Jack	Sydney	250 AFL games	Round 5
Eddie Betts	Adelaide	300 AFL games	Round 5
David Mundy	Fremantle	300 AFL games	Round 6
Travis Boak	Port Adelaide	250 AFL games	Round 7
Jack Ziebell	North Melbourne	200 AFL games	Round 12
Dale Thomas	Carlton	250 AFL games	Round 13
Ben Cunnington	North Melbourne	200 AFL games	Round 13
Jack Redden	West Coast	200 AFL games	Round 14
Harry Taylor	Geelong	250 AFL games	Round 14
David Zaharakis	Essendon	200 AFL games	Round 15
Luke Breust	Hawthorn	200 AFL games	Round 16
Ben McEvoy	Hawthorn	200 AFL games	Round 16
Daniel Rich	Brisbane Lions	200 AFL games	Round 18
Liam Shiels	Hawthorn	200 AFL games	Round 18
Josh Kennedy	West Coast	600 AFL goals	Round 19
Bachar Houli	Richmond	200 AFL games	Round 19
Heath Shaw	Greater Western Sydney	300 AFL games	Round 19
Tom Hawkins	Geelong	250 AFL games	Round 19
Mitch Duncan	Geelong	200 AFL games	Round 21
Shane Edwards	Richmond	250 AFL games	Round 21
Eddie Betts	Adelaide	600 AFL goals	Round 22
Sam Jacobs	Adelaide	200 AFL games	Round 22
Lance Franklin	Sydney	300 AFL games	Round 23
Isaac Smith	Hawthorn	200 AFL games	Round 23
Luke Shuey	West Coast	200 AFL games	Elimination Final
Scott Pendlebury	Collingwood	300 AFL games	Qualifying Final

=== Best and fairest ===
Club	Award name	Player
Adelaide	Malcolm Blight Medal	Brad Crouch
Brisbane Lions	Merrett–Murray Medal	Lachie Neale
Carlton	John Nicholls Medal	Patrick Cripps
Collingwood	Copeland Trophy	Brodie Grundy
Essendon	W. S. Crichton Medal	Zach Merrett
Fremantle	Doig Medal	Nat Fyfe
Geelong	Carji Greeves Medal	Patrick Dangerfield
Gold Coast	Club Champion	Jarrod Witts
Greater Western Sydney	Kevin Sheedy Medal	Tim Taranto
Hawthorn	Peter Crimmins Medal	James Worpel
Melbourne	Keith 'Bluey' Truscott Trophy	Max Gawn & Clayton Oliver
North Melbourne	Syd Barker Medal	Ben Cunnington
Port Adelaide	John Cahill Medal	Travis Boak
Richmond	Jack Dyer Medal	Dion Prestia
St Kilda	Trevor Barker Award	Seb Ross
Sydney	Bob Skilton Medal	Dane Rampe
West Coast	John Worsfold Medal	Luke Shuey
Western Bulldogs	Charles Sutton Medal	Marcus Bontempelli

== Club leadership ==
Club	Coach	Captain(s)	Vice-captain(s)	Leadership group	Ref.
Adelaide	Don Pyke	Rory Sloane; Taylor Walker		Matt Crouch, Richard Douglas, Josh Jenkins, Tom Lynch, Daniel Talia	
Brisbane Lions	Chris Fagan	Dayne Zorko	Harris Andrews	Jarrod Berry, Allen Christensen, Darcy Gardiner, Ryan Lester, Stefan Martin, Lachie Neale	
Carlton	Brendon Bolton (round 1–11); David Teague (round 12–23)	Patrick Cripps; Sam Docherty		Ed Curnow, Marc Murphy, Kade Simpson	
Collingwood	Nathan Buckley	Scott Pendlebury	Steele Sidebottom	Taylor Adams, Lynden Dunn, Jeremy Howe	
Essendon	John Worsfold	Dyson Heppell	Zach Merrett	Joe Daniher, Orazio Fantasia, David Myers	
Fremantle	Ross Lyon (round 1–22); David Hale (round 23)	Nat Fyfe		Reece Conca, Joel Hamling, David Mundy, Alex Pearce, Michael Walters	
Geelong	Chris Scott	Joel Selwood	Mark Blicavs, Patrick Dangerfield	Mitch Duncan, Tom Stewart, Harry Taylor, Zach Tuohy	
Gold Coast	Stuart Dew	David Swallow; Jarrod Witts	Pearce Hanley, Touk Miller	Brayden Fiorini, Jarrod Harbrow, George Horlin-Smith, Alex Sexton	
Greater Western Sydney	Leon Cameron	Phil Davis; Callan Ward	Stephen Coniglio, Josh Kelly	Matt de Boer	
Hawthorn	Alastair Clarkson	Ben Stratton	Jack Gunston	Ben McEvoy, Jaeger O'Meara, Liam Shiels, Isaac Smith	
Melbourne	Simon Goodwin	Nathan Jones; Jack Viney		Max Gawn, Neville Jetta	
North Melbourne	Brad Scott (round 1–10); Rhyce Shaw (round 11–23)	Jack Ziebell	Robbie Tarrant	Shaun Higgins, Jamie Macmillan	
Port Adelaide	Ken Hinkley	Tom Jonas; Ollie Wines	Hamish Hartlett		
Richmond	Damien Hardwick	Trent Cotchin	Alex Rance, Jack Riewoldt	Shane Edwards (interim captain)	
St Kilda	Alan Richardson (round 1–17); Brett Ratten (round 18–23)	Jarryn Geary	Sebastian Ross	Dan Hannebery, Tim Membrey, Dylan Roberton	
Sydney	John Longmire	Josh Kennedy; Luke Parker; Dane Rampe		Isaac Heeney, Jarrad McVeigh, Callum Mills, Tom Papley, Nick Smith	
West Coast	Adam Simpson	Shannon Hurn	Josh Kennedy, Luke Shuey	Andrew Gaff, Jeremy McGovern, Nic Naitanui	
Western Bulldogs	Luke Beveridge	Easton Wood	Marcus Bontempelli	Lachie Hunter, Jason Johannisen, Jackson Trengove, Mitch Wallis	

== Coach changes ==
Coach	Club	Date	Notes	Caretaker	New coach
Brad Scott	North Melbourne	26 May 2019	Offered to step down as part of a strategic review at the club and decided to leave immediately following continued poor on-field performances in 2019.	Rhyce Shaw	Rhyce Shaw
Brendon Bolton	Carlton	3 June 2019	Sacked following continued poor on-field performances in 2019.	David Teague	David Teague
Alan Richardson	St Kilda	16 July 2019	Resigned following the club’s decision not to renew his contract for 2020 following continued poor on-field performances.	Brett Ratten	Brett Ratten
Ross Lyon	Fremantle	20 August 2019	Sacked after Fremantle failed to make finals for a fourth consecutive year.	David Hale	Justin Longmuir
Don Pyke	Adelaide	12 September 2019	Stepped down after regular season, during an external club review following poor on-field results in 2018 and 2019.	—N/a	Matthew Nicks

== Club membership ==
2019 AFL membership figures
Club	Members	Change from 2018	% change from 2018
Adelaide	64,437	▼302	▼0.47%
Brisbane Lions	28,023	▲3,156	▲12.69%
Carlton	64,269	▲8,264	▲14.76%
Collingwood	85,226	▲9,719	▲12.87%
Essendon	84,237	▲4,918	▲6.20%
Fremantle	51,431	▼4,208	▼7.56%
Geelong	65,063	▲1,245	▲1.95%
Gold Coast	13,649	▲1,541	▲12.73%
Greater Western Sydney	30,109	▲4,866	▲19.28%
Hawthorn	81,211	▲909	▲1.13%
Melbourne	52,421	▲8,146	▲18.40%
North Melbourne	42,419	▲1,630	▲4.00%
Port Adelaide	51,951	▼2,435	▼4.48%
Richmond	103,358	▲2,632	▲2.61%
St Kilda	43,038	▼3,263	▼7.05%
Sydney	61,912	▲978	▲1.61%
West Coast	90,445	▲10,155	▲12.65%
Western Bulldogs	44,373	▲1,127	▲2.61%
Total	1,057,572	▲49,078	▲4.87%
