= Australian touch football =

Australian touch football may refer to:

- Rec footy, a non-contact version of Australian rules football
- Touch Aussie Rules, a non-contact version of Australian rules football played in the UK

== See also ==
- Touch rugby, games derived from rugby football in which players touch, rather than tackle, their opponents
- Touch football (rugby league), the formal competitive version of touch rugby
