= Rec footy =

Non-contact version of Australian rules football

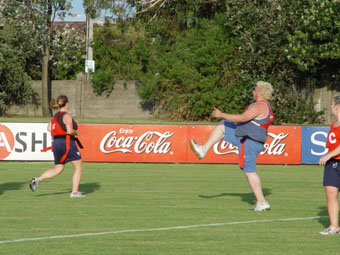
Recreational football

Recreational football (also known as Rec Footy or Recreational Footy) was a non-contact version of the Australian rules football game first played in 2003 and later sanctioned by the Australian Football League's game development arm, and was inspired heavily by the growing popularity of tag rugby (in Australia known as Oztag). It was a more accessible version of Australian rules football that people could pick up and play. It was a mixed competition, with eight players on each team, accessible to players of both sexes, all shapes and sizes and requires minimal equipment to play. Rec Footy was criticised mainly by Australian rules players for appearing similar to netball and being too restrictive, lacking of ability for skilled footballers to run kick and play naturally whilst also penalising newer unskilled players with frequent turnovers.

The AFL ceased promoting Rec Footy in 2011 officially replacing it with AFL 9s in 2016. AFL 9s is essentially similar but rebranded game which responded to many of the criticisms of Rec Footy to make it more similar to the traditional football. The obvious differences are the number of players and the equipment which were not popular aspects of Rec Footy. In AFL 9s tags are no long used in favour of umpiring touch similarly to touch football, bibs were replaced by more traditional football apparel, players are able to move more freely, run and bounce, evade players (with limitations) and kick longer but with specialist goal kickers signified by wrist bands. Maximum participation is encouraged through mixed and gender specific competitions. In mixed competition, female players are distributed across each zone to give players an equal opportunity to kick goals.

== Comparisons with Australian rules football ==
=== Field size, number of players and duration of play ===
Rec Footy teams were much smaller than Australian Rules Football, with two teams of 8. Unlike Australian Rules Football, unlimited number of interchange players were allowed. The field is also much smaller than an Australian Rules Football oval, consisting of a rectangular surface with a maximum length of 100 metres by 50 metres wide. Games were much shorter and do not consist of quarters, with only two 20 minute halves.

=== Rule differences to encourage female participation ===
The game encourages female participation, with a minimum of 3 female players per mixed side. In addition, teams were encouraged to play females in the forward line, with a goal kicked by a female worth 3 more points (9) than a goal kicked by a male player (6). The game is played with a modified Australian rules ball, which is the same size but prevents it from being kicked long distances to suit the reduced ground size and reduce the kicking advantage of males over females.

=== Rule differences to prevent physical contact ===
Unlike Australian rules football, there is no contesting for possession with the exception of removing a player's tag, which substitutes for a tackle and gives the player 3 seconds prior opportunity to dispose of the ball before the holding the ball rule is applied. All one percenters, such as sheparding, blocking, spoiling or smothering were strictly penalised with a free kick. Marking contests were strictly enforced to avoid contact via a drop-zone rule. When any contact is made by an opposition player, a free kick is awarded to the opposition player that is infringed. For deliberate contact, an immediate send-off rule applies and red and yellow cards were shown as in soccer.

=== Other rule differences ===
There is no minimum kick distance for a mark to be paid, although kicking off the ground (or "soccering") is strictly banned. A 15-metre penalty substitutes for a 50-metre penalty. If the ball it disposed of by a player and hits the ground, it is a free kick to the nearest opposition player. Although there is no offside rule in Australian Football, Rec Footy restricts player movement to zones, similarly to netball, and players wear netball like bibs to identify their position on the ground. In order to score from a rebound, the ball must be possessed by a player from each of the three zones, otherwise a free kick is paid to the nearest defender when it reaches the forward line.

Rec Footy positions
Position name	Abbreviation	Number of players	Areas permitted
Forward	F	3 (at least one female for mixed)	Attacking goal third and centre third (can only score from within attacking goal third).
Centre	C	2 (at least one female for mixed)	Anywhere on ground. Cannot score goal.
Back	B	3 (at least one female for mixed)	Defending goal third and centre third. Cannot score goal.

== History ==
The Carter Report titled "Investing in the Future of Australian Football (October 2001)" identified segment gaps in Aussie Rules and its demographic reach. The research found that unlike codes such as rugby league with the successful touch football, Aussie Rules did not have a recreational version of the game to cater for the growing recreational participation market. In the past, the nearest recreational form of the game was the casual pastime of kick-to-kick, rather than an organised team sport. AFL Recreational Football (Recreational Footy or Rec Footy) was developed by the Australian Football League to provide maximum involvement at all levels with a variation of the game that virtually anyone can play. It is often referred to as Auskick for adults and aims to increase participation in women.

The game was originally trialled in Western Australia by the West Australian Football League in 2003. By 2004, the game has grown to 592 players (Western Australia: 34 teams & 344 players; Victoria: 16 teams & 248 players).

In 2005, the game grew quickly, especially in Queensland, and included some summer competitions. In 2006 several new teams began. The sport was played in all Australian states, with a heavy involvement at universities. A small number of Women's Footy teams in the United States also began playing informal games of Recreational Football. 2007 saw a further increase of 160% in terms of players playing Rec Footy.

The AFL ceased promoting Rec Footy in 2011, officially replacing it with AFL 9s in 2016.
