= Farum Australsk Fodbold =

- Full name: Farum Australsk Fodbold
- Founded: 1994 as Farum Lions
- Ground: Lyngholmskolen, Farum
- Chairman: Simon Malone
- Senior Coaches: Troels Ottesen; Morten Engsbye
- League: DAFL
- 2015: DAFL, Premiers (Giants), semi finalists (Cats)

Farum Australsk Fodbold (English: Farum Australian Football) is a club under the Danish Australian Football League. Formed in 1994 as the Farum Lions, the team played their first season of DAFL Premier League 1995 finishing 2nd, after losing the grand final. The next year, the team, called Farum Lions at the time, won the DAFL Premier League. The team has won a total of 8 premierships, aside from 1996, they've also won 2005, 2006, 2007, 2011, 2012, 2013, 2014. They are the only team to win four premierships in a row. The team changed names from the Farum Lions to the Farum Cats after an agreement with AFL club Geelong Cats. In 2015, the club changed name from Farum Cats Australsk Fodboldklub to Farum Australsk Fodbold to be more modern and to indicate that the club now runs two different teams.

== Participation ==
The Farum Cats (and Lions) have competed in the DAFL Premier League every year since 1995. They have also hosted the Farum Local League (later North Zealand Australian Football League) and fielded two teams for the DAFL Sjælland 9's league every year. In 2004 the team fielded both Farum Cats and Farum Lions for the DAFL Premier League and in 2008, they fielded both Farum Cats and the majority of Værløse Bulldogs, a team meant for players playing the national team, but which was unsupported by most of the players from other clubs. The bulldogs folded halfway through the season.

== Lions (1995–2001) ==
In 1994 Jim Campion played for the Copenhagen Crocs, but decided to start his own club in Farum where he lived. The club was named Farum Lions after the Fitzroy moniker Lions, as their guernseys spelled FFC on the front, matching Farum Football Club, as well as the jumpers matching the colors of Farum BK. The club played well in 1995 and reached the Grand Final, but lost the game to Amager Tigers. In 1996, the Lions won the Grand Final against Helsingborg.

== Cats (2002–2012) ==
In 2002 the club changed their name to Farum Cats after reaching an agreement with the Geelong Cats, the favourite club of founder Jim Campion. On March 1, 2012 the club officially changed their name from Farum Australsk Fodboldklub (English: Farum Australian Football Club) to Farum Cats Australsk Fodboldklub, after using the name for several years. The club has won four premierships as the Cats, all of the times they've had exchange students from the Geelong College playing for them (usually two, but in 2011 only 1).

The years as the Cats started out as the years of the Lions had ended, though they won the first game of the year, against the Aalborg Kangaroos, however this was one of only two games the club won that year, and they ended up second last, only better than wooden spooners Helsingborg Saints, who had an abysmal season, finishing with -4 point In 2003, Farum came out of their finals drought (the longest and only in the history of the club, 01-02) After being nearly unbeatable in the newly founded Sjælland Conference, but striking out in the semi-final against later premiers Amager Tigers. In 2004, they split up, forming the Farum Cats, and reviving the Farum Lions. Many of the young players from the junior programme plays for both teams and Morten Engsbye plays his 50th game before he turns eighteen. Only the Cats reach the finals, and in the Grand Final against the NC Cudas, they manage to kick more goals than the opposition. However, they kick 10 behinds less, and finish up losers by just 4 points, after a 5-goal last quarter by Mikkel Norlander. In 2005 the team started an exchange programme with the Geelong College getting 2 players for the duration of the DAFL, these are Rhys Bennet and David Burns-Wallace. The year ends in triumph for the Cats, as they claim their second overall premiership, and David Burns-Wallace wins Best on Ground in the grand final, even though playing most of it with a broken wrist. This was the first of the Farum back to back to back premiership run. The year after, the team is joined by Scott Williams and Scott Witham and they continue the trend of only losing one game of the year. Again, the Beston Ground in the Grand Final is a Geelong boy, this time it's Scott Williams. In 2007, the names of the Geelong boys were John Bailey and Steen Balodis, and they continue the trend of dominating in the DAFL, as Farum claims their third premiership in a row. Mikkel Norlander is leading goalkicker in DAFL and Mikkel Højgård is best 1st year player. David O'Sullivan, another Australian of Farum, is crowned Best on Ground in the Grand Final, crowning of a great year for the Cats. In 2008, the Cats have to cancel the Geelong boys due to lack of funds, and furthermore, the team splits up in the younger Farum Cats, and the better Værløse Bulldogs, a team supposed to be used to bring together the boys for the National Team. However, this team is mostly unsupported by the national players of the other teams, and as a result, a lot of the newly promoted juniors has to play 2 games each weekend - for the second time in 5 years. Halfway through the season Værløse is doing great, while Farum is struggling in last position, and the club decides to fold the Værløse team. Amazingly, after winning the remainder of their games, the Cats goes to the Finals, and end up in the Grand final against Barracudas in Copenhagen. But that is where the fairy tale story ends, as the Cats go down to the Cudas, and finishes runners up. As a result of the split up, the 2 players to play the most DAFL games this year is Nathan Campion and Simon Malone.

== Cats and Giants (2013-present) ==
Before the 2013 season, DAFL changed the format of the competition from 16 aside to 12 aside. For this reason, Farum Cats decided to split up in two teams; Farum Cats, consisting mostly of players residing in Farum and FC Demons, consisting mostly of players who had moved away from Farum. After a good inaugural home and away season, the Demons entered the finals series placed second, but went down to Port Malmö Maulers in the Qualifying Final. In the Preliminary Final, they again lost, this time to the Cats, who had beaten Helsingborg Saints away from home after finishing the home and away season fourth. The Cats went on to win the Grand Final at Limhamnsfältet in Malmö, bringing home the club's second triple premiership.

In 2014 the Demons had none of their glory from 2013, forfeiting no less than half their games, and finishing 5th only above new club Odense. The Cats, however, went through to the Qualifying final by finishing second in the home and away season, again beaten only by Port Malmö. And again, the team from Farum went down in the QF meaning that the Grand Final would be played in Malmö again. The Cats beat Helsingborg in the Preliminary Final, and everything pointed towards another close GF between Port Malmö and Farum Cats. The Cats thought otherwise, and finished impressively, winning the GF 19.12 (126) to 5.11 (41).

Before the 2015 season, FC Demons were close to folding. However, with the addition of Australian Sam Killworth and Aalborg ruckman Rene Pallsgaard, and the added support from Greater Western Sydney Giants who provided new playing kits to the team, they decided to give it a go. The club also changed name from Farum Cats Australsk Fodbold (English: Farum Cats Australian Football Club) to Farum Australsk Fodbold (English: Farum Australian Football). This was done to equalise the status of the two teams within the club more. It was an up and down season for both teams, especially for the Giants who in late June impressively beat the Cats, only to go down crashing against the Barracudas 5 days later. Both teams made it into the finals, however they did it as 3rd and 4th, meaning that with the new two week finals format, the Cats would travel to Aalborg to meet 2nd placed Aalborg, while the Giants would play the "Battle of Copenhagen" against Barracudas in Valby - the same match that they had lost 170-17 earlier on the season. While the Cats went down with two goals to Aalborg, the Giants created history as they beat the Barracudas by a single point in what might just be the biggest surprise in recent DAFL history. A week later, in Aalborg, the history repeated itself, as the Giants, led on by Tim Wilton, came from behind to deny Aalborg their first flag, and claim it for themselves instead.

== Kits and colours ==
=== Cats ===
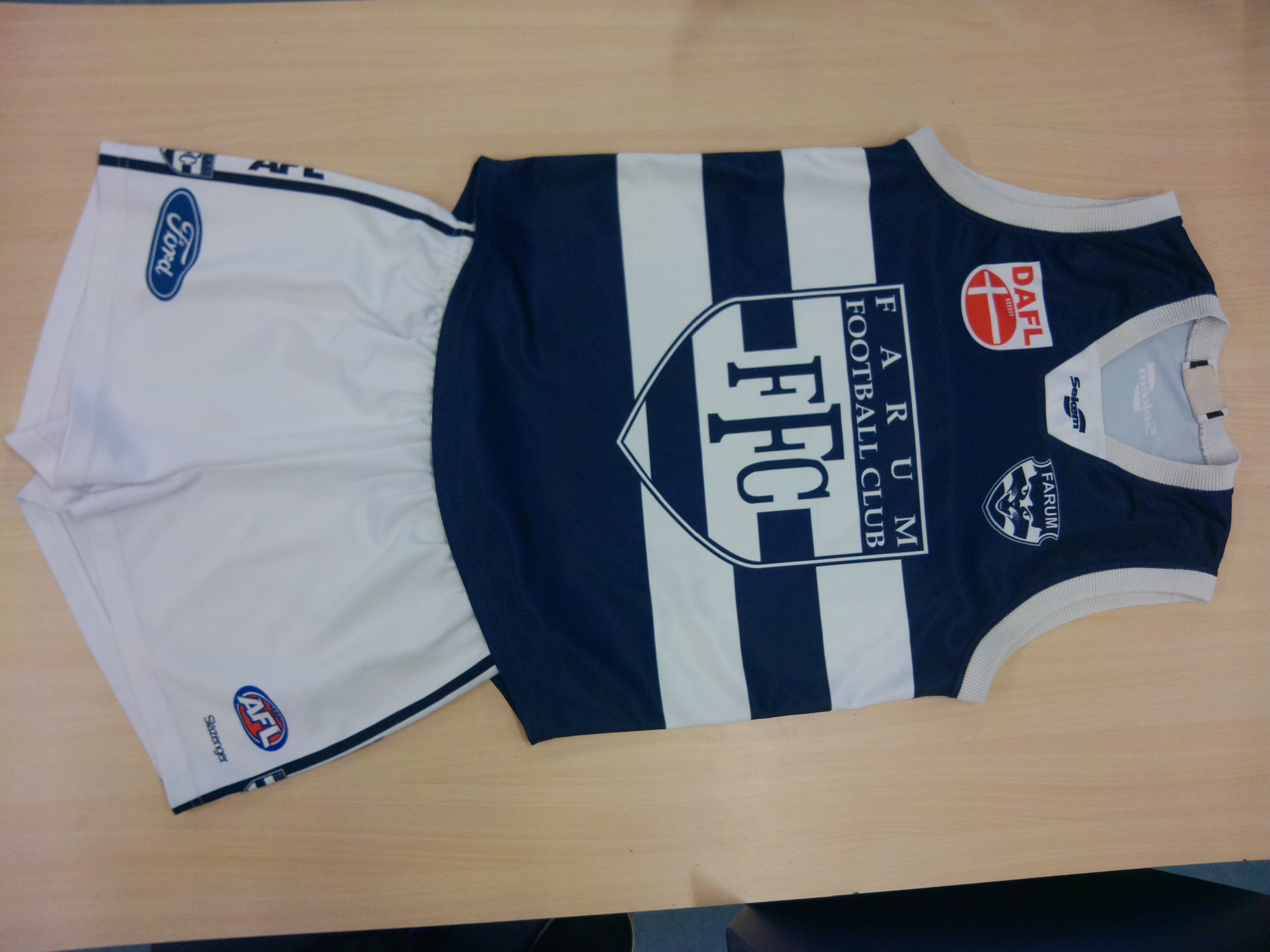
Farum Cats' current kit

When the club was formed as the Lions in 1994, they decided to use the jumpers worn by Fitzroy Football Club in the AFL. This was for two reasons: firstly the colours more or less matched those of Farum BK, the local soccer club, and it was believed that that might have gotten them some financial help from the club later, and secondly, the Fitzroy jumpers had the lettering FFC on the front, matching the name Farum Football Club. Later, newer Lions jumpers were used, and these had a lion on the front, with the name Farum underneath. In 2002 Farum Cats changed their moniker from Lions to Cats, and got a shipment of jumpers from Geelong Cats. They were greyish silver with the GFC shield of the Geelong Football Club on Farum Cats lungs and on the stomach. These were used during Farum's greatest reign in the DAFL, Cats when they won back-to-back-to-back premierships. At the time, the club also used a modified version of the GFC shield, spelling out FFC instead. In the 2008 season, the team sold the old jumpers to the players, and started using a new shipment of jumpers from Geelong. These were mainly large to extra large-sized jumpers, with long sleeves in the 2006–07 style Cats clash jumper. Many of the players did not, however, like these jumpers, as sleeveless jumpers were preferred by many, and the few sleeveless jumpers were pretty much always used. These were older, homestyle Cats jumpers from Fila while the others were of the brand Slazenger. In the 2010 final series the team started using their new original Farum Cats jumpers, after wearing different Geelong Cats jumpers since 2002. Their kit is mainly dark blue, with two thick white hoops, and the old FFC shield on the front, with the new one on the upper left, and the old (then current) DAFL shield on the upper right. The only cooperate name visible is Sekem, the manufacturer.

=== Giants ===
In 2013 and 2014 the then FC Demons played in generic kits resembling those of Melbourne Demons in the AFL. In the 2015 season, they wore new kits gifted by Greater Western Sydney Giants. The new kits are an old clash kit of the Giants: white with orange and gray trims and a black Giants logo on the front.

== Honorary members and other significant personnel ==
The club has three honorary members: Christian Birkholm Jacobsen, better known as Dumbo, founder Jim Campion and former player and long time treasurer Peter Malone. Other significant personnel include creator of The Footy Record Ian Hill, former coach Chris Little, power forward Mikkel Norlander and Mr. Football Morten Engsbye. The club has one Hall of Fame member: founder, long-time player and coach Jim Campion.

== Records ==
From DAFL's website and Farum Cats website

=== DAFL Premiers ===
- 1996 (Farum Lions)
- 2005 (Farum Cats)
- 2006 (Farum Cats)
- 2007 (Farum Cats)
- 2011 (Farum Cats)
- 2012 (Farum Cats)
- 2013 (Farum Cats)
- 2014 (Farum Cats)
- 2015 (Copenhagen Giants)
- 2016 (Farum Cats)
- 2018 (Copenhagen Giants)
- 2019 (Farum Cats)
- 2021 (Farum Cats)
- 2023 (Farum Cats)

=== DAFL runners-up ===
- 1995
- 1997
- 1998
- 2004
- 2008
- 2010
- 2017
- 2018
- 2020 - Final not played due to Covid
- 2022
