= Forceback =

Force Back, Force 'em back, Force Them Back, Forcing Back, Forcey Backs or Forcings Back is a game played by students, particularly in Australia and New Zealand, at lunch or recess. It is played with football (typically oblique spheroid shaped or sometimes round). Some skills that are improved in this are kicking, aim, distance control, running and catching. The rules are usually modified by students themselves, depending on what environment they are playing on.

While there are no standard rules, the game is increasingly codified and endorsed as a recreational school-age game by various sports bodies, including rugby junior development, particularly the NSW School Sport and AFL New Zealand but also both rugby and Australian Football.

== Origins ==
The origin of the pastime is not known, but it is believed to have originated with informal kick-to-kick, rewarding players with longer kicks which are more common in varieties of football common in Australia and New Zealand including Australian rules football and rugby.

== Rules ==
Generally accepted rules:

- The goal of Force Back is to kick the ball down the field towards the opposition's goal line.
- A point is scored when the ball bounces over the back line, not if it goes over on the full.
- If a player catches a kick on the full, their team can advance three or five paces, depending on local rules.
- In some locations, first team with 10 points on the board wins. Often, though, the game is played until the lunch or recess bell signals the end of the break, or until the players agree the game is over.
