= Danish Australian Football League =

New DAFL Logo as of 2012

The Dansk Australsk Fodbold Liga (Eng: Danish Australian Football League) is the controlling body and main league for the sport of Australian rules football in Denmark. Founded in 1989, regular competition commenced in 1991. Despite being predominantly Danish, the league includes clubs in Scania (Swedish: Skåne, southernmost region of Sweden).

== Participation ==
DAFL is often considered the largest and most successful Australian Rules football competition outside the English speaking world with hundreds of participants playing on tailor-made ovals each weekend across the country. In 2013 Aksel Bang, a product of the DAFL, accepted an international scholarship from AFL club Greater Western Sydney giants.

== History ==
In 1989 Mick Sitch (cousin of Rob Sitch) placed an advertisement in a Danish newspaper asking if there were any interested parties who would like to meet him for a kick-to-kick in Fælledparken, a public park in Copenhagen. In addition to Mick, two other people turned up, a Dane, Robbie Larsen, and Steve McCay were present at the first informal training session, which formed the basis of a future league. In 1990 regular training sessions were held, with numbers swelling to the point where the players split themselves into three groups with the intention of starting a competition the following year.

The foundation clubs of the league were the Amager Tigers, Copenhagen Crocodiles and North Copenhagen Barracudas. Official league play began on June 8, 1991, with North Copenhagen taking on Copenhagen. In 1993, the next team to join the league were the Aalborg Kangaroos, based in northern Jutland and around six hours' travel from Copenhagen, followed in 1994 by the Helsingborg Saints in southern Sweden.

1995 saw two new expansion sides, the Farum Lions forming in the Copenhagen suburbs and a group leaving the Helsingborg Saints to found Sweden's second team, the Lund Bulldogs. Lund folded during the 1995 season, the number of clubs remaining at six until the Århus Bombers join the league in 1997 as the second side in Jutland.

With no new teams since 1997 and player numbers decreasing for the first time, the DAFL restructured its competition in 2003. The concept was based on more games between more (and smaller) teams - with three conferences making up the league. These were to be the Jutland Conference and the Zealand Conference in Denmark and the Scania Conference in Sweden. Clubs would be split into smaller squads and representative sides from the three conferences would play a regional series. The champion sides of each conference would then play a Denmark/Scania wide finals series to determine DAFL premiers.

This format was then reinvented a second time in 2005. Instead of adding a new level above the regular league play, as had been the case in 2003, the new league replaced the regional series with the club-based DAFL Premier League. The Premier League teams in 2007 are the North Copenhagen Barracudas, Farum Cats, Copenhagen Crocodiles, Jutland Shinboners, Port Malmö Maulers and the South Sweden Saints. Sides in the Premier League draw their players from four local leagues, based on North Zealand, Copenhagen, Jutland and Scania.

In 2011, prior to the 2012 season, the DAFL constitution was rewritten, changing the way DAFL is run. DAFL now has a board and they put down a league committee to run the actual league. This is to free up time for the board to focus on spreading knowledge of Australian Rules Football. The committee has a member from each club in the league, while the board has four members; a president, a vice president, a cashier and an Elite Committee President, who as the title suggests is the president of the DAFL Elite Committee, who is responsible for the Danish national team as well as tryouts for European teams.

The current (2015) president is Simon Malone. The vice president is Gavin Ward, the treasurer is Laszlo Peter Horvath and the Elite and Development Committee President is Morten Merhøj. In 2016 Maria Falkesgaard Jørgensen will replace Gavin Ward as vice president and Frederik Bøgeskov Schmidt will replace Laszlo Peter Horwath as treasurer

The teams that competed in the 2015 DAFL Premier League were Aalborg Kangaroos, Port Malmö Mailers, Copenhagen Barracudas, Copenhagen Giants, Odense Lions and reigning premiers Farum Cats. This brings the total number of teams to 6, 1 less than 2014 with the withdrawal of Helsingborg Saints. Copenhagen Giants won their first flag, coming into the finals placed fourth (due to better percentage than Port Malmö Maulers) and beating Aalborg Kangaroos in the Grand Final.

== Clubs ==
=== Jutland ===
Currently, two teams are active in Jutland: Aalborg Kangaroos, playing in green and gold and Aarhus Bombers in Black and Red. The Aalborg Kangaroos were formed in 1993, the first DAFL club outside Copenhagen and lasted until 2003, when with the DAFL league restructure, the Aalborg club created two squads, the Kangaroos and the Power for the newly formed Jutland Conference. From 2005 they were a feeder club for the Jutland Shinboners until 2013, when they reentered DAFL Premier League as their own unit, changing outfits from the classic blue and white Kangaroos guernseys to the current custom made green and gold.

The Aarhus Bombers were formed in 1997 and while defunct in the period 2010-2020 it was revived for the 2020 season.

Both Aarhus Bombers and Aalborg Kangaroos are competing as the Jutland Shinboners, and have been since 2024.

The other existing DAFL membership club in Jutland is the Randers Dockers. Randers competed as their own team in the 2013 DAFL Premier League, but had to withdraw late for the 2014 season. Randers is still a membership club of DAFL, but are not competing in the 2015 Premier League. Randers historically played in white guernseys with a purple anchor from Fremantle Dockers.

=== Funen ===
The sole team from Funen is the Odense Lions. Formed in 2012 by former Farum Cats player Morten Merhøj and Australian Daniel Petrolo, Odense competed in DAFL Premier League for the first time in 2014, after some of their players were registered to play for Randers the year before. Odense plays custom made in red/burgundy, blue and gold.

=== Zealand ===
There are currently three teams from Zealand in the DAFL Premier League, the Farum Cats, the Copenhagen Barracudas and the Copenhagen Giants.

The club in Farum, originally dubbed the Lions, formed in late 1994, joining the DAFL for the 1995 season. They reached the grand final in every one of their first four seasons, although they only won the premiership in 1996. Farum have had an active junior department program since 1998, with half of the current senior players originally coming to the club as juniors. A partnership arrangement with the Geelong Football Club of the Australian Football League saw the club change its name and playing strip to match that of the Geelong club, and send senior and regular junior sides on tours of Australia. Farum is the most successful club in DAFL history, winning the Premier League a total of 8 times; in 1996, then three years running in 2005-2007 and every year since 2011. The current streak (4 years) is also a DAFL record. Farum plays in custom made navy blue and white guernseys with the old club shield on the stomach and the newer on the chest. It also shows the old DAFL logo on the chest. Since 2013, Farum Cats have been one of two teams under Farum Cats Australsk Fodboldklub (the other being FC Demons). In 2015, the Farum Cats Australsk Fodboldklub changed name to Farum Australsk Fodbold to accommodate also having a second team (being renamed Copenhagen Giants for the 2015 season). Since 2013, Troels Ottesen has coached and Thore Lauritzen has captained the team.

The Copenhagen Giants (formerly FC Demons) is a team under Farum Australsk Fodbold, based largely in Copenhagen but with home ground in Farum. The team was formed for the 2013 (when DAFL switched from 16 aside to 12 aside) season as a team for the Farum Cats players that had moved to Copenhagen. They were named FC Demons for the first two seasons, and achieved mixed success. In the first season they reached the finals after finishing in second place, but lost both their final games to Port Malmö and Farum. In their second season they were hit by injuries and lack of numbers, and forfeited half their games - making it an abysmal season. At the end of the season, there were talks about folding the team, but the team got rejuvenated energy and a few new players and decided to continue. During the winter a deal was made with Greater Western Sydney Giants which saw the team change name to Copenhagen Giants and as return they received a set of guernseys from them. The team now plays in GWS Giants clash guernseys (white with a dark grey G and orange borders). Since the beginning in 2013, the team has been coached by Morten Engsbye and captained by Simon Malone.

The Copenhagen Barracudas is the sole team fielded in the Premier League by Copenhagen Australian Football - the club founded from the three founding Copenhagen clubs. Copenhagen Australian Football was founded in 2014, effectively joining North Copenhagen Barracudas with the Copenhagen X-Men - who had players from Amager Tigers and Copenhagen Crocs. The Barracudas play in custom made guernseys based on the colours of Adelaide Crows with their insignia on the front.

== Former clubs and teams ==
The North Copenhagen Barracudas were a foundation club of the DAFL, playing in every season since the league started in 1991. After the 2003 league restructure, the club fielded two senior sides, the Barras and the Cudas. After the 2005 restructure, the club fielded the Barracudas team in the DAFL Premier League and two squads in the Copenhagen local league until 2014.

The Copenhagen Crocs were also a foundation club of the Danish Australian Football League and have played (in some form) in every season of the DAFL since it began in 1991. With the league restructure in 2005, the Crocs fielded a combined side with the Amager Tigers in the DAFL Premier League, dubbed the Copenhagen Hawks. The Crocs traditionally wore the colours of the Carlton Blues from the AFL. The Crocodiles returned to the Premier League in 2006. The Copenhagen Crocs are now part of Copenhagen Australian Football

The Amager Tigers, based in Amager in the southern Copenhagen urban area, were formed as the third foundation club of the DAFL, competing in every season (in some form) from 1991 to 2005. The Tigers had the most successful premiership record of any club in the DAFL, however they often struggled for year-to-year consistency, with premiership years followed by a finish near the bottom of the ladder. After the 2005 DAFL restructure, Amager fielded a combined side with the Copenhagen Crocodiles for play in the DAFL Premier League, to be named the Copenhagen Hawks. In early 2006 they announced that they would not field any teams that season, but may do so again in future. As of 2014 they are now a part of Copenhagen Australian Football.

East Coast Bulldogs was a newer team in the DAFL based in Greve, who never entered the Premier League, but played in DAFL Sjælland 9's. The club was founded by formed Farum player Gavin Hollingworth but was folded due to lack of time and playerbase.

=== Scania ===
Due to its proximity to Denmark, the region of Scania in southern Sweden has fielded teams in DAFL Premier League for many years. Over the years they've had Port Malmö, Helsingborg, Southern Sweden and Lund. Currently only the Port Malmö Maulers compete in Premier League after Helsingborg Saints withdrew for the 2015 season to focus on AFL Sweden. Helsingborg have however confirmed that they will return to DAFL for the 2016 season.

== National team ==
Denmark's national representative team are known as the Vikings. They have played a number of international fixtures dating back to the 1990s.

They competed in the Australian Football International Cup in Melbourne, finishing a respectable fourth behind Ireland, Papua New Guinea and New Zealand. The Vikings withdrew from the 2005 International Cup due to lack of funds, although they returned to the 2008 International Cup.

In 2014 and 2015 the Vikings have won back to back AFL Europe Euro Cup victories, after finishing as runners up in 2012.

== Premiers ==
Year	Premier	Runner up	Campion Medalist*
1991	North Copenhagen Barracudas	Copenhagen Crocodiles	Justin Bourke (Cop)
1992	Amager Tigers	Copenhagen Crocodiles	Clayton Coleman (Cop)
1993	Amager Tigers	Copenhagen Crocodiles	Mark Guthrie (Cop)
1994	Copenhagen Crocodiles	Amager Tigers	Jim Campion (Cop)
1995	Amager Tigers	Farum Lions	John Cawley (Am)
1996	Farum Lions	Helsingborg Saints	Jim Campion (Far)
1997	Amager Tigers	Farum Lions	Peter McDonald (Am)
1998	Copenhagen Crocodiles	Farum Lions	Clayton Coleman (Cop)
1999	Copenhagen Crocodiles	North Copenhagen Barracudas	Aaron Ravenarki (Cop)
2000	North Copenhagen Barracudas	Amager Tigers	Mads Brinks (NC)
2001	North Copenhagen Barracudas	Amager Tigers	Mogens Hansen (NC)
2002	Amager Tigers	North Copenhagen Barracudas	Michael Neugebauer (Am)
2003	Amager Tigers	NC Barras	Matthias Øllgaard (Am)
2004	NC Cudas	Farum Cats	Jesper Gjørup (NCC)
2005	Farum Cats	South Sweden Saints	David Burns-Wallace (Far)
2006	Farum Cats	Jutland Shinboners	Scott Williams (Far)
2007	Farum Cats	Port Malmö Maulers	David O'Sullivan (Far)
2008	North Copenhagen Barracudas	Farum Cats	Jesper Gjørup (NC)
2009	Port Malmö Maulers	North Copenhagen Barracudas	Mark Henryon (NC)
2010	North Copenhagen Barracudas	Farum Cats	Nick Ingall (NC)
2011	Farum Cats	Port Malmö Maulers	Chris Campion (Far)
2012	Farum Cats	North Copenhagen Barracudas	Mikkel Norlander (Far)
2013	Farum Cats	Port Malmö Maulers	William Andersen (Far)
2014	Farum Cats	Port Malmö Maulers	Mikkel Kjøge (Far)
2015	Copenhagen Giants	Aalborg Kangaroos	Tim Wilton (CG)
2016	Farum Cats	Copenhagen Barracudas	Thore Lauritzen (Far)
2017	Copenhagen Barracudas	Farum Cats	Atiba Jackson (CB)
2018	Copenhagen Giants	Farum Cats	Chris Campion (CG)
2019	Farum Cats	Odense Lions	Mikkel Kjøge (Far)
2020	Copenhagen Barracudas	Farum Cats	Grand Final not played due to Covid
2021	Farum Cats	Barracudas Gold	William Andersen (Far)
2022	Copenhagen Barracudas	Farum Cats	Mikkel Kjøge (Far)

* Best on ground in Grand Final

== Sitch Medallists (Best & Fairest) ==
- 1991 Kim Madsen (Amager)
- 1992 Aaron Ravenarki (Copenhagen)
- 1993 Ian Moore (North Copenhagen)
- 1994 Rick Ellis (Amager)
- 1995 Jesper Gjørup (Aalborg)
- 1996 Jesper Gjørup (Aalborg)
- 1997 Shaun Hawking (Amager)
- 1998 Mogens Hansen (North Copenhagen)
- 1999 Duncan Milward (Aalborg)
- 2000 Andreas Svensson (Helsingborg)
- 2001 Andreas Svensson (Helsingborg)
- 2002 Andreas Svensson (Helsingborg)
- 2003 Páll Tómas Finnsson (Aalborg Kangaroos)
- 2004 Mogens Hansen (North Copenhagen Cudas)
- 2005 Frederik Schulin (Jutland)
- 2006 Christian Rose (Farum)
- 2007 Tim Feldtmann (North Copenhagen)
- 2008 Tim Feldtmann (North Copenhagen)
- 2009 Steve Wood (North Copenhagen)
- 2010 Nick Ingall (North Copenhagen)
- 2011 James Coumans (Farum)
- 2012 Mathias Biron (Farum)
- 2013 Troels Ottesen (Farum)
- 2014 Aksel Bang (Aalborg)
- 2015 Aksel Bang (Aalborg)
- 2016 William Andersen (Farum)
- 2017 Thore Lauritzen (Farum)
- 2018 Aksel Bang (Aalborg)
- 2019 Mikkel Kjøge (Farum)
- 2020 William Andersen (Farum) and Chris Campion (Farum)

== See also ==
- List of Australian rules football leagues outside Australia
