= 2019 AFLX tournament =

The 2019 AFL X tournament was the second and latter of the Australian Football League (AFL) pre-season series of matches played under the laws of AFLX, a variation of Australian rules football. The tournament took place on 22 February 2019 at Marvel Stadium.

== Background ==
The league abandoned the AFLX tournament format adopted for the inaugural series, which featured all 18 AFL clubs, and instead appointed four high-profile players as captains of their respective teams. Geelong midfielder and Brownlow Medallist Patrick Dangerfield captained the Bolts, Fremantle captain and fellow Brownlow winner Nat Fyfe captained the Flyers, Adelaide forward Eddie Betts captained the Deadlys, and Richmond forward and three-time Coleman Medallist Jack Riewoldt captained the Rampage. Teams were live-drafted from a pool of available players by the captains, although by pre-agreement the Deadlys team was drawn entirely from Indigenous players. The teams had 14 players each, with eight on the field and six on the bench.

=== Rule changes ===
A new rule was added to the competition in which teams could nominate one of their players on the field to be the Gatorade Game Changer for the last five minutes of the game. The value of a behind, goal, or super goal scored by a Game Changer would be twice as much as it would for any other player, making them worth two, twelve, and twenty points, respectively.

== Draft ==
A draft of 48 selections was broadcast on Wednesday 6 February by Network Seven and Fox Footy after being held in secret the previous day.

The draft featured 12 selections by each captain with a snake draft order determined by random draw on the night of the draft. No more than four players from each AFL club, inclusive of the pre-selected captains and vice-captains, were eligible to play in the tournament.

=== Teams ===
Bolts
Name	Club
Patrick Dangerfield (c)	Geelong
Luke Hodge (vc)	Brisbane Lions
Tom Hawkins	Geelong
Steele Sidebottom	Collingwood
Mark Blicavs	Geelong
Tom Rockliff	Port Adelaide
Andrew Gaff	West Coast
Luke Parker	Sydney
Jaidyn Stephenson	Collingwood
Andrew McGrath	Essendon
Jack Billings	St Kilda
Daniel Rich	Brisbane Lions
Robbie Tarrant	North Melbourne
Jack Steele	St Kilda

Rampage
Name	Club
Jack Riewoldt (c)	Richmond
Patrick Cripps (vc)	Carlton
Lachie Whitfield	Greater Western Sydney
Rory Sloane	Adelaide
Phil Davis	Greater Western Sydney
Dayne Zorko	Brisbane Lions
Isaac Smith	Hawthorn
Luke Breust	Hawthorn
Easton Wood	Western Bulldogs
Bayley Fritsch	Melbourne
Dylan Shiel	Essendon
Shaun Higgins	North Melbourne
Tim Membrey	St Kilda
Zac Fisher	Carlton

Flyers
Name	Club
Nat Fyfe (c)	Fremantle
Marcus Bontempelli (vc)	Western Bulldogs
Scott Pendlebury	Collingwood
Alex Rance	Richmond
Callan Ward	Greater Western Sydney
Isaac Heeney	Sydney
Stephen Coniglio	Greater Western Sydney
Rory Laird	Adelaide
Travis Boak	Port Adelaide
Lachie Hunter	Western Bulldogs
Aliir Aliir	Sydney
Michael Hurley	Essendon
Josh Kennedy	Sydney
Jack Higgins	Richmond

Deadly
Name	Club
Eddie Betts (c)	Adelaide
Shaun Burgoyne (vc)	Hawthorn
Bradley Hill	Fremantle
Jarrod Harbrow	Gold Coast
Tim Kelly	Geelong
Jack Martin	Gold Coast
Travis Varcoe	Collingwood
Lewis Jetta	West Coast
Anthony McDonald-Tipungwuti	Essendon
Nathan Wilson	Fremantle
Willie Rioli	West Coast
Sam Powell-Pepper	Port Adelaide
Cam Ellis-Yolmen	Adelaide
Jade Gresham	St Kilda

==== Notes ====
1.Replaced Robbie Gray, who withdrew due to injury.
2.Replaced Chad Wingard, who withdrew due to injury.
3.Replaced Joel Hamling, who withdrew due to injury.
4.Replaced Steven May, who withdrew due to injury.
5.Replaced Jeremy Cameron, who withdrew due to injury.

== Results ==
=== Round Robin ===
The tournament took place at Marvel Stadium on 22 February 2019 beginning at 7:00pm.

Instead of a coin toss, a nominated player from each team competed in rock paper scissors to decide which end the teams would kick to.

==== Ladder ====
Team	Pld	W	D	L	PF	PA	PD	Pts
Flyers	3	2	0	1	217	181	36	8
Rampage	3	2	0	1	223	196	27	8
Bolts	3	1	0	2	173	198	-25	4
Deadly	3	1	0	2	175	213	-38	4

==== Matches ====
	Results
Friday, 22 February 7:10pm	Bolts 52	def. by	Rampage 72	Marvel Stadium
Friday, 22 February 7:37pm	Bolts 45	def.	Deadly 39	Marvel Stadium
Friday, 22 February 8:04pm	Deadly 38	def. by	Flyers 84	Marvel Stadium
Friday, 22 February 8:31pm	Rampage 67	def.	Flyers 46	Marvel Stadium
Friday, 22 February 8:58pm	Rampage 84	def. by	Deadly 98	Marvel Stadium
Friday, 22 February 9:25pm	Bolts 76	def. by	Flyers 87	Marvel Stadium

=== Grand Final ===
	Result
Friday, 22 February 9:57pm	Rampage 84	def.	Flyers 67	Marvel Stadium (crowd: 23,828)

In the grand final, Patrick Cripps (Rampage) humorously kicked a goal with a place kick, with Jack Riewoldt serving as holder in the style of a gridiron football field goal attempt. Place kicking (off the ground, rather than with a holder) had been obsolete in Australian rules football since the 1950s.
