= Variations of Australian rules football =

There are a number of games or activities based on or similar to the game of Australian rules football, in which the player uses common Australian rules football skills. They range in player numbers from 2 (in the case of kick-to-kick) up to the minimum 38 required for a full Australian rules football.

== Participatory varieties ==
=== Auskick ===
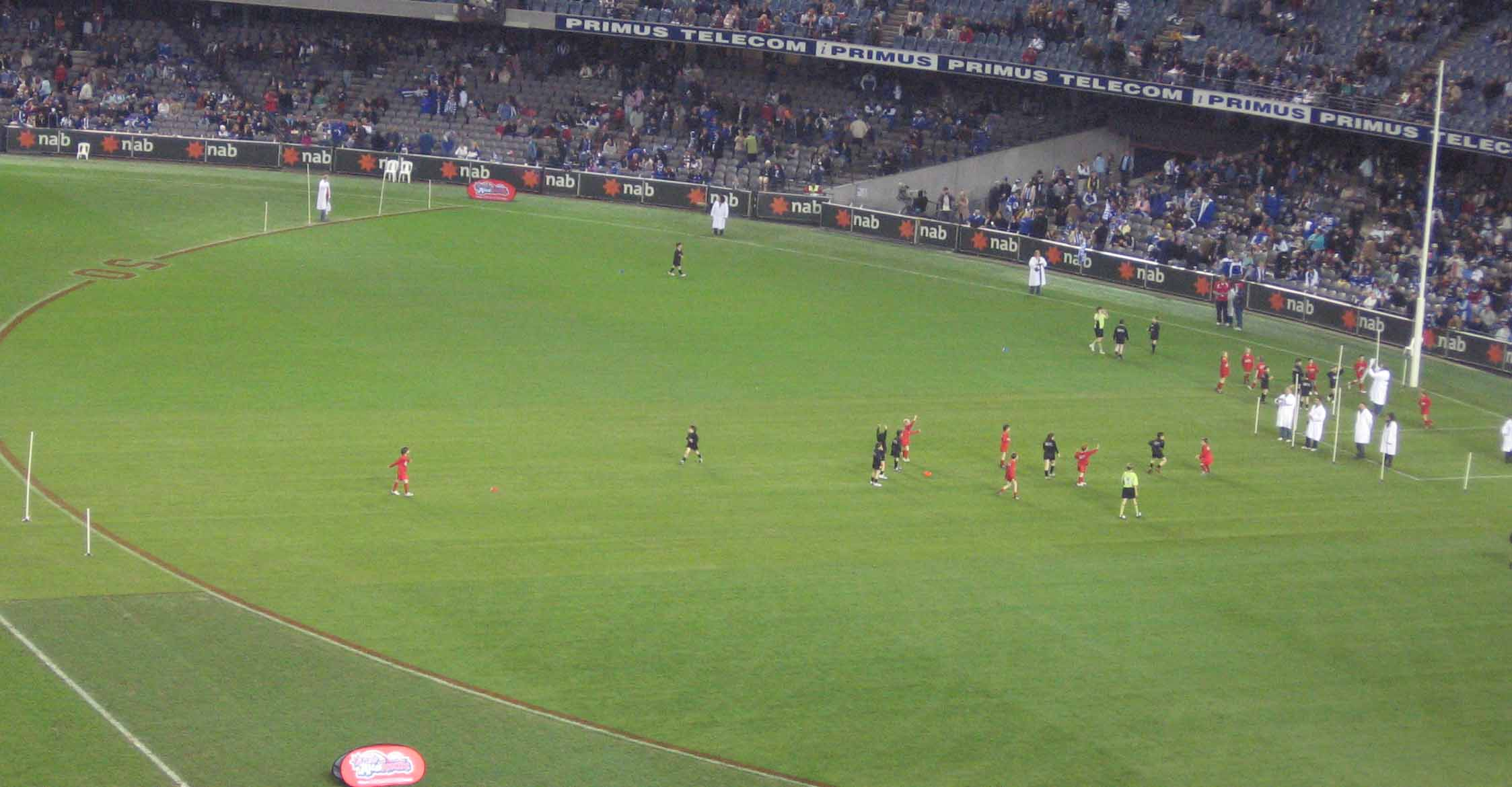
Auskick taking place during the half-time break of an AFL game at Telstra Dome

Auskick is a program developed in Australia in the 1980s and promote participation in Australian rules football amongst children, particularly of primary school age and under. It has proven to be popular with both boys and girls. At its peak in the mid-1990s there were around 200,000 Auskick participants annually. The program is now run throughout the world, including several locally branded variations such as: "Kiwi Kick" (AFL New Zealand), "Niukick" (Papua New Guinea), "Footy Wild" (South Africa), "Bula Kick" (Fiji), "Viking Kick" (Denmark) and "Ausball" (United States) among others.

Auskick has its roots in the Little League which began to be played at half time during VFL matches in the 1960s and was revised in 1980 to make it more accessible. Little League was expanded by Ray Allsop into a state development program called Vickick begun in Victoria in 1985. Urged by former player David Parkin in 1995 as a means of keeping the sport viable long term in the Australian Capital Territory it was adopted by the AFL Commission the national governing body for the sport, which began to roll it out nationally from 1998. Numerous professional players are graduates of the Auskick program.

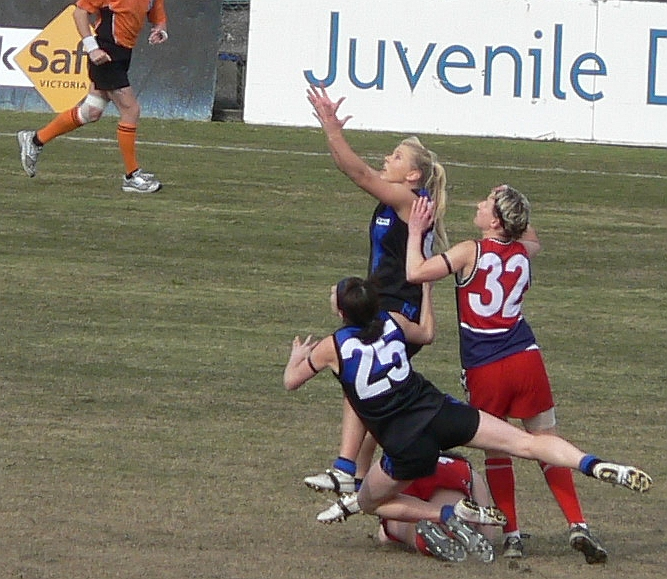
A VWFL match between Melbourne University Mugars and Darebin Falcons

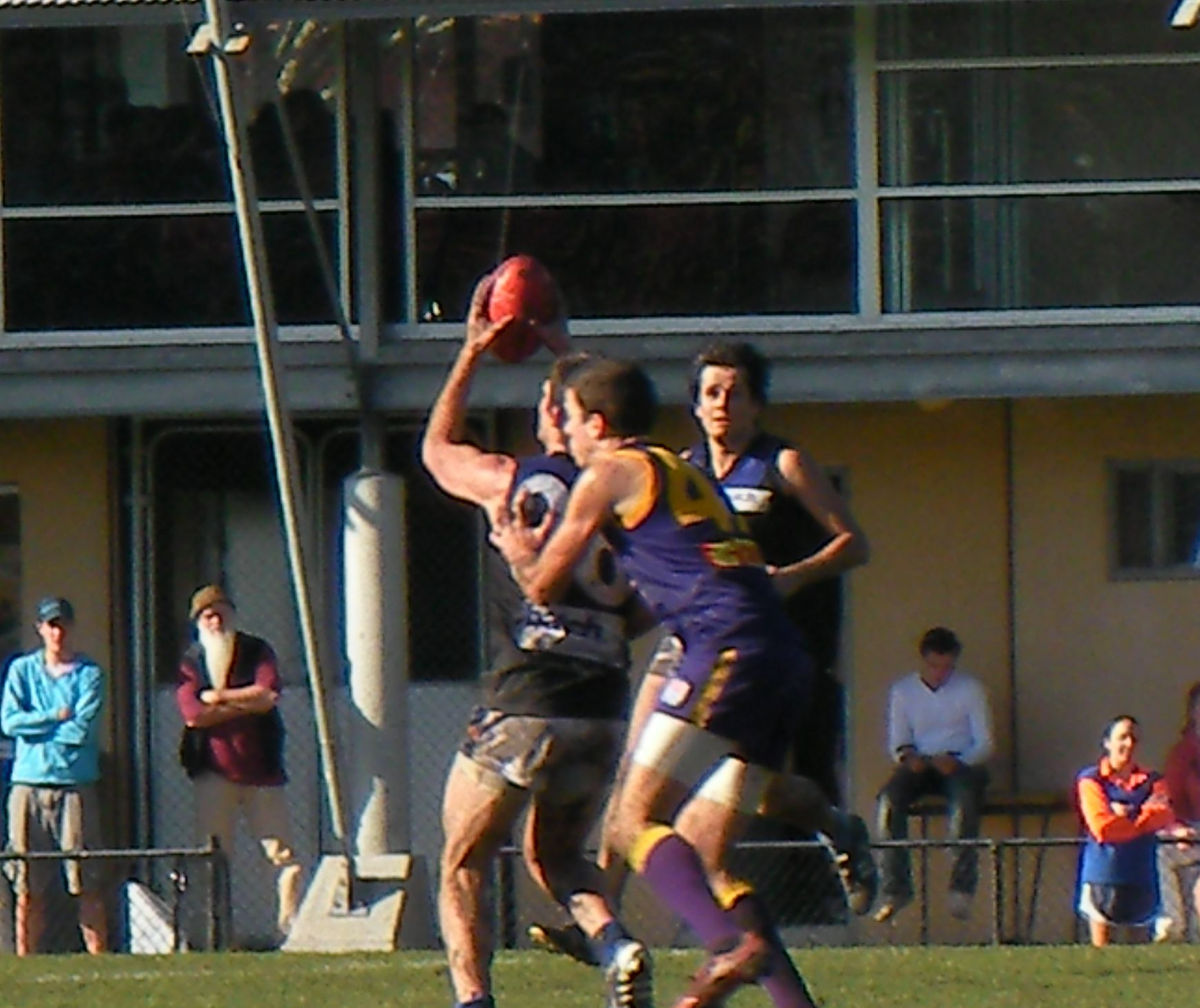
Victorian Amateur Football Association match between Collegians and Melbourne University Blacks

=== Masters Australian Football ===
Masters Australian Football (also known as "Superules" or derisively as "Superfools") is an amateur social variation for players aged 35 years and over. The sport first commenced officially on 21 September 1980 in Ballarat, Victoria. Masters matches are typically classified by age grades: Supers (35+ years); Masters: (40+ years) and Seniors: (45+ years); Super Seniors (50+) and Super Veterans (55+) and some matches either do or don't allow mixing between these age groups. Masters leagues often also incorporate rules from Amateurs football.

The game varies from open age football particular in modifications aimed at reduce the physical impact of the game on older players and reduce the volunteer burden on officials. Umpires do not bounce the ball and there are often no boundary umpires. There are less interchange restrictions and players are not permitted to raise their knees in aerial contests, or make contact with the knee or boot, which could potentially damage the weaker backs of older players.

=== Wheelchair ===
The wheelchair variation of AFL (known as "Wheelchair Aussie Rules" or "Wheelchair AFL") is a parasport designed to play in sports wheelchairs. Kicking is replaced by handballing (a mark is awarded for catching the ball within 3 metres), while handballing is replaced by throwing. Like other varieties tackling is replaced by touching and players are divided into zones. Goals and behinds are used for scoring, however with shorter distances between the posts. There are leagues operating in all states and territories of Australia, with Victorian clubs aligned with AFL clubs, operating since 2018.

== Modified field or player numbers ==
=== AFLX ===
Another prominent variation of the game was AFLX. The game was played on soccer-sized pitches and features seven players a side, as well as several other rules designed to speed up the game.

=== Touchball ===
Touchball (or Touch Footy)—not to be confused with Touch Aussie Rules (a UK variant) or touch football—is an obscure 5-a-side version of Australian rules football rules that was trialled and televised for a limited time in the late 1960s on World of Sport. The game uses a regular Australian rules football and is played on a confined square court with the goals on opposing diagonals.

== Recreational varieties ==
=== AFL Nines ===
AFL Nines is the AFL's official touch nine-a-side footy variant since 2016 addressing many of the criticisms of the earlier Rec Footy, and later, AFLX. It varies from Australian Rules Football mainly in that it is played with 9 players on a smaller field with a smaller ball. The ball must not touch the ground off a handball, marking is protected by a drop-zone and only designated forwards can kick goals. It allows running with the ball (limited to one running bounce) and freedom of movement around the field giving athletes more opportunity to have an impact on the game and compensate for lower skill level of other players. AFL Nines offers mixed, as well as all-male and all-female, competitions to lower the barriers to entry for participation; according to official rules, mixed-gendered games award 9 points to goals scored by female forwards, three more points than all other forwards. As a recreational game AFL Nines has proved popular with both new and established Australian rules players with 24,032 participants in Australia in 2019 at least a third of which are female. Its popularity as a social game with Australian rules players is such that ex-professional players are sometimes seen participating in social competitions.

=== Force Back ===
Force Back (also known as Force 'em back, Force Them Back, Forcing Back, Forcey Backs or Forcings Back) is a game played by school students usually in primary, middle or high school, particularly in Australia and New Zealand, at lunch or recess as a codified variant of kick-to-kick. It is played with football (typically oblique spheroid shaped or sometimes round). While not officially an Australian rules football variant it shares a significant skill set with Australian rules football including kicking, aim, distance control, running and catching and is often played with an Australian rules ball. The rules are usually modified by students themselves, depending on what environment they are playing on. While there are no standard rules, the game is increasingly codified and endorsed as a recreational school age game by various sports bodies including the Australian Football League and AFL New Zealand.

=== Rec Footy ===
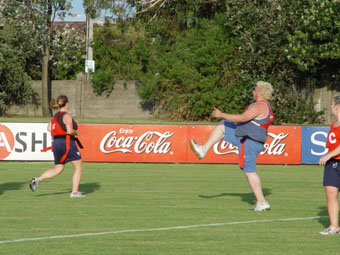
Recreational Football

Recreational Football (also known as Rec Footy or Recreational Footy) was a non-contact version sanctioned by the AFL first codified in 2003. It was relaunched and rebranded as AFL 9s in 2011.

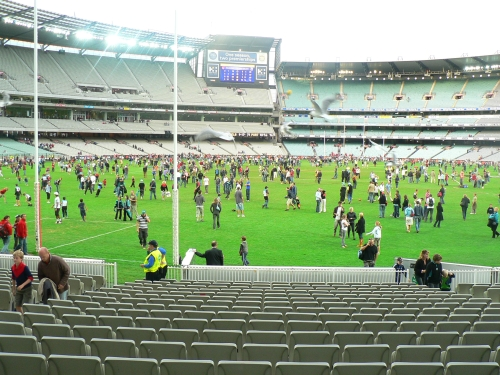
The after-game kick-to-kick tradition at the Melbourne Cricket Ground is a rare sight in professional football (albeit often seen at quarter breaks in local games). Following an AFL match between the Melbourne and Port Adelaide, 16,000 fans were let on to the field.

== Hybrid codes ==
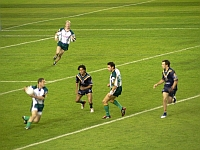
An international rules football match at the Telstra Dome in Melbourne, Australia, between Australia and Ireland.

=== International Rules Football ===
International rules football (Irish: Peil na rialacha idirnáisiunta; also known as inter rules in Australia and compromise rules in Ireland) is a hybrid code of football, which was first codified in 1967 to facilitate international representative matches between Australian rules football players and Gaelic football players.

=== Austus ===
Austus is a sport which was started in Australia during World War II when United States soldiers wanted to play football against the Australians. The game combined features of Australian rules football and American football. The rules of the game were mostly the same as Australian rules football, except that the American-style forward pass was allowed and afforded the same benefits as an Australian rules football kick, meaning that a thrown ball could be marked or used to score goals.

=== Universal Football ===
Universal football was a proposed hybrid sport of Australian rules football and rugby league, as a means of unifying Australia under a single dominant football code. First codified in 1914, the game was originally designed to be played by teams of 15 on rectangular fields with rugby-style goalposts featuring a crossbar. The off-side rules of rugby league applied in the forward quarter of the ground and did not apply elsewhere. Handpasses, which included throws, could only be made backwards. Rugby scrums were eliminated and replaced with the Australian rules football style ball-up. Players could be tackled anywhere between the knee and the shoulders. The Australian rules style of mark was kept. Tries were worth three points, conversions and goals from marks kicked over the crossbar were worth one point, and goals kicked on the run were worth two points.

There was some progress towards amalgamating the two sports in 1915, but these were halted by the escalation of World War I and the new code was not revived after the war ended. The concept was briefly revisited in 1933 with similar rules, and a private trial match was played at the Sydney Showground, but it did not result in a lasting revival of the concept which has not been seen since.
