= AFLX =

Shortened variation of Australian rules football

- Highest governing body: AFL Commission
- First played: March, 2017; Lakeside Stadium, Melbourne, Victoria

Characteristics
- Team members: originally 7 per side + 5 interchange (differs to men's 18 per side + 4 interchange)
- Type: Team sport; Ball sport; Contact sport
- Venue: Football pitch (soccer field)

AFLX is a variation of Australian rules football designed in 2017 to be played on a soccer field (significantly smaller than the Australian rules oval). Unlike the full 18-a-side game (or the already established variant for rectangular fields, nine-a-side footy, including the AFL's own variant AFL 9s), AFLX required fewer players (initially 7, but increased to 8) with some modified rules aimed at generating higher scores, including increased scoring points. It was founded in an attempt to appeal to a wider audience outside of its origin country of Australia. The AFL billed AFLX as its answer to Twenty20 or rugby sevens.

The AFL held two official Australian Football League (AFL) pre-season AFLX competitions featuring senior AFL clubs and players, in 2018 and 2019, but these were unpopular with spectators and did not return in 2020.

The variation continues to be promoted by the AFL Commission as a participation sport in development regions and areas, and particularly where full-sized cricket grounds are not available. Since the COVID-19 pandemic, AFLX has been merged with AFL 9s and retained only the X brand, co-branding AFL 9s as Junior X, Youth X and Senior X and aligning it with the more widely established 9-a-side format.

== Rules ==
The rules of the game differed from standard Australian rules football in some significant ways. The game was played on a rectangular soccer-sized pitch, allowing matches to be hosted by stadiums that usually lacked the suitable field dimensions for Australian rules football. The format was modified in the second year, with AFLX 2019 seeing slightly changed rules:

- Games consist of two 10-minute halves with a two-minute break at half-time.
- Played on a rectangular field with dimensions similar to that of a soccer field.
- Eight players on the field per team, with six players on the bench and no limit to rotations (up from the 10 players per side in 2018).
- Last-touch out-of-bounds rule introduced (team that had last touch loses possession).
- The field umpire will throw the ball up to begin play at the start of each half and after a supergoal is scored.
- 10-point super goals are registered for goals kicked from outside the 40-metre arc.
- No marks paid for backwards kicks (except for kicks/marks inside the forward 40-metre arc).
- Free shot from inside the 40-metre arc to the opposite team in the event of a rushed behind.
- Players can run 20 metres without taking a bounce or touching the ball on the ground.
- During the last 5 minutes of the match, there is a nominated "Game Changer" from each team. These players points are doubeled for the remaining minutes, for instance a behind is 2 points, a goal is 12 points and a super goal is 20 points.

== History ==
AFLX was first trialled at Arden Street Oval in January 2017. Two months later, it was trialed at was first trialled on a soccer pitch at Lakeside Stadium in a match between the Port Melbourne Football Club and Coburg Football Club. It was launched by AFL manager of football operations Simon Lethlean that July and later hailed by the AFL as key means of kickstarting Australian rules football in China as part of the AFL and Port Adelaide's push in to the country which was acknowledged to lacked the infrastructure to support the growth of the full 18-player game.

AFLX pre-season competition was launched by AFL chief executive officer Gillon McLachlan at Docklands Stadium on 6 February 2018. McLachlan said that AFLX would help promote football internationally.

The 2018 competition attracted more than 40,000 fans to tournaments in Adelaide, Melbourne and Sydney. In Melbourne, TV ratings were reported as "modest" by AFL standards, with the three events drawing an average five-city metro audience of over 120,000 on Channel Seven's secondary channels.

The AFL made several rule tweaks midway through the second season in attempt to make it higher scoring by inflating the scoring points for behinds from 1 to 2, goals from 6 to 12 and Super Goals from 10 to 20.

The 2019 E. J. Whitten Legends Game was also played under "EJX" (modified version of AFLX named after E J Whitten) at AAMI Park in Melbourne. It attracted just 6,000 spectators, the lowest in the series history.

AFLX did not return as a senior AFL competition in 2020, as AFL had a greater focus on AFLW.

Post the COVID-19 pandemic, the AFL increased the number of players to 9, effectively merging AFLX with AFL 9s and aligning with the widely established 9-a-side format.

== Reception ==
The reception to the two AFL pre-season competitions among fans and the media was mostly poor, with ABC Radio Grandstand journalist Richard Hinds being particularly savage in labelling it a "hollow, unappealing, pressure-free, atmosphere-deficient, oval-in-a-rectangle hole yawn-fest".

Con Stavros of RMIT's school of Economics, Finance and Marketing, expressed doubts about the potential of AFLX to export Australian rules football but acknowledged that using rectangular playing fields instead of the standard cricket ones would make such expansion easier.

== AFL Pre-season Tournaments ==
Season	Winner(s)
2018	Group A: Adelaide Crows; Group B: Melbourne Demons; Group C: Brisbane Lions
2019	Rampage

== See also ==
- Nine-a-side footy
- AFL 9s
- International rules football
