= 2018 AFLX competition =

The 2018 AFLX competition was the inaugural Australian Football League (AFL) pre-season series of matches, played under the laws of AFLX, a variation of Australian rules football. The matches were played from 15 to 17 February 2018.

== Fixtures ==
The AFL released the fixture and format for the three groups on 24 January 2018. Each of the groups were split into two pools of three teams, with the top team from each pool playing off in a grand final.

== Group A (Adelaide) ==
=== Pool A ===
Team	Pld	W	L	D	PF	PA	PD	Pts
Geelong	2	2	0	0	129	100	29	8
Fremantle	2	1	1	0	94	94	0	4
Port Adelaide	2	0	2	0	97	126	-29	0

	Pool A
15 February (6:10 pm)	Port Adelaide 5.1.4 (60)	def. by	Geelong 3.6.6 (72)	Coopers Stadium, Adelaide	Report
15 February (7:06 pm)	Geelong 4.2.5 (57)	def.	Fremantle 3.1.4 (40)	Coopers Stadium, Adelaide	Report
15 February (8:02 pm)	Fremantle 1.6.8 (54)	def.	Port Adelaide 2.2.5 (37)	Coopers Stadium, Adelaide	Report

=== Pool B ===
Team	Pld	W	L	D	PF	PA	PD	Pts
Adelaide	2	2	0	0	118	83	35	8
Collingwood	2	1	1	0	89	102	-13	4
West Coast	2	0	2	0	83	105	-22	0

	Pool B
15 February (6:38 pm)	Adelaide 2.7.3 (65)	def.	Collingwood 1.3.9 (37)	Coopers Stadium, Adelaide	Report
15 February (7:34 pm)	West Coast 0.7.4 (46)	def. by	Adelaide 3.3.5 (53)	Coopers Stadium, Adelaide	Report
15 February (8:30 pm)	Collingwood 3.3.4 (52)	def.	West Coast 0.5.7 (37)	Coopers Stadium, Adelaide	Report

=== Grand final ===
	Grand Final
15 February (9:03 pm)	Geelong 2.4.3 (47)	def. by	Adelaide 3.3.7 (55)	Coopers Stadium, Adelaide (crowd: 10,253)	Report

== Group B (Melbourne) ==
=== Pool A ===
Team	Pld	W	L	D	PF	PA	PD	Pts
Melbourne	2	2	0	0	152	100	52	8
North Melbourne	2	1	1	0	129	138	-9	4
Carlton	2	0	2	0	122	165	-43	0

	Pool A
16 February (6:40 pm)	Carlton 2.5.4 (54)	def. by	Melbourne 7.1.6 (82)	Etihad Stadium, Melbourne	Report
16 February (7:36 pm)	North Melbourne 5.4.9 (83)	def.	Carlton 5.2.6 (68)	Etihad Stadium, Melbourne	Report
16 February (8:32 pm)	Melbourne 1.9.6 (70)	def.	North Melbourne 3.2.4 (46)	Etihad Stadium, Melbourne	Report

=== Pool B ===
Team	Pld	W	L	D	PF	PA	PD	Pts
Hawthorn	2	2	0	0	150	109	41	8
St Kilda	2	1	1	0	107	114	-7	4
Essendon	2	0	2	0	91	125	-34	0

	Pool B
16 February (7:08 pm)	Hawthorn 3.6.7 (73)	def.	Essendon 3.3.6 (54)	Etihad Stadium, Melbourne	Report
16 February (8:04 pm)	Essendon 2.2.5 (37)	def. by	St Kilda 2.5.2 (52)	Etihad Stadium, Melbourne	Report
16 February (9:00 pm)	St Kilda 2.5.5 (55)	def. by	Hawthorn 4.5.7 (77)	Etihad Stadium, Melbourne	Report

=== Grand final ===
	Grand Final
16 February (9:33 pm)	Melbourne 3.3.8 (56)	def.	Hawthorn 1.5.6 (46)	Etihad Stadium, Melbourne (crowd: 22,585)	Report

== Group C (Sydney) ==
=== Pool A ===
Team	Pld	W	L	D	PF	PA	PD	Pts
Brisbane Lions	2	2	0	0	130	119	11	8
Richmond	2	1	1	0	110	100	10	4
Greater Western Sydney	2	0	2	0	92	113	-21	0

	Pool A
17 February (4:10 pm)	Greater Western Sydney 2.2.2 (34)	def. by	Richmond 3.2.7 (49)	Allianz Stadium, Sydney	Report
17 February (5:06 pm)	Richmond 4.3.3 (61)	def. by	Brisbane Lions 4.3.8 (66)	Allianz Stadium, Sydney	Report
17 February (6:02 pm)	Brisbane Lions 3.5.4 (64)	def.	Greater Western Sydney 2.6.2 (58)	Allianz Stadium, Sydney	Report

=== Pool B ===
Team	Pld	W	L	D	PF	PA	PD	Pts
Sydney	2	2	0	0	159	77	82	8
Gold Coast	2	1	1	0	128	94	34	4
Western Bulldogs	2	0	2	0	58	174	-116	0

	Pool B
17 February (4:38 pm)	Sydney 4.7.5 (87)	def.	Western Bulldogs 1.4.2 (36)	Allianz Stadium, Sydney	Report
17 February (5:34 pm)	Western Bulldogs 0.3.4 (22)	def. by	Gold Coast 2.10.7 (87)	Allianz Stadium, Sydney	Report
17 February (6:30 pm)	Gold Coast 1.4.7 (41)	def. by	Sydney 2.8.4 (72)	Allianz Stadium, Sydney	Report

=== Grand final ===
	Grand Final
17 February (7:03 pm)	Brisbane Lions 5.2.5 (67)	def.	Sydney 2.3.3 (41)	Allianz Stadium, Sydney (crowd: 9,892)	Report
