= Kick-to-kick =

Australian rules football tradition

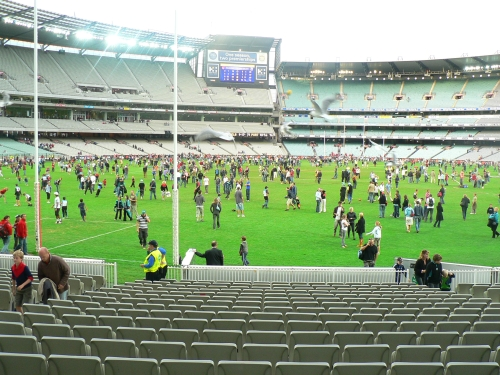
The aftergame kick-to-kick tradition at the Melbourne Cricket Ground is now a rare sight. Follows an AFL match between the Melbourne Demons and the Port Adelaide Power, 16,000 fans are let onto the turf.

Kick-to-kick is a pastime and well-known tradition of Australian rules football fans, and a recognised Australian term for kick and catch type games. It is a casual version of Australian rules (similar to the relationship between backyard/beach cricket and the established forms of cricket).

Although not a sport in itself, the term is used to describe a social exercise played in parks, fields, streets, back yards and also as a playground game that requires at least two people. Kick-to-kick is used as a warm-up exercise of many Australian rules football clubs and has been the beginnings of many clubs in far-flung places.

It has long been a pitch invasion tradition in the breaks immediately after official Australian rules football matches, although as professionalism in the Australian Football League increased, the practice was discontinued at most AFL venues. In recent years, kick-to-kick games have been usually limited to two or three per round, usually between clubs that have friendly relations (that is, not likely to cause conflict if fans from opposing teams meet on the field, such as Collingwood and Carlton), or those designated "Kids Go Free" games by the home team. Kick to kick is sometimes colloquially called the "fifth quarter" that week's edition of the AFL Record. Fans are only allowed on following the sounding of a siren, once the centre square has been demarcated and players/media vacating the field, and usually have approximately 15 minutes to roam the field.

== Informal kick-to-kick ==
The two players will space themselves about 15 metres or more apart and alternate kicking whilst the other marks. Sometimes players will run and/or bounce when returning a long ball and experiment with different kicking styles, such as the drop punt, torpedo punt or checkside punt. If goal posts are present, participants will often position themselves in front and behind the posts to practice scoring. Kick-to-kick is often a family pastime and many footballers learned their skills in games of backyard kick-to-kick. It has been suggested that informal kick-to-kick can assist in battling obesity in children.

== Variations ==
More formal kick-to-kick can involve multiple players, usually grouped in two bunches at either end for easier return of the ball, resulting in similar informal games, such as forceback. This type of play can include some play contesting, many Australian rules fans requiring a stepladder player to emulate the specky or spectacular mark seen on the football field, often also heard crying out famous names of spectacular mark proponents such as Jesaulenko, Ablett or Capper.

== Origins of the pastime ==
The ancient indigenous Australian game of Marn Grook, which is believed by some to have influenced Australian rules football, is similar in many ways to the modern varieties of the kick-to-kick pastime.

The kick-to-kick practice is described in the 1858 novel Tom Brown's School Days about life at Rugby School, as "The punt-about is the practice-ball, which is just brought out and kicked about anyhow from one boy to another" in the pre-match routine. This punt-about football was closer in shape and size to an Australian rules ball than a rugby union match ball. Similar to kick-to-kick being used as a warm-up exercise of many Australian rules football clubs, rugby clubs in Sydney in the early 1870s were using the punt-about as a training option to improve drop-kicking. The term 'punt about' in relation to Australian rules football appears in newspapers in Victoria in the 19th century, whereas the modern 'kick to kick' name does not, with the earliest found documented reference made in 1914.

== Kick-to-kick type practice in other sports ==
Rugby union and rugby league fans and players do not tend to participate in kick-to-kick as much as Australian rules football fans (primarily because kicking is a specialist technique in these sports; and because of variants of the codes that are playable on a small scale, such as touch football). Gaelic football and association football (soccer) fans also participate in a form of kick-to-kick with the round ball.

== References in popular culture ==
Playing "Kick to kick football" is sometimes used by Australian rules fans as a derogatory term to describe uncontested, possession based style of play sometimes seen at the professional AFL level, which many fans find boring and compare to non-contact sports such as basketball, and netball. This is because kick-to-kick does not generally involve any of the contesting found in an official game of Australian rules football, such as tackling, bumping, smothering (known as a "charge down" in rugby league), spoiling and other one percenters which often result in more unpredictable change of possession.

Rock band TISM featured a song titled "'And The Ass Said to the Angel: "Wanna Play Kick To Kick?'" on the album Great Truckin' Songs of the Renaissance in 1988.

Michael Leunig painted "Street Football" in 1990.

The pastime inspired a short film named "Kick to Kick" by Tony McNamara in 2000.

Auskick in 2007 used the kick-to-kick tradition as part of their promotional television campaign, which shows kids from around the country kicking the football to each other to the tune of Gimme Dat Ding.
