= Australian rules football in the Americas =

Australian rules football has been played in the Americas since the turn of the 20th Century, beginning with North American countries Canada and the United States in 1905 and 1906 respectively. However it has only been played consistently at an organised regular amateur level since the establishment of the current Canadian competition in 1989 followed by a United States competition in 1996. More recently it has been played in South America in Colombia since 2015 and Chile since 2017. There have also been clubs formed for occasional play in other South American nations including Bermuda, Brazil and Argentina. As there are too few countries playing separated by great distances, there is currently no formal regional governing body and international competition between countries is currently overseen cooperatively by AFL Canada and the USAFL.

The major regional tournaments include the 49th Parallel Cup (1999-), Andes Cup (2016-) and AFL Transatlantic Cup (2024-). The best international results for an American national teams are Canada's women's team who were crowned international champions at the 2014 Australian Football International Cup. The best result by a men's team was by the United States men's team which placed third at the 2005 Australian Football International Cup.

== Argentina ==
Australian rules football has been played in Buenos Aires, Argentina since 1997, the Asociación Argentina de Futbol Australiano as the de facto governing body.

Ricardo Acuña, having seen footage of the game in the 1990s, decided to start the game in Argentina and is now president of the Argentine Alternative Sports Association. The Argentine Australian Football Association (AAFAU) was founded and competition started in 1997 with a group of 3 teams consisting of about 30 or 40 mainly rugby union players. The league grew to four senior sides in Buenos Aires, with Under 19s sides associated with each senior team, and a growing number of juniors and school squads reported to be in creation. Serious competition began in 1999.

A 'Convicts Tour' of amateur footballer from Australia was planned in 2006 in an effort to see Argentina compete in the 2008 Australian Football International Cup, although this tour was later cancelled.

The first international match between Argentina and Chile was played in May 2008 in Buenos Aires, with the Santiago Saints winning.

On the 23 October 2010, Australian amateur sports touring team the Australian Convicts defeated the national team of Argentina 24 to 18 as part of its South American tour.

== Barbados ==
Australian rules is not currently played in Barbados, however there has been a player in the AFL with strong connections to Barbados - Josh Gibson.

=== Notable players ===
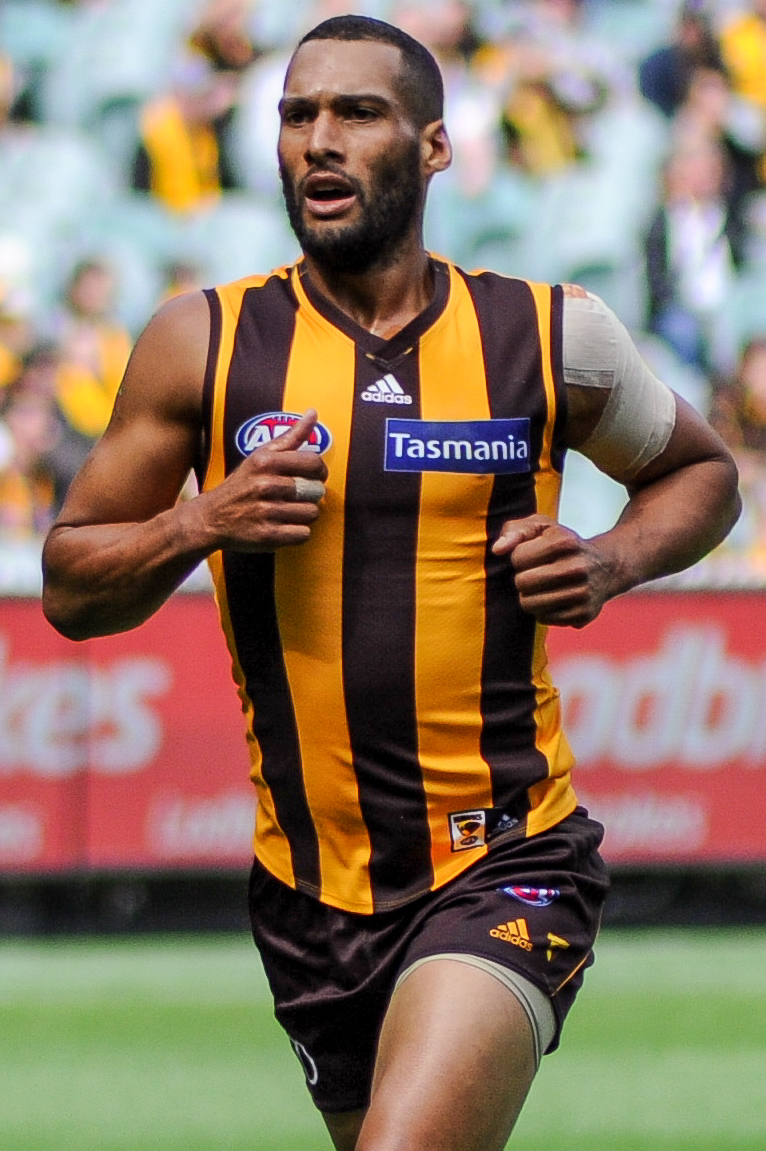
Josh Gibson playing for the Hawthorn Football Club in 2017

Player	AFL/AFLW Years*	AFL/AFLW Matches*	AFL/AFLW Goals*	Connections to Barbados, References
Josh Gibson	2005–2017	225	5	Father

== Bermuda ==
Australian rules football has been played on the island of Bermuda since 2005, when the Bermuda Lions were created.

The island was to host the first Bermuda Australian Football Championships in 2007, featuring teams from Europe and North America in addition to local players. This tournament was later postponed indefinitely.

=== Clubs ===
Team	Location	Founded	Notes
Bermuda Lions	Hamilton	2005	Folded around 2007

== Brazil ==
Australian Rules in Brazil began in 2009 with the creation of a side dubbed 'The Carnaval', composed mainly of Australians resident across the country.

The Carnaval were coordinated by Australian Trade Commissioner Greg Wallis, who took up the challenge of creating a Brazilian side for a match against Chile's Santiago Saints after meeting with Saints President Robert Spurr. The first match between the Saints and Carnaval took place in Rio de Janeiro on June 20, 2009. A match in Buenos Aires against the Argentine national team is planned for later in 2009.

On the 13 April 2011, Australian amateur sports team the Australian Convicts played against the Brazilian national team in Rio as part of its South American tour.

Notable players: Héritier Lumumba - Brazilian mother

== Canada ==
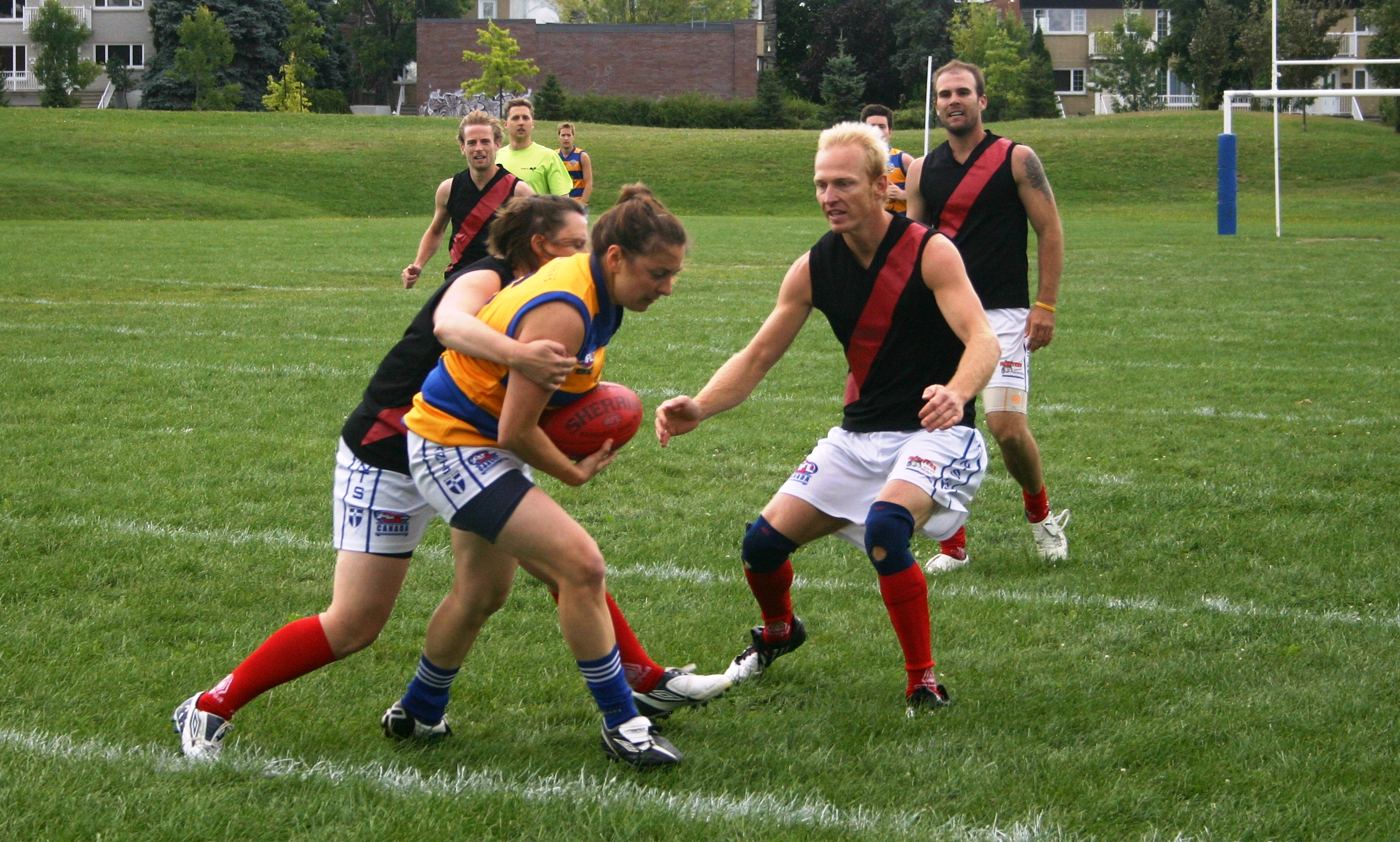
2010 ECAFL Grand Final

Australian rules football is played at an organised level in the provinces of Ontario, British Columbia, Quebec, Alberta and Nova Scotia. The Canadian Men's and Women's national teams have competed at every Australian Football International Cups to date, including all six on the men's tournaments and all three women's tournaments. AFL Ontario is the largest Australian rules football league in North America.

== Cayman Islands ==
Australian rules is played a few times each year by expatriate Australians and Irishmen in the Cayman Islands. A number of Australians play in the local Gaelic football competition, and generally the Aussie Rules matches are held between the Australians and Irish on Anzac Day and St Patricks Day each year.

== Chile ==
Australian rules football was first played in Chile in 2002, and was part of an experiment for SPT Gestion Deportiva (a local Sports Marketing company based in Santiago) to introduce new sports into the country and develop business opportunities around it. Adrian Barraza who during that time was part from SPT Gestion Deportiva, contacted two players with previous experience in Australian rules football through the "Big Footy" Internet forum to have a "Kick in the park". Those two players were: Michael "Diesel" Hrzic (from the OC Bombers) and the Chilean Alejandro Dussaillant. Both players met in the USA when they were studying a PhD at the University Wisconsin-Madison and played in the local Australian rules football team. The first "Kick in the park" was held at the Padre Alberto Hurtado Park in late 2002. The same year Barraza was put in contact through the local Australian Embassy with Simon Shalders, an Australian expat owner of a backpackers Hostel called "La Casa Roja" located in downtown Santiago, to explore new ways to develop the sport in the country. Some new "Kicks in the park" were organised between 2002 and 2004, mainly between a group of locals and La Casa Roja's guests but Chilean players' involvement kept low and the sport went into a hiatus.

The first discussions to organise a club were held in late 2007 at a local cricket game by Rob Spurr, who was an Australian expat working in Chile during that time and also was a founder member of the Jakarta Bintangs Australian rules football club from Indonesia. The country's first organised club, the Santiago Saints, were founded in March 2008 by Rob Spurr and a group of Australian expats and locals, which included among others Adrian Barraza (former SPT Gestion Deportiva partner), Pablo Majias (former Port Adelaide reserves player and current player/coach of the Santiago Saints) and Mario Pavez (a Chilean interchange student who spent a couple of years living in Australia and learnt the sport there).

The Santiago Saints played their first match against Argentina on July 5, 2008 in a 9 a side format, winning 19.10 (124) to Argentina's 1.5 (11). Continued recruitment of locals saw a Chile vs Anzacs match held in early 2009, the Anzacs consisting of the Saints expatriate players and the Chilean team being all-local.

On June 20, 2009, the Saints travelled to Rio de Janeiro for a match against a side of Australians resident in Brazil dubbed the 'Carnaval', the first ever match to be held on Brazilian soil. The game was again played on a 9 a side format and this time the Santiago Saints team was made by half Chileans and half Australian players. The Chilean team won 14.12.96 to 11.6.72 in a hard-fought game, claiming the inaugural Copa Cabana.

The Saints and Colombia's Bogota Bulldogs have contested an annual Andes Cup since 2016.

=== Clubs ===
Team	Location	Founded	Notes
Santiago Saints	Santiago	2008	Facebook page

=== Notable players ===
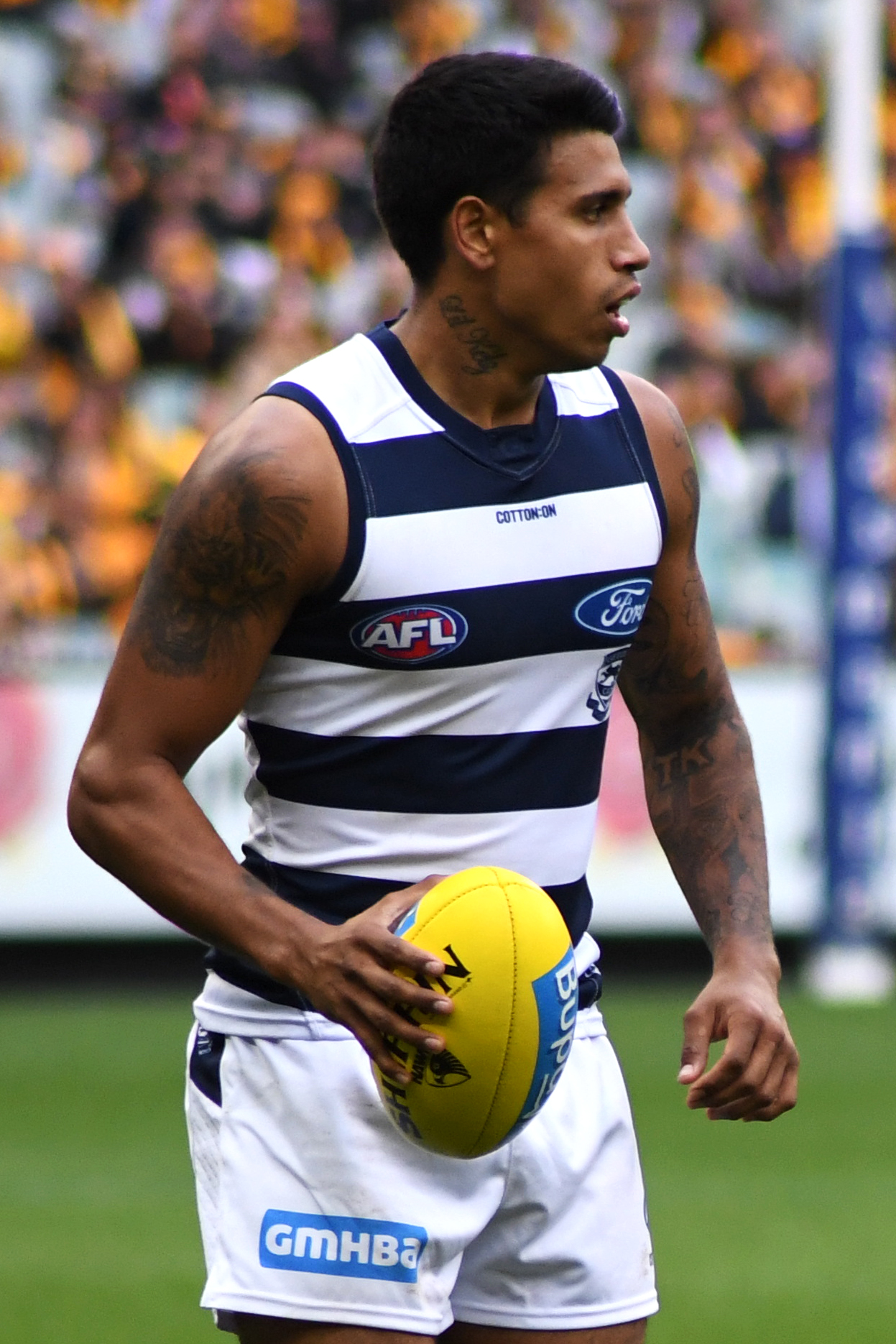
Tim Kelly playing with the Geelong Football Club in 2019

Player	AFL/AFLW Years*	AFL/AFLW Matches*	AFL/AFLW Goals*	Connections to Chile, References
Tim Kelly	2018-	98	64	Mother
Jose Romero	1988-2001	211	169	Born (Easter Island)

== Colombia ==
Colombia has a governing body AFL Colombia, two leagues, one in Bogotá (Colombian Australian Football League or (CAFL) run by the Bogota Bulldogs) and one in Medellín with 300 registered players male and female.

The first club formed in Bogotá was the Bulldogs in 2015 to challenge the Santiago Saints club (from Chile) and it has grown to include numerous local players and promising junior programs. Colombia played an international in 2016 against Chile. A women's team formed in 2019 and played an internationals against a combined USA and Europe team. The club runs a local competition known as the Colombian Australian Football League (CAFL) with 3 teams however it relies heavily on visiting clubs from the USA for competition and has hosted the Austin Crows and Denver Bulldogs.

Colombia's programs attracted attention from Australia and include a number of corporate supporters including Orica, Australian Embassy in Colombia, and the Victoria State Government. Former AFL player Josh Kennedy has also assisted with development at the grassroots.

The Bulldogs and Chile's Santiago Saints contested an annual Andes Cup since 2016.

In 2024 Colombia sent a team to the Transatlantic Cup in Toronto, Canada.

=== Clubs ===
Team	Location	Founded	Notes
Bogota Bulldogs	Bogotá	2015	Facebook page

== Cuba ==
Australian rules is not currently played in Cuba, however there have been professional players with strong Cuban connections.

=== Notable players ===
Player	AFL/AFLW Years*	AFL/AFLW Matches*	AFL/AFLW Goals*	Connections to Cuba, References
Leo Lombard	2025-	4	1	Father
Brian Roet	1961-1968	88	1	Born

== Jamaica ==
A high profile match was played in 1915 by Australian servicemen (Army and Navy) at Sabina Park in Kingston, Jamaica. It was believed to be the first time the sport was played in Jamaica.

Players of Jamaican descent in the 2010s and 2020s have begun to make a mark in both the AFL and AFLW.

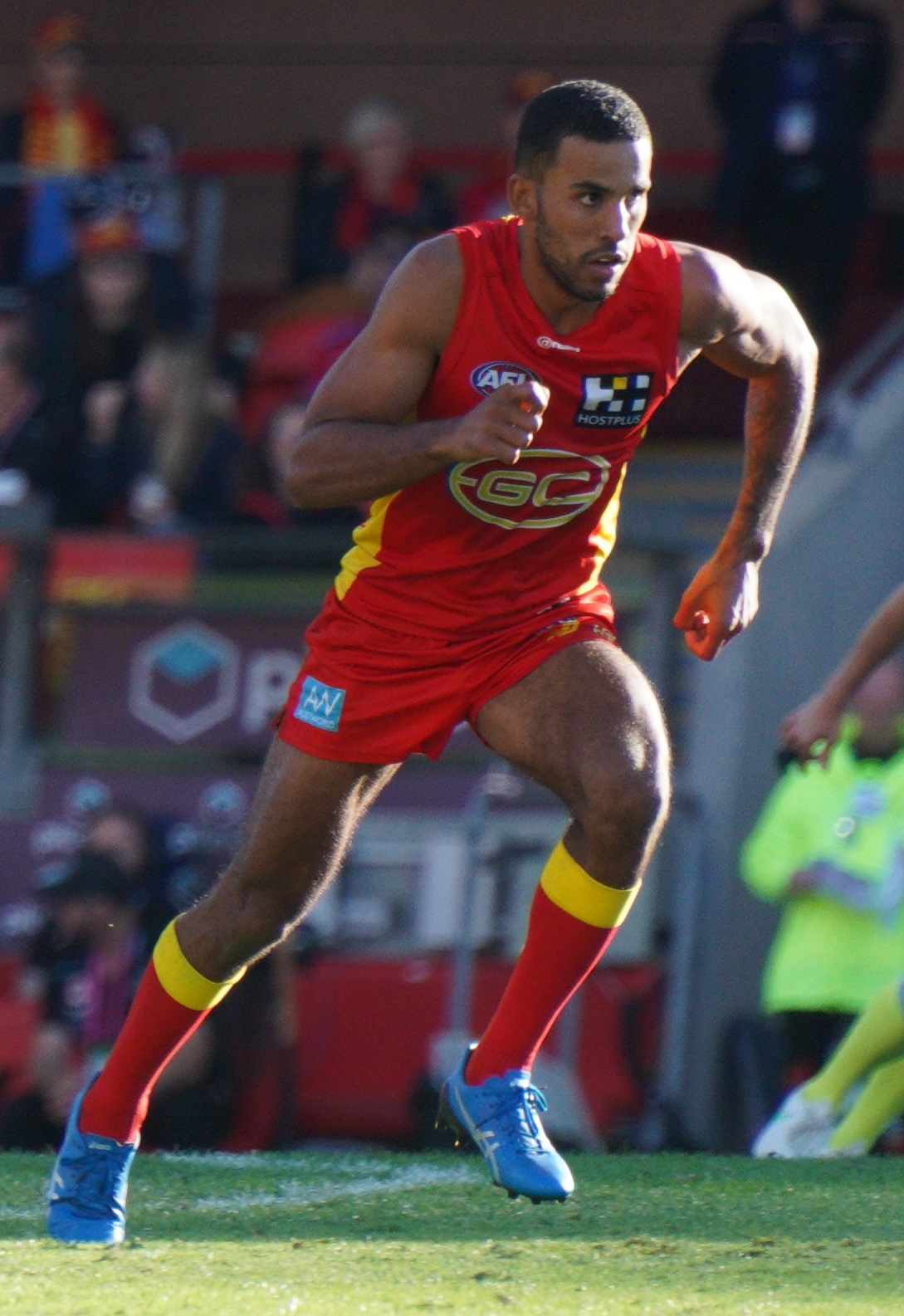
Touk Miller playing for Gold Coast in 2021

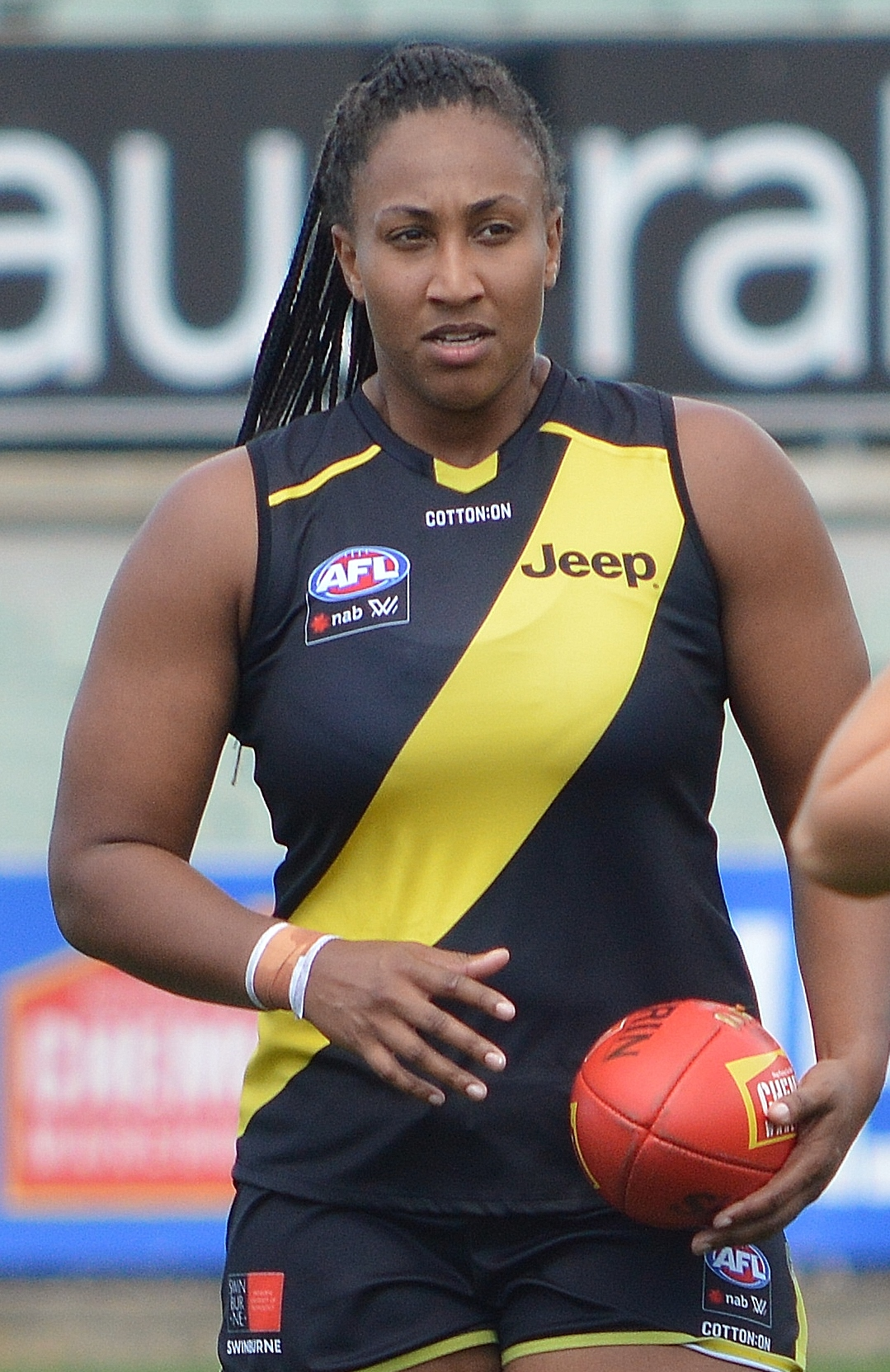
Sabrina Frederick playing for Richmond FC in 2020

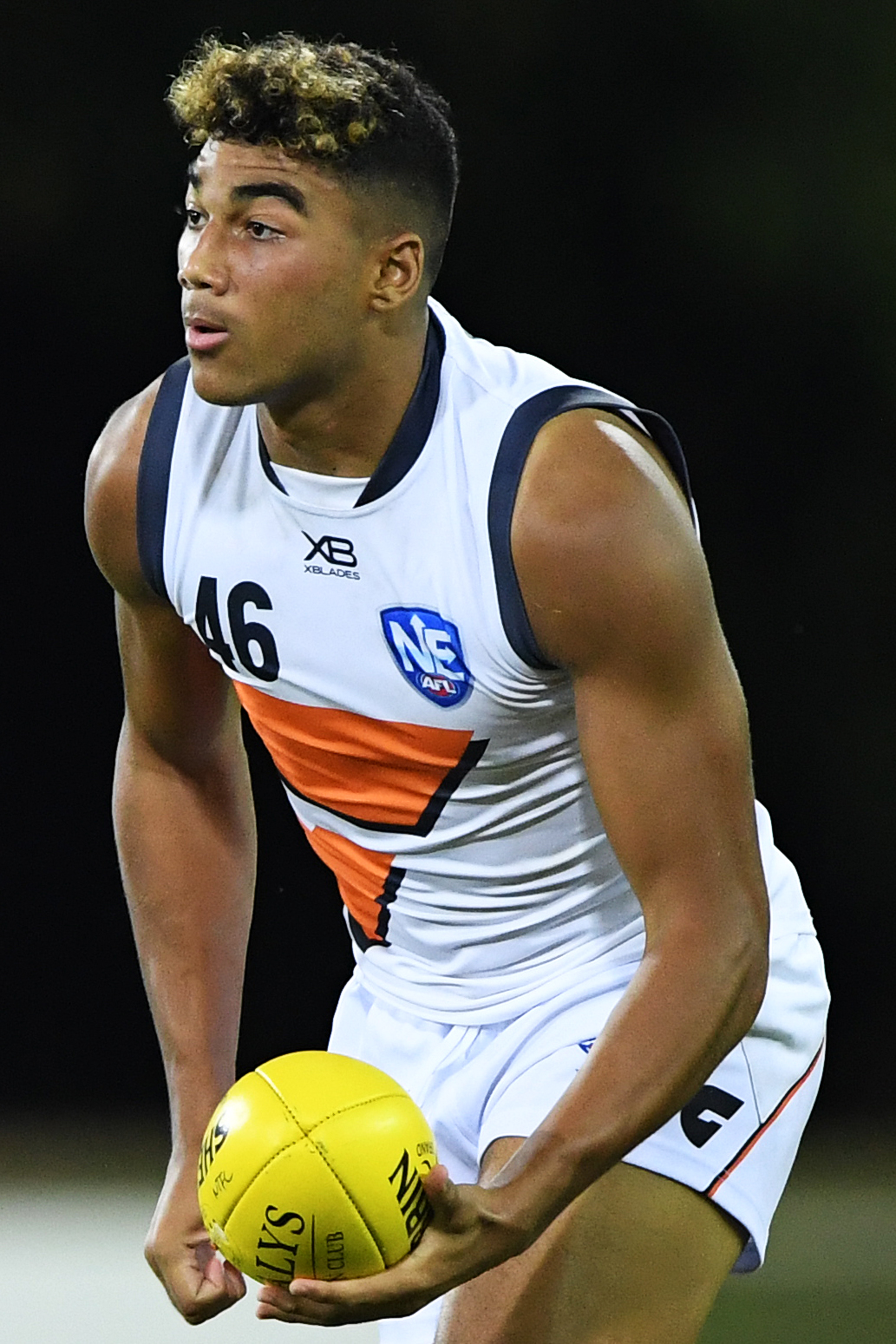
Callum Brown playing for the Greater Western Sydney Giants in 2019

Player	AFL/AFLW Years*	AFL/AFLW Matches*	AFL/AFLW Goals*	Connections to Jamaica, References
Callum Brown	2021-	15	7	Father
Sabrina Frederick	2017-	59	26	Mother
Touk Miller	2015-	165	47	Mother

== Peru ==
Australian rules is not currently played in Peru, however Peruvian Nick Shipley played in the AFL with the Greater Western Sydney Giants and hoped to inspire other South Americans to take up the sport.

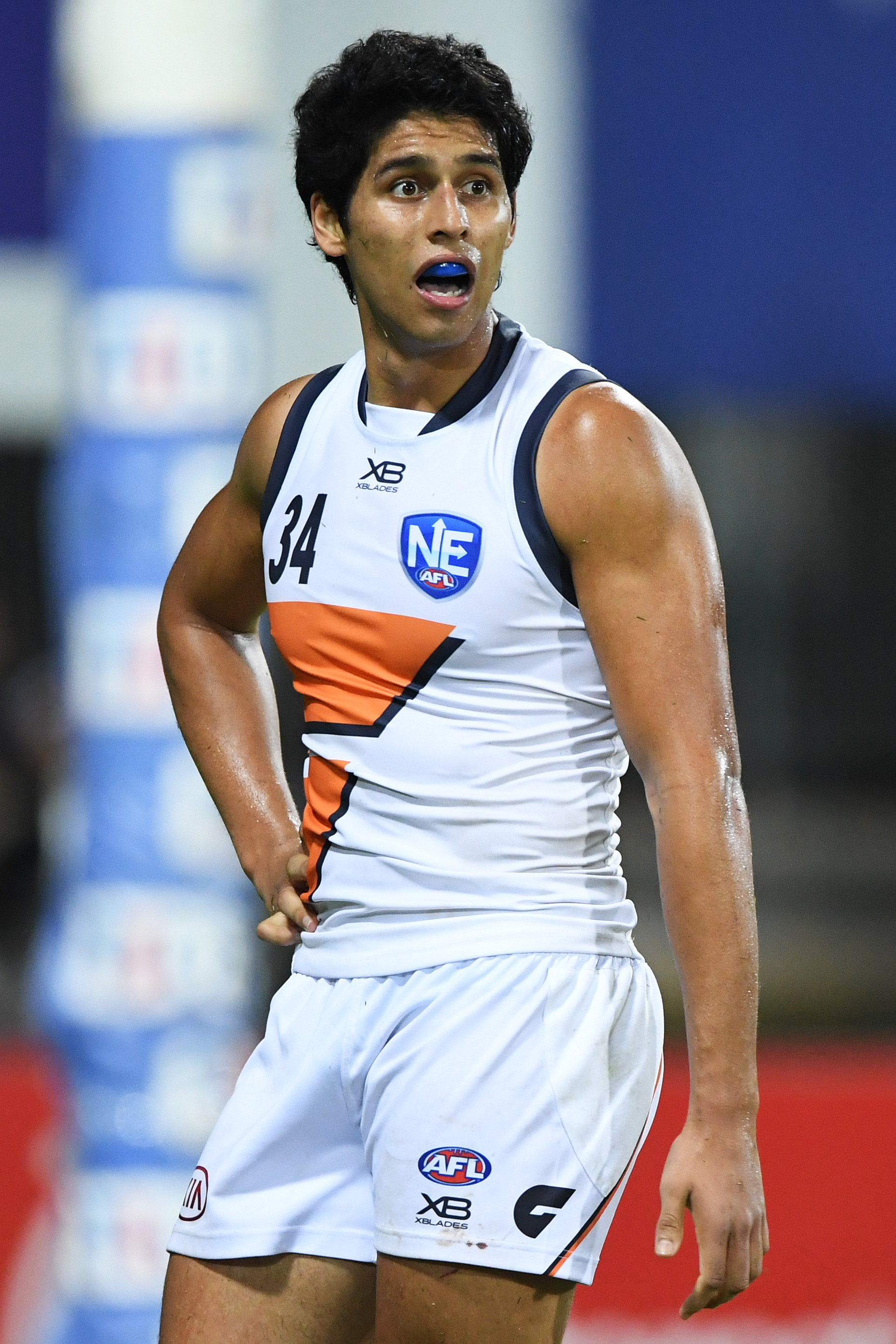
Nick Shipley playing for the Greater Western Sydney Giants in 2019

=== Notable players ===
Player	AFL/AFLW Years*	AFL/AFLW Matches*	AFL/AFLW Goals*	Connections to Peru, References
Nick Shipley	2018–2021	6	0	Mother

== United States ==
The United States is home to one of the larger communities of Australian rules football clubs and leagues outside Australia, with around 2,000 players and 40 clubs nationwide. The governing body is the United States Australian Football League.

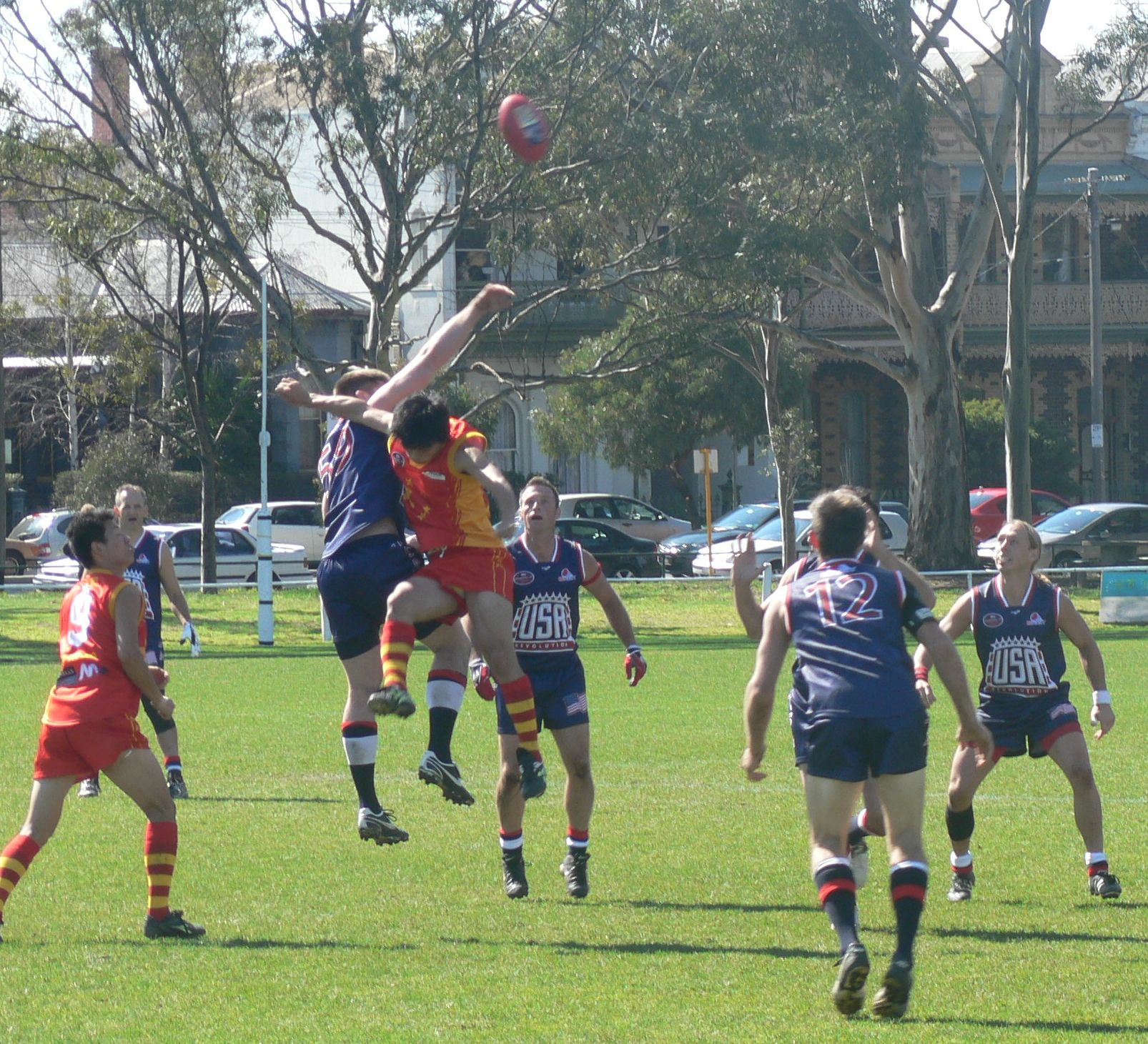
USA Revolution men's team contests the ruck against China in the 2008 Australian Football International Cup
