= List of Australian rules football rivalries =

This list deals with Australian rules football rivalries in Australia and around the world. This includes club teams, which compete in local derbies as well as matches between club teams further afield. Also lists international rivalries and rivalries between individual players.

== Individuals ==
=== Rivalries between players ===
1st Party	2nd Party	Timespan	Source
Glen Jakovich	Wayne Carey	1991–2004	

=== Rivalries between coaches ===
1st Party	2nd Party	Timespan	Source
Fos Williams	Jack Oatey	1950–1978	
Kevin Sheedy	Mick Malthouse	1984–2013	

== International ==
- Canada–United States (49th Parallel Cup)

== Australia ==
=== Interstate ===
- South Australia–Victoria
- South Australia–Western Australia
- Victoria–Western Australia

=== Australian Football League ===
==== Local AFL derbies ====
- West Coast v Fremantle (Western Derby)
- Adelaide v Port Adelaide (Showdown)
- Brisbane Lions v Gold Coast (QClash)
- Sydney v Greater Western Sydney (Sydney Derby)

==== Victorian Football League rivalries ====
- Carlton v Collingwood
- Essendon v Carlton
- Melbourne v Collingwood
- Richmond v Collingwood
- Hawthorn v Essendon
- Richmond v Carlton
- Essendon v Collingwood
- Essendon v Richmond
- North Melbourne v Hawthorn
- Hawthorn v Geelong
- Essendon v North Melbourne
- Collingwood v Geelong
- Geelong v Richmond
- Fitzroy v Collingwood
- South Melbourne v St Kilda

==== Interstate rivalries ====
- Western Bulldogs v Greater Western Sydney

==== Recent rivalries ====
- Collingwood v West Coast
- West Coast v Sydney
- Brisbane Lions v Collingwood
- Collingwood v Port Adelaide
- Fremantle v Carlton
- Hawthorn v Sydney

=== South Australian National Football League ===
- Norwood–Port Adelaide (main article: Port Adelaide–Norwood)
- Port Adelaide–Sturt
- North Adelaide–Glenelg

=== West Australian Football League ===
- East Fremantle–South Fremantle (Fremantle Derby)

=== Tasmanian State League ===
- Clarence Football Club-Glenorchy Football Club]
- Launceston Football Club-North Launceston Football Club
- Clarence Football Club-Lauderdale Football Club
- North Hobart Football Club-Glenorchy Football Club

=== Northern Territory Football League ===
- St Mary's–Darwin

=== Victorian Football League/Association ===
- Coburg–Northern Bullants (main article: Battle of Bell Street)
- Williamstown–Port Melbourne

=== Tallangatta Football League ===
- Beechworth–Chiltern
- Kiewa-Sandy Creek–Mitta United

== United States ==
- New York–Boston
