= Samoa rules =

Samoan game

Samoa rules is a game derived from Australian rules football and rugby union that is occasionally played in Samoa.

== Rules ==
Generally the rules are taken from Australian rules, but each team consists of 15 players, like rugby union.

Unlike Australian rules football, player movement is restricted to zones (similar to rec footy). There is a line across the centre that backs and forwards can not cross. Onballers are allowed to go anywhere. Forwards can only operate in their attacking half, the backs in their defensive half. Like Gaelic football, players are permitted to bounce the ball only once while running, in order to encourage kicking.

== Pitch ==
The game is played on rugby union fields, sometimes a single one, or two side by side. This means the pitch is rectangular, rather than oval, like an Australian football field.

== History ==
The Vailima Six-Shooters' Championship began in Samoa in 1998 under these rules, becoming known as Samoa rules. A number of Samoa rules players went on to represent Samoa in the Samoa national Australian rules football team.
