= Australian rules football =

Contact sport

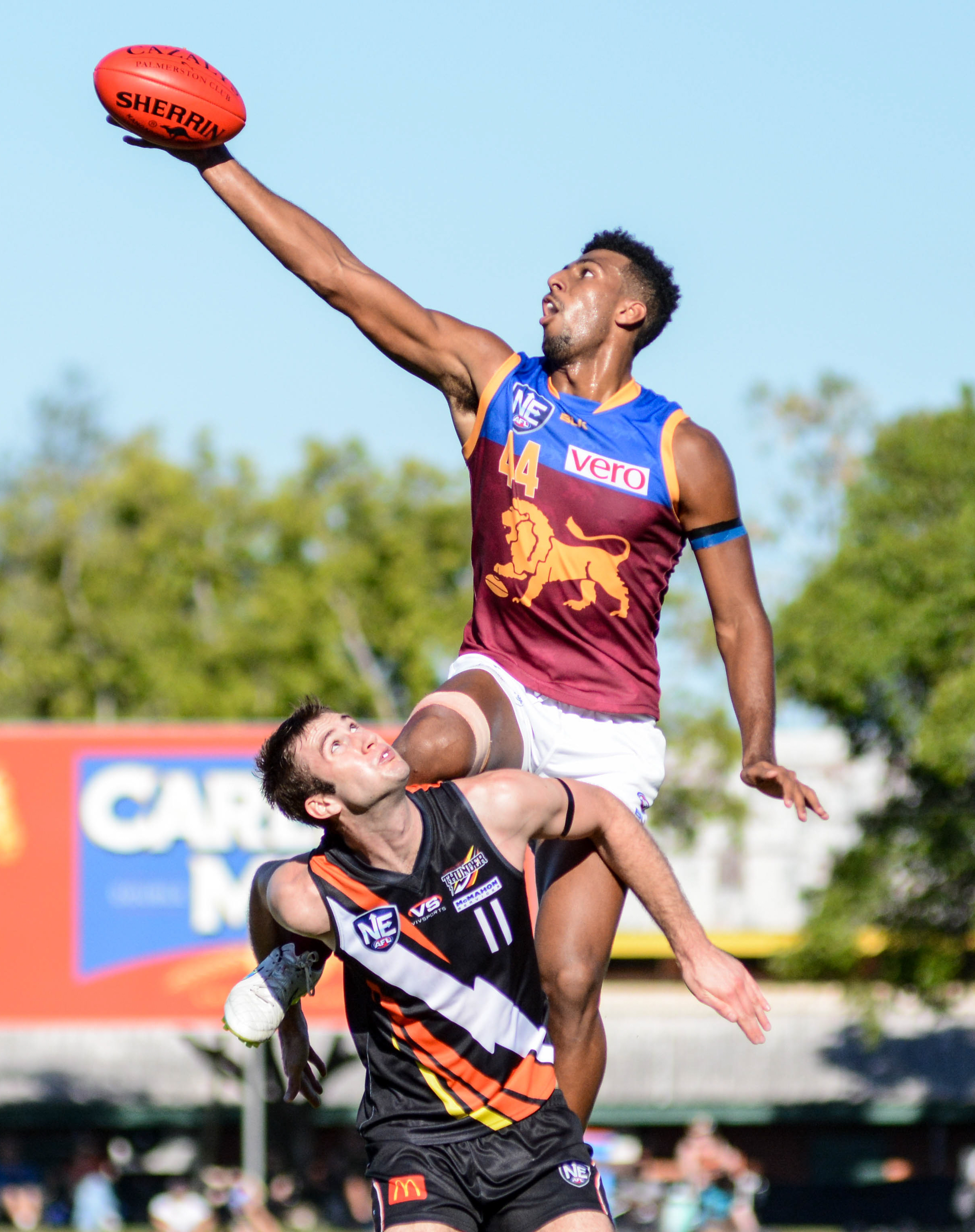
- A ruckman leaps above his opponent to win the hit-out during a ball-up
- Highest governing body: AFL Commission
- Nicknames: Australian football, Aussie rules, football, footy, AFL
- First played: 15 June 1859; 167 years ago in Melbourne, Australia

Characteristics
- Contact: Yes
- Team members: 22 (18 onfield, 5 interchange)
- Mixed-sex: Up to age 14
- Type: Team sport; ball game
- Equipment: Football
- Venue: Australian rules football playing field
- Glossary: Glossary of Australian rules football

Presence
- Country or region: Australia
- Olympic: Demonstration sport, 1956 Melbourne Olympics

Australian rules football or Aussie rules, also known simply as Australian football, football or footy in Australia, is a contact sport played between two teams of 18 players on an oval field, often a modified cricket ground. Points are scored by kicking the oval ball between the central goal posts (worth six points), or between a central and outer post (worth one point, otherwise known as a "behind").

During general play, players may position themselves anywhere on the field and use any part of their bodies to move the ball. The primary methods are kicking, handballing, and running with the ball. There are rules on how the ball can be handled; for example, players running with the ball must intermittently bounce or touch it on the ground. Throwing the ball is not allowed, and players must not get caught holding the ball. A distinctive feature of the game is the mark, where players anywhere on the field who catch the ball from a kick (with specific conditions) are awarded unimpeded possession. Possession of the ball is in dispute at all times except when a free kick or mark is paid. Players can tackle using their hands or use their whole body to obstruct opponents. Dangerous physical contact (such as pushing an opponent in the back), interference when marking, and deliberately slowing the play are discouraged with free kicks, distance penalties, or suspension for a certain number of matches depending on the severity of the infringement. The game features frequent physical contests, spectacular marking, fast movement of both players and the ball, and high scoring.

The sport's origins can be traced to football matches played in Melbourne, Victoria, in 1858, inspired by English public school football games. Seeking to develop a game more suited to adults and Australian conditions, the Melbourne Football Club published the first laws of Australian rules football in May 1859.

Australian rules football has the highest spectator attendance of all sports in Australia while the Australian Football League (AFL), the sport's only fully professional competition, is the nation's wealthiest sporting body. The AFL Grand Final, held annually at the 100,024-capacity Melbourne Cricket Ground, is the highest-attended club championship event of any football code. The sport is also played at amateur level in many countries and in several variations. Its rules are governed by the AFL Commission with the advice of the AFL's Laws of the Game Committee.

== Name ==
Australian rules football is commonly referred to by several nicknames, including Aussie rules and footy. In some regions, where other codes of football are more popular, the sport is most often called "AFL", after the Australian Football League, while the league itself also uses this name for local competitions in some areas.

== History ==
=== Origins ===
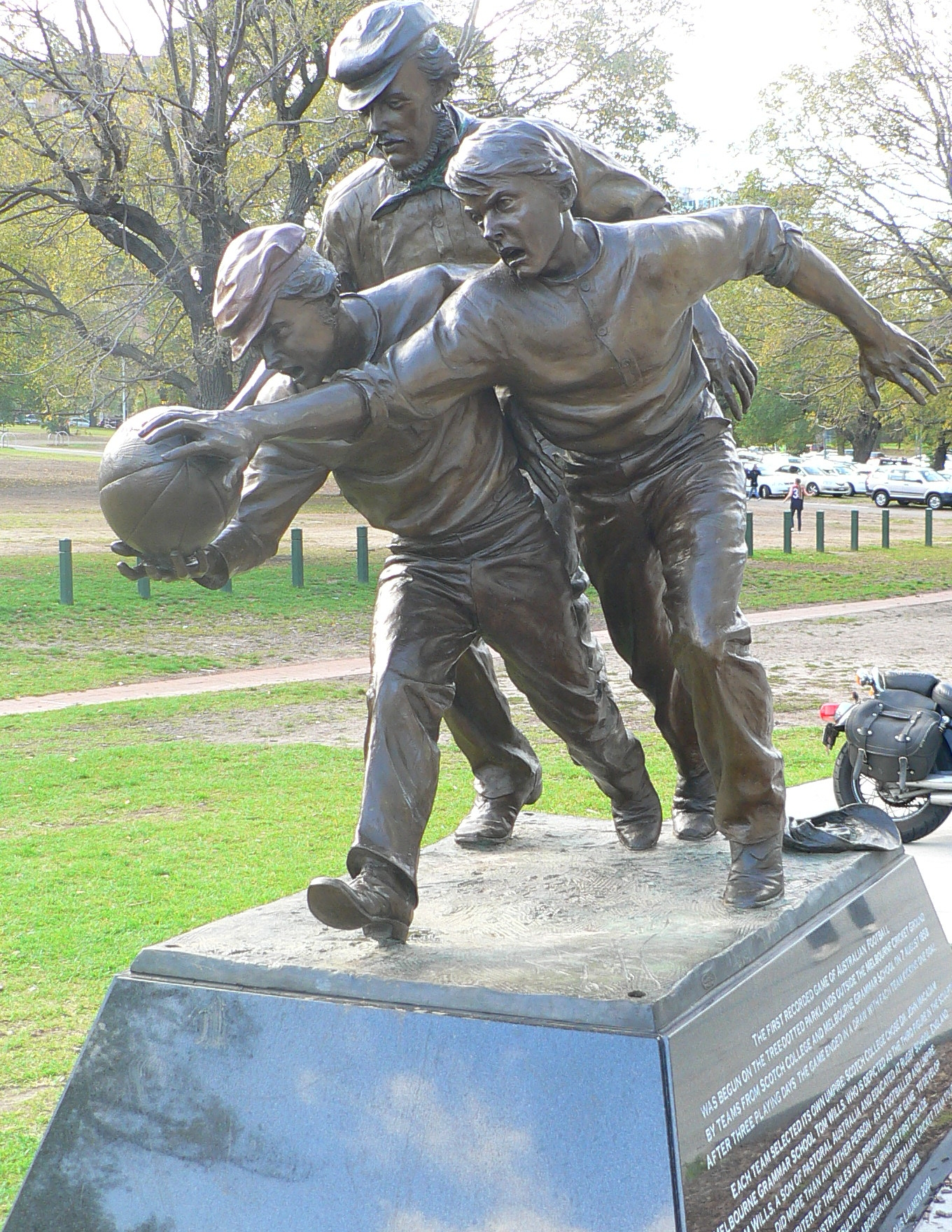
Statue next to the Melbourne Cricket Ground on the approximate site of the 1858 football match between Melbourne Grammar and Scotch College. Tom Wills is depicted umpiring behind two young players contesting the ball. The plaque reads that Wills "did more than any other person – as a footballer and umpire, co-writer of the rules and promoter of the game – to develop Australian Rules Football during its first decade."

Primitive forms of football were played sporadically in the Australian colonies in the first half of the 19th century. Compared to cricket and horse racing, football was considered a mere "amusement" by colonists at the time, and while little is known about these early one-off games, evidence does not support a causal link with Australian rules football. In Melbourne, in 1858, in a move that would help to shape Australian rules football in its formative years, private schools (then termed "public schools" in accordance with nomenclature in England) began organising football games inspired by precedents at English public schools. The earliest match, held on 15 June, was between Melbourne Grammar and St Kilda Grammar.

On 10 July 1858, the Melbourne-based Bell's Life in Victoria and Sporting Chronicle published a letter by Tom Wills, captain of the Victoria cricket team, calling for the formation of a "foot-ball club" with a "code of laws" to keep cricketers fit during winter. Born in Australia, Wills played a nascent form of rugby football while a pupil at Rugby School in England, and returned to his homeland a star athlete and cricketer. Two weeks later, Wills' friend, cricketer Jerry Bryant, posted an advertisement for a scratch match at the Richmond Paddock adjoining the Melbourne Cricket Ground (MCG). This was the first of several "kickabouts" held that year involving members of the Melbourne Cricket Club, including Wills, Bryant, W. J. Hammersley and J. B. Thompson. Trees were used as goalposts and play typically lasted an entire afternoon. Without an agreed-upon code of laws, some players were guided by rules they had learned in the British Isles, "others by no rules at all". Another milestone in 1858 was a 40-a-side match played under experimental rules between Melbourne Grammar and Scotch College, held at the Richmond Paddock. Umpired by Wills and teacher John Macadam, it began on 7 August and continued over two subsequent Saturdays, ending in a draw with each side kicking one goal. It is commemorated with a statue outside the MCG, and the two schools have since competed annually in the Cordner–Eggleston Cup, the world's oldest continuous football competition.

Since the 1920s, it has been suggested that Australian rules football may have been derived from the Irish sport of Gaelic football. However, there is no archival evidence in favour of a Gaelic influence, and the style of play shared between the two modern codes appeared in Australia long before the Irish game evolved in a similar direction. Another theory, first proposed in 1983, posits that Wills, having grown up among Aboriginals in Victoria, may have seen or played the Aboriginal ball game of Marn Grook, and incorporated some of its features into early Australian rules football. There is only circumstantial evidence that he knew of the game, and according to biographer Greg de Moore's research, Wills was "almost solely influenced by his experience at Rugby School".

=== First rules ===
A loosely organised Melbourne side, captained by Wills, played against other football enthusiasts in the winter and spring of 1858. The following year, on 14 May, the Melbourne Football Club was officially established, making it one of the world's oldest football clubs. Three days later, Wills, Hammersley, Thompson and teacher Thomas H. Smith met near the MCG at the Parade Hotel, owned by Bryant, and drafted ten rules: "The Rules of the Melbourne Football Club". These are the laws from which Australian rules football evolved. The club aimed to create a simple code suited to the hard playing surfaces around Melbourne, and to eliminate the roughest aspects of English school games—such as "hacking" (shin-kicking) in Rugby School football—to reduce the risk of injuries to working men. In another significant departure from English public school football, the Melbourne rules omitted any offside law. These first rules had no restrictions on players running with the ball, nor did they set a minimum distance for a kick to secure a mark. "The new code was as much a reaction against the school games as influenced by them", writes Mark Pennings. The rules were distributed throughout the colony; Thompson in particular did much to promote the new code in his capacity as a journalist.

=== Early competition in Victoria ===
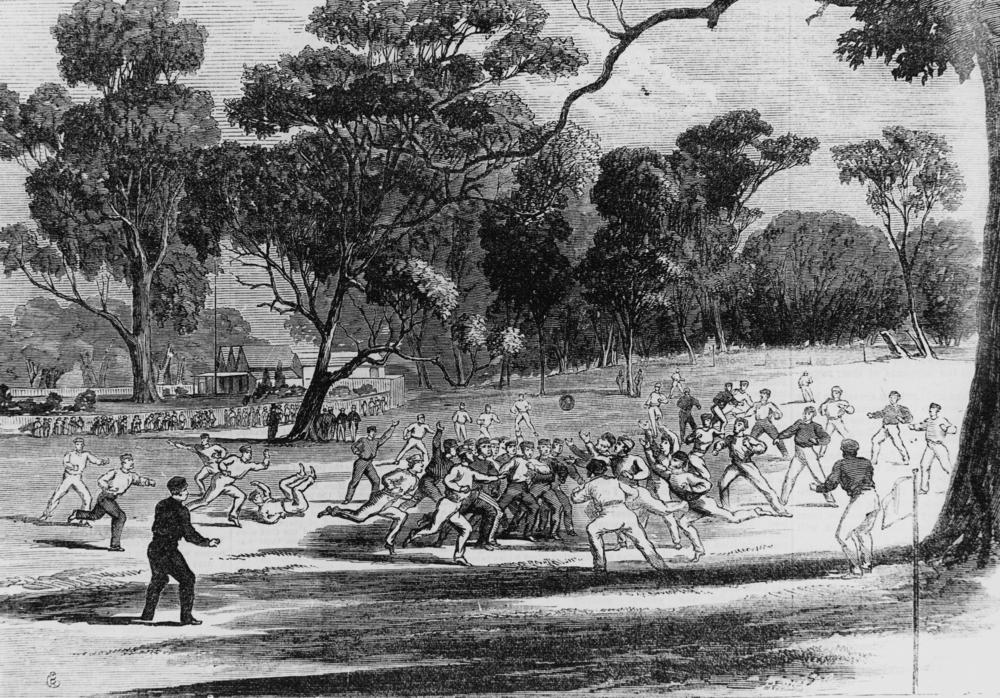
Engraving of a football match at the Richmond Paddock, 1866. The MCG and its first pavilion are visible in the background, as are kick-off posts, the forerunner of today's behind posts.

Following Melbourne's lead, Geelong and Melbourne University also formed football clubs in 1859. While many early Victorian teams participated in one-off matches, most had not yet formed clubs for regular competition. A South Yarra club devised its own rules. To ensure the supremacy of the Melbourne rules, the first club-level competition in Australia, the Caledonian Society's Challenge Cup (1861–64), stipulated that only the Melbourne rules were to be used. This law was reinforced by the Athletic Sports Committee (ASC), which ran a variation of the Challenge Cup in 1865–66. With input from other clubs, the rules underwent several minor revisions, establishing an agreed set known as "Victorian rules". In 1866, the "first distinctively Victorian rule", the running bounce, was formalised at a meeting of club delegates chaired by H. C. A. Harrison, an influential pioneer who took up football in 1859 at the invitation of Wills, his cousin.

The game around this time was defensive and low-scoring, played low to the ground in congested rugby-style scrimmages. The typical match was a 20-per-side affair, played with a ball that was roughly spherical, and lasted until a team scored two goals. Per tradition the code was originally contested on rectangular, rugby-orientated fields, with the boundaries marked out with flags. This dynamic flipped in the late 1870s when Victoria's prominent football clubs permanently moved matches onto enclosed cricket grounds, adapting the game to an oval-shaped surface and utilising the full dimensions available.

=== Spread to other colonies ===
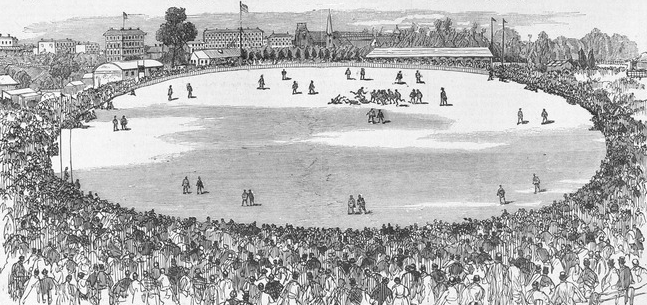
Engraving of the first intercolonial football match between Victoria and South Australia, East Melbourne Cricket Ground, 1879

Football became organised in South Australia in 1860 with the formation of the Adelaide Football Club, the oldest football club in Australia outside Victoria. It devised its own rules, and, along with other Adelaide-based clubs, played a varied game until 1876, when they uniformly adopted most of the Victorian rules, with South Australian football pioneer Charles Kingston noting their similarity to "the old Adelaide rules". Similarly, Tasmanian clubs quarrelled over different rules until they adopted a slightly modified version of the Victorian game in 1879. The South Australian Football Association (SAFA), the sport's first governing body, formed on 30 April 1877, firmly establishing Victorian rules as the preferred model in that colony. The establishment of a unique Australian rules football code came in May 1877 upon the formation of the Victorian Football Association by fourteen metropolitan and provincial clubs.

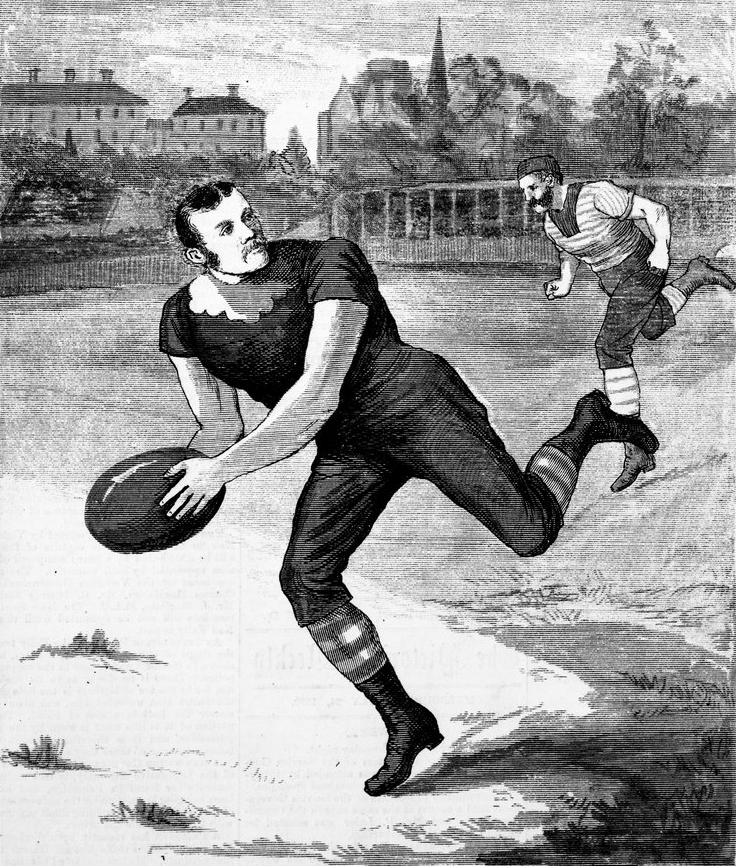
George Coulthard, one of the first players to attain Australia-wide celebrity

Clubs began touring the colonies in the late 1870s, and in 1879 the first intercolonial match took place in Melbourne between Victoria and South Australia. In 1883, delegates representing the football associations of South Australia, Tasmania, Victoria and Queensland met to standardise the code across Australia. New rules such as holding the ball led to a "golden era" of fast, long-kicking and high-marking football in the 1880s, a time which also saw players such as George Coulthard achieve superstardom, as well as the rise of professionalism, particularly in Victoria and Western Australia, where the code took hold during a series of gold rushes. Likewise, when New Zealand experienced a gold rush, the sport arrived with a rapid influx of Australian miners. Now known as Australian rules or Australasian rules, the sport became the first football code to develop mass spectator appeal, attracting world record attendances for sports viewing and gaining a reputation as "the people's game".

Australian rules football reached Queensland and New South Wales as early as 1866; the sport experienced a period of dominance in the former, and in the latter, several regions remain strongholds of Australian rules, such as the Riverina. However, by the late 1880s, rugby football had become the dominant code in both colonies, as well as in New Zealand. This shift was largely due to rugby's spread with British migration, regional rivalries and the lack of strong local governing bodies. In the case of Sydney, denial of access to grounds, the influence of university headmasters from Britain who favoured rugby, and the loss of players to other codes inhibited the game's growth.

=== Emergence of the VFL ===
In 1896, delegates from six of the wealthiest VFA clubs—Carlton, Essendon, Fitzroy, Geelong, Melbourne and South Melbourne—met to discuss the formation of a breakaway professional competition. Later joined by Collingwood and St Kilda, the clubs formed the Victorian Football League (VFL), which held its inaugural season in 1897. The VFL's popularity grew rapidly as it made several innovations, such as instituting a finals system, reducing teams from 20 to 18 players, and introducing the behind as a score. Richmond and University joined the VFL in 1908, and by 1925, with the addition of Hawthorn, Footscray and North Melbourne, it had become the preeminent league in the country and would take a leading role in many aspects of the sport.

=== Interstate football and the World Wars ===
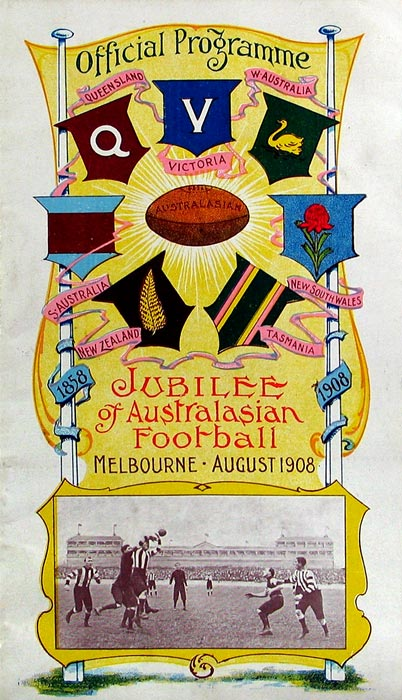
The first national interstate competition was held in 1908 and included New Zealand.

The time around the federation of the Australian colonies in 1901 saw Australian rules undergo a revival in New South Wales, New Zealand and Queensland. In 1903, both the Queensland Australian Football League and the NSW Australian Football Association were established, and in New Zealand, as it moved towards becoming a dominion, leagues were also established in the major cities. This renewed popularity helped encourage the formation of the Australasian Football Council, which in 1908 in Melbourne staged the first national interstate competition, the Jubilee Australasian Football Carnival, with teams representing each state and New Zealand.

The game was also established early on in the new territories. In the new national capital Canberra both soccer and rugby had a head start, but following the first matches in 1911, Australian rules football in the Australian Capital Territory became a major participation sport. By 1981 it had become much neglected and quickly lagged behind the other football codes. Australian rules football in the Northern Territory began shortly after the outbreak of the war in 1916 with the first match in Darwin. The game went on to become the most popular sport in the Territory and build the highest participation rate for the sport nationally.

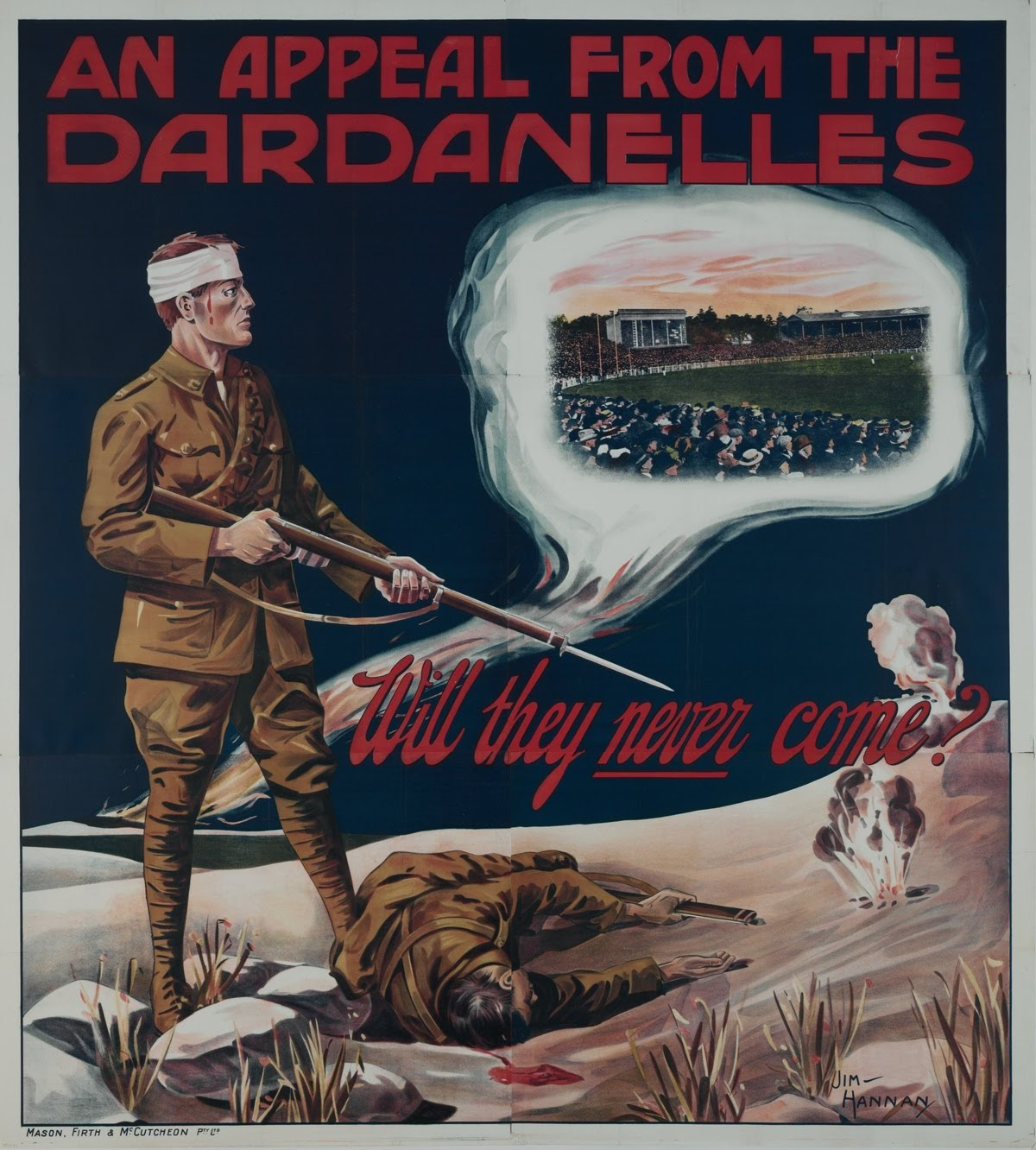
Australia's first recruitment poster, published in 1915, questions the public's commitment to Australian football rather than the war.

Both World War I and World War II had a devastating effect on Australian rules football and on Australian sport in general. While scratch matches were played by Australian "diggers" in remote locations around the world, the game lost many of its great players to wartime service. Some clubs and competitions never fully recovered. Between 1914 and 1915, a proposed hybrid code of Australian rules football and rugby league, the predominant code of football in New South Wales and Queensland, was trialled without success. In Queensland, the state league went into recess for the duration of the war. VFL club University left the league and went into recess due to severe casualties. The West Australian Football League (WAFL) lost two clubs and the SANFL was suspended for one year in 1916 due to heavy club losses. The Anzac Day match, the annual game between Essendon and Collingwood on Anzac Day, is one example of how the war continues to be remembered in the football community.

The role of the Australian National Football Council (ANFC) was primarily to govern the game at a national level and to facilitate interstate representative and club competition. In 1968, the ANFC revived the Championship of Australia, a competition first held in 1888 between the premiers of the VFA and SAFA. Although clubs from other states were at times invited, the final was almost always between the premiers from the two strongest state competitions of the time—South Australia and Victoria—with Adelaide hosting most of the matches at the request of the SAFA/SANFL. The last match took place in 1976, with North Adelaide being the last non-Victorian winner in 1972. Between 1976 and 1987, the ANFC, and later the Australian Football Championships (AFC) ran a night series, which invited clubs and representative sides from around the country to participate in a knock-out tournament parallel to the premiership seasons, which Victorian sides still dominated.

With the lack of international competition, state representative matches were regarded with great importance. Due in part to the VFL poaching talent from other states, Victoria dominated interstate matches for three-quarters of a century. State of Origin rules, introduced in 1977, stipulated that rather than representing the state of their adopted club, players would return to play for the state they were first recruited in. This instantly broke Victoria's stranglehold over state titles and Western Australia and South Australia began to win more of their games against Victoria. Both New South Wales and Tasmania scored surprise victories at home against Victoria in 1990.

=== Towards a national league ===
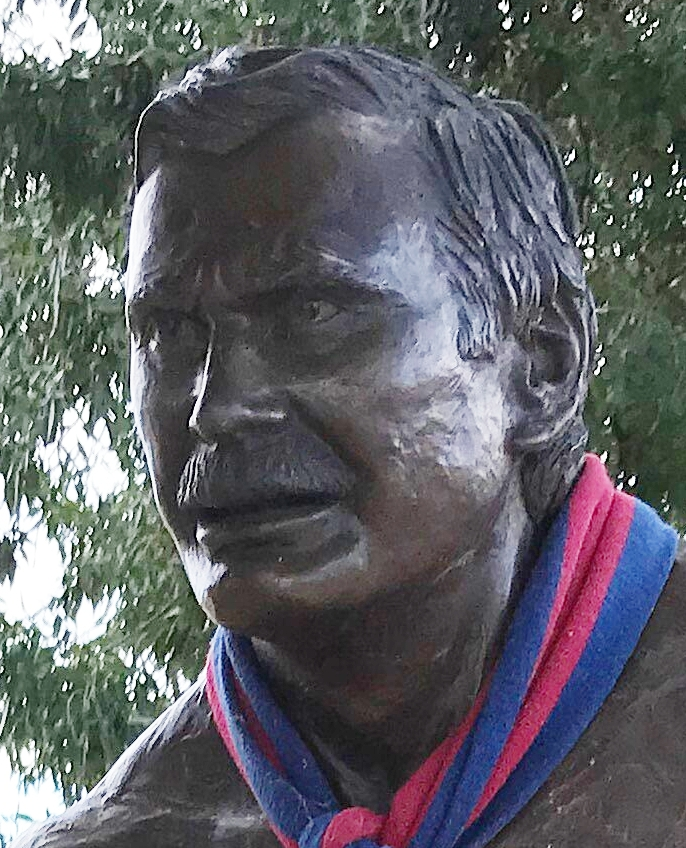
Hall of Fame Legend Ron Barassi was a leading advocate of a national club-based competition.

The term "Barassi Line", named after VFL star Ron Barassi, was coined by scholar Ian Turner in 1978 to describe the "fictitious geographical barrier" separating the rugby-following parts of New South Wales and Queensland from the rest of the country, where Australian rules football reigned. It became a reference point for the expansion of Australian rules football and for establishing a national league.

The way the game was played had changed dramatically due to innovative coaching tactics, with the phasing out of many of the game's kicking styles and the increasing use of handball; while presentation was influenced by television.

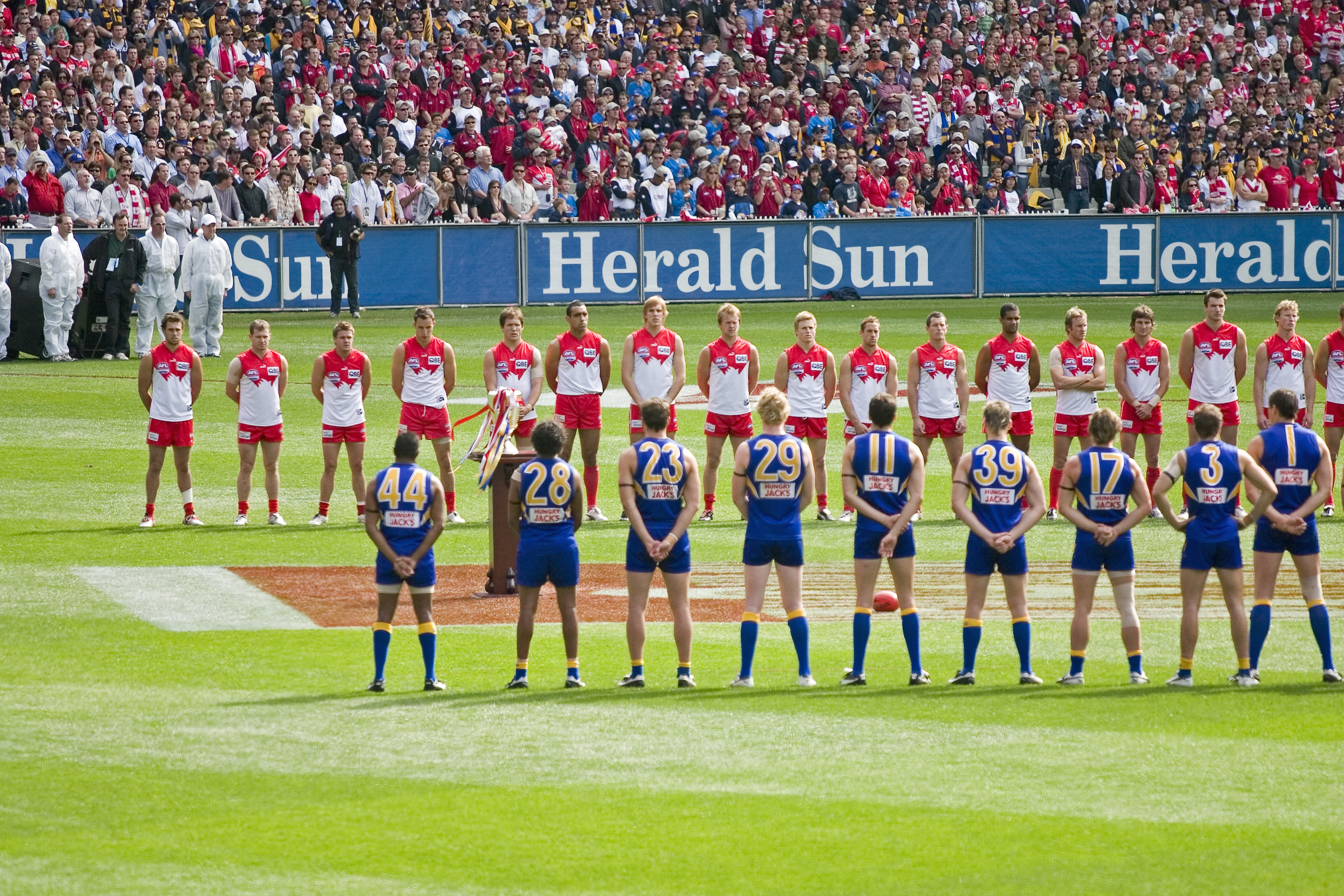
The West Coast Eagles and Sydney Swans line up for the national anthem at the 2005 AFL Grand Final.

In 1982, in a move that heralded big changes within the sport, one of the original VFL clubs, South Melbourne, relocated to Sydney and became known as the Sydney Swans. In the late 1980s, due to the poor financial standing of many of the Victorian clubs, and a similar situation existing in Western Australia in the sport, the VFL pursued a more national competition. Two more non-Victorian clubs, West Coast and Brisbane, joined the league in 1987 generating more than $8 million in license revenue for the Victorian clubs and increasing broadcast revenues which helped the Victorian clubs survive. In their early years, the Sydney and Brisbane clubs struggled both on and off-field because the substantial TV revenues they generated by playing on a Sunday went to the VFL. To protect these revenues the VFL granted significant draft concessions and financial aid to keep the expansion clubs competitive.

The VFL changed its name to the Australian Football League (AFL) for the 1990 season, and over the next decade, three non-Victorian clubs gained entry: Adelaide (1991), Fremantle (1995) and the SANFL's Port Adelaide (1997), the only pre-existing club outside Victoria to join the league. In 2011 and 2012, respectively, two new non-Victorian clubs were added to the competition: Gold Coast and Greater Western Sydney. The AFL, currently with 18 member clubs, is the sport's elite competition and most powerful body. Following the emergence of the AFL, state leagues were quickly relegated to a second-tier status. The VFA merged with the former VFL reserves competition in 1998, adopting the VFL name. State of Origin also declined in importance, especially after an increasing number of player withdrawals. The AFL turned its focus to the annual International Rules Series against Ireland in 1998 before abolishing State of Origin the following year. State and territorial leagues still contest interstate matches, as do AFL Women players.

In the 2010s, the AFL signalled further attempts at expanding into markets outside Australian rules football's traditional heartlands by hosting home-and-away matches in New Zealand, followed by China. After several failed bids since the early 1990s for a Tasmania-based AFL team, the Tasmania Football Club secured the 19th AFL license in 2023, and is set to compete by 2028.

== Laws of the game ==
=== Players and equipment ===
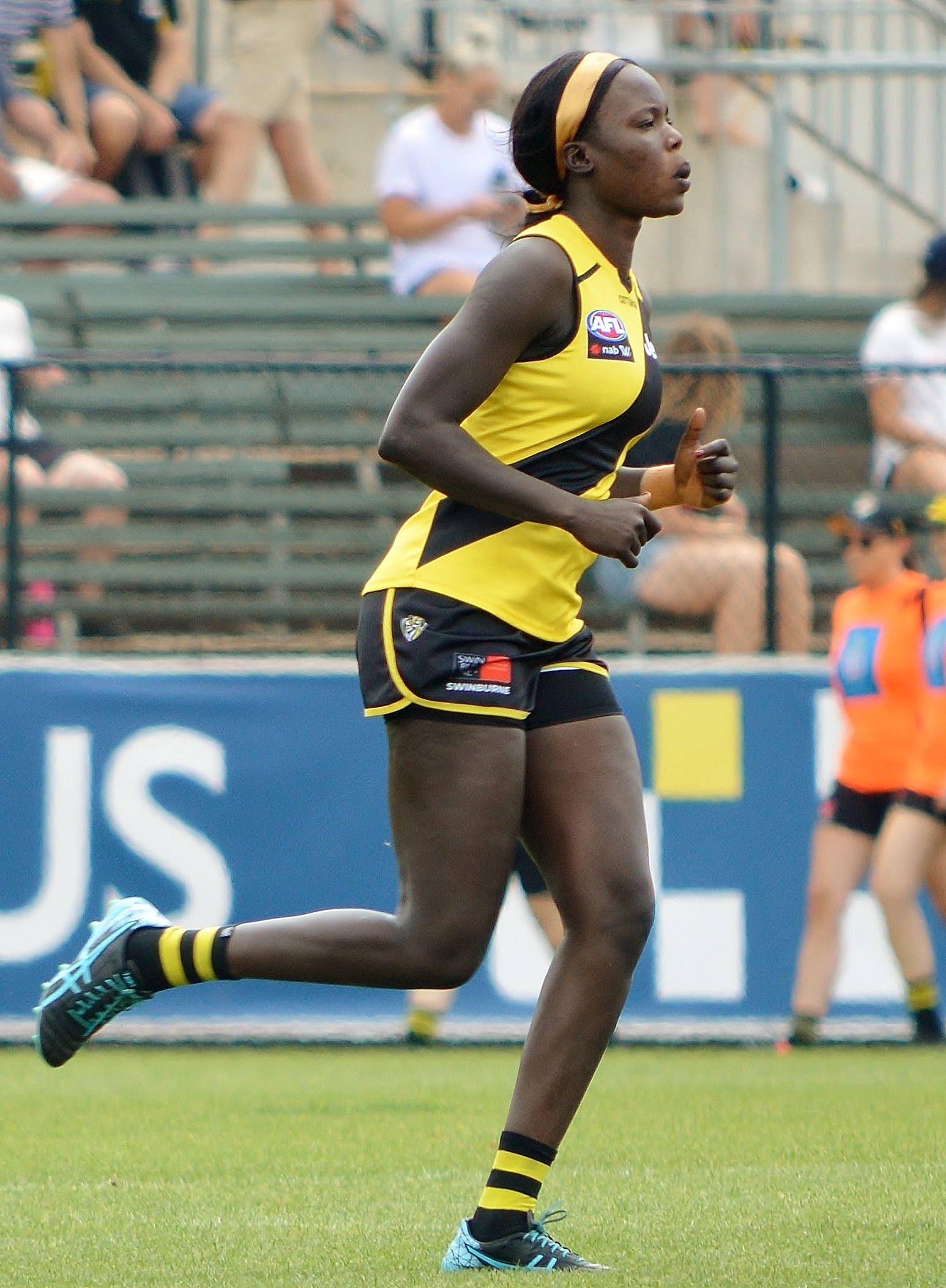
A uniform consists of a guernsey, shorts, socks and boots.

In a standard match, a team may consist of anywhere between 14 and 18 players who may be permitted on the playing surface at any given time. Each team may have up to four interchange (reserve) players who may be swapped for those on the field at any time during the game, although some leagues in less populated areas may use as few as 12 players. In addition, some leagues, notably including the AFL, have each team designate one additional player as a substitute who can be used to make a single permanent exchange of players during a game for either medical or tactical reasons.

Players on the playing surface can be swapped with those on the interchange bench at any time. They must though pass through a designated "Interchange Area". In the event a player fails to pass through this area correctly, or if too many players from one team are found to be on the ground at a time, a free kick will be awarded to the opposing side.

While there is no set uniform, the basic equipment for Australian rules football consists of a guernsey, shorts, socks and football boots (though specialised boots are more often used which have a curved toe for punting and metal studs are officially banned), with additional pieces of apparel such as headbands and gloves additionally being permitted. Players may wear certain pieces of protective equipment, such as helmets or arm guards, if approved by the relevant controlling body. Mouthguards are strongly recommended for all players.

Players are not permitted to wear jewellery, or other materials which the field umpire has deemed to be either potentially dangerous or increase the risk of injury to other players.

=== Ball ===
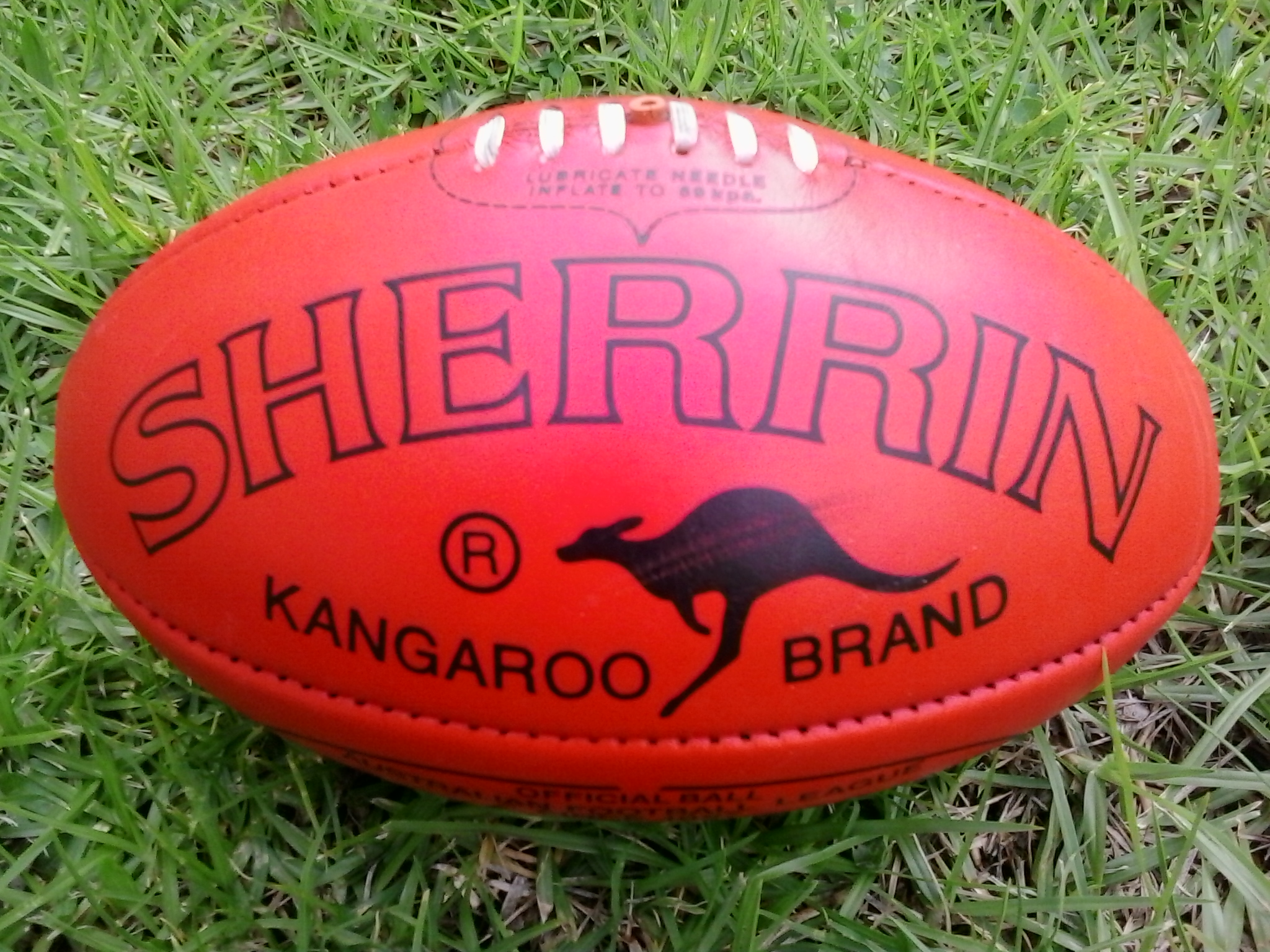
A Sherrin Kangaroo Brand football. Sherrin is the official game ball of the Australian Football League.

Australian rules football is played with an ellipsoid ball, between 72 and 73 cm (28 and 29 in) in long circumference, and 54.5 and 55.5 cm (21.5 and 21.9 in) in short circumference. For women's competitions, a smaller ball size of 69 and 53 cm (27 and 21 in) is used. The ball must be inflated to a pressure of 69 kilopascals (10.0 pounds per square inch). There are no defined laws regarding what material a ball must be made from, but standard AFL match-used balls are produced by Sherrin using cowhide leather.

While there is no standard colour of the ball, red and yellow are most common and the only colours used at AFL level. Yellow is used for games beginning after 3 pm or in an enclosed stadium, due to its greater visibility, and to assist score reviews.

=== Field ===
Typical Australian rules football playing field

Unlike other forms of football which are played on rectangular fields, Australian rules football playing fields are oval-shaped, and are between 135 and 185 metres (148 and 202 yd) long and 110 and 155 metres (120 and 170 yd) wide.

At either end of the field, two sets of posts are erected in a straight line to indicate the scoring areas on the field, each with two kinds of posts, named the goal posts and the behind posts respectively. The goal posts are placed first, located 6.4 metres (7.0 yd) apart from each other, with a behind post being placed a further 6.4 metres to the side of each goal post. The name for the field line between two goal posts is known as the Goal Line.

Around the perimeter of the field, two white lines are drawn between the set of behind posts in an arc-shape, marking the field of play.

Other field markings include:

- An arc drawn 50 metres (55 yd) from either end of the playing surface, known as the fifty metre arc.
- A 50 by 50 metres (55 yd × 55 yd) square located in the centre of the playing surface, known as the centre square.
- A 10 by 10 metres (11 yd × 11 yd) circle located in the centre of the playing surface, known as the centre circle
- A rectangle drawn at either end of the ground, measuring 9 metres (9.8 yd) out from each pair of goal posts. This is known as the goal square.

The 50m arcs, centre square, centre circle and goal square are used at the beginning of each quarter or after each goal. Each team is permitted a maximum of six players in each 50m arc, with one in the goal square and four players in the centre square with one in the centre circle. If this is breached, a free kick is awarded.

=== Match duration ===
A game lasts for 80 minutes, split into four quarters consisting of 20 minutes playing time, with the clock being stopped for stoppages in play such as scores, or at the umpire's discretion, e.g. for serious injury. Leagues may choose to employ shorter quarters of play at their discretion, such as the AFLW using 17 minutes per quarter.

For any given match, two timekeepers are appointed to officiate the duration. The timekeepers record all relevant statistics for the match, such as total quarter duration and score by each team. Additionally timekeepers are required to sound a siren prior to and at the conclusion of each quarter until such time they are acknowledged by the field umpires. To stop and recommence the clock, the field umpires are required to signal to the timekeepers to indicate when the clock should be stopped or restarted.

Between each quarter, a break is observed to allow players a rest period. Two six-minute breaks are observed between the first and second quarters, and the third and fourth quarters. A longer 20-minute break is observed between the second and third quarter, commonly known as half-time.

=== Officiation ===
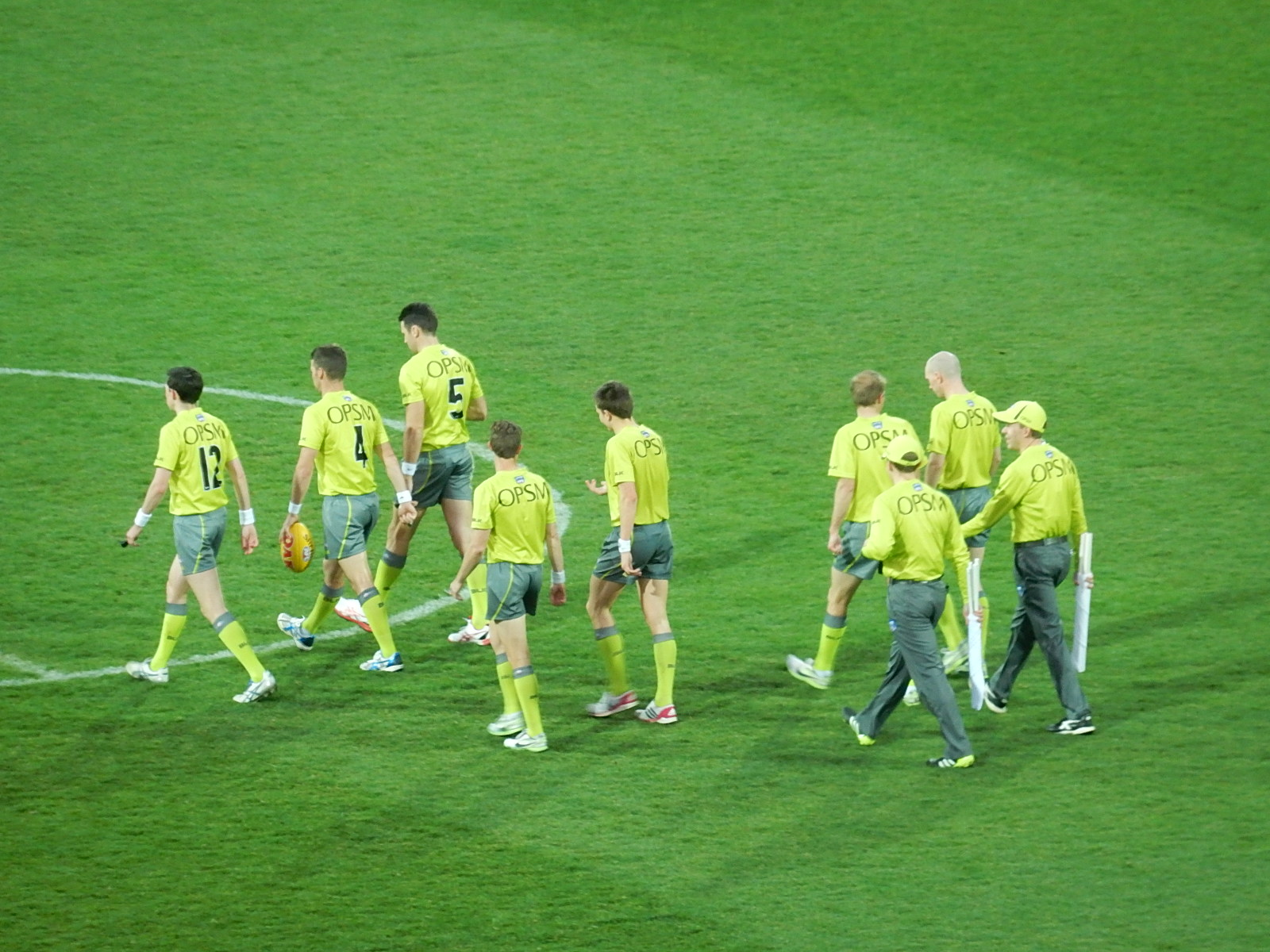
Umpires

Each game is officiated by at least five match officials, known as an umpire. These match officials are placed into three categories based upon their roles and responsibilities, with varying minimum numbers of Umpires required depending on position:

- Field umpire: Field umpires are positioned within the playing area contained within the Boundary Lines, and are the primary match officials. A minimum of one field umpire is required to officiate the match, though it is common practice to employ more to reduce physical demand on individual umpires, and improve officiation quality.
- Boundary umpires: Boundary umpires are positioned along the two boundary lines upon either side of the field. Their primary duties include determining when the football is deemed to be outside of the field of play, and to throw the football back into play when directed. A minimum of two boundary umpires are required for a match.
- Goal umpires: Goal umpires are positioned at either end of the ground, with one stationed at either set of goal posts on the field. Their primary duties include judging what scores made by players, signalling scores, and recording scores made by each team during a match. A minimum of two goal umpires are required for a match.

At AFL level, a video score review system is utilised. Only umpires are permitted to request a review, and only scoring shots and potential scoring shots are permitted to be reviewed.

=== Game skills ===
==== Ball movement ====
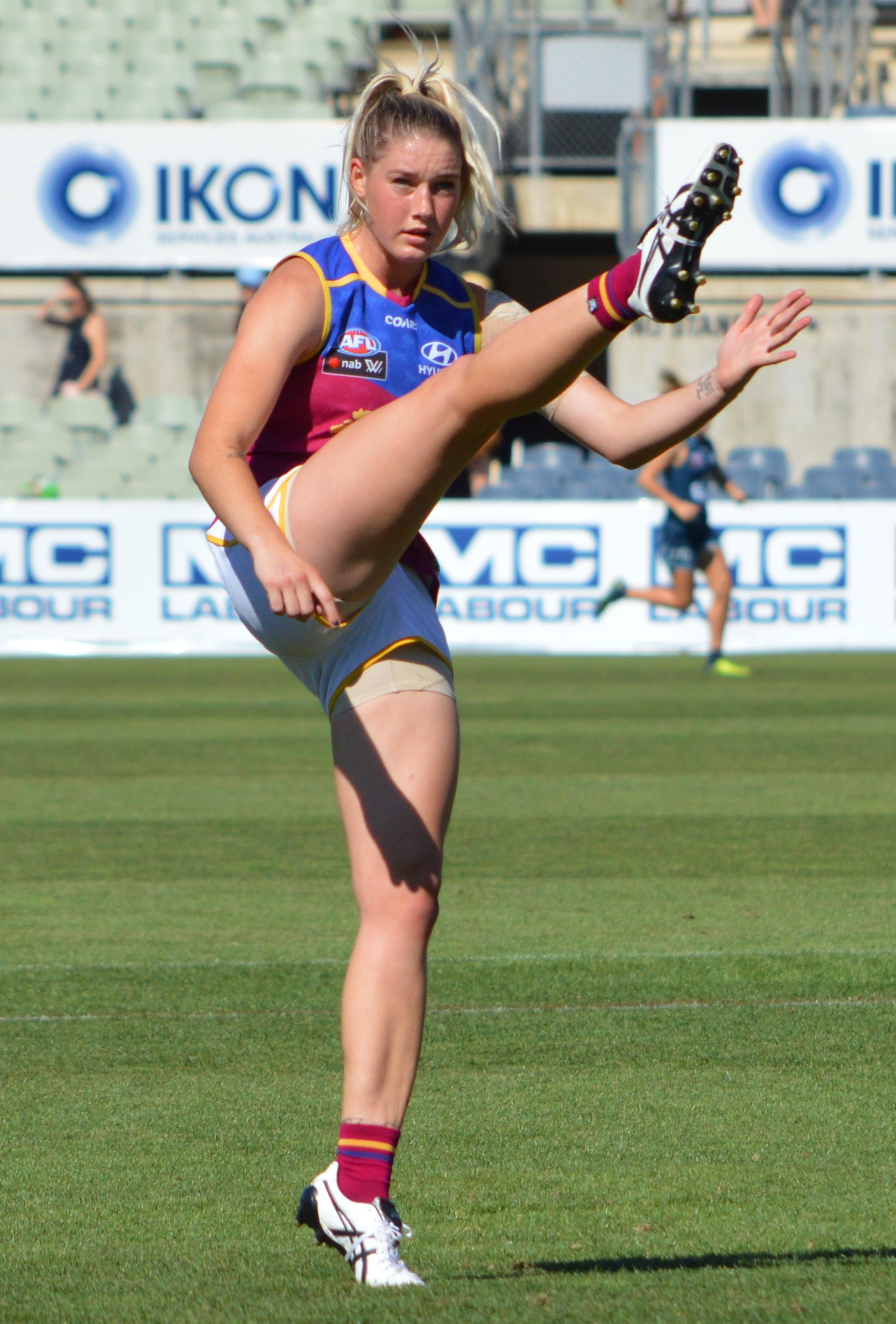
Kicking

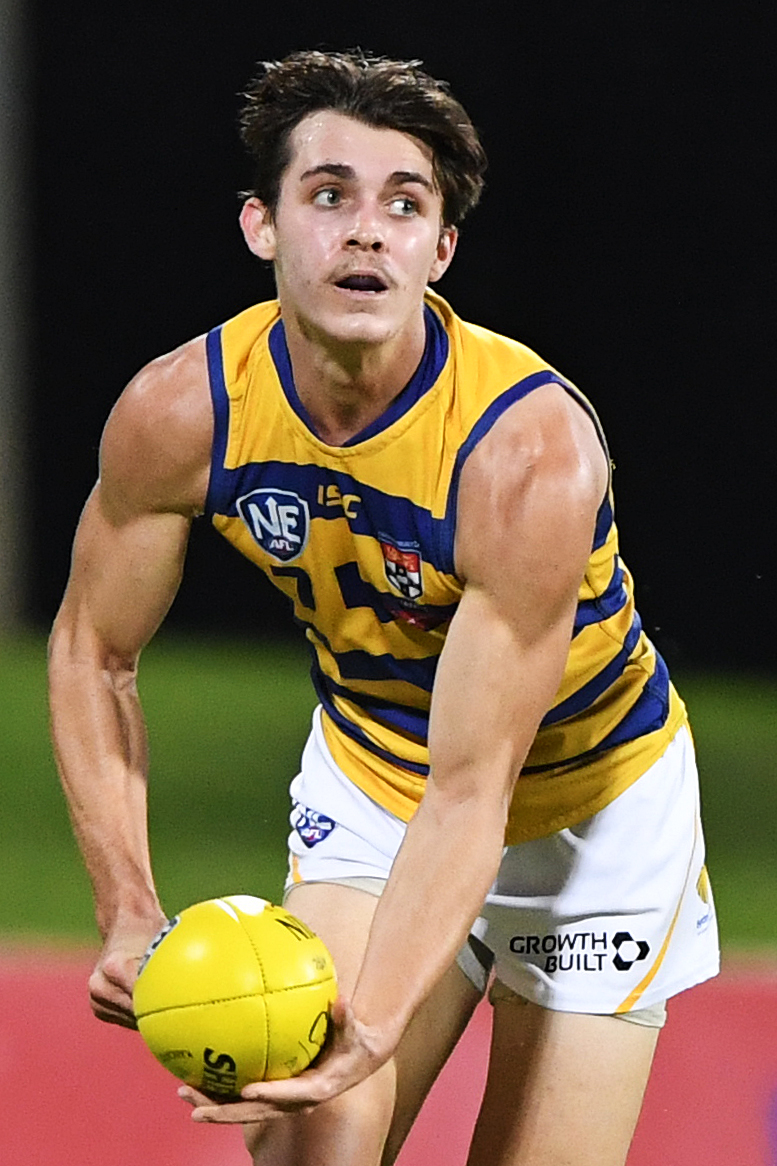
Handballing

A football may only be propelled forward in a select few ways as defined by the Laws of Australian Football, published by the AFL. The ball can be propelled in any direction by way of a kick or a clenched fist (called the handball or handpass)—deemed a correct disposal. Failure to dispose of the ball in one of these two methods will result in a free kick to the opposing team. If the ball is not currently in a player's possession, it can be moved legally through the usage of other means, such as punching. While in possession of the ball, players may run with the ball, but are required to either bounce or touch the ball on the ground at least once every 15 metres (16 yd).

==== Tackling ====
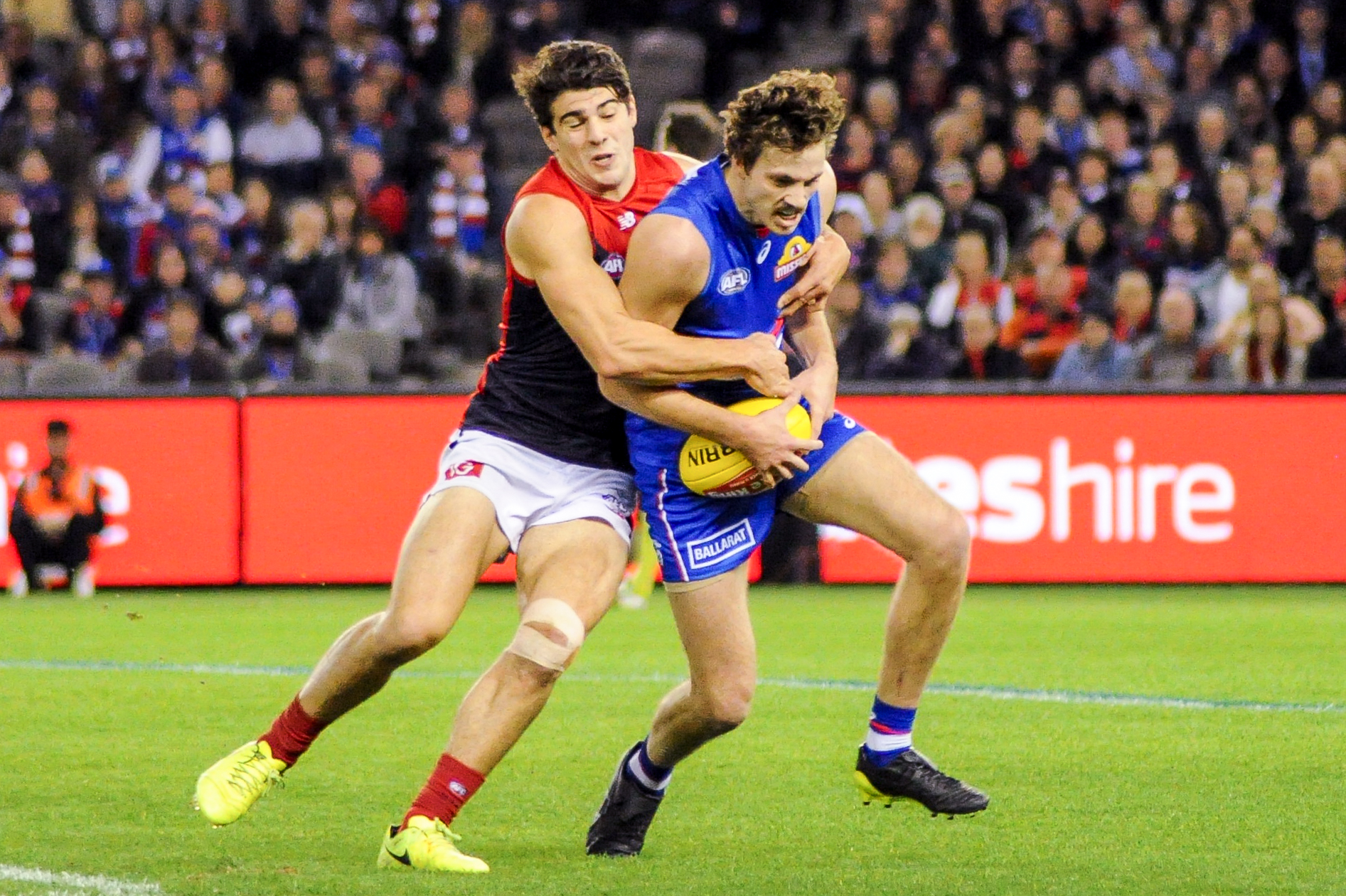
Tackling

Tackling is a technique employed by players used to force opposition players to dispose of the ball when they are in possession. Failure to dispose of the ball when legally tackled may see the player penalised for 'holding the ball', except if the umpire deems there was a lack of prior opportunity to do so.

The ball carrier may only be tackled between the shoulders and knees from the front or side. If the player forcefully contacts the opposing in the back while performing a tackle, the opposition player will be penalised for a push in the back. If the opposition tackles the player with possession below the knees (a low tackle or a trip) or above the shoulders (a high tackle), the team with possession of the football gets a free kick. Furthermore, tackles deemed to be dangerous by the umpire and those conducted from front-on while an opposition player has their head over the football are deemed to be prohibited contact, and will incur a free kick against the offending player.

Additionally, players may perform a technique known shepherding when the ball is within 5 metres (5.5 yd) of an opposition player. Shepherding involves the use of a player's body to push, bump or otherwise block an opposition player, providing they do not have possession of the ball.

==== Marking ====
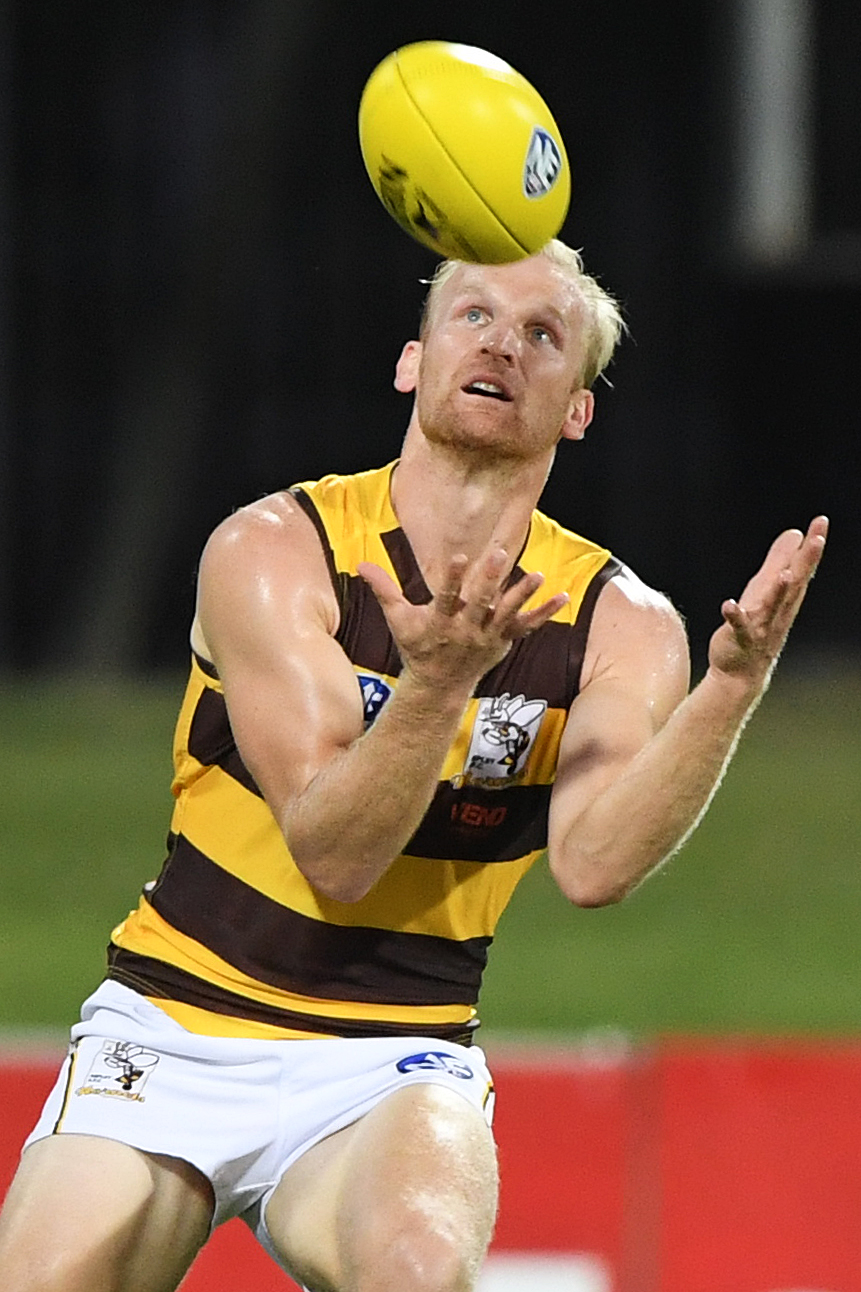
A player taking a mark on the chest

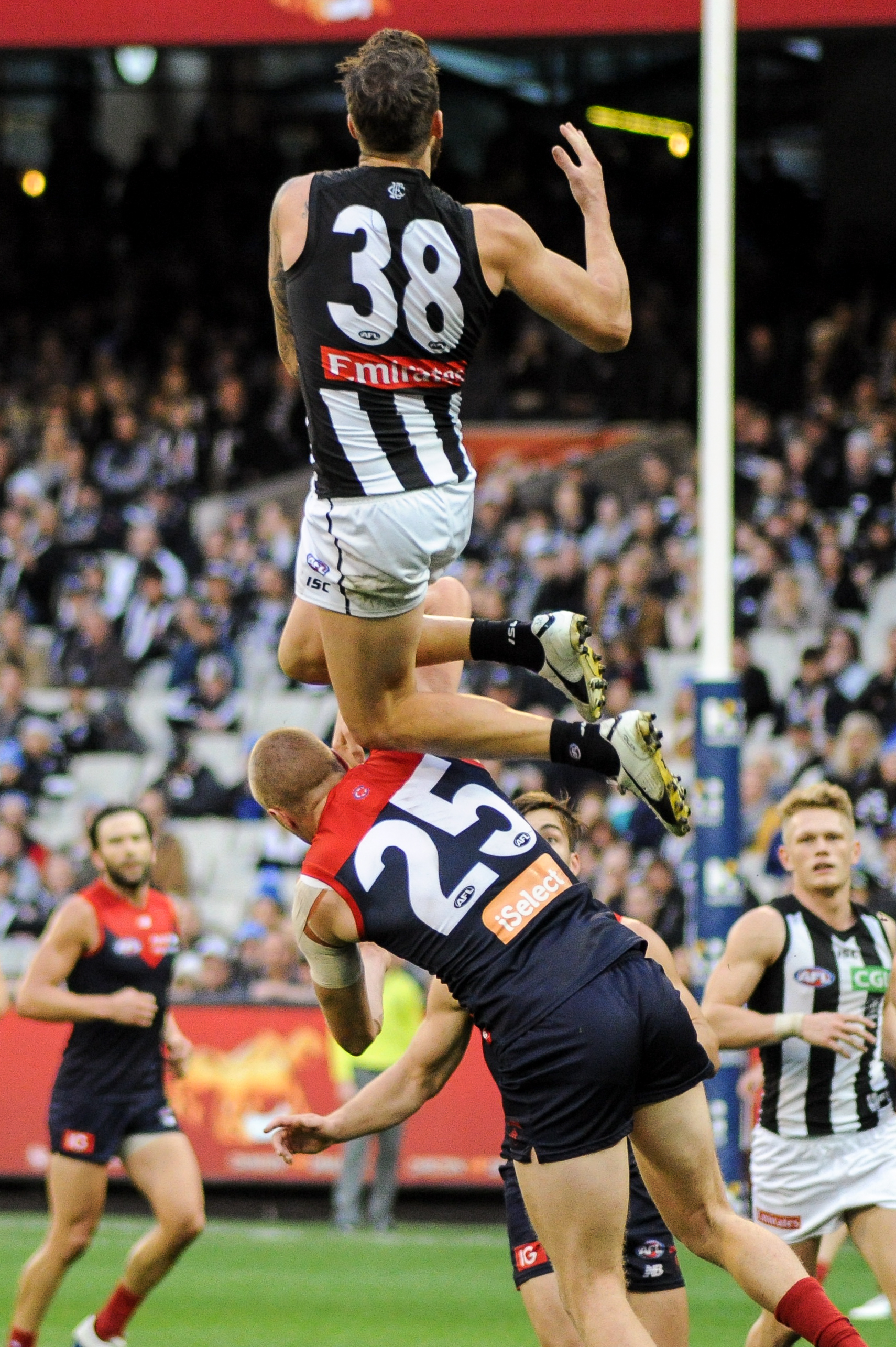
A player leaping to take a spectacular mark

If a player takes possession of the ball that has travelled more than 15 metres (16 yd) from another player's kick, by way of a catch within the field of play, it is deemed as a mark. To be awarded a mark, it must be deemed that the player sufficiently controlled the ball and took possession prior to it being touched, touching the ground, or in the case of a contest, being spoiled by an opponent. Upon a mark being taken, one opposition player may choose to stand on the point on the field where the mark was taken, known as "the mark". When a mark is taken, a small protected zone is established on the field, extending 10 metres (11 yd) either side of "the mark" and the player who marked the ball, with a small protected corridor between "the mark" and the player. The opposition player is permitted to jump, but is not allowed to move from their position on "the mark". Any other movements result in a distance penalty (50 metres in the AFL). The player who was awarded the mark may then choose to either dispose of the ball over "the mark" or may choose to attempt disposal via a different method, in which case the field umpire will call "play on"—a verbal instruction to continue play. "Play on" may also be called if the umpire deems the player awarded the mark to be taking an unreasonable amount of time to dispose of the football.

Once the player has disposed of the ball, or "play on" is called, normal play resumes.

==== Rucking ====
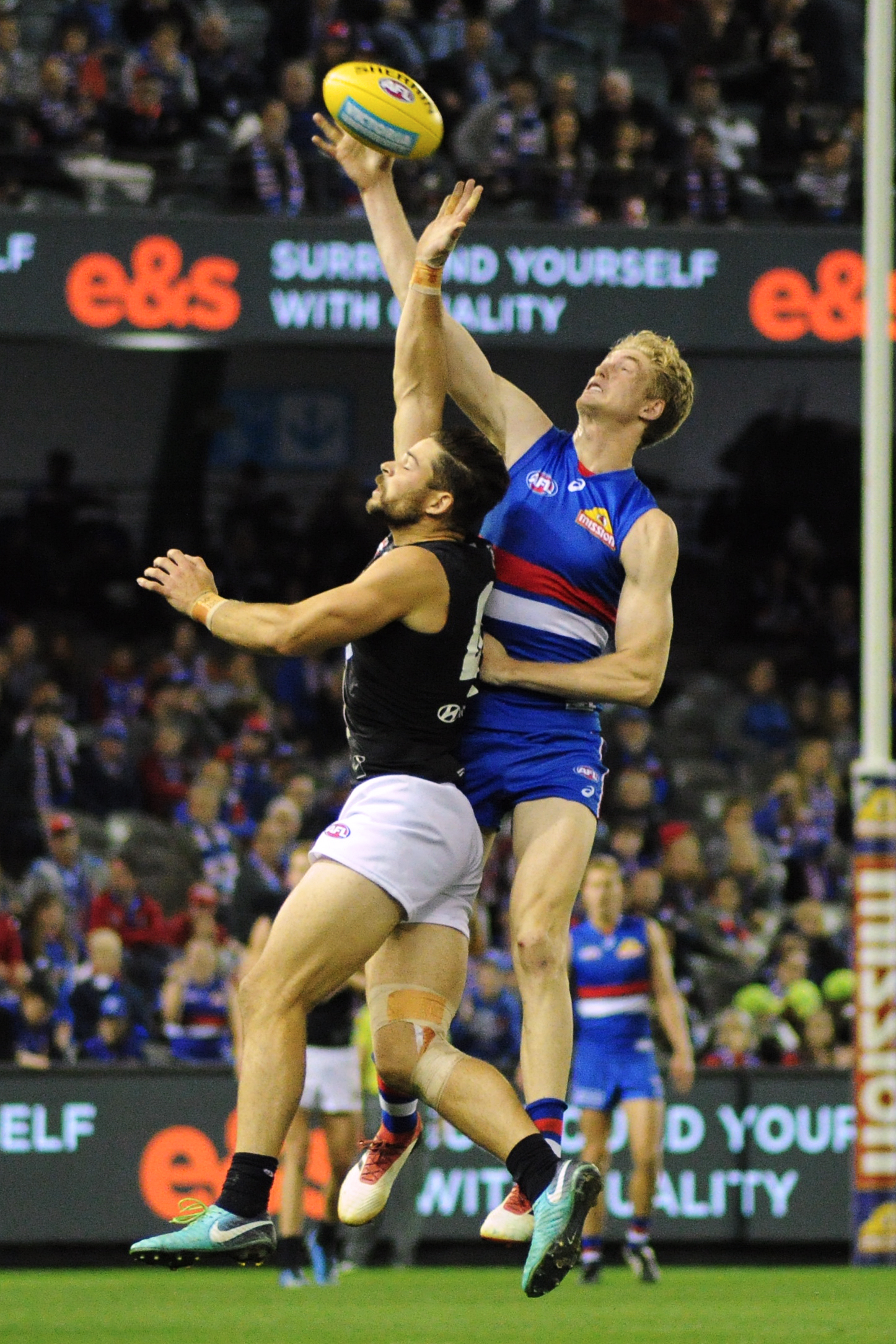
Rucking

Rucking is the only specialist skill and is performed by a ruck, the term for designated players from each side to which the umpire sends the ball to commence play. Only a nominated ruck may contest ball-ups and throw-ins. They are the only player allowed within the 10 metre circle at a centre bounce. Functionally the role is analogous to a basketball centre and as such rucks are typically the tallest player on the team. Lifting teammates is not allowed so the ruck may only jump to reach the ball. If the ruck does not take possession of the football, it must be tapped or fisted, which is known as a hit-out. An effective hit-out that passes the ball to a teammate is known as a hit-out to advantage.

=== Misconduct ===
In the event a player breaks a rule, a free kick is awarded to the opposing team, from the location that the misconduct occurred, or the ball's current location—whichever is closer to the team's scoring zone. As when a mark is taken, this location is called "the mark", and the same protections regarding the space apply.

In the event a player engages in unsportsmanlike conduct after a free kick has been awarded or a mark has been paid to the opposing team, the umpire may instead award a 50-metre penalty. When imposed, the field umpire will advance "the mark" an additional 50 metres (55 yd) down the field or to the goal line, whichever is closer. Additional 50-metre penalties may be awarded if the behaviour continues after the initial penalty.

The laws of the game allow umpires to send off players for egregious foul play, although this law does not apply to the AFL and is largely only used at the local level.

=== Scoring ===
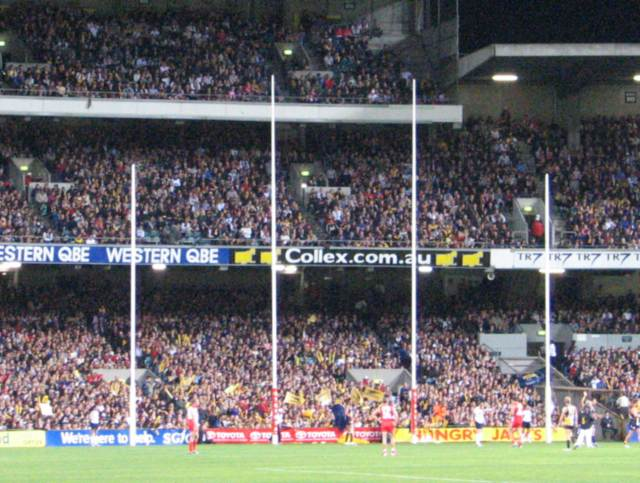
The two tall central posts are the goal posts, and the two shorter outer posts are the behind posts.

There are two types of scoring shots in Australian rules football: goals and behinds. A goal is worth six points, and is scored when the football is propelled between the goal posts and across the goal line at any height by way of a kick from the attacking team. It may touch the ground, but must not have been touched by any player from either team or a goalpost prior to crossing the goal line.

A behind is worth one point and is scored when:

- The ball passes between a goal post and a behind post at any height.
- The ball hits a goal post.
- Any player sends the ball across the goal or behind line by touching it with any part of the body other than a foot or lower leg.

A behind is also awarded to the team if the ball touches any part of an opposition player, including a foot, before passing across their goal or behind line. A free kick is awarded against any player who is deemed to have deliberately rushed a behind.

The team that has scored the most points at the end of play wins the game. If the scores are level on points at the end of play, then the game is a draw; extra time applies only during finals matches in some competitions.

As an example of a score report, consider a match between Sydney and Geelong with the former as the home team. Sydney's score of 17 goals and 5 behinds equates to 107 points. Geelong's score of 10 goals and 17 behinds equates to a 77-point tally. Sydney wins the match by a margin of 30 points. Such a result would be written as:

"Sydney 17.5 (107) defeated Geelong 10.17 (77)".

And spoken as:

"Sydney, seventeen-five, one hundred and seven, defeated Geelong, ten-seventeen, seventy-seven".

Additionally, it can be said that:

"Sydney defeated Geelong by 30 points".

The home team is typically listed first and the visiting side is listed second.

A draw would be written as:

"Greater Western Sydney 10.8 (68) drew with Geelong 10.8 (68)".

== Governing bodies and competitions ==
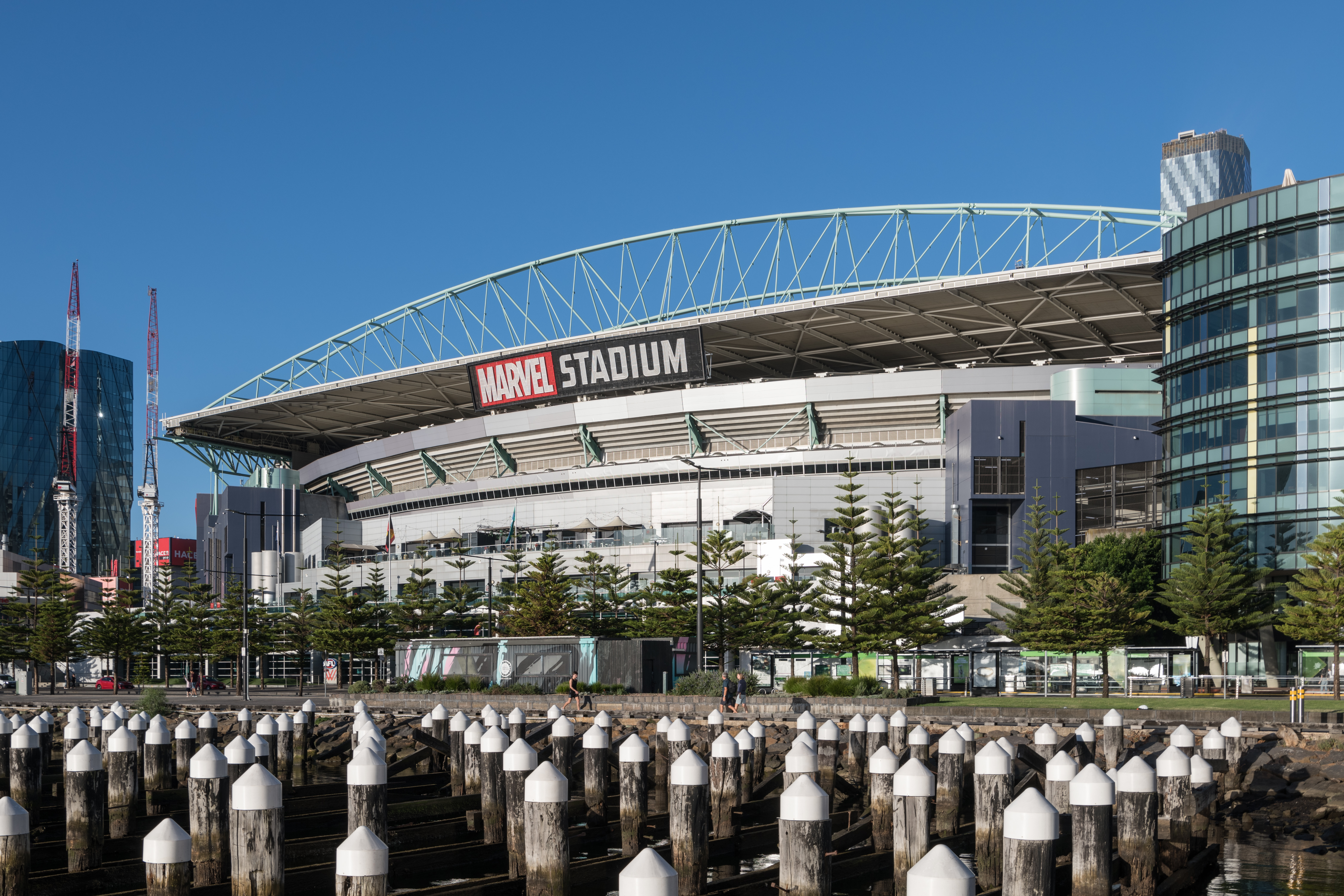
The AFL owns and is headquartered at Melbourne's Docklands Stadium.

The football season proper is from March to August (early autumn to late winter in Australia), with finals being held in September and October. In the tropics, the game is sometimes played in the wet season (October to March).

The AFL is recognised by the Australian Sports Commission as being the National Sporting Organisation for Australian rules. There are also seven state/territory-based organisations in Australia, all of which are affiliated with the AFL. These state leagues hold annual semi-professional club competitions, with some also overseeing more than one league. Local semi-professional or amateur organisations and competitions are often affiliated to their state organisations.

In 2003, the AFL became the de facto world governing body for Australian rules football when it pushed for the closure of the International Australian Football Council. There are also a number of affiliated organisations governing amateur clubs and competitions around the world.

In Australian football club competitions, the aim is to win the premiership (also known as the "flag"), which is typically decided by a finals series. The teams that occupy the highest positions on the ladder after the home-and-away season play-off in a "semi-knockout" finals series, culminating in a single Grand Final match to determine the premiers. Between four and eight teams contest a finals series, typically using the AFL final eight system or a variation of the McIntyre system. The team which finishes first on the ladder after the home-and-away season is referred to as the "minor premier", but this usually holds little stand-alone significance, other than receiving a better draw in the finals.

Some metropolitan leagues have several tiered divisions, with promotion of the lower division premiers and relegation of the upper division's last placed team at the end of each year.

== Women and Australian rules ==
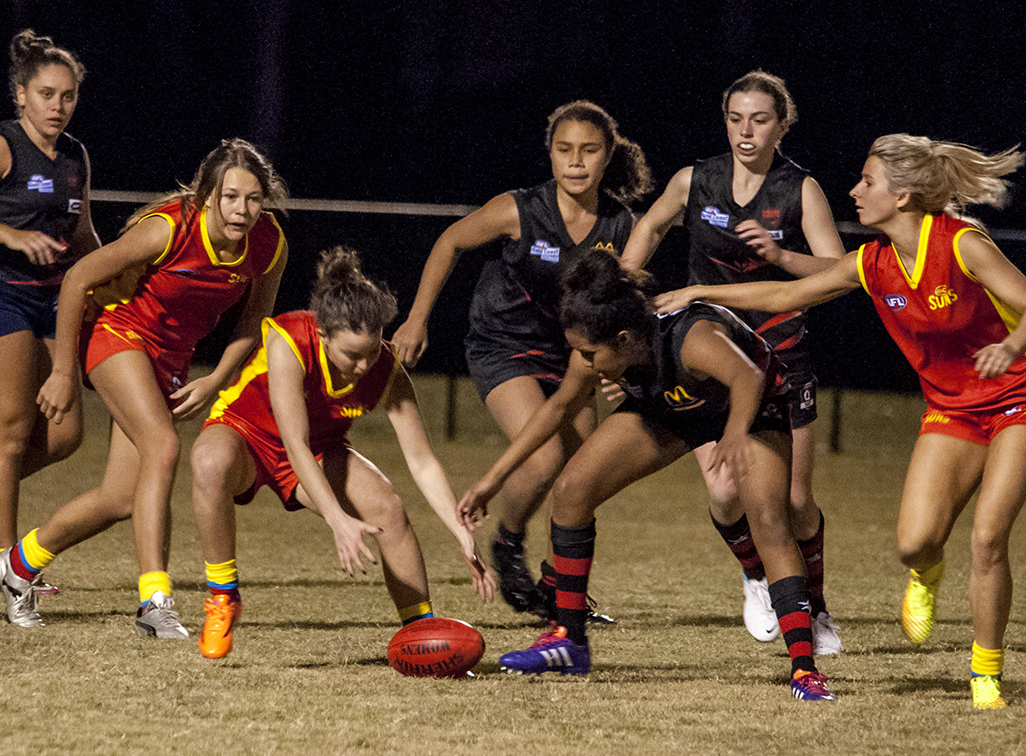
A women's match between Bond University and Burleigh Heads on the Gold Coast, Queensland

The high level of interest shown by women in Australian rules football is considered unique among the world's football codes. It was the case in the 19th century, as it is in modern times, that women made up approximately half of total attendances at Australian rules football matches—a far greater proportion than, for example, the estimated 10 per cent of women that comprise British soccer crowds. This has been attributed in part to the egalitarian character of Australian rules football's early years in public parks where women could mingle freely and support the game in various ways.

In terms of participation, there are occasional 19th-century references to women playing the sport, but it was not until the 1910s that the first organised women's teams and competitions appeared. Women's state leagues emerged in the 1980s, and in 2013, the AFL announced plans to establish a national semi-professional women's competition. Amidst a surge in viewing interest and participation in women's football, the AFL pushed the founding date of the competition, named AFL Women's (AFLW), to 2017. Eight AFL clubs won licences to field sides in its inaugural season.

By 2022, all 18 clubs fielded an AFLW side, and there will be 19 teams with the admission of Tasmania to the competition in 2028.

== Variations and related sports ==
Many related games have emerged from Australian rules football, mainly with variations of contact to encourage greater participation. These include Auskick (played by children aged between 5 and 12), kick-to-kick (and its variants end-to-end footy and marks up), rec footy, 9-a-side footy, masters Australian football, handball and longest-kick competitions. Players outside Australia sometimes engage in related games adapted to available fields, like metro footy (played on gridiron fields) and Samoa rules (played on rugby fields). One such prominent example in use since 2018 is AFLX, a shortened variation of the game with seven players a side, played on a soccer-sized pitch.

=== International rules football ===
The similarities between Australian rules football and the Irish sport of Gaelic football have allowed for the creation of a hybrid code known as international rules football. The first international rules matches were contested in Ireland during the 1967 Australian Football World Tour. Since then, various sets of compromise rules have been trialed, and in 1984 the International Rules Series commenced with national representative sides selected by Australia's state leagues (later by the AFL) and the Gaelic Athletic Association (GAA). The competition became an annual event in 1998, but was postponed indefinitely in 2007 when the GAA pulled out due to Australia's severe and aggressive style of play. It resumed in Australia in 2008 under new rules to protect the player with the ball.

== Global reach ==
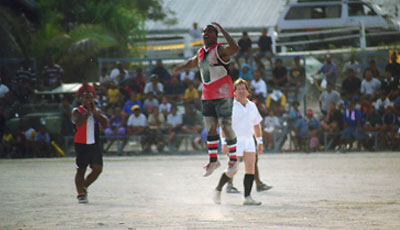
Australian football match at Linkbelt Oval in Nauru, where Australian rules football is the national sport

During the colonial period, Australian rules was sometimes referred to as Australasian rules, reflecting its popularity in New Zealand. The game was played outside Australasia as early as 1888 when Australians studying at Edinburgh University and London University formed teams and competed in London. Further international exposure came that same year, when the first British rugby side to tour the Southern Hemisphere played Australian rules matches in both Australia and New Zealand. By the early 20th century, it had spread with the Australian diaspora to South Africa, the United States and other parts of the Anglosphere; however this growth went into rapid decline during and after World War I, leading also to a decades long hiatus in New Zealand. After World War II, it experienced growth in the Pacific region, particularly in Papua New Guinea and Nauru, where it is now the national sport.

Today, the sport is played at an amateur level in various countries throughout the world. Twenty-three countries have participated in the Australian Football International Cup, which was held triennially in Australia from 2002 to 2017. International competition resumed in 2024 with three regional tournaments: the Transatlantic Cup, Asia Cup, and Pacific Cup. Nine countries have also participated in the AFL Europe Championship. In 2013, participation across AFL Europe's 21 member nations was more than 5,000 players, the majority of which are European nationals rather than Australian expats. The sport also has a growing presence in India. Over 20 countries have either affiliation or working agreements with the AFL.

Most present-day international amateur clubs and leagues are based in North America, Europe and Asia, with the oldest typically having originated in the 1980s. That decade, the sport developed a cult following in the United States when matches were broadcast on the fledgling ESPN network. Growing international interest has been assisted by exhibition matches, players switching between football codes, and Australia's multicultural makeup. Many VFL/AFL players were born overseas, with a growing number recruited through various initiatives. One notable example is the Irish experiment, which, since the 1980s, has seen many Gaelic footballers leave the amateur GAA to play Australian rules professionally. This has expanded to women's football, with 39 Irish players on AFLW lists for the 2025 season.

Although Australian rules football is not an Olympic sport, it was showcased at the MCG as part of the 1956 Summer Olympics, held in Melbourne. In addition, when Brisbane hosted the 1982 Commonwealth Games, an exhibition match between Richmond and Carlton was held at the Gabba.

== Cultural influence and popularity ==
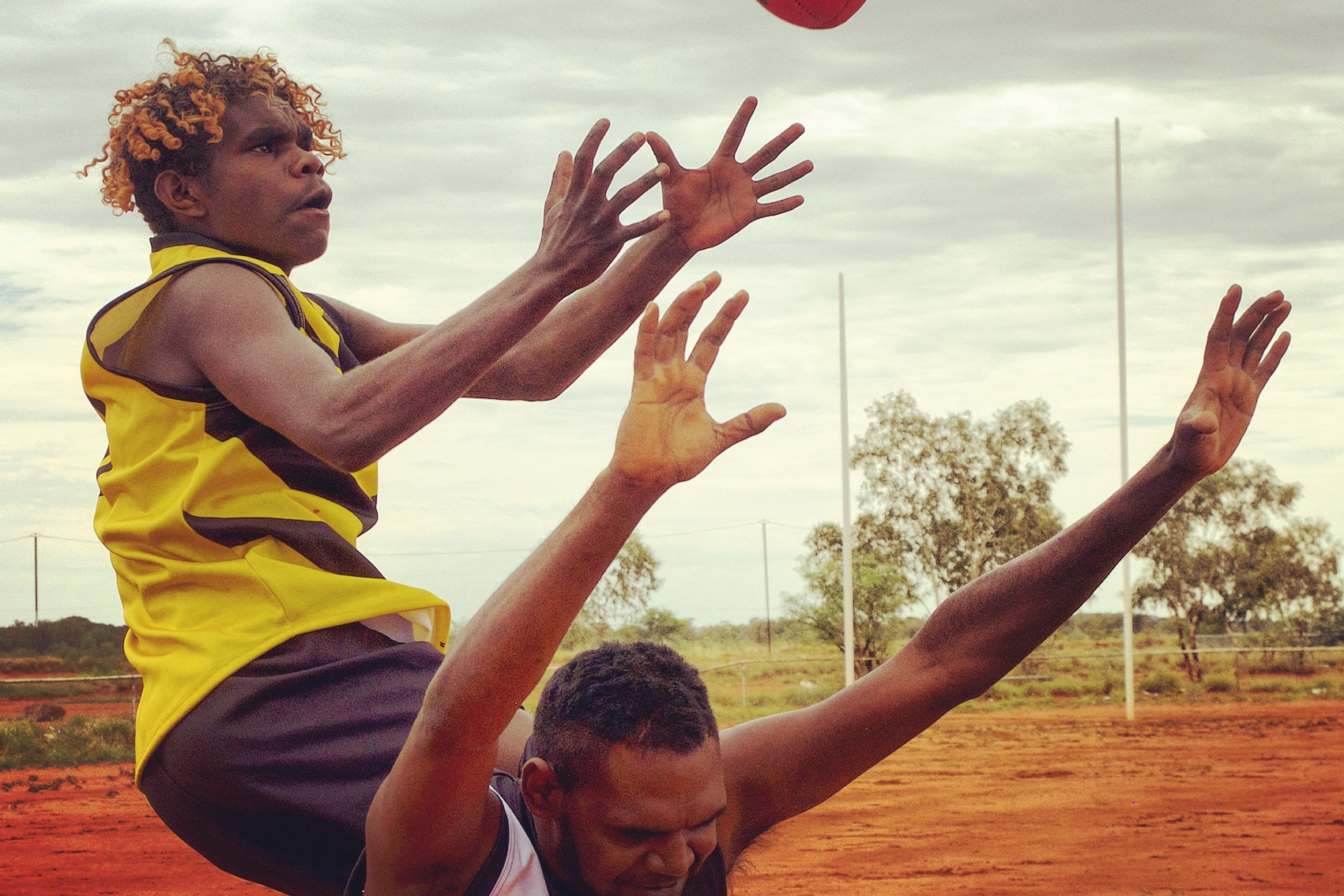
Australian rules football is popular among Indigenous communities.

Australian rules football has attracted more overall interest among Australians than any other football code.

The 2024 AFL season saw an average attendance of 38,344 fans per match, making the AFL Australia's, and one of the world's best-attended sports leagues. Also that year, data indicated 1,319,687 people, or 1 in 20 Australians, are members of an AFL club. The most-visited sports website in Australia in 2023 was the AFL's, attracting 1.89 billion total visits.

Approximately 40% of Australians aged 14+ watch AFL matches on TV either occasionally or regularly. The 2024 AFL Grand Final was that year's highest-rating free-to-air television broadcast in Australia, with an in-home audience of 4 million watching Seven's coverage; overall TV viewership reached at least 7,569,000. The AFL's current TV broadcasting rights deal with Seven and Foxtel is worth an Australian record $4.5 billion.

In terms of participation, there were at least 581,000 registered players in Australia in 2024. This figure encompasses community football at junior, youth, and senior levels, as well as programs such as Footy 9s. Among Australian children aged 0–14, it is the fifth most common sporting activity, behind swimming, soccer, basketball and gymnastics. Women and girls account for 20% of all community football registrations.

=== In the arts and popular culture ===
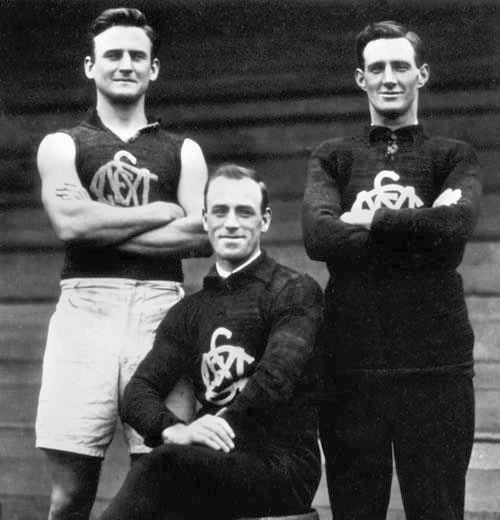
South Melbourne's ruck combination of the 1920s, left to right: Mark Tandy, Fred Fleiter and Roy Cazaly. Fleiter coined the phrase "Up there, Cazaly!" as a signal for Cazaly to leap for the ball. It entered popular idiom as a phrase of encouragement, and was used as a battle cry by Australian soldiers during World War II. It remains well known through Mike Brady's 1979 Australian football anthem of the same name.

Australian rules football has inspired works by many writers and poets, including C. J. Dennis, Helen Garner, Peter Goldsworthy and Kerry Greenwood. Historians Manning Clarke and Geoffrey Blainey have also written extensively on the sport. Slang within Australian rules football has impacted Australian English more broadly, with a number of expressions taking on new meanings in non-sporting contexts, e.g., to "get a guernsey" is to gain recognition or approval, while "shirt-fronting" someone is to accost them.

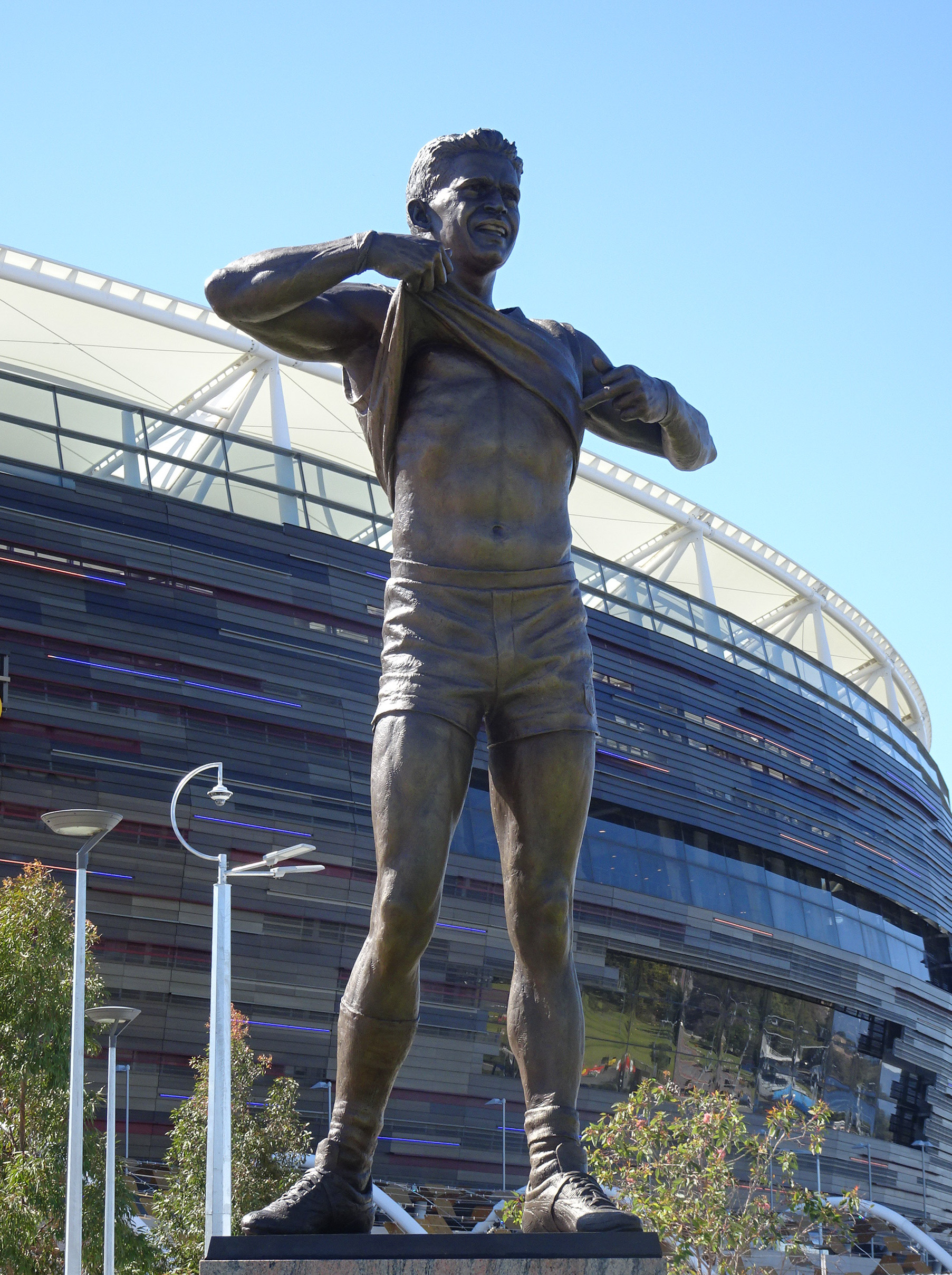
Statue of Indigenous Hall of Famer Nicky Winmar pointing to his skin in 1993 in protest of racial vilification, erected outside Perth Stadium in 2019

In 1889, Australian impressionist painter Arthur Streeton captured football games en plein air for the 9 by 5 Impression Exhibition, titling one work The National Game. Paintings by Sidney Nolan (Footballer, 1946) and John Brack (Three of the Players, 1953) helped to establish Australian rules football as a serious subject for modernists, and many Aboriginal artists have explored the game, often fusing it with the mythology of their region. Vincent Namatjira won the 2020 Archibald Prize for his portrait of Adam Goodes.

In cartooning, WEG's VFL/AFL premiership posters—inaugurated in 1954—have achieved iconic status among Australian football fans. Australian rules football statues can be found throughout the country, some based on famous photographs, among them Haydn Bunton Sr.'s leap, Jack Dyer's charge and Nicky Winmar lifting his jumper. In the 1980s, a group of postmodern architects based in Melbourne began incorporating references to Australian rules football into their buildings, an example being Building 8 by Edmond and Corrigan.

Dance sequences based on Australian rules football feature heavily in Robert Helpmann's 1964 ballet The Display, his first and most famous work for The Australian Ballet. The game has also inspired well-known plays such as And the Big Men Fly (1963) by Alan Hopgood and David Williamson's The Club (1977), which was adapted into a 1980 film, directed by Bruce Beresford. Mike Brady's 1979 hit "Up There Cazaly" is considered an Australian football anthem, and references to the sport can be found in works by popular musicians, from singer-songwriter Paul Kelly to the alternative rock band TISM. Others, such as Tame Impala's Kevin Parker, have written songs for their favourite AFL club. Many Australian rules football video games have been released, notably the AFL series.

== Australian Football Hall of Fame ==
For the centenary of the VFL/AFL in 1996, the Australian Football Hall of Fame was established. That year, 136 significant figures across the various competitions were inducted into the Hall of Fame. Each years since the creation of the Hall of Fame, a panel selects a small group of players they deem worthy for this prestigious honour, resulting in a total number of more than 300 inductees as of 2024.

In addition to the Hall of Fame, select members are chosen to receive the elite Legend status. Due to restrictions limiting the number of Legend status players to 10% of the total number of Hall of Fame inductees, there are currently only 32 players with the status in the Hall of Fame as of 2024.

== See also ==
- Australian rules football attendance records
- Australian rules football positions
- List of Australian rules football clubs
- List of Australian rules football rivalries
- List of Australian rules football terms
- Gridiron football
