= Felix Russo =

Australian rules footballer (1926–2005)

Personal information
- Full name: Felice Angelo Russo
- Born: 10 June 1926
- Died: 15 February 2005 (aged 78)
- Original team: Elwood CYMS (CYMSFA)
- Height: 178 cm (5 ft 10 in)
- Weight: 76 kg (168 lb)

Playing career^{1}
Years	Club	Games (Goals)
1950–1951	St Kilda	14 (1)
- ^{1} Playing statistics correct to the end of 1951.

Felice Angelo "Felix" Russo (10 June 1926 – 15 February 2005) was an Australian rules footballer who played with St Kilda in the Victorian Football League (VFL). He had a son, father-in-law, two sons-in-law and three grandchildren who have all played VFL/AFL football.

== Biography ==
=== Football ===
Educated at De La Salle College, Russo captained his school to a premiership in 1944. He was recruited from CYMS Football Association (CYMSFA) club Elwood CYMS and also played some of his early football for Footscray Technical School Old Boys.

Russo, who worked as a physical education instructor, debuted for St Kilda at the age of 23 in the 1950 VFL season. Used as a wingman, he played eight games in his first season of VFL football. In the 1951 season he made six appearances for St Kilda.

Following his two seasons at St Kilda, Russo played with Victorian Football Association (VFA) club Sandringham. He won the club's best and fairest award in the 1953 VFA season. Under the coaching of Tommy Lahiff, Russo captained Sandringham in 1954.

=== Personal life ===
Russo is of Italian descent. His father was born in Italy, as were his maternal grandparents.

He is related to many past and present league footballers. His son, Peter Russo, was a member of two Hawthorn premiership teams and also played for St Kilda.

One of his daughters, Bernadette, married Hawthorn player John Kennedy, Jr, who is the son of legendary Hawthorn coach John Kennedy Sr. John and Bernadette had a son, Josh Kennedy, who plays for the Sydney Swans.

Another daughter, Jenny, also married a footballer, Richmond and South Melbourne defender Ray Ball. Two of Ray's sons, Luke and Matthew, played in the AFL.
