= Josh Kennedy (footballer, born 1988) =

Australian rules footballer

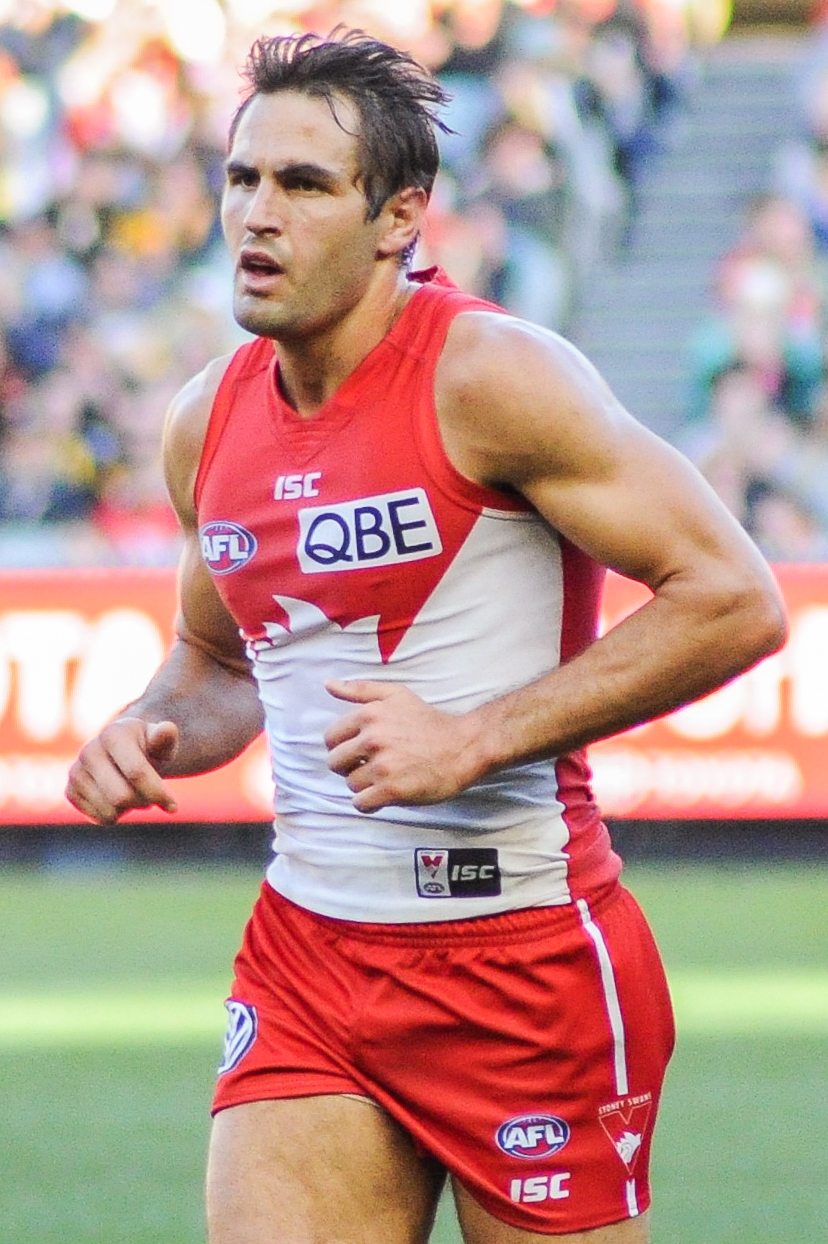
- Kennedy playing for Sydney in June 2017

Personal information
- Full name: Joshua P. Kennedy
- Born: 20 June 1988 (age 38); Melbourne, Victoria
- Original team: Ashburton United (WJFA)/Xavier College (APS)/Sandringham Dragons (TAC Cup)
- Draft: No. 40 (F/S), 2006 national draft
- Debut: Round 9, 2008, Hawthorn vs. Melbourne, at Melbourne Cricket Ground
- Height: 189 cm (6 ft 2 in)
- Weight: 97 kg (214 lb)
- Position: Midfielder

Playing career^{1}
Years	Club	Games (Goals)
2007–2009	Hawthorn	13 (4)
2010–2022	Sydney	277 (153)
Total		290 (157)
- ^{1} Playing statistics correct to the end of 2022.

Career highlights
- AFL premiership player: 2012; Sydney captain: 2017–2021; 3× All-Australian team: 2012, 2014, 2016; 3× Bob Skilton Medal: 2012, 2015, 2016; Gary Ayres Award: 2016; Peter Badcoe VC Medal: 2012

Joshua P. Kennedy (born 20 June 1988) is a former Australian rules footballer who played for the Sydney Swans in the Australian Football League (AFL). He previously played for the Hawthorn Football Club.

The son and grandson of former Hawthorn players, Kennedy was originally recruited to Hawthorn in the 2006 national draft under the father–son rule. He debuted for the club during the 2008 season, but was traded to Sydney prior to the 2010 season, having played 13 games for Hawthorn. An inside midfielder, Kennedy became a star player for Sydney. He has won the Bob Skilton Medal three times as the club's best and fairest (2012, 2015, 2016) and also played in a premiership in 2012. Kennedy has been named in the All-Australian team on three occasions (2012, 2014, 2016) in addition to finishing third in the 2014 and 2017 Brownlow Medal counts. He was the captain of Sydney since the 2017 season, until Kennedy stepped down from the role in February 2022.

== Early years ==
Kennedy is the son of John Kennedy Jr., a former Hawthorn player, and the grandson of John Kennedy Sr., an Australian Football Hall of Fame member.

His mother Bernadette (née Russo) is the sister of former Hawthorn player Peter Russo. His grandfather Felix Russo also played for St Kilda.

Luke Ball and Matthew Ball are his first cousins; their mother is Jenny Russo, sister of Kennedy's mother.

He graduated from Xavier College in Kew in 2006, having also played for the Ashburton United Junior Football Club (Ashy Redbacks) in the Waverley Junior Football Association (WJFA) as a youngster.

== AFL career ==
=== Hawthorn (2008–2009) ===
In mid-2006 it was announced that he would be recruited in the 2006 AFL draft by the Hawthorn Football Club for the 2007 season, under the father–son rule. Kennedy made his debut for the club in round nine of the 2008 season. He played 2 further games in his debut season, and 10 the following season, but was traded to Sydney at the end of the 2009 season, along with Ben McGlynn, with Hawthorn receiving draft picks 39, 46, and 70 in exchange.

=== Sydney (2010–2022) ===
In late 2009, Kennedy was offered a three-year deal by the Sydney Swans. Kennedy accepted the offer. He was traded to the Swans along with teammate Ben McGlynn for 2009 AFL draft picks 39, 46 and 70. Kennedy finished 3rd in the Sydney Swans Best & Fairest, behind winner Kieren Jack and runner-up Shane Mumford. Kennedy was also awarded the Paul Roos Award for best player in the finals series.

Kennedy followed up his impressive debut year in Sydney with another very consistent season in 2011. Despite a relatively slow start, Kennedy hit top form in the 2nd half of the year to finish equal 2nd with Rhyce Shaw in the Bob Skilton Medal (behind winner Adam Goodes). Kennedy further enhanced his growing reputation around the league with 2 more impressive performances in the Swans' finals games against St.Kilda and Hawthorn.

Kennedy had his most consistent year in 2012 earning himself his first All-Australian team selection. Kennedy won the Brett Kirk Medal in round one. Kennedy polled in equal eighth place in the Brownlow Medal, with 19 votes - the most of any Sydney player. He played in Sydney's Grand Final winning team, where he had 26 disposals and kicked two goals. He also won the Sydney Best & Fairest (Bob Skilton Medal) with (877) votes to win by a massive 172 votes from 2nd Ted Richards (705) and 3rd Ryan O'Keefe (701), managing to consistently poll votes in each round.

Kennedy's 2015 season was rewarded with his second Bob Skilton Medal. He won the best and fairest for the second consecutive year in 2016.

In 2016, Kennedy won his 3rd All-Australian selection, 3rd Bob Skilton Medal and was awarded the inaugural Gary Ayres Award for best player in the 2016 finals series.

On 9 December 2016, Kennedy was named the new captain of the club, taking over from previous co-captains Kieren Jack and Jarrad McVeigh. He finished third in the 2017 Brownlow Medal, polling more votes than any other Sydney player.

On 25 June 2020, Kennedy played his 250th AFL game against the Western Bulldogs at the Sydney Cricket Ground; his grandfather John Kennedy Sr. died one day before the game, aged 91.

On 8 August 2022, Kennedy announced that he would retire at the conclusion of the season.

On Saturday 26th April 2025, Kennedy will play for his old school club, Xavier College against Haileybury in a return to football.

== Statistics ==
Updated to the end of 2022.

Legend
G	Goals	K	Kicks	D	Disposals	T	Tackles
B	Behinds	H	Handballs	M	Marks
#	Played in that season's premiership team	†	Led the league for the season

Season	Team	No.	Games	Totals							Averages (per game)							Votes
Season	Team	No.	Games	G	B	K	H	D	M	T	G	B	K	H	D	M	T	Votes
2007	Hawthorn	36	0	—	—	—	—	—	—	—	—	—	—	—	—	—	—	0
2008	Hawthorn	36	3	0	0	17	24	41	12	13	0.0	0.0	5.7	8.0	13.7	4.0	4.3	0
2009	Hawthorn	32	10	4	5	65	129	194	31	42	0.4	0.5	6.5	12.9	19.4	3.1	4.2	0
2010	Sydney	12	24	10	10	210	272	482	70	107	0.4	0.4	8.8	11.3	20.1	2.9	4.5	0
2011	Sydney	12	24	10	19	272	256	528	54	135	0.4	0.8	11.3	10.7	22.0	2.3	5.6	3
2012^{#}	Sydney	12	25	29	13	307	401^{†}	708	73	125	1.2	0.5	12.3	16.0	28.3	2.9	5.0	19
2013	Sydney	12	25	14	16	257	421^{†}	678	42	123	0.6	0.6	10.3	16.8^{†}	27.1	1.7	4.9	14
2014	Sydney	12	23	13	20	272	385^{†}	657	75	132	0.6	0.9	11.8	16.7^{†}	28.6	3.3	5.7	21
2015	Sydney	12	24	15	23	308	423	731	74	149	0.6	1.0	12.8	17.6	30.5	3.1	6.2	25
2016	Sydney	12	25	20	9	315	472^{†}	787	67	139	0.8	0.4	12.6	18.9	31.5	2.7	5.6	14
2017	Sydney	12	21	16	6	248	344	592	52	103	0.8	0.3	11.8	16.4	28.2	2.5	4.9	23
2018	Sydney	12	23	10	12	250	334	584	55	113	0.4	0.5	10.9	14.5	25.4	2.4	4.9	6
2019	Sydney	12	19	7	9	233	271	504	52	126	0.4	0.5	12.3	14.3	26.5	2.7	6.6	9
2020 (Note: The 2020 season was played with 17 home-and-away matches per team (down from 22) and 16-minute quarters with time on (down from 20-minute quarters with time on) due to the impact of the COVID-19 pandemic.)	Sydney	12	12	3	3	129	119	248	34	62	0.3	0.3	10.8	9.9	20.7	2.8	5.2	4
2021	Sydney	12	21	4	6	220	285	505	76	100	0.2	0.3	10.5	13.6	24.0	3.6	4.8	8
2022	Sydney	12	11	2	0	66	67	133	30	19	0.2	0.0	6.0	6.1	12.1	2.7	1.7	0
Career			290	157	151	3169	4203	7372	797	1488	0.5	0.5	10.9	14.5	25.4	2.7	5.1	146

== Honours and achievements ==
Sydney

- AFL premiership player: 2012
- 2× Minor premiership: 2014, 2016

Individual

- 3× All-Australian team: 2012, 2014, 2016
- 3× Bob Skilton Medal: 2012, 2015, 2016
- Sydney captain: 2017–2021
- Brett Kirk Medal: 2012 (round 1)
- Peter Badcoe VC Medal: 2012 (round 3)
- Gary Ayres Award: 2016
- Box Hill Hawks All-Stars team (1999–2019)

== Personal life ==
Kennedy's paternal grandmother has Italian heritage and referred to his late grandfather John Kennedy Sr. as Nonno. His mother Bernadette also has an Italian background. Through his mother, Kennedy is the grandson of former St Kilda footballer Felix Russo and nephew of former Hawthorn and St Kilda footballer Peter Russo. Kennedy is the first cousin of former St Kilda and Collingwood footballer Luke Ball.

He grew up in the Melbourne suburbs of Glen Iris and East Malvern.

In January 2012, Kennedy started dating Colombian native Ana Calle, who is four years his senior. In 2015, Calle gave birth to their first child, a boy. In November 2015, the couple married in Calle's hometown of Medellín. In 2019, Calle gave birth to their second child, a girl.
