= 2012 All-Australian team =

The 2012 All-Australian team represents the best performed Australian Football League (AFL) players during the 2012 season. It was announced on 17 September as a complete Australian rules football team of 22 players. The team is honorary and does not play any games.

== Selection panel ==
The selection panel for the 2012 All-Australian team consisted of chairman Andrew Demetriou, Adrian Anderson, Kevin Bartlett, Luke Darcy, Danny Frawley, Gerard Healy, Glen Jakovich and Mark Ricciuto.

== Team ==
=== Initial squad ===
At the conclusion of the 2012 AFL home and away season, a provisional squad of 40 players was chosen and later announced on 5 September.

Club	Total	Player(s)
Adelaide	5	Patrick Dangerfield, Sam Jacobs, Brent Reilly, Scott Thompson, Taylor Walker
Brisbane Lions	0	
Carlton	1	Eddie Betts
Collingwood	3	Dayne Beams, Scott Pendlebury, Dane Swan
Essendon	1	Jobe Watson
Fremantle	2	Luke McPharlin, Matthew Pavlich
Geelong	5	Corey Enright, Tom Hawkins, Tom Lonergan, Joel Selwood, Harry Taylor
Gold Coast	1	Gary Ablett Jr.
Greater Western Sydney	0	
Hawthorn	4	Grant Birchall, Lance Franklin, Sam Mitchell, Cyril Rioli
Melbourne	0	
North Melbourne	2	Drew Petrie, Andrew Swallow
Port Adelaide	0	
Richmond	4	Trent Cotchin, Brett Deledio, Ivan Maric, Jack Riewoldt
St Kilda	4	Sean Dempster, Lenny Hayes, Stephen Milne, Nick Riewoldt
Sydney	4	Kieren Jack, Lewis Jetta, Josh Kennedy, Ted Richards
West Coast	4	Dean Cox, Darren Glass, Nic Naitanui, Beau Waters
Western Bulldogs	0	

=== Final team ===
Darren Glass of West Coast was named as the All-Australian captain, with Gary Ablett Jr. of Gold Coast named as vice-captain.

2012 All-Australian team
B:	Sean Dempster (St Kilda)	Luke McPharlin (Fremantle)	Darren Glass (West Coast) (captain)
HB:	Beau Waters (West Coast)	Ted Richards (Sydney)	Grant Birchall (Hawthorn)
C:	Trent Cotchin (Richmond)	Jobe Watson (Essendon)	Dayne Beams (Collingwood)
HF:	Patrick Dangerfield (Adelaide)	Lance Franklin (Hawthorn)	Cyril Rioli (Hawthorn)
F:	Stephen Milne (St Kilda)	Tom Hawkins (Geelong)	Dean Cox (West Coast)
Foll:	Nic Naitanui (West Coast)	Scott Thompson (Adelaide)	Gary Ablett Jr. (Gold Coast) (vice-captain)
Int:	Brett Deledio (Richmond)	Josh Kennedy (Sydney)	Scott Pendlebury (Collingwood)
Int:	Dane Swan (Collingwood)		
Coach:	John Longmire (Sydney)		

Note: the position of coach in the All-Australian team is traditionally awarded to the coach of the premiership team.
