= Peter Russo =

Peter Russo may refer to:

- Peter Russo (footballer) (born 1959), former Australian rules footballer
- Peter Russo (politician) (born 1955), Australian politician
- Peter Russo (character), character in House of Cards (2013–2018)
