= Peter Russo (footballer) =

Australian rules footballer

Personal information
- Born: 29 October 1959 (age 67)
- Original team: Pakenham
- Height: 177 cm (5 ft 10 in)
- Weight: 70 kg (154 lb)

Playing career^{1}
Years	Club	Games (Goals)
1978–1988	Hawthorn	162 (102)
1989–1990	St Kilda	33 (20)
Total		195 (122)
- ^{1} Playing statistics correct to the end of 1990.

Career highlights
- 2× VFL premiership player: 1978, 1986

Peter Russo (born 29 October 1959) is a former Australian rules footballer who played for Hawthorn in the Victorian Football League (VFL) during the 1980s. After a 1988 season where he played only eight senior games, Russo, alongside Paul Harding and Robert Handley, was traded to St Kilda in exchange for the first choice in the 1988 VFL Draft. Russo spent three seasons with the Saints, although he did not play a single game in 1991 due to a knee reconstruction and retired in June of that year.

Mostly used as a ruck-rover and in the forward pocket, Russo could also play in the back pocket and wing. He started his career with Hawthorn in 1978 and was a member of their 1978 premiership side. Russo missed out on Hawthorn's 1983 premiership through injury but was a premiership player again in 1986. In 1985 he represented Victoria at interstate football.

== Coaching and teaching career ==
Post-retirement from football, he became a PE teacher at schools including Mentone Grammar School and Firbank Girls' Grammar School.

Peter coached the Dandenong Stingrays in their inaugural TAC Cup season in 1992. Following this, he also had stints at Melbourne, where he coached the reserves to a premiership in 1993, and St Kilda.

== Family ==
Russo's father, Felix Russo, was a VFL footballer for St Kilda.

He also has three nephews who have played league football: Josh Kennedy (son of John Kennedy Jr. and Bernadette Russo), and brothers Luke and Matthew Ball (sons of Ray Ball and Jenny Russo). He grew up alongside his five siblings in Pakenhamand attended St Bede’s College
