= Luke Ball =

Australian rules footballer (born 1984)

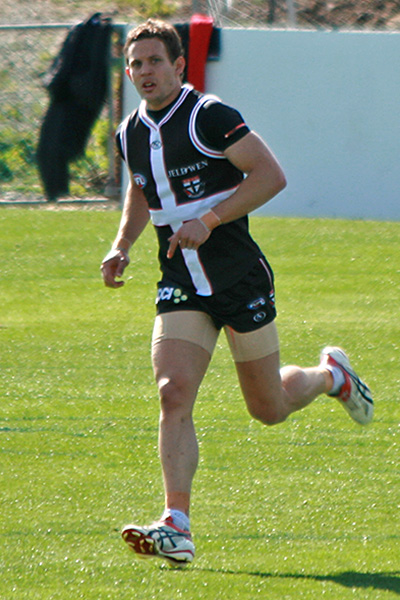
- Ball wearing St Kilda colours

Personal information
- Full name: Luke Patrick Ball
- Born: 25 May 1984 (age 42)
- Original team: Xavier College(APS)/Sandringham Dragons(TAC Cup)
- Draft: No. 2 (PP), 2001 National Draft, St Kilda; No. 30, 2009 National Draft, Collingwood
- Height: 183 cm (6 ft 0 in)
- Weight: 83 kg (183 lb)
- Position: Midfielder

Playing career
Years	Club	Games (Goals)
2003–2009	St Kilda	142 (58)
2010–2014	Collingwood	81 (33)
Total		223 (91)

International team honours
Years	Team	Games (Goals)
2004	Australia	2

Career highlights
- AFL premiership player: 2010; All-Australian Team: 2005; Trevor Barker Award: 2005; St Kilda captain: 2006–2007; AFL Rising Star nominee: 2003; Pre-Season Premiership: 2004, 2008; 2nd in Trevor Barker Award 2004; Gavin Brown Award: 2010, 2011

Luke Patrick Ball (born 25 May 1984) is a former professional Australian rules football player who played for the St Kilda and Collingwood football clubs in the Australian Football League. From 2003 to 2009 he played 142 games for the St Kilda Football Club where he was captain in 2007 and best and fairest and All-Australian in 2005. He is one of the only players in AFL history to have played in four consecutive grand finals for two clubs; for St Kilda in 2009 and for Collingwood in 2010, the 2010 replay and 2011.

== Early life ==
Ball is the younger brother of Hawthorn player Matthew Ball, both of whom played for the local football club at Ashburton in their junior years. Both brothers and little sister Sophie grew up with their parents in the Melbourne suburb of Glen Iris, attending St Roch's Primary School. His father, Ray Ball, was also a footballer, who played for Richmond and South Melbourne.

He was drafted to the St Kilda Football Club in 2001 with the priority pick (number 2 overall) in the AFL draft. The draft that year was known as the "super draft" and Ball was taken behind Luke Hodge and ahead of Chris Judd. He debuted in 2003 after having injury problems and choosing to play football for Xavier College in his final school year. Ball finished his schooling with a VCE ENTER score of 98.8.

== AFL career ==
After missing his initial debut season, Ball was a Rising Star nominee in his debut season of 2003. He played 16 games and averaged 15.8 disposals per game in a solid first season.

=== 2004 season ===
Ball played in St Kilda's 2004 Wizard Home Loans Cup winning side, the club's second pre-season cup win.

2004 was a big year for Ball, coming second in St Kilda's Trevor Barker Award for the club's best and fairest player. In 2004, Ball averaged 20 disposals and 5 tackles per game. He also pushed forward to boot 17 goals for the season.

=== 2005 season ===
In 2005 Ball won the Trevor Barker Award for St Kilda's best and fairest player, tying with Steven Baker.

Ball was also recognised for his excellent season with selection in the 2005 All-Australian Team as a midfield player, his first All-Australian Team award. He averaged 22 disposals and 5.3 tackles per game.

When Nick Riewoldt was injured in the opening round of the 2005 season (and consequently missed the next five weeks), Ball was appointed as acting captain.

=== 2006 season ===
In 2006 Ball was announced as the St Kilda captain, succeeding Nick Riewoldt under the Saints' then rotational captaincy policy. Early in the season groin problems kept the young captain from performing at his best, but he was cleared in mid-June of having Osteitis pubis from which many media outlets had claimed he was suffering. Ball's second half of the season saw improvement in his game. He was slightly down on his 2005 form, but still managed to average 21.9 touches and play 21 games in his first season as St Kilda captain.

=== 2007 season ===
In 2007 Ball was co-captain along with Lenny Hayes and Riewoldt. He played a total of 18 games of the home and away season - picking up 345 disposals, 5 goals and 91 tackles. Although well down on his 2005 form, he played a valuable role in the team and solidified his reputation as a "hard-nut" and core member of St Kilda's midfield.

=== 2008 season ===
Ball played in St Kilda's 2008 NAB Cup winning side - St Kilda's third pre-season cup win.

In 2008 Ball again missed only four games with injury - picking up 392 disposals, 7 goals and 107 tackles. A hamstring tear late in the season caused him to miss the finals series.

=== 2009 season ===
Ball played in 17 of 22 matches in the 2009 AFL season home and away rounds in which St Kilda qualified in first position for the finals, winning the club's third minor premiership.

St Kilda qualified for the 2009 AFL Grand Final after qualifying and preliminary finals wins. Ball played in the grand final when St Kilda was defeated by 12 points.

At the end of 2009 season Ball requested to be traded to Collingwood. A deal between the two clubs, however, was not settled before the trade week deadline despite mediation from the AFL. On 10 November 2009 he officially left St Kilda and nominated for the national draft. On 26 November 2009 he was drafted to Collingwood with their first pick (number 30 overall).

Ross Lyon described the departure of Ball in early 2010:

"Look, Luke Ball in simple terms is this: Luke had a rich history with St Kilda, but the AFL is a professional sport and expectations are often set and not met by club or player. Clearly, along the line, there has been some expectations not met on both sides of the fence. Luke is a Collingwood player now and that's his future and it's not for me to talk about our expectations. During the year he got dropped, then he matched our expectations (and returned) and then obviously there was some expectations from Luke that we weren't meeting and he moved on. That's where that sits. That (the failed trade to Collingwood) was the decision we made at the time and we stand by that. Did we want nothing for him? No. Let's be clear on this, Luke wasn't traded or delisted. Luke walked out on St Kilda, of which he had a million dollar-plus contract on the table. "

Of the departure, Ball stated that "I guess Collingwood's list and the fact they have been right up there for three or four years is attractive, plus a good blend of youth and experience. I have moved on from St Kilda with no bitterness or resentment. I had eight great years with the club. But after eight years I felt like I needed a fresh start and fresh opportunity. That's a pretty simple way to put it and maybe when the dust settles I'll be able to explain it a bit better. "

=== 2010 season ===
Ball made his Collingwood debut in the NAB Cup first round, coincidentally against St Kilda, his former club. The Saints won the game by one point after they had been leading by seven goals in the third quarter. His home and away debut came in Round 1 against the Western Bulldogs at Etihad Stadium. The Magpies won the game by 36 points with Ball having 18 disposals. In the Preliminary Final, Ball left the field during the third quarter with a hamstring cramp. Despite this he was selected in the squad for the grand final.

Collingwood played St Kilda in the 2010 AFL Grand Finals on 25 September, which ended in a draw. The premiership was decided in a rematch on 2 October 2010, that Collingwood won. In his post match interview, Ball was modest in celebrating, citing respect towards his ex-teammates in St Kilda and adding "It was more about trying to restart a career and it’s amazing how it has all turned out." Ball's first season in the black and white saw his love and passion for footy to return, he played 24 games and averaged 21.1 disposals as a part of Collingwoods engine room.

=== 2011 season ===
Ball had another stellar season in the midfield whilst joining Collingwood's leadership group, he averaged 21.5 disposals and laid 166 tackles (6.9 per game) in 24 matches. He also returned to form in front of goal after having much criticism for his goal kicking, he answered his critics by slotting 18.3 for the season.

During the 2011 season he became one of Collingwood's most important and most consistent players. Grabbing the spotlight in the finals series whilst scoring two clutch goals to seal victories in both the Qualifying final and Preliminary final. The goal in the 2011 prelim would be one of Luke's best highlights, as he snapped a goal on his opposite foot (left) with less than 2 minutes to go, giving Collingwood the win.

His 2011 season ended in disappointment, as Collingwood lost the 2011 Grand Final to the Geelong Cats by 38 points.

=== 2012 season ===
Ball started off the 2012 season by being elected the President of the AFL players association. He also was appointed acting captain in Collingwood's first NAB cup game.

During Collingwood's Round 3 match against Carlton, Ball suffered a knee injury in the first quarter. After having it strapped, Ball returned to the field but subsequently re-injured his knee just before halftime. Later scans revealed Ball had ruptured his anterior cruciate ligament (ACL), requiring a knee reconstruction & ending his season.

=== 2013 season ===
Hamstring issues delayed Ball's start to the season and then played in the VFL to get his form back. He recorded 26 possessions and eight clearances on his return against Bendigo during a Friday night VFL fixture at the Queen Elizabeth Oval and was summoned to AFL ranks two weeks later.

Ball returned from a knee reconstruction in round eight against Geelong. In his second game back in round nine Ball managed to notch 28 disposals and nine tackles. He went on to produce a consistent season punctured by three one-week layoffs with calf complaints.

His best game of the season was against Essendon in round 19 when he polled three Brownlow votes owing to his seven tackles, 22 possessions and four clearances. His return season from a knee reconstruction saw Ball play 13 games and averaged 23.4 disposals.

=== 2014 season ===
At the end of the season, following a back injury which would require surgery to play in 2015, Ball announced his retirement.

== Statistics ==
Legend
G	Goals	K	Kicks	D	Disposals	T	Tackles
B	Behinds	H	Handballs	M	Marks

Season	Team	No.	Games	Totals							Averages (per game)						
Season	Team	No.	Games	G	B	K	H	D	M	T	G	B	K	H	D	M	T
2003	St Kilda	14	16	10	6	134	118	252	53	48	0.6	0.4	8.4	7.4	15.8	3.3	3.0
2004	St Kilda	14	25	17	5	280	219	499	95	126	0.7	0.2	11.2	8.8	20.0	3.8	5.0
2005	St Kilda	14	24	12	10	335	193	528	94	126	0.5	0.4	14.0	8.0	22.0	3.9	5.3
2006	St Kilda	14	21	4	6	249	210	459	101	104	0.2	0.3	11.9	10.0	21.9	4.8	5.0
2007	St Kilda	14	18	5	9	190	155	345	80	91	0.3	0.5	10.6	8.6	19.2	4.4	5.1
2008	St Kilda	14	18	7	6	190	202	392	71	107	0.4	0.3	10.6	11.2	21.8	3.9	5.9
2009	St Kilda	14	20	3	7	185	207	392	61	116	0.2	0.4	9.3	10.4	19.6	3.1	5.8
2010	Collingwood	12	24	7	10	246	261	507	100	155	0.3	0.4	10.3	10.9	21.1	4.2	6.5
2011	Collingwood	12	24	18	3	282	235	517	107	166	0.8	0.1	11.8	9.8	21.5	4.5	6.9
2012	Collingwood	12	3	0	1	28	22	50	10	17	0.0	0.3	9.3	7.3	16.7	3.3	5.7
2013	Collingwood	12	13	2	4	148	156	304	41	84	0.2	0.3	11.4	12.0	23.4	3.2	6.5
2014	Collingwood	12	17	6	3	156	153	309	69	83	0.4	0.2	9.2	9.0	18.2	4.1	4.9
Career			223	91	70	2423	2131	4554	882	1223	0.4	0.3	10.9	9.6	20.4	4.0	5.5

== Career highlights ==
- 2011 Collingwood Pre-Season Cup Winning Team
- 2010 Collingwood premiership team (2 October)
- 2010 Collingwood grand final team (25 September)
- 2010 Collingwood minor premiership team
- 2009 St Kilda grand final team
- 2009 St Kilda minor premiership team
- 2008 St Kilda pre-season cup winning team
- 2007 St Kilda captain
- 2006 St Kilda co-captain
- 2005 St Kilda best and fairest award (equal)
- 2005 All-Australian team
- 2004 St Kilda pre-season cup winning team
- 2004 International Rules team
- 10 AFL finals series matches

== Personal life ==
On his mother Jenny's side of the family, Ball is the grandson of former St Kilda footballer Felix Russo and nephew of former Hawthorn and St Kilda footballer Peter Russo. In addition, Ball is the first cousin of Sydney Swans footballer Josh Kennedy.
