= Jobe Watson =

Australian rules footballer (born 1985)

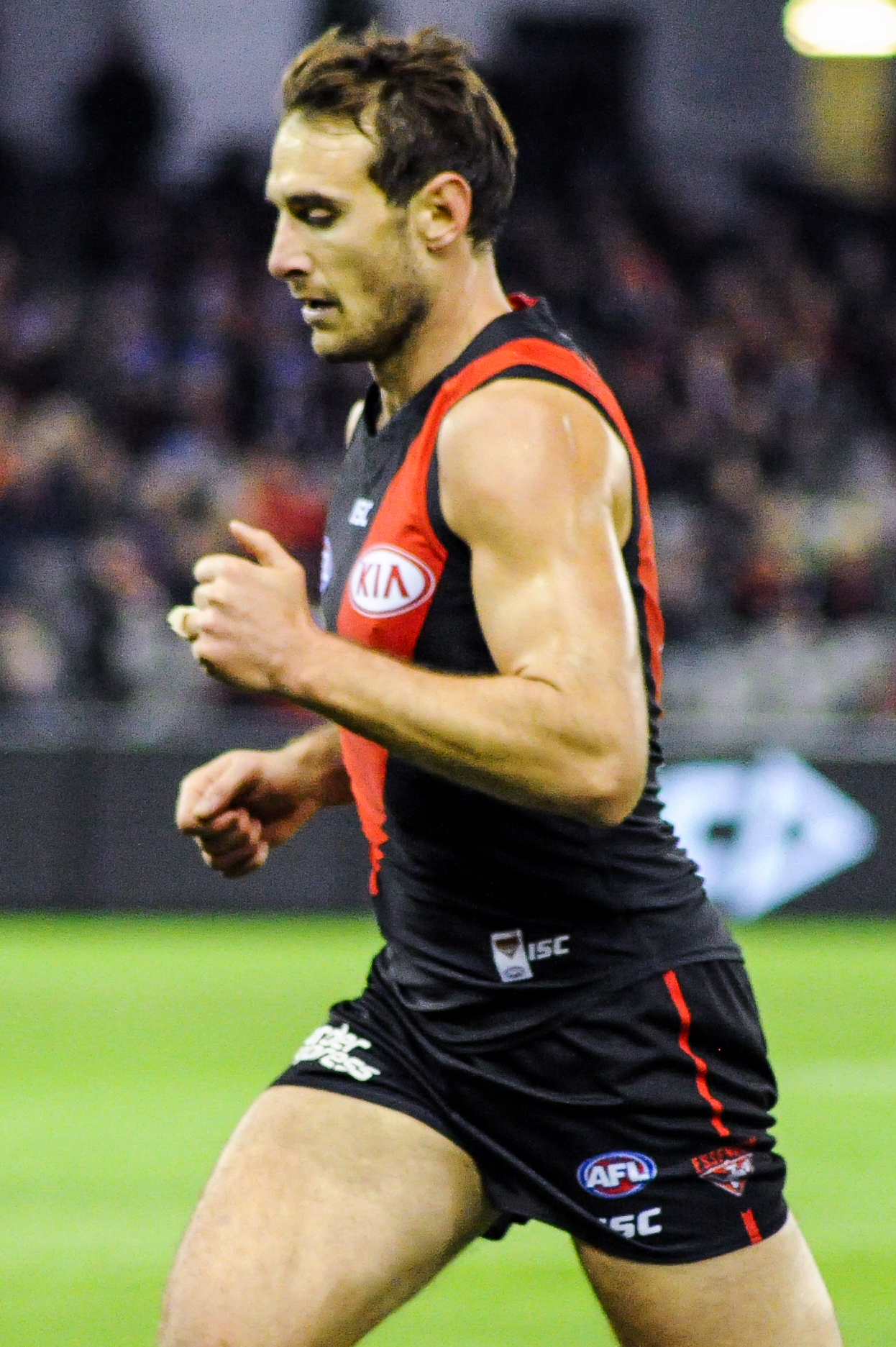
- Watson playing for Essendon in 2017

Personal information
- Full name: Jobe Watson
- Born: 8 February 1985 (age 41); Melbourne, Victoria
- Original team: Sandringham Dragons (TAC Cup)
- Draft: No. 40 (F/S), 2002 national draft
- Debut: Round 13, 2003, Essendon vs. Geelong, at Telstra Dome
- Height: 191 cm (6 ft 3 in)
- Weight: 93 kg (205 lb)
- Position: Midfielder

Playing career
Years	Club	Games (Goals)
2003–2017	Essendon	220 (113)

International team honours
Years	Team	Games (Goals)
2014	Australia	1 (0)

Career highlights
- Essendon captain: 2010–2016; 2× All-Australian team: 2012, 2013; 3× Crichton Medal: 2009, 2010, 2012; AFLPA best captain award: 2012; Yiooken Award: 2013

Jobe Watson (born 8 February 1985) is a former professional Australian rules footballer who played for the Essendon Football Club in the Australian Football League (AFL). Watson, the son of three-time Essendon premiership champion Tim Watson, was drafted by Essendon under the father–son rule in the 2002 national draft, and went on to become one of the best midfielders of the modern era. A dual All-Australian and three-time Crichton Medallist, he captained Essendon from 2010 to early 2016, and was the face of the Essendon playing group during the most turbulent period in the club's history.

Watson was one of thirty-four players suspended as part of the Essendon Football Club supplements saga for using the banned performance-enhancing substance Thymosin beta-4 during the 2012 AFL season. He originally won that season's Brownlow Medal as the league's best and fairest player, but was later ruled ineligible in 2016 as a result of the suspension and subsequently handed back the medal. Watson was suspended for the entire 2016 AFL season, before returning the following year; he then played for one more season before retiring.

Watson is currently an AFL commentator for the Seven Network, following in the footsteps of his father Tim.

== Early life ==
Watson was educated at Xavier College in Kew. From years five to eight he attended Xavier's Kostka Hall junior campus in Brighton. He played junior football with the East Sandringham Junior Football Club and the Sandringham Dragons in the TAC Cup. His father Tim played 307 games for Essendon from 1977 to 1994, playing in three premierships with the club, and captained Essendon from 1989 to 1991, before coaching St Kilda from 1999 to 2000; he is currently a commentator for the Seven Network.

== AFL career ==
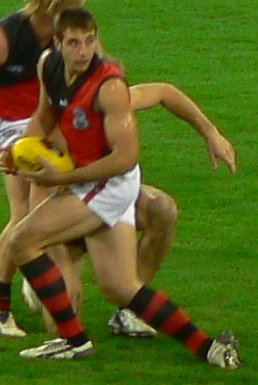
Watson playing in 2007

Watson was selected at pick 40 under the father–son rule in the 2002 national draft. He was initially coached as a key forward by Kevin Sheedy, who also coached his father Tim. His poor kicking by AFL standards drew criticism, and it was determined that he would be more suited to the midfield at Essendon. At the time, his weight was criticised by the media, as he was overweight for an AFL player. Over the next two seasons, he began to develop his craft in the Essendon midfield and became one of the competition's elite midfielders.

Watson had a consistent season in 2009, polling ten Brownlow Medal votes and winning the Essendon best-and-fairest award, the Crichton Medal. Watson polled 335 votes in 15 of the 21 games he played in the 2009 season, with only one game missed due to an ankle injury. Watson was 46 votes ahead of runner-up Dustin Fletcher, who polled 289 votes. By the end of the 2009 season, Watson had gathered a reputation as Essendon's most important midfielder (coming first in the club's overall clearances) and improved his once-criticised kicking ability to above the standard of an AFL player. Watson was announced as Essendon captain on 21 December 2009, taking over from retired goalkicker Matthew Lloyd.

Despite Essendon suffering a disappointing 2010 season, winning only seven games and finishing 14th on the AFL ladder, Watson enjoyed a successful first year as captain. He was a consistent performer in an inconsistent season for the Bombers, polling 16 Brownlow votes from a total of 43 received by Essendon players, including a three-vote game in his 100th AFL game, finishing equal-seventh in the 2010 Brownlow Medal count, and having the highest number of votes for a player from a team finishing outside the final eight. Watson was once again awarded the Crichton Medal, earning 291 points, which was 50 points clear of runner-up Heath Hocking.

Watson had a relatively good season in 2011 despite missing six weeks with a hamstring injury, earning 15 Brownlow votes and finishing runner-up in the Crichton Medal, losing out to up-and-coming third-year midfielder David Zaharakis. Watson completed an outstanding 2012 season by winning the Brownlow Medal with 30 votes (though he was later ruled ineligible after being suspended during the Essendon Football Club supplements saga). Along with his third Crichton Medal, he also won a handful of other accolades, including the AFLPA best captain award, the Lou Richards Medal and selection in the 2012 All-Australian team as the centreman. Watson missed three weeks with a broken collarbone in 2013, but had another consistent season, earning 17 Brownlow votes, finishing runner-up in the Crichton Medal to former St Kilda utility (and later successor as captain) Brendon Goddard, and being named on the interchange in the 2013 All-Australian team. Between 2006 and 2013, Watson finished all but one season in the top two for votes for the Crichton Medal.

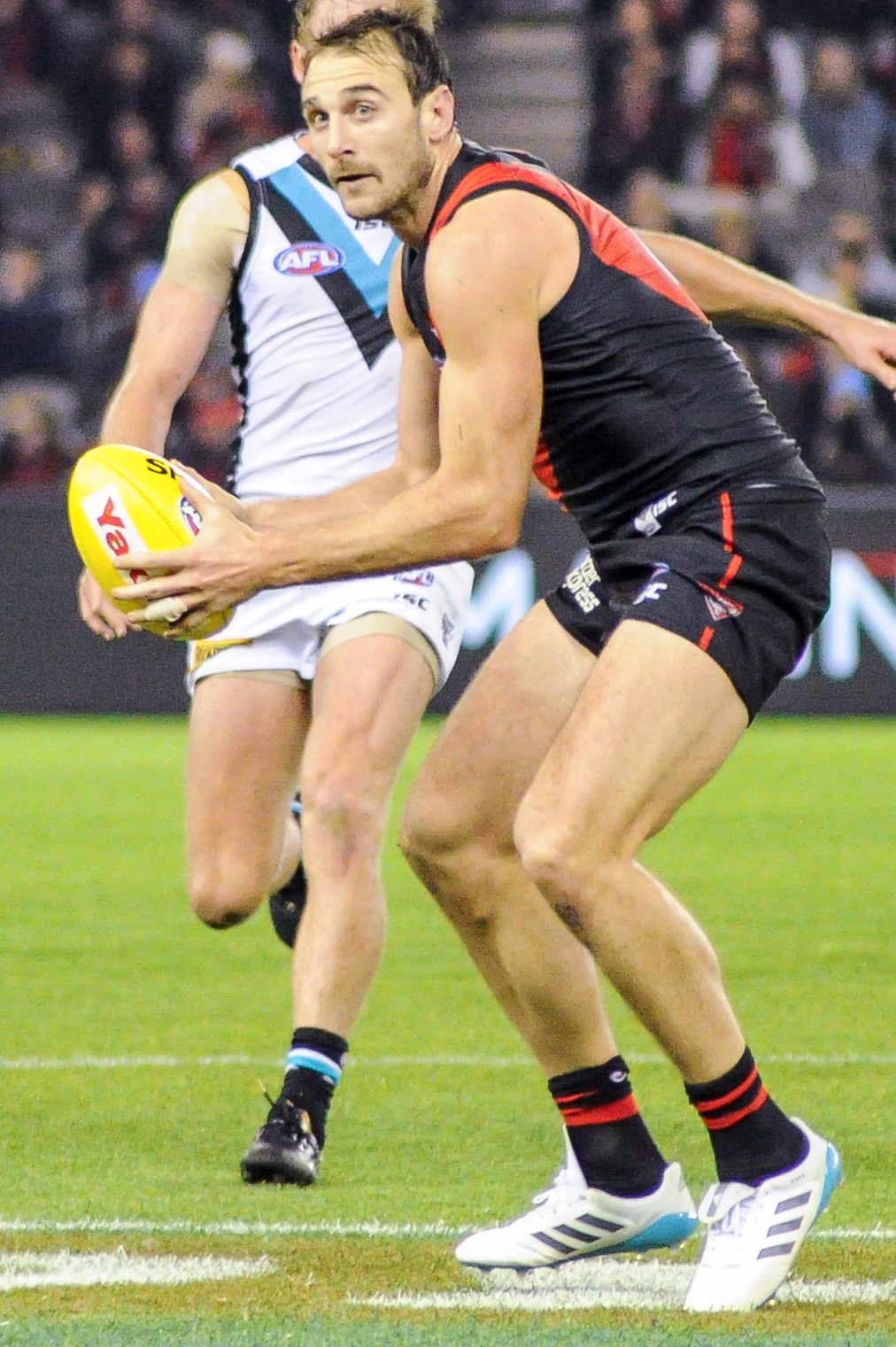
Watson playing in 2017

Watson had a good start to the 2014 season, but he injured his hip flexor in round 12 and consequently missed ten weeks. Watson later returned to play in the final three games of the home-and-away season and Essendon's elimination final loss to North Melbourne. Watson then went on to poll eight Brownlow votes, behind up-and-coming midfielder and future captain Dyson Heppell. Watson was also selected in the Australian team for the first time in his career to play in the 2014 International Rules Series. Watson was among the best players in the one-test series, which Australia won by ten points.

In 2015, despite controversy surrounding the team's lack of fitness (following a compromised pre-season) and a tough first half of the season for Essendon, Watson continued to lead his team well early in the season despite his own injury clouds. In Round 14, Watson played his 200th AFL game in what proved to be a torrid day for the Bombers, as they lost to St Kilda by 110 points. Following that match, Watson was ruled out for the rest of the season with a shoulder injury, having injured it the previous week; Watson polled seven Brownlow votes in the first five rounds prior to the injury. He was later banned for the 2016 season as part of the club's supplements saga.

Watson played his first competitive match in over eighteen months – and his first without being captain of the club since 2009 – when he and several of the other Essendon players who served bans in 2016 made their return to the field against Collingwood in the 2017 pre-season. Watson then made a successful return to football with a dominant game against Hawthorn in a 25-point win. On 9 August 2017, with three rounds left in the home-and-away season, Watson announced that he would retire at the end of the season. Watson then played in three of Essendon's last four matches, with his final game coming in the 65-point elimination final loss to Sydney at the Sydney Cricket Ground. Watson played 20 games in his final season, which is the most he had played in a season since 2012, to finish on 220 games for Essendon.

== Supplements controversy ==
On 24 June 2013, while the Essendon Football Club was being investigated by the Australian Sports Anti-Doping Authority (ASADA) over the legality of its supplements program during the 2012 AFL season, Watson admitted on the Fox Footy program On the Couch that he believed he was given the substance AOD-9604 during the 2012 season with the assistance of the club. The World Anti-Doping Agency (WADA) released a statement clarifying that AOD-9604 fell into the "S0. Non-Approved Substances" category in their List of Prohibited Substances and Methods. ASADA also stated that the use of AOD-9604 is prohibited for use by athletes in any circumstances.

During the investigation, Watson was among the thirty-four present and former Essendon players issued show cause notices by ASADA and infraction notices by the AFL, alleging the use of the banned peptide Thymosin beta-4 during the 2012 season. On 31 March 2015, the AFL Anti-Doping Tribunal found all thirty-four players not guilty of all charges. In January 2016, following an appeal by WADA against the AFL Tribunal's not-guilty finding, Watson, along with the other thirty-three players, had their not-guilty verdict overturned. All thirty-four players were suspended for two years, backdated to November 2016, causing him to miss the entire 2016 AFL season.

As Watson had won the 2012 Brownlow Medal, during the season that the supplements program took place, the AFL Commission reviewed the award. Watson was retrospectively ruled ineligible for the award by the commission, and the medal then awarded to the next-highest vote-getters, Richmond's Trent Cotchin and then-Hawthorn player Sam Mitchell (who had just been traded to the West Coast Eagles at the time), under the normal rules regarding ineligible players in Brownlow Medal counts. Watson had pre-empted the decision by announcing on 11 November 2016 that he would hand back the medal.

== Statistics ==
Legend
G	Goals	K	Kicks	D	Disposals	T	Tackles
B	Behinds	H	Handballs	M	Marks

Season	Team	No.	Games	Totals							Averages (per game)							Votes
Season	Team	No.	Games	G	B	K	H	D	M	T	G	B	K	H	D	M	T	Votes
2003	Essendon	4	1	0	0	0	2	2	0	2	0.0	0.0	0.0	2.0	2.0	0.0	2.0	0
2004	Essendon	4	7	6	2	37	42	79	23	16	0.9	0.3	5.3	6.0	11.3	3.3	2.3	0
2005	Essendon	4	5	2	0	23	32	55	14	5	0.4	0.0	4.6	6.4	11.0	2.8	1.0	0
2006	Essendon	4	21	6	7	203	276	479	114	69	0.3	0.3	9.7	13.1	22.8	5.4	3.3	0
2007	Essendon	4	19	6	5	193	249	442	85	62	0.3	0.3	10.2	13.1	23.3	4.5	3.3	5
2008	Essendon	4	19	4	8	193	265	458	54	68	0.2	0.4	10.2	14.1	24.1	3.8	3.6	5
2009	Essendon	4	22	10	10	221	322	543	73	98	0.4	0.4	10.0	14.6	24.7	3.3	4.4	10
2010	Essendon	4	21	10	1	209	363	572	77	91	0.5	0.0	10.0	17.3	27.2	3.7	4.3	16
2011	Essendon	4	17	15	11	237	208	445	77	65	0.9	0.6	13.9	12.2	26.2	4.1	3.8	15
2012	Essendon	4	22	20	8	343	295	638	106	105	0.9	0.4	15.6	13.4	29.0	4.8	4.8	30 (Note: Watson polled the most votes in the 2012 Brownlow Medal count, but was later ruled ineligible as part of the Essendon Football Club supplements saga.)
2013	Essendon	4	19	16	18	259	264	523	74	60	0.8	1.0	13.6	13.9	27.5	3.9	3.2	17
2014	Essendon	4	15	10	2	185	226	411	70	70	0.7	0.1	12.3	15.1	27.4	4.7	4.7	8
2015	Essendon	4	12	6	6	124	163	287	45	53	0.5	0.5	10.3	13.6	23.9	3.8	4.4	7
2016	Essendon	4	0	—	—	—	—	—	—	—	—	—	—	—	—	—	—	0
2017	Essendon	4	20	2	6	194	278	472	97	84	0.1	0.3	9.7	13.9	23.6	4.9	4.2	0
Career			220	113	85	2421	2985	5406	901	848	0.5	0.4	11.0	13.6	24.6	4.1	3.9	113

== Honours and achievements ==
- Essendon captain: 2010–2016
- 2× All-Australian team: 2012, 2013
- 3× Crichton Medal: 2009, 2010, 2012
- AFLPA best captain award: 2012
- Australia representative honours in international rules football: 2014
- Yiooken Award: 2013

== Coaching ==
Watson returned to his former school, Xavier College, as senior coach of their football team for the 2023 season.

== Off-field ==
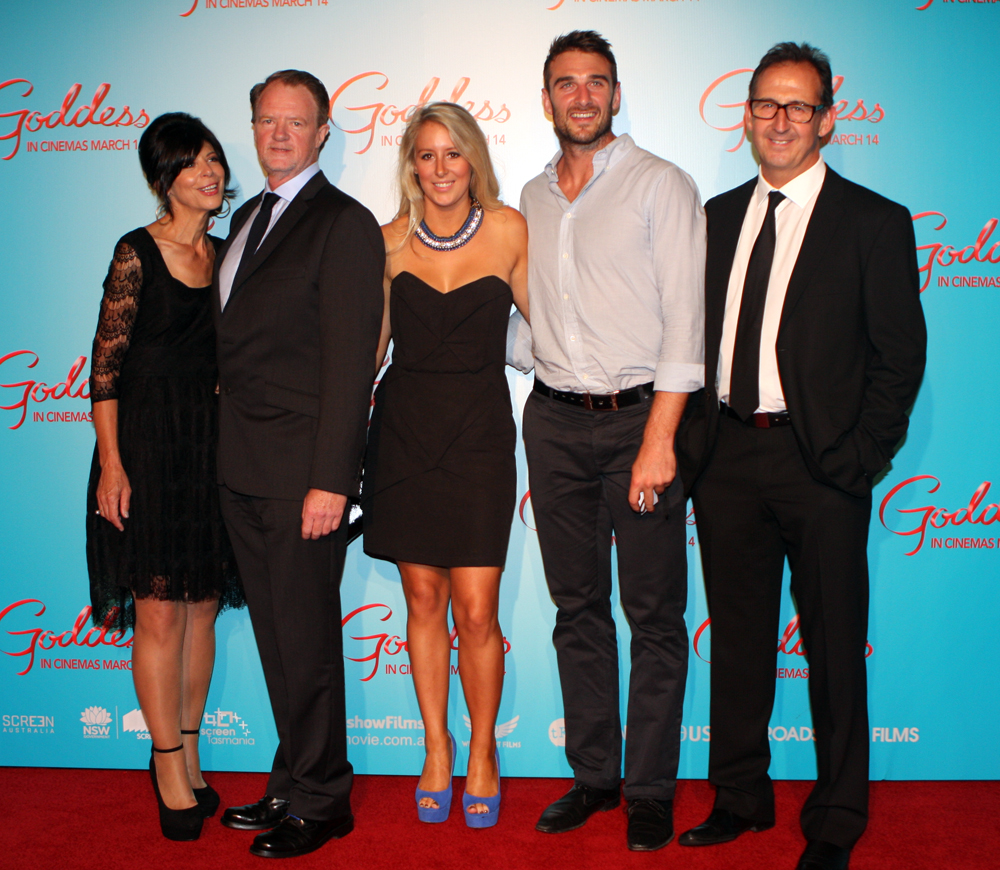
Watson (second from right) with friends at the premiere of Goddess in Sydney in March 2013

Whilst being unable to play in 2014 due to a hip flexor injury, Watson did commentary work for the Seven Network as a boundary rider for one match; he later returned in 2019 for a home-and-away match and final. He also filled in for co-host Craig Hutchison on the episode of Footy Classified immediately following the final home-and-away round of the 2017 season, and was a guest panellist on Talking Footy in 2019. He joined Seven's commentary team on a more permanent basis in 2020.

While serving his suspension in 2016, Watson worked at Hole in the Wall, a coffee shop in New York City. During his retirement speech, Watson said that he had several United States–based business interests, including two café-style venues, a gym and a buyers' advocacy business, that he wanted to focus on upon retiring.

In June 2019, Watson participated in the Big Freeze at the 'G alongside several former AFL footballers and Australian sportspeople to raise money for the Cure for MND Foundation.

== Personal life ==
Watson met Dutch model Virginia Slaghekke, who was represented by Donald Trump's Trump Model Management, at Hole in the Wall in New York City while he was working there during his suspension in 2016, and they began dating in August 2016. Slaghekke, a neuroscience/pre-medical student at the time, later moved to Melbourne on a student exchange program to support Watson during his final AFL season. They have two children together.
