= 2012 AFL season =

116th season of the Australian Football League (AFL)

2012 AFL premiership season
- Teams: 18
- Premiers: Sydney; 5th premiership
- Minor premiers: Hawthorn; 8th minor premiership
- Pre-season cup: Adelaide; 2nd pre-season cup win
- Brownlow Medallist: Sam Mitchell; Hawthorn; Trent Cotchin; Richmond (both 26 votes)
- Coleman Medallist: Jack Riewoldt; Richmond (65 goals)

Attendance
- Matches played: 207
- Total attendance: 6,778,559 (32,747 per match)
- Highest (H&A): 86,932 (round 5, Collingwood v Essendon)
- Highest (finals): 99,683 (Grand Final, Hawthorn vs. Sydney)

The 2012 AFL season was the 116th season of the Australian Football League (AFL), the highest-level senior Australian rules football competition in Australia.

The season featured eighteen clubs, with addition of the newly established Greater Western Sydney Giants, which was based in Western Sydney and split its home games between Sydney and Canberra.

The season ran from 24 March until 29 September, and comprised a 22-game home-and-away season followed by a finals series featuring the top eight clubs.

The premiership was won by the Sydney Swans for the fifth time, after it defeated Hawthorn by ten points in the 2012 AFL Grand Final.

== Pre-season ==
=== Draft ===
The 2011 National Draft was held on 24 November in Sydney, making it only the second time it was held out of Melbourne. This is due to the entry of Greater Western Sydney.

=== NAB Cup ===
Adelaide won the 2012 pre-season competition following a 34-point win over the West Coast Eagles at AAMI Stadium. It was their second pre-season cup premiership.

2012 NAB Cup Grand Final
Saturday, 17 March (7:10 pm)	Adelaide	def.	West Coast	AAMI Stadium (crowd: 27,376)	Report
0.2.2 (14); 1.3.6 (33); 2.6.13 (67); 2.10.17 (95)	Q1; Q2; Q3; Final	2.0.2 (20); 2.1.6 (30); 2.4.7 (49); 2.5.13 (61)	Umpires: McBurney, McInerney, Mollison, Dalgleish; Michael Tuck Medal: Bernie Vince; Television broadcast: Fox Footy

== Premiership season ==
The fixture for this season was officially announced on 28 October 2011. Some of the features of the fixture included:

- Each team played 22 matches over 23 rounds.
- Each team had one bye between rounds 11 and 13. This is similar in practice to the split round concept prior to 2011, which saw one of the mid-season rounds played over two weeks, thus giving each team one week off.
- Due to concern over one-sided matches featuring the expansion teams (Gold Coast and Greater Western Sydney), their fixtures were adjusted so that they played each of the top five teams from 2011 only once.
- For the first time, each Victorian team travelled interstate at least five times, and each team travelled to Perth at least once.
- Blundstone Arena, Blacktown ISP Oval and Škoda Stadium hosted home and away matches for the first time in 2012.
- As had been the case since 2010, the final round of matches was given a floating fixture. Exact dates were determined later in the season, with a view to giving likely finalists the longest possible break ahead of their first final.

The addition of a ninth match in each round, and the new television rights deal requiring most matches to be shown live, also influenced the scheduling of matches.

Some traditional match starting times were changed, and in typical rounds, where nine matches were played between Friday and Sunday, the changes were:

- Friday night matches began at 7:50 pm EST instead of 7:40 pm (8:40 pm EST when played in South Australia or Western Australia).
- Saturday afternoon matches began at 1:40 pm EST and 1:45 pm or 2:10 pm EST.
- A regular Saturday match was scheduled beginning at 4:40 pm EST, being a twilight match on the east coast or an afternoon match in Perth.
- Saturday night matches began at 7:40 pm EST instead of 7:10 pm.
- The second Sunday afternoon match was moved to 3:15 pm from the traditional 2:10 pm. This change was to allow the Seven Network to show the match live into Victoria and use it as a lead-in to its 6:00 pm news bulletin.

=== Rule changes ===
Following two high profile goal umpiring errors in the previous three years' grand finals, in which goals were awarded to Tom Hawkins (Geelong, 2009) and Sharrod Wellingham (Collingwood, 2011) for shots which hit the post, video score reviews were introduced to AFL games for the first time. A score review could be initiated by the field umpire, at his own discretion or on request by the goal umpire, and television broadcast footage would be reviewed for visual evidence to overturn an on-field goal umpiring decision.

=== Round 1 ===
	Round 1
Saturday, 24 March (7:20 pm)	Greater Western Sydney 5.7 (37)	def. by	Sydney 14.16 (100)	ANZ Stadium (crowd: 38,203)	Report
Thursday, 29 March (7:45 pm)	Richmond 12.9 (81)	def. by	Carlton 18.17 (125)	MCG (crowd: 78,285)	Report
Friday, 30 March (7:50 pm)	Hawthorn 20.17 (137)	def.	Collingwood 16.19 (115)	MCG (crowd: 78,464)	Report
Saturday, 31 March (1:45 pm)	Melbourne 11.12 (78)	def. by	Brisbane Lions 17.17 (119)	MCG (crowd: 33,473)	Report
Saturday, 31 March (3:45 pm)	Gold Coast 10.8 (68)	def. by	Adelaide 19.23 (137)	Metricon Stadium (crowd: 12,790)	Report
Saturday, 31 March (4:45 pm)	Fremantle 16.9 (105)	def.	Geelong 15.11 (101)	Patersons Stadium (crowd: 34,601)	Report
Saturday, 31 March (7:45 pm)	North Melbourne 15.12 (102)	def. by	Essendon 14.20 (104)	Etihad Stadium (crowd: 45,699)	Report
Sunday, 1 April (1:10 pm)	Western Bulldogs 12.15 (87)	def. by	West Coast 21.10 (136)	Etihad Stadium (crowd: 24,977)	Report
Sunday, 1 April (4:10 pm)	Port Adelaide 13.11 (89)	def.	St Kilda 13.7 (85)	AAMI Stadium (crowd: 21,179)	Report
This round marked the debut of Greater Western Sydney in the AFL. For the first time since 2006, the AFL season opened outside of Victoria, and for the first time ever, in Sydney. The first match between Greater Western Sydney and Sydney was the only match in the first weekend, with the conventional Thursday night season-opening match between Carlton and Richmond opening the remainder of the round the following weekend.; Sydney won its first round 1 match since 2005.

=== Round 2 ===
	Round 2
Thursday, 5 April (7:40 pm)	Brisbane Lions 9.9 (63)	def. by	Carlton 23.16 (154)	The Gabba (crowd: 25,920)	Report
Saturday, 7 April (1:45 pm)	Essendon 16.15 (111)	def.	Port Adelaide 13.8 (86)	Etihad Stadium (crowd: 34,118)	Report
Saturday, 7 April (2:10 pm)	Sydney 14.10 (94)	def.	Fremantle 12.9 (81)	SCG (crowd: 22,242)	Report
Saturday, 7 April (2:40 pm)	West Coast 25.16 (166)	def.	Melbourne 9.4 (58)	Patersons Stadium (crowd: 35,674)	Report
Saturday, 7 April (7:10 pm)	Adelaide 11.16 (82)	def.	Western Bulldogs 9.10 (64)	AAMI Stadium (crowd: 34,021)	Report
Saturday, 7 April (7:40 pm)	Collingwood 12.13 (85)	def.	Richmond 8.16 (64)	MCG (crowd: 57,268)	Report
Sunday, 8 April (1:10 pm)	North Melbourne 28.15 (183)	def.	Greater Western Sydney 8.6 (54)	Blundstone Arena (crowd: 11,127)	Report
Sunday, 8 April (4:40 pm)	St Kilda 21.13 (139)	def.	Gold Coast 7.5 (47)	Etihad Stadium (crowd: 21,032)	Report
Monday, 9 April (3:10 pm)	Geelong 14.8 (92)	def.	Hawthorn 13.12 (90)	MCG (crowd: 69,231)	Report
West Coast recorded its largest ever winning margin against Melbourne, winning by 108 points.; The match between North Melbourne and Greater Western Sydney was the first AFL game to be played at Blundstone Arena in Hobart, Tasmania.; North Melbourne recorded its largest winning margin in any match (129 points) since round 2, 1996.

=== Round 3 ===
	Round 3
Friday, 13 April (7:50 pm)	Carlton 18.14 (122)	def.	Collingwood 9.8 (62)	MCG (crowd: 84,259)	Report
Saturday, 14 April (1:45 pm)	Richmond 20.13 (133)	def.	Melbourne 11.8 (74)	MCG (crowd: 49,826)	Report
Saturday, 14 April (1:40 pm)	Port Adelaide 12.11 (83)	def. by	Sydney 16.9 (105)	AAMI Stadium (crowd: 19,032)	Report
Saturday, 14 April (2:40 pm)	Fremantle 8.16 (64)	def.	Brisbane Lions 5.5 (35)	Patersons Stadium (crowd: 33,473)	Report
Saturday, 14 April (7:40 pm)	Western Bulldogs 5.10 (40)	def. by	St Kilda 15.13 (103)	Etihad Stadium (crowd: 28,971)	Report
Saturday, 14 April (7:40 pm)	Gold Coast 13.10 (88)	def. by	Essendon 15.15 (105)	Metricon Stadium (crowd: 17,069)	Report
Sunday, 15 April (1:10 pm)	Greater Western Sydney 10.9 (69)	def. by	West Coast 23.12 (150)	Blacktown ISP Oval (crowd: 6,875)	Report
Sunday, 15 April (3:15 pm)	Hawthorn 21.14 (140)	def.	Adelaide 12.12 (84)	MCG (crowd: 33,524)	Report
Sunday, 15 April (4:40 pm)	North Melbourne 20.11 (131)	def.	Geelong 16.18 (114)	Etihad Stadium (crowd: 29,630)	Report
The match between Greater Western Sydney and West Coast was the first and, as of 2023, only AFL match played at Blacktown International Sportspark.

=== Round 4 ===
	Round 4
Friday, 20 April (7:50 pm)	St Kilda 11.13 (79)	def. by	Fremantle 14.8 (92)	Etihad Stadium (crowd: 30,172)	Report
Saturday, 21 April (1:45 pm)	Carlton 11.13 (79)	def. by	Essendon 15.19 (109)	MCG (crowd: 73,172)	Report
Saturday, 21 April (2:10 pm)	Collingwood 14.13 (97)	def.	Port Adelaide 10.13 (73)	Etihad Stadium (crowd: 30,741)	Report
Saturday, 21 April (4:10 pm)	Adelaide 13.18 (96)	def.	Greater Western Sydney 7.8 (50)	AAMI Stadium (crowd: 28,261)	Report
Saturday, 21 April (7:40 pm)	Brisbane Lions 17.9 (111)	def.	Gold Coast 6.10 (46)	The Gabba (crowd: 21,980)	Report
Saturday, 21 April (5:40 pm)	West Coast 5.21 (51)	def.	Hawthorn 5.16 (46)	Patersons Stadium (crowd: 40,080)	Report
Sunday, 22 April (1:10 pm)	Geelong 11.9 (75)	def.	Richmond 9.11 (65)	Simonds Stadium (crowd: 21,952)	Report
Sunday, 22 April (3:15 pm)	Sydney 17.11 (113)	def.	North Melbourne 10.17 (77)	SCG (crowd: 21,049)	Report
Sunday, 22 April (4:40 pm)	Melbourne 9.13 (67)	def. by	Western Bulldogs 13.10 (88)	MCG (crowd: 33,565)	Report
The match between Carlton and Essendon was the 2,500th senior VFL/AFL match hosted by the Melbourne Cricket Ground.

=== Round 5 ===
	Round 5
Wednesday, 25 April (2:40 pm)	Collingwood 11.14 (80)	def.	Essendon 11.13 (79)	MCG (crowd: 86,932)	Report
Friday, 27 April (6:45 pm)	Fremantle 7.15 (57)	def. by	Carlton 10.5 (65)	Patersons Stadium (crowd: 38,847)	Report
Saturday, 28 April (1:45 pm)	Greater Western Sydney 9.8 (62)	def. by	Western Bulldogs 15.14 (104)	Manuka Oval (crowd: 9,128)	Report
Saturday, 28 April (4:40 pm)	North Melbourne 17.25 (127)	def.	Gold Coast 13.15 (93)	Etihad Stadium (crowd: 17,680)	Report
Saturday, 28 April (7:40 pm)	Melbourne 10.6 (66)	def. by	St Kilda 12.12 (84)	MCG (crowd: 24,798)	Report
Saturday, 28 April (7:45 pm)	Brisbane Lions 4.17 (41)	def. by	Geelong 12.7 (79)	The Gabba (crowd: 15,528)	Report
Sunday, 29 April (1:10 pm)	Hawthorn 10.9 (69)	def. by	Sydney 16.10 (106)	Aurora Stadium (crowd: 19,217)	Report
Sunday, 29 April (3:15 pm)	Richmond 14.13 (97)	def. by	West Coast 16.11 (107)	Etihad Stadium (crowd: 28,448)	Report
Sunday, 29 April (4:10 pm)	Adelaide 16.14 (110)	def.	Port Adelaide 14.7 (91)	AAMI Stadium (crowd: 41,649)	Report
Adam Goodes played his 304th club game for Sydney, to become the club games record holder for South Melbourne/Sydney.

=== Round 6 ===
	Round 6
Friday, 4 May (7:50 pm)	Western Bulldogs 11.11 (77)	def. by	Collingwood 15.8 (98)	Etihad Stadium (crowd: 38,155)	Report
Saturday, 5 May (1:40 pm)	Essendon 19.15 (129)	def.	Brisbane Lions 9.8 (62)	Etihad Stadium (crowd: 36,361)	Report
Saturday, 5 May (1:45 pm)	Geelong 17.17 (119)	def.	Melbourne 11.10 (76)	Simonds Stadium (crowd: 18,010)	Report
Saturday, 5 May (4:40 pm)	Gold Coast 14.3 (87)	def. by	Fremantle 14.10 (94)	Metricon Stadium (crowd: 11,670)	Report
Saturday, 5 May (7:40 pm)	Sydney 14.10 (94)	def. by	Adelaide 15.9 (99)	SCG (crowd: 23,969)	Report
Saturday, 5 May (7:40 pm)	St Kilda 13.10 (88)	def. by	Hawthorn 18.15 (123)	MCG (crowd: 42,289)	Report
Sunday, 6 May (1:10 pm)	Carlton 15.20 (110)	def.	Greater Western Sydney 6.7 (43)	Etihad Stadium (crowd: 28,201)	Report
Sunday, 6 May (2:45 pm)	Port Adelaide 8.6 (54)	def. by	Richmond 13.13 (91)	AAMI Stadium (crowd: 18,552)	Report
Sunday, 6 May (2:40 pm)	West Coast 17.18 (120)	def.	North Melbourne 15.5 (95)	Patersons Stadium (crowd: 37,202)	Report

=== Round 7 ===
	Round 7
Friday, 11 May (7:50 pm)	Melbourne 6.13 (49)	def. by	Hawthorn 15.25 (115)	MCG (crowd: 36,430)	Report
Saturday, 12 May (12:45 pm)	Adelaide 19.8 (122)	def.	Geelong 10.12 (72)	AAMI Stadium (crowd: 35,535)	Report
Saturday, 12 May (1:40 pm)	Greater Western Sydney 13.16 (94)	def.	Gold Coast 9.13 (67)	Manuka Oval (crowd: 8,603)	Report
Saturday, 12 May (4:40 pm)	Richmond 13.13 (91)	def.	Sydney 8.14 (62)	MCG (crowd: 40,352)	Report
Saturday, 12 May (7:40 pm)	Brisbane Lions 8.10 (58)	def. by	Collingwood 17.14 (116)	The Gabba (crowd: 27,926)	Report
Saturday, 12 May (7:40 pm)	Essendon 16.17 (113)	def.	West Coast 7.10 (52)	Etihad Stadium (crowd: 43,260)	Report
Sunday, 13 May (1:10 pm)	North Melbourne 12.11 (83)	def. by	Western Bulldogs 15.11 (101)	Etihad Stadium (crowd: 20,885)	Report
Sunday, 13 May (2:40 pm)	Fremantle 12.15 (87)	def.	Port Adelaide 7.5 (47)	Patersons Stadium (crowd: 30,079)	Report
Monday, 14 May (7:40 pm)	St Kilda 19.8 (122)	def.	Carlton 14.14 (98)	Etihad Stadium (crowd: 38,823)	Report
Greater Western Sydney recorded its first ever win in an AFL match.

=== Round 8 ===
	Round 8
Friday, 18 May (7:50 pm)	Collingwood 14.12 (96)	def.	Geelong 11.18 (84)	MCG (crowd: 75,650)	Report
Saturday, 19 May (1:15 pm)	Port Adelaide 14.11 (95)	def.	North Melbourne 14.9 (93)	AAMI Stadium (crowd: 14,508)	Report
Saturday, 19 May (2:10 pm)	Hawthorn 17.17 (119)	def.	Fremantle 9.9 (63)	Aurora Stadium (crowd: 12,959)	Report
Saturday, 19 May (4:40 pm)	Sydney 21.12 (138)	def.	Melbourne 5.7 (37)	SCG (crowd: 20,818)	Report
Saturday, 19 May (7:10 pm)	Western Bulldogs 9.18 (72)	def.	Gold Coast 4.10 (34)	TIO Stadium (crowd: 8,724)	Report
Saturday, 19 May (7:50 pm)	Essendon 19.14 (128)	def.	Richmond 15.19 (109)	MCG (crowd: 80,900)	Report
Sunday, 20 May (1:10 pm)	Brisbane Lions 19.18 (132)	def.	Greater Western Sydney 5.10 (40)	The Gabba (crowd: 16,049)	Report
Sunday, 20 May (3:15 pm)	Carlton 8.7 (55)	def. by	Adelaide 19.10 (124)	Etihad Stadium (crowd: 35,917)	Report
Sunday, 20 May (2:40 pm)	West Coast 18.13 (121)	def.	St Kilda 13.13 (91)	Patersons Stadium (crowd: 38,174)	Report
Sydney recorded its largest winning margin in any match since round 7, 2006.; Adelaide won its first match in Victoria since round 22, 2009, ending a losing streak of fifteen games.

=== Round 9 ===
	Round 9
Friday, 25 May (7:50 pm)	Western Bulldogs 11.9 (75)	def. by	Geelong 14.11 (95)	Etihad Stadium (crowd: 29,118)	Report
Saturday, 26 May (1:45 pm)	Richmond 21.11 (137)	def.	Hawthorn 10.15 (75)	MCG (crowd: 51,617)	Report
Saturday, 26 May (2:10 pm)	Gold Coast 10.10 (70)	def. by	Port Adelaide 17.16 (118)	Metricon Stadium (crowd: 12,416)	Report
Saturday, 26 May (4:40 pm)	St Kilda 16.15 (111)	def.	Sydney 12.11 (83)	Etihad Stadium (crowd: 34,737)	Report
Saturday, 26 May (7:10 pm)	Adelaide 6.11 (49)	def. by	Collingwood 10.15 (75)	AAMI Stadium (crowd: 44,238)	Report
Saturday, 26 May (7:40 pm)	Greater Western Sydney 7.11 (53)	def. by	Essendon 18.11 (119)	Škoda Stadium (crowd: 11,887)	Report
Sunday, 27 May (1:10 pm)	North Melbourne 17.10 (112)	def.	Brisbane Lions 15.6 (96)	Etihad Stadium (crowd: 19,988)	Report
Sunday, 27 May (3:15 pm)	Carlton 15.17 (107)	def.	Melbourne 6.13 (49)	MCG (crowd: 28,371)	Report
Sunday, 27 May (2:40 pm)	West Coast 11.18 (84)	def.	Fremantle 5.6 (36)	Patersons Stadium (crowd: 40,905)	Report
The match between Greater Western Sydney and Essendon was the first AFL match played at Škoda Stadium, the primary home ground for Greater Western Sydney.

=== Round 10 ===
	Round 10
Friday, 1 June (7:50 pm)	St Kilda 16.17 (113)	def. by	Richmond 18.13 (121)	Etihad Stadium (crowd: 49,337)	Report
Saturday, 2 June (1:45 pm)	Geelong 19.12 (126)	def.	Greater Western Sydney 9.7 (61)	Simonds Stadium (crowd: 17,243)	Report
Saturday, 2 June (2:10 pm)	Hawthorn 27.12 (174)	def.	North Melbourne 9.5 (59)	Aurora Stadium (crowd: 16,143)	Report
Saturday, 2 June (2:40 pm)	Fremantle 12.10 (82)	def. by	Adelaide 17.9 (111)	Patersons Stadium (crowd: 31,392)	Report
Saturday, 2 June (7:10 pm)	Port Adelaide 14.15 (99)	def.	Carlton 6.9 (45)	AAMI Stadium (crowd: 24,476)	Report
Saturday, 2 June (7:40 pm)	Essendon 6.16 (52)	def. by	Melbourne 8.10 (58)	MCG (crowd: 42,987)	Report
Sunday, 3 June (1:10 pm)	Brisbane Lions 16.6 (102)	def.	West Coast 15.10 (100)	The Gabba (crowd: 15,546)	Report
Sunday, 3 June (3:15 pm)	Sydney 20.12 (132)	def.	Western Bulldogs 5.10 (40)	SCG (crowd: 13,505)	Report
Sunday, 3 June (4:40 pm)	Collingwood 23.11 (149)	def.	Gold Coast 7.10 (52)	MCG (crowd: 36,913)	Report
Richmond defeated St Kilda for the first time since round 4, 2003, ending a 14-game winless streak against St Kilda.; Hawthorn recorded its largest ever victory over North Melbourne, by 115 points.; Lance Franklin (Hawthorn) scored 13 goals, the most by any player in a match since Scott Cummings (West Coast) kicked 14 goals in round 5, 2000.; Sydney recorded its lowest home crowd of 13,505 since round 2, 1996.; Gary Ablett's 53 disposals (Gold Coast) equalled Greg Williams' (Sydney) record set in 1989. This was later surpassed by Tom Mitchell who recorded 54 disposals in 2018.

=== Round 11 ===
	Round 11
Friday, 8 June (7:50 pm)	Carlton 11.19 (85)	def. by	Geelong 14.13 (97)	Etihad Stadium (crowd: 47,632)	Report
Saturday, 9 June (1:40 pm)	Richmond 9.12 (66)	def. by	Fremantle 12.6 (78)	MCG (crowd: 43,801)	Report
Saturday, 9 June (4:40 pm)	Gold Coast 7.7 (49)	def. by	St Kilda 21.18 (144)	Metricon Stadium (crowd: 12,534)	Report
Saturday, 9 June (7:40 pm)	Essendon 11.16 (82)	def. by	Sydney 13.8 (86)	Etihad Stadium (crowd: 42,785)	Report
Sunday, 10 June (4:10 pm)	Port Adelaide 9.8 (62)	def. by	Hawthorn 16.12 (108)	AAMI Stadium (crowd: 26,638)	Report
Monday, 11 June (3:15 pm)	Melbourne 13.9 (87)	def. by	Collingwood 19.15 (129)	MCG (crowd: 64,250)	Report
	Bye; Adelaide, Brisbane Lions, Greater Western Sydney, North Melbourne, West Coast, Western Bulldogs
Essendon had the chance to win the game by kicking a goal after the siren after a late comeback. Courtenay Dempsey, who had marked the ball on the 50-metre line two seconds before the siren went, chose to play on while the siren went, which resulted in the Sydney win.; Fremantle won its first game at the Melbourne Cricket Ground since round 4, 2007, ending a ten-match losing streak at the venue.

=== Round 12 ===
	Round 12
Thursday, 14 June (5:40 pm)	West Coast 10.19 (79)	def.	Carlton 10.9 (69)	Patersons Stadium (crowd: 34,224)	Report
Friday, 15 June (8:10 pm)	Adelaide 17.13 (115)	def.	St Kilda 16.15 (111)	AAMI Stadium (crowd: 36,394)	Report
Saturday, 16 June (2:10 pm)	Greater Western Sydney 12.2 (74)	def. by	Richmond 11.20 (86)	Škoda Stadium (crowd: 7,358)	Report
Saturday, 16 June (7:40 pm)	Gold Coast 12.8 (80)	def. by	North Melbourne 11.21 (87)	Metricon Stadium (crowd: 10,170)	Report
Sunday, 17 June (1:10 pm)	Hawthorn 19.21 (135)	def.	Brisbane Lions 11.4 (70)	MCG (crowd: 35,492)	Report
Sunday, 17 June (4:40 pm)	Western Bulldogs 13.17 (95)	def.	Port Adelaide 8.9 (57)	Etihad Stadium (crowd: 16,036)	Report
	Bye; Collingwood, Essendon, Fremantle, Geelong, Melbourne, Sydney

=== Round 13 ===
	Round 13
Friday, 22 June (7:50 pm)	Sydney 12.8 (80)	def.	Geelong 11.8 (74)	SCG (crowd: 27,400)	Report
Saturday, 23 June (1:40 pm)	Western Bulldogs 7.14 (56)	def. by	Brisbane Lions 18.6 (114)	Etihad Stadium (crowd: 20,146)	Report
Saturday, 23 June (4:40 pm)	Collingwood 12.13 (85)	def.	West Coast 12.10 (82)	MCG (crowd: 62,957)	Report
Saturday, 23 June (5:40 pm)	Fremantle 14.5 (89)	def. by	Essendon 17.11 (113)	Patersons Stadium (crowd: 34,567)	Report
Sunday, 24 June (3:15 pm)	Melbourne 20.15 (135)	def.	Greater Western Sydney 9.3 (57)	MCG (crowd: 20,070)	Report
Sunday, 24 June (4:40 pm)	North Melbourne 17.19 (121)	def.	Adelaide 13.11 (89)	Etihad Stadium (crowd: 18,866)	Report
	Bye; Carlton, Gold Coast, Hawthorn, Port Adelaide, Richmond, St Kilda

=== Round 14 ===
	Round 14
Friday, 29 June (7:50 pm)	Carlton 10.10 (70)	def. by	Hawthorn 18.12 (120)	MCG (crowd: 65,047)	Report
Saturday, 30 June (1:45 pm)	Collingwood 15.17 (107)	def.	Fremantle 12.6 (78)	MCG (crowd: 44,891)	Report
Saturday, 30 June (1:40 pm)	Adelaide 17.4 (106)	def.	Richmond 13.9 (87)	AAMI Stadium (crowd: 33,780)	Report
Saturday, 30 June (2:40 pm)	West Coast 25.16 (166)	def.	Gold Coast 5.10 (40)	Patersons Stadium (crowd: 34,592)	Report
Saturday, 30 June (7:40 pm)	Sydney 19.18 (132)	def.	Greater Western Sydney 5.8 (38)	ANZ Stadium (crowd: 22,565)	Report
Saturday, 30 June (7:40 pm)	Essendon 21.14 (140)	def.	Western Bulldogs 8.8 (56)	Etihad Stadium (crowd: 40,824)	Report
Sunday, 1 July (1:10 pm)	Geelong 14.15 (99)	def.	Port Adelaide 8.13 (61)	Simonds Stadium (crowd: 13,736)	Report
Sunday, 1 July (3:15 pm)	Brisbane Lions 18.14 (122)	def.	Melbourne 8.13 (61)	The Gabba (crowd: 22,114)	Report
Sunday, 1 July (4:40 pm)	St Kilda 15.13 (103)	def. by	North Melbourne 21.10 (136)	Etihad Stadium (crowd: 33,106)	Report

=== Round 15 ===
	Round 15
Friday, 6 July (7:50 pm)	Collingwood 8.14 (62)	def. by	Carlton 12.13 (85)	MCG (crowd: 75,755)	Report
Saturday, 7 July (1:45 pm)	North Melbourne 13.6 (84)	def. by	West Coast 12.14 (86)	Blundstone Arena (crowd: 14,113)	Report
Saturday, 7 July (2:10 pm)	Melbourne 11.12 (78)	def. by	Richmond 13.23 (101)	MCG (crowd: 46,773)	Report
Saturday, 7 July (4:40 pm)	Sydney 16.14 (110)	def.	Brisbane Lions 9.9 (63)	SCG (crowd: 19,419)	Report
Saturday, 7 July (7:10 pm)	Port Adelaide 8.10 (58)	def. by	Adelaide 17.14 (116)	AAMI Stadium (crowd: 34,829)	Report
Saturday, 7 July (7:40 pm)	St Kilda 21.7 (133)	def.	Essendon 8.14 (62)	Etihad Stadium (crowd: 45,838)	Report
Sunday, 8 July (1:10 pm)	Hawthorn 28.25 (193)	def.	Greater Western Sydney 4.7 (31)	MCG (crowd: 26,518)	Report
Sunday, 8 July (3:15 pm)	Gold Coast 13.18 (96)	def. by	Geelong 15.20 (110)	Metricon Stadium (crowd: 15,824)	Report
Sunday, 8 July (2:40 pm)	Fremantle 14.11 (95)	def.	Western Bulldogs 8.9 (57)	Patersons Stadium (crowd: 30,420)	Report
Kade Simpson (Carlton) sustained a broken jaw against Collingwood, which resulted in the end of a streak of 158 consecutive matches played, the longest active streak in the competition at the time.; Greater Western Sydney suffered its heaviest ever defeat, losing by 162 points.

=== Round 16 ===
	Round 16
Friday, 13 July (7:50 pm)	North Melbourne 24.5 (149)	def.	Carlton 14.12 (96)	Etihad Stadium (crowd: 46,423)	Report
Saturday, 14 July (1:45 pm)	Melbourne 12.11 (83)	def. by	Fremantle 18.9 (117)	Etihad Stadium (crowd: 13,284)	Report
Saturday, 14 July (1:40 pm)	Port Adelaide 11.11 (77)	def. by	Essendon 19.13 (127)	AAMI Stadium (crowd: 17,344)	Report
Saturday, 14 July (4:40 pm)	Richmond 13.10 (88)	def. by	Gold Coast 13.12 (90)	Cazaly's Stadium (crowd: 10,961)	Report
Saturday, 14 July (7:40 pm)	Brisbane Lions 14.8 (92)	def. by	St Kilda 16.9 (105)	The Gabba (crowd: 19,228)	Report
Saturday, 14 July (7:40 pm)	Geelong 10.19 (79)	def. by	Collingwood 17.8 (110)	MCG (crowd: 61,717)	Report
Sunday, 15 July (1:10 pm)	Greater Western Sydney 8.11 (59)	def. by	Adelaide 27.16 (178)	Škoda Stadium (crowd: 7,669)	Report
Sunday, 15 July (3:15 pm)	Western Bulldogs 6.8 (44)	def. by	Hawthorn 17.14 (116)	Etihad Stadium (crowd: 24,754)	Report
Sunday, 15 July (2:40 pm)	West Coast 10.9 (69)	def. by	Sydney 18.13 (121)	Patersons Stadium (crowd: 39,152)	Report
Gold Coast's win ended a twenty-one match losing streak, and gave Gold Coast its first win for the season after fourteen losses; it was the longest losing streak by any team since Fitzroy lost twenty-one matches from 1995 to 1996. Gold Coast's previous win, in round 17, 2011, was also against Richmond in Cairns. The two-point win was completed in dramatic circumstances when rugby league convert Karmichael Hunt kicked a goal after the siren to win the match.; West Coast lost its first match at Patersons Stadium since round 3, 2011, ending an eighteen-match winning streak at the venue.

=== Round 17 ===
	Round 17
Friday, 20 July (7:50 pm)	Geelong 20.14 (134)	def.	Essendon 10.7 (67)	Etihad Stadium (crowd: 50,066)	Report
Saturday, 21 July (1:45 pm)	Collingwood 13.13 (91)	def. by	Hawthorn 21.12 (138)	MCG (crowd: 83,714)	Report
Saturday, 21 July (1:40 pm)	Adelaide 19.10 (124)	def.	West Coast 11.9 (75)	AAMI Stadium (crowd: 40,724)	Report
Saturday, 21 July (4:40 pm)	Gold Coast 5.18 (48)	def. by	Brisbane Lions 8.11 (59)	Metricon Stadium (crowd: 16,550)	Report
Saturday, 21 July (7:10 pm)	Melbourne 8.8 (56)	def. by	Port Adelaide 12.12 (84)	TIO Stadium (crowd: 6,714)	Report
Saturday, 21 July (7:40 pm)	Western Bulldogs 12.12 (84)	def. by	Carlton 16.6 (102)	Etihad Stadium (crowd: 24,615)	Report
Sunday, 22 July (1:10 pm)	Sydney 15.15 (105)	def.	St Kilda 10.16 (76)	SCG (crowd: 26,834)	Report
Sunday, 22 July (3:15 pm)	Richmond 14.15 (99)	def. by	North Melbourne 15.13 (103)	MCG (crowd: 47,432)	Report
Sunday, 22 July (2:40 pm)	Fremantle 18.24 (132)	def.	Greater Western Sydney 5.7 (37)	Patersons Stadium (crowd: 28,767)	Report

=== Round 18 ===
	Round 18
Friday, 27 July (7:50 pm)	Essendon 12.14 (86)	def. by	Hawthorn 27.18 (180)	Etihad Stadium (crowd: 44,899)	Report
Saturday, 28 July (1:45 pm)	Geelong 15.12 (102)	def.	Adelaide 11.9 (75)	Simonds Stadium (crowd: 18,377)	Report
Saturday, 28 July (2:10 pm)	North Melbourne 19.13 (127)	def.	Melbourne 11.7 (73)	Etihad Stadium (crowd: 20,816)	Report
Saturday, 28 July (4:40 pm)	Greater Western Sydney 7.12 (54)	def. by	Collingwood 26.18 (174)	Škoda Stadium (crowd: 8,102)	Report
Saturday, 28 July (7:40 pm)	Gold Coast 8.6 (54)	def. by	Sydney 19.12 (126)	Metricon Stadium (crowd: 11,169)	Report
Saturday, 28 July (7:40 pm)	Carlton 14.11 (95)	def.	Richmond 13.13 (91)	MCG (crowd: 46,013)	Report
Sunday, 29 July (12:40 pm)	Port Adelaide 6.12 (48)	def. by	Fremantle 11.9 (75)	AAMI Stadium (crowd: 14,583)	Report
Sunday, 29 July (3:15 pm)	St Kilda 16.22 (118)	def.	Western Bulldogs 6.6 (42)	Etihad Stadium (crowd: 23,498)	Report
Sunday, 29 July (2:40 pm)	West Coast 28.7 (175)	def.	Brisbane Lions 12.5 (77)	Patersons Stadium (crowd: 35,767)	Report
Collingwood's score of 26.18 (174) was its highest since round 9, 1990.

=== Round 19 ===
	Round 19
Friday, 3 August (7:50 pm)	Hawthorn 17.14 (116)	def. by	Geelong 18.10 (118)	MCG (crowd: 65,287)	Report
Saturday, 4 August (1:45 pm)	Western Bulldogs 8.13 (61)	def. by	North Melbourne 18.7 (115)	Etihad Stadium (crowd: 21,599)	Report
Saturday, 4 August (2:10 pm)	Greater Western Sydney 16.11 (107)	def.	Port Adelaide 10.13 (73)	Škoda Stadium (crowd: 6,811)	Report
Saturday, 4 August (2:40 pm)	Fremantle 17.11 (113)	def.	West Coast 6.12 (48)	Patersons Stadium (crowd: 39,694)	Report
Saturday, 4 August (7:40 pm)	Brisbane Lions 12.12 (84)	def. by	Richmond 20.12 (132)	The Gabba (crowd: 22,311)	Report
Saturday, 4 August (7:40 pm)	Collingwood 12.19 (91)	def.	St Kilda 13.7 (85)	MCG (crowd: 57,873)	Report
Sunday, 5 August (1:10 pm)	Melbourne 16.12 (108)	def.	Gold Coast 9.12 (66)	MCG (crowd: 18,097)	Report
Sunday, 5 August (3:15 pm)	Carlton 10.11 (71)	def. by	Sydney 14.9 (93)	Etihad Stadium (crowd: 36,942)	Report
Sunday, 5 August (4:10 pm)	Adelaide 16.8 (104)	def.	Essendon 15.10 (100)	AAMI Stadium (crowd: 40,030)	Report
Geelong defeated Hawthorn after Tom Hawkins kicked the winning goal after the siren.; Kevin Sheedy (Greater Western Sydney) contested his 1000th senior VFL/AFL sanctioned game, becoming the first person to do so. The total includes premiership matches, pre-season and night matches, state representative matches, and national representative matches under international rules.; Greater Western Sydney ended a ten-game losing streak with its win against Port Adelaide.; The day after Port Adelaide's loss to Greater Western Sydney, the club determined that the tenures of Brett Duncanson as president and Matthew Primus as coach would both be terminated at the end of the season; Primus opted to step down immediately, and was replaced by Garry Hocking as caretaker coach.

=== Round 20 ===
	Round 20
Friday, 10 August (6:40 pm)	West Coast 16.6 (102)	def.	Geelong 15.7 (97)	Patersons Stadium (crowd: 37,812)	Report
Saturday, 11 August (1:45 pm)	St Kilda 16.11 (107)	def.	Melbourne 12.10 (82)	MCG (crowd: 23,464)	Report
Saturday, 11 August (1:40 pm)	Adelaide 17.17 (119)	def.	Fremantle 14.7 (91)	AAMI Stadium (crowd: 35,027)	Report
Saturday, 11 August (4:40 pm)	Gold Coast 16.13 (109)	def.	Greater Western Sydney 12.7 (79)	Metricon Stadium (crowd: 14,657)	Report
Saturday, 11 August (7:40 pm)	Carlton 17.11 (113)	def.	Brisbane Lions 10.17 (77)	Etihad Stadium (crowd: 25,977)	Report
Saturday, 11 August (7:40 pm)	Sydney 9.16 (70)	def. by	Collingwood 12.6 (78)	ANZ Stadium (crowd: 45,827)	Report
Sunday, 12 August (1:10 pm)	Hawthorn 24.15 (159)	def.	Port Adelaide 13.9 (87)	Aurora Stadium (crowd: 14,431)	Report
Sunday, 12 August (3:15 pm)	Richmond 22.18 (150)	def.	Western Bulldogs 12.8 (80)	MCG (crowd: 28,286)	Report
Sunday, 12 August (4:40 pm)	Essendon 11.10 (76)	def. by	North Melbourne 15.10 (100)	Etihad Stadium (crowd: 42,674)	Report
Gold Coast recorded its first ever win at its primary home ground, Metricon Stadium, after losing its first seventeen matches there from 2011 to 2012.

=== Round 21 ===
	Round 21
Friday, 17 August (7:50 pm)	Geelong 18.15 (123)	def.	St Kilda 11.15 (81)	Etihad Stadium (crowd: 38,169)	Report
Saturday, 18 August (1:45 pm)	Essendon 8.12 (60)	def. by	Carlton 24.12 (156)	MCG (crowd: 59,381)	Report
Saturday, 18 August (2:10 pm)	Greater Western Sydney 9.5 (59)	def. by	Melbourne 11.18 (84)	Manuka Oval (crowd: 7,561)	Report
Saturday, 18 August (2:40 pm)	Fremantle 13.16 (94)	def.	Richmond 11.6 (72)	Patersons Stadium (crowd: 32,721)	Report
Saturday, 18 August (7:40 pm)	Brisbane Lions 13.17 (95)	def.	Adelaide 12.13 (85)	The Gabba (crowd: 18,979)	Report
Saturday, 18 August (7:40 pm)	Collingwood 8.13 (61)	def. by	North Melbourne 13.13 (91)	Etihad Stadium (crowd: 44,956)	Report
Sunday, 19 August (12:40 pm)	Port Adelaide 6.14 (50)	def. by	West Coast 14.14 (98)	AAMI Stadium (crowd: 13,683)	Report
Sunday, 19 August (3:15 pm)	Western Bulldogs 13.7 (85)	def. by	Sydney 26.11 (167)	Etihad Stadium (crowd: 19,396)	Report
Sunday, 19 August (4:40 pm)	Hawthorn 19.15 (129)	def.	Gold Coast 10.5 (65)	MCG (crowd: 23,098)	Report
Port Adelaide recorded its lowest ever home crowd of 13,683 at AAMI Stadium.; Sydney recorded its highest score since round 15, 2007.

=== Round 22 ===
	Round 22
Friday, 24 August (7:50 pm)	Richmond 13.24 (102)	def.	Essendon 8.9 (57)	MCG (crowd: 47,590)	Report
Saturday, 25 August (1:45 pm)	St Kilda 25.13 (163)	def.	Greater Western Sydney 5.5 (35)	Etihad Stadium (crowd: 17,327)	Report
Saturday, 25 August (1:40 pm)	Port Adelaide 14.9 (93)	def. by	Brisbane Lions 16.8 (104)	AAMI Stadium (crowd: 13,953)	Report
Saturday, 25 August (4:40 pm)	Sydney 14.11 (95)	def. by	Hawthorn 15.12 (102)	SCG (crowd: 31,167)	Report
Saturday, 25 August (7:40 pm)	Gold Coast 15.8 (98)	def.	Carlton 11.20 (86)	Metricon Stadium (crowd: 15,251)	Report
Saturday, 25 August (5:40 pm)	West Coast 15.17 (107)	def.	Collingwood 8.10 (58)	Patersons Stadium (crowd: 40,527)	Report
Sunday, 26 August (1:10 pm)	Geelong 16.11 (107)	def.	Western Bulldogs 11.7 (73)	Simonds Stadium (crowd: 18,047)	Report
Sunday, 26 August (3:15 pm)	North Melbourne 12.7 (79)	def. by	Fremantle 20.12 (132)	Etihad Stadium (crowd: 26,482)	Report
Sunday, 26 August (4:40 pm)	Melbourne 11.15 (81)	def. by	Adelaide 22.18 (150)	MCG (crowd: 18,450)	Report
St Kilda recorded its third highest winning margin in its history. The half time margin of 93 points was also St Kilda's biggest half time lead in its history.; Following the loss to Gold Coast, Brett Ratten was sacked as Carlton coach, effective at the end of the season.

=== Round 23 ===
	Round 23
Friday, 31 August (7:50 pm)	Hawthorn 14.11 (95)	def.	West Coast 10.10 (70)	MCG (crowd: 50,023)	Report
Saturday, 1 September (1:45 pm)	Geelong 17.10 (112)	def.	Sydney 11.12 (78)	Simonds Stadium (crowd: 20,045)	Report
Saturday, 1 September (1:40 pm)	Adelaide 22.21 (153)	def.	Gold Coast 9.8 (62)	AAMI Stadium (crowd: 35,463)	Report
Saturday, 1 September (4:40 pm)	Greater Western Sydney 11.11 (77)	def. by	North Melbourne 16.9 (105)	Škoda Stadium (crowd: 6,696)	Report
Saturday, 1 September (5:40 pm)	Fremantle 14.17 (101)	def.	Melbourne 5.10 (40)	Patersons Stadium (crowd: 32,687)	Report
Saturday, 1 September (7:40 pm)	Essendon 10.12 (72)	def. by	Collingwood 14.20 (104)	MCG (crowd: 56,491)	Report
Sunday, 2 September (1:10 pm)	Carlton 12.19 (91)	def. by	St Kilda 16.10 (106)	Etihad Stadium (crowd: 31,393)	Report
Sunday, 2 September (3:15 pm)	Richmond 16.10 (106)	drew with	Port Adelaide 16.10 (106)	MCG (crowd: 27,893)	Report
Sunday, 2 September (4:40 pm)	Brisbane Lions 19.14 (128)	def.	Western Bulldogs 9.7 (61)	The Gabba (crowd: 18,289)	Report
Hawthorn secured the minor premiership for the first time since 1989.; Greater Western Sydney's points-for total of 1270 was the lowest ever in a 22-match home-and-away season, beating the previous lowest of 1452 set by Fitzroy in 1996. It was the lowest in any season since North Melbourne scored 1266 points in twenty games set in 1968.; Greater Western Sydney's percentage of 46.17 was the lowest since St Kilda's 45.39 in 1955.

== Win/loss table ==
Team	1	2	3	4	5	6	7	8	9	10	11	12	13	14	15	16	17	18	19	20	21	22	23	F1	F2	F3	GF	Ladder
Adelaide	GCS +69	**WB** **+18**	Haw −56	**GWS** **+46**	**PA** **+19**	Syd +5	**Geel** **+50**	Carl +69	**Coll** **−26**	Frem +29	X	**StK** **+4**	NM −32	**Rich** **+19**	PA +58	GWS +119	**WCE** **+49**	Geel −27	**Ess** **+4**	**Frem** **+28**	BL −10	Melb +69	**GCS** **+91**	**Syd** **−29**	**Frem** **+10**	Haw −5	X	**2**
Brisbane Lions	Melb +41	**Carl** **−91**	Frem −29	**GCS** **+65**	**Geel** **−39**	Ess −67	**Coll** **−58**	**GWS** **+92**	NM −16	**WCE** **+2**	X	Haw −65	WB +58	**Melb** **+61**	Syd −47	**StK** **−13**	GCS +11	WCE −98	**Rich** **−48**	Carl −36	**Adel** **+10**	PA +11	**WB** **+67**	X	X	X	X	13
Carlton	Rich +44	BL +91	**Coll** **+60**	**Ess** **−30**	Frem +8	**GWS** **+67**	StK −24	**Adel** **−69**	**Melb** **+58**	PA −54	**Geel** **−12**	WCE −10	X	Haw −50	Coll +23	NM −53	WB +18	**Rich** **+4**	**Syd** **−22**	**BL** **+36**	Ess +96	GCS −12	**StK** **−15**	X	X	X	X	10
Collingwood	Haw −22	**Rich** **+21**	Carl −60	**PA** **+24**	**Ess** **+1**	WB +21	BL +58	**Geel** **+12**	Adel +26	**GCS** **+97**	Melb +42	X	**WCE** **+3**	**Frem** **+29**	**Carl** **−23**	Geel +31	**Haw** **−47**	GWS +120	**StK** **+6**	Syd +8	**NM** **−30**	WCE −49	Ess +32	Haw −38	**WCE** **+13**	Syd −26	X	**4**
Essendon	NM +2	**PA** **+25**	GCS +17	Carl +30	Coll −1	**BL** **+67**	**WCE** **+61**	**Rich** **+19**	GWS +66	**Melb** **−6**	**Syd** **−4**	X	Frem +24	**WB** **+84**	StK −71	PA +50	Geel −67	**Haw** **−94**	Adel −4	**NM** **−24**	**Carl** **−96**	Rich −45	**Coll** **−32**	X	X	X	X	11
Fremantle	**Geel** **+4**	Syd −13	**BL** **+29**	StK +13	**Carl** **−8**	GCS +7	**PA** **+40**	Haw −56	WCE −48	**Adel** **−29**	Rich +12	X	**Ess** **−24**	Coll −29	**WB** **+38**	Melb +34	**GWS** **+95**	PA +27	**WCE** **+65**	Adel −28	**Rich** **+22**	NM +53	**Melb** **+61**	Geel +16	Adel −10	X	X	**7**
Geelong	Frem −4	**Haw** **+2**	NM −17	**Rich** **+10**	BL +38	**Melb** **+43**	Adel −50	Coll −12	WB +20	**GWS** **+65**	Carl +12	X	Syd −6	**PA** **+38**	GCS +14	**Coll** **−31**	**Ess** **+67**	**Adel** **+27**	Haw +2	WCE −5	**StK** **+42**	**WB** **+34**	**Syd** **+34**	**Frem** **−16**	X	X	X	**6**
Gold Coast	**Adel** **−69**	StK −92	**Ess** **−17**	BL −65	NM −34	**Frem** **−7**	GWS −27	WB −38	**PA** **−48**	Coll −97	**StK** **−95**	**NM** **−7**	X	WCE −126	**Geel** **−14**	Rich +2	**BL** **−11**	**Syd** **−72**	Melb −42	**GWS** **+30**	Haw −64	**Carl** **+12**	Adel −91	X	X	X	X	17
GWS Giants	**Syd** **−63**	NM −129	**WCE** **−81**	Adel −46	**WB** **−42**	Carl −67	**GCS** **+27**	BL −92	**Ess** **−66**	Geel −65	X	**Rich** **−12**	Melb −78	Syd −94	Haw −162	**Adel** **−119**	Frem −95	**Coll** **−120**	**PA** **+34**	GCS −30	**Melb** **−25**	StK −128	**NM** **−28**	X	X	X	X	18
Hawthorn	**Coll** **+22**	Geel −2	**Adel** **+56**	WCE −5	**Syd** **−37**	StK +35	Melb +66	**Frem** **+56**	Rich −62	**NM** **+115**	PA +46	**BL** **+65**	X	**Carl** **+50**	**GWS** **+162**	WB +72	Coll +47	Ess +94	**Geel** **−2**	**PA** **+72**	**GCS** **+64**	Syd +7	**WCE** **+25**	**Coll** **+38**	X	**Adel** **+5**	Syd −10	**1**
Melbourne	**BL** **−41**	WCE −108	Rich −59	**WB** **−21**	**StK** **−18**	Geel −43	**Haw** **−66**	Syd −101	Carl −58	Ess +6	**Coll** **−42**	X	**GWS** **+78**	BL −61	**Rich** **−23**	**Frem** **−34**	**PA** **−28**	NM −54	**GCS** **+42**	StK −25	GWS +25	**Adel** **−69**	Frem −61	X	X	X	X	16
North Melbourne	**Ess** **−2**	**GWS** **+129**	**Geel** **+17**	Syd −36	**GCS** **+34**	WCE −25	**WB** **−18**	PA −2	**BL** **+16**	Haw −115	X	GCS +7	**Adel** **+32**	StK +33	**WCE** **−2**	**Carl** **+53**	Rich +4	**Melb** **+54**	WB +54	Ess +24	Coll +30	**Frem** **−53**	GWS +28	WCE −96	X	X	X	**8**
Port Adelaide	**StK** **+4**	Ess −25	**Syd** **−22**	Coll −24	Adel −19	**Rich** **−37**	Frem −40	**NM** **+2**	GCS +48	**Carl** **+54**	**Haw** **−46**	WB −38	X	Geel −38	**Adel** **−58**	**Ess** **−50**	Melb +28	**Frem** **−27**	GWS −34	Haw −72	**WCE** **−48**	**BL** **−11**	Rich; 0	X	X	X	X	14
Richmond	**Carl** **−44**	Coll −21	**Melb** **+59**	Geel −10	**WCE** **−10**	PA +37	**Syd** **+29**	Ess −19	**Haw** **+62**	StK +8	**Frem** **−12**	GWS +12	X	Adel −19	Melb +23	**GCS** **−2**	**NM** **−4**	Carl −4	BL +48	**WB** **+70**	Frem −22	**Ess** **+45**	**PA**; **0**	X	X	X	X	12
St Kilda	PA −4	**GCS** **+92**	WB +63	**Frem** **−13**	Melb +18	**Haw** **−35**	**Carl** **+24**	WCE −30	**Syd** **+28**	**Rich** **−8**	GCS +95	Adel −4	X	**NM** **−33**	**Ess** **+71**	BL +13	Syd −29	**WB** **+76**	Coll −6	**Melb** **+25**	Geel −42	**GWS** **+128**	Carl +15	X	X	X	X	9
Sydney	GWS +63	**Frem** **+13**	PA +25	**NM** **+36**	Haw +37	**Adel** **−5**	Rich −29	**Melb** **+101**	StK −28	**WB** **+92**	Ess +4	X	**Geel** **+6**	**GWS** **+94**	**BL** **+47**	WCE +52	**StK** **+29**	GCS +72	Carl +22	**Coll** **−8**	WB +82	**Haw** **−7**	Geel −34	Adel +29	X	**Coll** **+26**	Haw +10	**3**
West Coast	WB +49	**Melb** **+108**	GWS +81	**Haw** **+5**	Rich +10	**NM** **+25**	Ess −61	**StK** **+30**	**Frem** **+48**	BL −2	X	**Carl** **+10**	Coll −3	**GCS** **+126**	NM +2	**Syd** **−52**	Adel −49	**BL** **+98**	Frem −65	**Geel** **+5**	PA +48	**Coll** **+49**	Haw −25	**NM** **+96**	Coll −13	X	X	**5**
Western Bulldogs	**WCE** **−49**	Adel −18	**StK** **−63**	Melb +21	GWS +42	**Coll** **−21**	NM +18	**GCS** **+38**	**Geel** **−20**	Syd −92	X	**PA** **+38**	**BL** **−58**	Ess −84	Frem −38	**Haw** **−72**	**Carl** **−18**	StK −76	**NM** **−54**	Rich −70	**Syd** **−82**	Geel −34	BL −67	X	X	X	X	15
Team	1	2	3	4	5	6	7	8	9	10	11	12	13	14	15	16	17	18	19	20	21	22	23	F1	F2	F3	GF	Ladder

+	Win	Qualified for finals
−	Loss	Eliminated

Bold – Home game
X – Bye
Opponent for round listed above margin

== Ladder ==
2012 AFL ladder
Pos	Team	Pld	W	L	D	PF	PA	PP	Pts	
1	Hawthorn	22	17	5	0	2679	1733	154.6	68	Finals series
2	Adelaide	22	17	5	0	2428	1833	132.5	68	Finals series
3	Sydney (P)	22	16	6	0	2290	1629	140.6	64	Finals series
4	Collingwood	22	16	6	0	2123	1823	116.5	64	Finals series
5	West Coast	22	15	7	0	2244	1807	124.2	60	Finals series
6	Geelong	22	15	7	0	2209	1886	117.1	60	Finals series
7	Fremantle	22	14	8	0	1956	1691	115.7	56	Finals series
8	North Melbourne	22	14	8	0	2359	2097	112.5	56	Finals series
9	St Kilda	22	12	10	0	2347	1903	123.3	48	
10	Carlton	22	11	11	0	2079	1925	108.0	44	
11	Essendon	22	11	11	0	2091	2090	100.0	44	
12	Richmond	22	10	11	1	2169	1943	111.6	42	
13	Brisbane Lions	22	10	12	0	1904	2092	91.0	40	
14	Port Adelaide	22	5	16	1	1691	2144	78.9	22	
15	Western Bulldogs	22	5	17	0	1542	2301	67.0	20	
16	Melbourne	22	4	18	0	1580	2341	67.5	16	
17	Gold Coast	22	3	19	0	1509	2481	60.8	12	
18	Greater Western Sydney	22	2	20	0	1270	2751	46.2	8	

Rules for classification: 1) points; 2) percentage; 3) number of points for.
(P) Premiers

=== Ladder progression ===
Numbers highlighted in green indicate that the team finished the round inside the top 8.
Numbers highlighted in blue indicates the team finished first on the ladder in that round.
Numbers highlighted in red indicates the team finished in last place on the ladder in that round.
Underlined numbers indicate that the team had a bye during that round.

Team ╲ Round	1	2	3	4	5	6	7	8	9	10	11	12	13	14	15	16	17	18	19	20	21	22	23
Hawthorn	4	4	8	8	8	12	16	20	20	24	28	32	32	36	40	44	48	52	52	56	60	64	68
Adelaide	4	8	8	12	16	20	24	28	28	32	32	36	36	40	44	48	52	52	56	60	60	64	68
Sydney	4	8	12	16	20	20	20	24	24	28	32	32	36	40	44	48	52	56	60	60	64	64	64
Collingwood	0	4	4	8	12	16	20	24	28	32	36	36	40	44	44	48	48	52	56	60	60	60	64
West Coast	4	8	12	16	20	24	24	28	32	32	32	36	36	40	44	44	44	48	48	52	56	60	60
Geelong	0	4	4	8	12	16	16	16	20	24	28	28	28	32	36	36	40	44	48	48	52	56	60
Fremantle	4	4	8	12	12	16	20	20	20	20	24	24	24	24	28	32	36	40	44	44	48	52	56
North Melbourne	0	4	8	8	12	12	12	12	16	16	16	20	24	28	28	32	36	40	44	48	52	52	56
St Kilda	0	4	8	8	12	12	16	16	20	20	24	24	24	24	28	32	32	36	36	40	40	44	48
Carlton	4	8	12	12	16	20	20	20	24	24	24	24	24	24	28	28	32	36	36	40	44	44	44
Essendon	4	8	12	16	16	20	24	28	32	32	32	32	36	40	40	44	44	44	44	44	44	44	44
Richmond	0	0	4	4	4	8	12	12	16	20	20	24	24	24	28	28	28	28	32	36	36	40	42
Brisbane Lions	4	4	4	8	8	8	8	12	12	16	16	16	20	24	24	24	28	28	28	28	32	36	40
Port Adelaide	4	4	4	4	4	4	4	8	12	16	16	16	16	16	16	16	20	20	20	20	20	20	22
Western Bulldogs	0	0	0	4	8	8	12	16	16	16	16	20	20	20	20	20	20	20	20	20	20	20	20
Melbourne	0	0	0	0	0	0	0	0	0	4	4	4	8	8	8	8	8	8	12	12	16	16	16
Gold Coast	0	0	0	0	0	0	0	0	0	0	0	0	0	0	0	4	4	4	4	8	8	12	12
Greater Western Sydney	0	0	0	0	0	0	4	4	4	4	4	4	4	4	4	4	4	4	8	8	8	8	8

== Finals series ==
Qualifying and elimination finals
Fri, 7 Sep, MCG
1	Hawthorn	20.15 (135)
4	Collingwood	15.7 (97)
Sun, 9 Sep, Patersons
5	West Coast	24.18 (162)
8	North Melbourne	9.12 (66)
Sat, 8 Sep, MCG
6	Geelong	11.14 (80)
7	Fremantle	14.12 (96)
Sat, 8 Sep, AAMI Stadium
2	Adelaide	5.12 (42)
3	Sydney	11.5 (71)

Semi-finals
Sat, 15 Sep, MCG
Collingwood	10.13 (73)
West Coast	9.6 (60)
Fri, 14 Sep, AAMI Stadium
Adelaide	12.9 (81)
Fremantle	11.5 (71)

Preliminary finals
Sat, 22 Sep, MCG
Hawthorn	13.19 (97)
Adelaide	14.8 (92)
Fri, 21 Sep, ANZ Stadium
Sydney	13.18 (96)
Collingwood	10.10 (70)

Grand final
Sat, 29 Sep, MCG
Hawthorn	11.15 (81)
Sydney	14.7 (91)

=== Week one ===
	Qualifying Finals
Friday, 7 September (7:50 pm)	Hawthorn 20.15 (135)	def.	Collingwood 15.7 (97)	MCG (crowd: 85,625)	Report
Saturday, 8 September (2:45 pm)	Adelaide 5.12 (42)	def. by	Sydney 11.5 (71)	AAMI Stadium (crowd: 44,869)	Report

	Elimination Finals
Saturday, 8 September (7:45 pm)	Geelong 11.14 (80)	def. by	Fremantle 14.12 (96)	MCG (crowd: 44,460)	Report
Sunday, 9 September (1:15 pm)	West Coast 24.18 (162)	def.	North Melbourne 9.12 (66)	Patersons Stadium (crowd: 41,790)	Report
Adelaide recorded its lowest ever score at AAMI Stadium.

=== Week two ===
	Semi-finals
Friday, 14 September (8:15 pm)	Adelaide 12.9 (81)	def.	Fremantle 11.5 (71)	AAMI Stadium (crowd: 31,742)	Report
Saturday, 15 September (7:45 pm)	Collingwood 10.13 (73)	def.	West Coast 9.6 (60)	MCG (crowd: 65,483)	Report

=== Week three ===
	Preliminary Finals
Friday, 21 September (7:45 pm)	Sydney 13.18 (96)	def.	Collingwood 10.10 (70)	ANZ Stadium (crowd: 57,156)	Report
Saturday, 22 September (5:15 pm)	Hawthorn 13.19 (97)	def.	Adelaide 14.8 (92)	MCG (crowd: 69,146)	Report
Sydney defeated Collingwood for the first time since round 13, 2005, breaking an eleven-game losing streak.

=== Week four ===
Grand Final
Saturday, 29 September (2:30 pm)	Hawthorn	def. by	Sydney	MCG (crowd: 99,683)	Report
4.5 (29); 4.6 (30); 9.10 (64); 11.15 (81)	Q1; Q2; Q3; Final	1.4 (10); 7.4 (46); 10.5 (65); 14.7 (91)	Umpires: Simon Meredith, Brett Rosebury, Matt Stevic; Norm Smith Medal: Ryan O'Keefe; Television broadcast: Seven Network, Fox Footy (Replay); National anthem: Marina Prior

== Awards ==
- The Norm Smith Medal was awarded to Ryan O'Keefe of Sydney, who got 28 disposals.
- The Brownlow Medal was originally awarded to Jobe Watson of Essendon, who received 30 votes. On 11 November 2016, Watson relinquished the medal in the wake of the Essendon supplements saga. It was subsequently re-awarded jointly to Sam Mitchell of Hawthorn and Trent Cotchin of Richmond, who received 26 votes each, on 15 November 2016.
- The AFL Rising Star was awarded to Daniel Talia of Adelaide, who received 43 votes.
- The Coleman Medal was awarded to Jack Riewoldt of Richmond, who kicked 65 goals during the home and away season.
- The McClelland Trophy was awarded to Hawthorn.
- The Wooden Spoon was "awarded" to Greater Western Sydney.
- The AFL Players Association awards were as follows:
  - The Leigh Matthews Trophy was awarded to Gary Ablett of Gold Coast, for being the Most Valuable Player throughout the premiership season.
  - The Robert Rose Award went to Joel Selwood of Geelong and Beau Waters of West Coast, for being the Most Courageous Players throughout the premiership season.
  - The Best Captain award went to Jobe Watson of Essendon.
  - The Best First-Year Player award was won by Jeremy Cameron of Greater Western Sydney.
- The AFL Coaches Association Awards were as follows:
  - The Player of the Year Award was given to Trent Cotchin of Richmond, who received 107 votes.
  - The Allan Jeans Senior Coach of the Year Award was given to John Longmire of Sydney.
  - The Assistant Coach of the Year Award was given to Peter Sumich of Fremantle.
  - The Best Young Player Award was given to Dyson Heppell of Essendon.
- The inaugural Jim Stynes Community Leadership Award was awarded to Daniel Jackson of Richmond.

=== Coleman Medal ===
- Numbers highlighted in blue indicates the player led the Coleman that round.
- Underlined numbers indicates the player did not play that round.

	Player	1	2	3	4	5	6	7	8	9	10	11	12	13	14	15	16	17	18	19	20	21	22	23	Total
1	Jack Riewoldt	4	0	1	1	2	4	4	1	6	8	1	3	0	3	1	5	3	0	2	5	2	3	6	65
2	Tom Hawkins	4	3	4	1	6	1	0	2	3	0	1	0	1	2	4	1	5	3	6	1	6	4	4	62
2	Matthew Pavlich	3	0	1	1	1	1	4	0	0	3	6	0	3	5	6	4	7	2	8	2	3	0	2	62
4	Lance Franklin	5	2	3	1	0	5	3	1	1	13	4	5	0	4	4	0	0	0	0	0	0	4	4	59
5	Drew Petrie	2	2	0	1	3	1	3	5	3	1	0	2	2	4	0	7	7	4	5	0	3	0	2	57
6	Stephen Milne	2	2	3	1	2	1	4	1	3	1	2	3	0	2	5	3	5	1	3	2	4	5	1	56
7	Taylor Walker	5	3	0	1	6	5	3	0	0	4	0	2	3	5	0	0	0	0	4	4	4	4	0	53
8	Travis Cloke	2	3	1	4	3	2	2	2	0	3	2	0	5	2	2	1	1	6	1	3	0	0	5	50
9	Eddie Betts	2	2	5	4	1	0	2	0	5	1	4	0	0	2	4	2	2	4	0	3	2	2	1	48
10	Jonathan Brown	0	0	0	3	1	2	2	5	2	1	0	3	0	4	2	1	1	3	4	2	2	4	5	47

=== Best and fairest ===
Club	Award name	Player	Ref.
Adelaide	Malcolm Blight Medal	Scott Thompson	
Brisbane Lions	Merrett–Murray Medal	Joel Patfull	
Carlton	John Nicholls Medal	Heath Scotland	
Collingwood	Copeland Trophy	Dayne Beams	
Essendon	Crichton Medal	Jobe Watson	
Fremantle	Doig Medal	Ryan Crowley	
Geelong	Carji Greeves Medal	Tom Hawkins	
Gold Coast	Club Champion	Gary Ablett, Jr.	
Greater Western Sydney	Kevin Sheedy Medal	Callan Ward	
Hawthorn	Peter Crimmins Medal	Sam Mitchell	
Melbourne	Keith 'Bluey' Truscott Medal	Nathan Jones	
North Melbourne	Syd Barker Medal	Andrew Swallow	
Port Adelaide	John Cahill Medal	Kane Cornes	
Richmond	Jack Dyer Medal	Trent Cotchin	
St Kilda	Trevor Barker Award	Lenny Hayes	
Sydney	Bob Skilton Medal	Josh Kennedy	
West Coast	Club Champion Award	Scott Selwood	
Western Bulldogs	Charles Sutton Medal	Matthew Boyd	

=== Player milestones ===
Name	Club	Milestone	Round
Shaun Burgoyne	Hawthorn	200 AFL games	Round 3
Dustin Fletcher	Essendon	350 AFL games	Round 3
Jonathan Brown	Brisbane Lions	500 AFL goals	Round 4
Simon Black	Brisbane Lions	300 AFL games	Round 5
Stephen Milne	St Kilda	500 AFL goals	Round 5
Matthew Pavlich	Fremantle	500 AFL goals	Round 7
Chris Newman	Richmond	200 AFL games	Round 8
Lenny Hayes	St Kilda	250 AFL games	Round 9
Martin Mattner	Sydney	200 AFL games	Round 9
Ryan Hargrave	Western Bulldogs	200 AFL games	Round 10
David Wojcinski	Geelong	200 AFL games	Round 11
Nick Riewoldt	St Kilda	500 AFL goals	Round 11
Quinten Lynch	West Coast	200 AFL games	Round 13
Luke McPharlin	Fremantle	200 AFL games	Round 13
Daniel Kerr	West Coast	200 AFL games	Round 15
Stephen Milne	St Kilda	250 AFL games	Round 15
Chad Cornes	Greater Western Sydney	250 AFL games	Round 15
Lance Franklin	Hawthorn	500 AFL goals	Round 15
Kevin Sheedy	Greater Western Sydney	900 VFL/AFL games as player or coach	Round 15
Matthew Boyd	Western Bulldogs	200 AFL games	Round 16
Brendon Goddard	St Kilda	200 AFL games	Round 18
Joel Corey	Geelong	250 AFL games	Round 18
Brad Green	Melbourne	250 AFL games	Round 18
Ryan O'Keefe	Sydney	250 AFL games	Round 19
Luke Hodge	Hawthorn	200 AFL games	Round 20
Domenic Cassisi	Port Adelaide	200 AFL games	Round 20
Luke Power	Greater Western Sydney	300 AFL games	Round 21
Dean Cox	West Coast	250 AFL games	Elimination finals
Jude Bolton	Sydney	300 AFL games	Preliminary finals

== Club leadership ==
Club	Coach	Captain(s)	Vice-captain(s)	Leadership group
Adelaide	Brenton Sanderson	Nathan van Berlo	Scott Thompson	Patrick Dangerfield, Rory Sloane, Ben Rutten
Brisbane Lions	Michael Voss	Jonathan Brown	Daniel Merrett, Tom Rockliff, Jed Adcock, Josh Drummond	
Carlton	Brett Ratten	Chris Judd		Andrew Carrazzo, Bryce Gibbs, Michael Jamison, Marc Murphy, Jordan Russell, Kade Simpson, Jarrad Waite
Collingwood	Nathan Buckley	Nick Maxwell	Scott Pendlebury	Luke Ball, Travis Cloke, Harry O'Brien, Heath Shaw, Dale Thomas
Essendon	James Hird	Jobe Watson		Mark McVeigh (vc), Heath Hocking, Michael Hurley, Brent Stanton, David Zaharakis
Fremantle	Ross Lyon	Matthew Pavlich		Hayden Ballantyne, Matt de Boer, David Mundy, Luke McPharlin, Aaron Sandilands
Gold Coast	Guy McKenna	Gary Ablett	Nathan Bock	Karmichael Hunt, Andrew McQualter, Michael Rischitelli, Zac Smith, David Swallow
Greater Western Sydney	Kevin Sheedy	Phil Davis, Luke Power, Callan Ward		Dean Brogan, Chad Cornes, Setanta Ó hAilpín, Rhys Palmer, Tom Scully
Geelong	Chris Scott	Joel Selwood	Jimmy Bartel	Joel Corey, Corey Enright, Steve Johnson, James Kelly, Harry Taylor
Hawthorn	Alastair Clarkson	Luke Hodge	Jordan Lewis, Jarryd Roughead	Lance Franklin, Sam Mitchell
Melbourne	Mark Neeld	Jack Grimes, Jack Trengove		Clint Bartram, Mitch Clark, James Frawley, Colin Garland, Mark Jamar, Nathan Jones
North Melbourne	Brad Scott	Andrew Swallow	Drew Petrie, Jack Ziebell	Brent Harvey, Daniel Wells
Port Adelaide	Matthew Primus (Rds 1–19); Garry Hocking (Rds 19–23)	Domenic Cassisi		Travis Boak, Hamish Hartlett, Jay Schulz, Jackson Trengove
Richmond	Damien Hardwick	Chris Newman	Trent Cotchin	Brett Deledio, Daniel Jackson, Jack Riewoldt
St Kilda	Scott Watters	Nick Riewoldt		Nick Dal Santo, Sam Fisher, Brendon Goddard, James Gwilt, Ben McEvoy, Leigh Montagna, Adam Schneider
Sydney	John Longmire	Adam Goodes, Jarrad McVeigh		Jude Bolton, Kieren Jack, Jarred Moore, Ryan O'Keefe, Ted Richards, Rhyce Shaw, Nick Smith
West Coast	John Worsfold	Darren Glass	Beau Waters	Dean Cox, Andrew Embley, Shannon Hurn, Josh Kennedy, Mark LeCras, Matt Priddis, Matt Rosa, Adam Selwood, Scott Selwood
Western Bulldogs	Brendan McCartney	Matthew Boyd		Daniel Cross, Daniel Giansiracusa, Robert Murphy, Dale Morris

== Club membership ==
2012 AFL membership figures
Club	Members	Change from 2011	% change from 2011
Adelaide	45,105	▼1,415	▼3.04%
Brisbane Lions	20,762	▼1,576	▼7.06%
Carlton	45,800	▲2,009	▲4.59%
Collingwood	72,688	▲892	▲1.24%
Essendon	47,708	▼2,567	▼5.11%
Fremantle	42,918	▼1,057	▼2.40%
Geelong	40,205	▲779	▲1.98%
Gold Coast	11,204	▼2,855	▼20.31%
Greater Western Sydney	10,241	—N/a	—N/a
Hawthorn	60,841	▲4,488	▲7.96%
Melbourne	35,459	▼1,478	▼4.00%
North Melbourne	33,423	▲3,509	▲11.73%
Port Adelaide	35,543	▼1,081	▼2.95%
Richmond	53,027	▲5,372	▲11.27%
St Kilda	35,440	▼3,836	▼9.77%
Sydney	29,873	▲2,767	▲9.78%
West Coast	57,377	▲3,337	▲6.18%
Western Bulldogs	30,007	▼2,019	▼6.30%
Total	707,621	▲7,937	▲1.13%

== Coach changes ==
Coach	Club	Date	Notes	Caretaker	New coach
Matthew Primus	Port Adelaide	6 August 2012	Sacked following the round 19 loss to Greater Western Sydney.	Garry Hocking	Ken Hinkley
Brett Ratten	Carlton	30 August 2012	Sacked following Carlton's elimination from finals contention in round 22, effective at the end of the season.	N/A	Mick Malthouse
