= Ray Ball (footballer) =

Australian rules footballer

Personal information
- Full name: Ray Ball
- Born: 20 February 1949 (age 77)
- Original team: St Patrick's College
- Height: 185 cm (6 ft 1 in)
- Weight: 86 kg (190 lb)

Playing career^{1}
Years	Club	Games (Goals)
1969–1970	Richmond	12 (0)
1971–1974	South Melbourne	43 (0)
Total		55 (0)
- ^{1} Playing statistics correct to the end of 1974.

Ray Ball (born 20 February 1949) is a former Australian rules footballer who played with Richmond and South Melbourne in the Victorian Football League (VFL).

Ball was a fullback, who came to Richmond from Ballarat and made six appearances early in the 1969 VFL season. He didn't play again for the rest of the year and missed out on participating in Richmond's premiership team. After playing only six more games in 1970, Ball crossed to South Melbourne but struggled with injury in his first season with the club. He was a regular fixture in the South Melbourne side in 1972 and 1973, playing 16 games in each season.

Once his time at South Melbourne had come to an end, Ball continued his football career in the Victorian Football Association, where he played for Caulfield. Later, in 1979, he coached Mulgrave to an Eastern Districts Football League premiership. Ball then joined the coaching staff at Carlton and was put in charge of their Under-19s team in 1981. He also served as an assistant coach with the Sydney Swans.

Two sons, Luke and Matthew Ball, both played in the Australian Football League.
