= Matthew Ball (footballer) =

Australian rules footballer

Personal information
- Full name: Matthew Ball
- Born: 21 February 1982 (age 44)
- Original team: Box Hill (VFL)
- Draft: 51st, 2003 AFL draft
- Height: 183 cm (6 ft 0 in)
- Weight: 83 kg (183 lb)

Playing career^{1}
Years	Club	Games (Goals)
2004–2006	Hawthorn	17 (2)
- ^{1} Playing statistics correct to the end of 2006.

Matthew Ball (born 21 February 1982) is an Australian rules footballer who played with Hawthorn in the Australian Football League (AFL).

Ball is the elder brother of Collingwood premiership player Luke Ball and the son of former VFL footballer Ray Ball.

An Ashburton junior, he was picked up by Hawthorn in the 2000 rookie draft but would be delisted without playing a senior game. After winning the best and fairest award at Box Hill in 2003, he was given a second chance by Hawthorn when they selected him at pick 51 in the end of year national draft. Ball played 13 AFL games in the 2004 season, averaging 12 disposals. For the next two seasons he was only able make another four appearances and spent most of his time with Box Hill, where he won another "best and fairest" in 2006. He finished his league career with 17 games, from which he experienced just one win.

He has since played in the Victorian Amateur Football Association and captained Old Xaverians to a premiership in 2010.
