= List of Old Xaverians =

There are many notable former students—known as "Old Xaverians" (Old Xavs)—and members of the "Old Xaverians' Association" ("OXA") of the Roman Catholic school Xavier College in Kew, Victoria, Australia. Most entries here have been sourced to the official announcement of the Old Xaverians' Association "Roll of Men of Achievement" announced at the 71st Annual Old Xaverians' Dinner held at Xavier College on 21 March 1997.

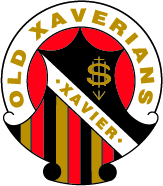
Old Xaverians Association crest

== Arts, academia, entertainment and media ==
- Xavier Bacash – half of Gypsy and the Cat
- Philip Brady OAM – TV and radio personality
- Michael Chamberlin – stand-up comedian; TV personality
- Santo Cilauro – comedian; cast member of The Panel
- Raphael Love – poet, author and award-winning singer-songwriter
- Charlie Clausen – actor and comedian
- Colin Colahan – painter and sculptor; an Australian official war artist in 1942
- Timothy Conigrave – actor, memoirist, author of Holding the Man
- Peter Dahlsen – actor; now a barrister
- Greg Dening – emeritus professor of history, University of Melbourne; author of the official history of Xavier College and the OXA
- Desmond Fennessy – journalist and magazine editor
- Paul Fitzgerald AM – world-renowned artist; founding president of the Realist Artists Guild of Australia; artist of official portrait of Queen Elizabeth II
- Ben Gannon AO – film, theatre, and TV producer
- Simon Gleeson – theatre actor based in London
- Tom Gleisner AO – comedian; The Panel cast member
- Michael Gracey – director of The Greatest Showman and Better Man
- Jack O'Hagan OBE – musician and poet; wrote the songs "Along the Road to Gundagai" (1922) and "Our Don Bradman" (1930)
- Gerard Henderson – syndicated newspaper columnist and former adviser to prime minister John Howard
- Peter Landy – Seven Network sports commentator
- Lawrence Leung – comedian, star of Lawrence Leung's Choose Your Own Adventure
- Dan Lonergan – ABC radio sports commentator
- Philip Martin – poet
- Sam McClure – AFL journalist
- James Massola – south-east Asia correspondent, previously chief political correspondent, The Sydney Morning Herald and The Age
- Matthew Newton – actor (Underbelly, Thank God You're Here); Logie nominee
- Gerald O'Collins SJ, AC – theologian
- Brian O'Shaughnessy – philosopher based in London
- Peter O'Shaughnessy OAM – actor, author, folklorist based in the UK
- Boyd Oxlade – author of Death in Brunswick
- Alex Rathgeber – stage actor and singer
- John Roskam – senior fellow (and former executive director) of the Institute of Public Affairs
- Jock Serong – author
- Grant Smillie – one half of TV Rock
- Lionel Towers – half of Gypsy and the Cat
- James Morgan Walsh – author of 94 novels
- Mike Walsh AM, OBE – TV personality, entrepreneur, and philanthropist
- Matt Walters – musician
- Carl Winter – art historian and museum curator

== Business ==
- Lt Sir Reginald Robert Barnewall Bt 13th Baronet Barnewall – aviator
- Andrew Dillon – CEO designate of the AFL (since 2023)
- James P. Gorman AO (XC 1970–76) – banker, Executive Chairman and former CEO of Morgan Stanley
- Jiro Muramats (XC 1895–97) – pearler and storekeeper from Cossack, Western Australia
- Lloyd J. Williams – property developer and entrepreneur

== Catholic bishops ==
- Denis Hart – Archbishop of Melbourne (2001–2018)
- Romuald Denis Hayes SSC – Bishop of Rockhampton (1932–1945)

== Law ==
=== High Court of Australia ===
- Simon Steward AC – Judge of the High Court of Australia (since 2020)

=== Supreme Court of Papua New Guinea ===
- Sir Colman Michael O'Loghlen Bt (XC 1931), 6th Baronet O'Loghlen – acting Judge of the Supreme Court of Papua New Guinea, inaugural judge of the National Court of Papua New Guinea

=== Australian state Supreme Courts ===
- Sir Kevin Victor Anderson KC – Judge of the Supreme Court of Victoria (1969–1984)
- David Byrne KC – Judge of the Supreme Court of Victoria (1991–2010), Deputy Chief Justice (2001–2010)
- William Cox AC, RFD, KC, ED (XC 1948–53) – Chief Justice of the Supreme Court of Tasmania, Governor of Tasmania (2004–2008)
- Philip Cummins AM, KC – Judge of the Supreme Court of Victoria (1988–2009), Chairperson of the Victorian Law Reform Commission (2012–2019)
- Sir Charles Duffy CMG – Judge of the Supreme Court of Victoria (1933–1961)
- Jack Forrest – Judge of the Trial Division of the Supreme Court of Victoria (2007–2018)
- Terry Forrest KC – Judge of the Court of Appeal of the Supreme Court of Victoria (since 2018)
- Tim Ginnane – Justice of the Supreme Court of Victoria (2013–2023)
- Sir James Gobbo AC, KC, CVO (XC 1944–48) – Governor of Victoria (1997-2000), Justice of the Supreme Court of Victoria (1978-1994) and recipient of the Xaverian Award in 2012
- Sir John Lavan – Judge of the Supreme Court of Western Australia (1969–1981)
- Kevin Lyons KC – Judge of Trial Division (2018–2023) and then the Court of Appeal of the Supreme Court of Victoria (since 2023)
- Sir Murray McInerney KC – Judge of the Supreme Court of Victoria (1965–1983)
- Richard Niall KC – (XC 1984) Chief Justice of the Supreme Court of Victoria (since 2025) and Solicitor-General of Victoria (2015–2017)
- Norman O'Bryan KC – Judge of the Supreme Court of Victoria (1977–1992)
- Peter Riordan KC – Judge of Trial Division of the Supreme Court of Victoria (since 2015)
- Rear Admiral Jack Rush AO, RFD, KC – Judge of the Supreme Court of Victoria (2013–2016), Judge Advocate General of the Australian Defence Force (since 2021)
- Simon Whelan KC (XC 1967–1971) – Judge of the Supreme Court of Victoria (2004–2020)

=== Senior courts ===
- Xavier Connor AO KC (1926–34) – Judge of the Supreme Court of the Australian Capital Territory; the Federal Court of Australia; Chairman of the Victorian Bar
- Hubert Frederico KC – Judge of the Family Court of Australia (1976–2003)
- Geoffrey Giudice AO – President of the Australian Industrial Relations Commission (1997-2009), Judge of the Federal Court of Australia (1997-2012), President of Fair Work Australia (2009-2012)
- Simon Williams – Senior Deputy President of the Australian Industrial Relations Commission
- Anthony Howard AM, KC – Judge of the County Court of Victoria (2006–2016)
- Michael O’Bryan – Judge of the Federal Court of Australia (since 2019)
- John Walters KC – Judge of the Family Court of Australia

== Medicine and the sciences ==
- John Billings AM, KC*SG (XC 1931–35) – neurologist and expert in reproductive fertility who pioneered the Billings ovulation method
- Anthony J. Costello FRACS, – urologist specialising in prostate cancer
- Clyde Fenton OBE – doctor-pilot in the Royal Flying Doctor Service during World War II
- Sir Edmund Britten Jones – Rhodes Scholar and a leading physician in Adelaide
- Daniel James Mahony – geologist and petrologist
- Sir Peter Morris AC (XC 1947–52) – Professor of Surgery at the University of Oxford; President of the Royal College of Surgeons of England (2001–2004)
- Bernard O'Brien CMG, AC – microsurgeon
- Hugh Wirth – veterinarian and animal welfare advocate

== Military and defence ==
- Lieutenant General Sir Thomas Daly KBE CB DSO – Chief of the General Staff (1966–1971)
- Lieutenant General John Frewen AO, DSC – senior officer in the Australian Army; Chief of Joint Capabilities (2021-2024)
- Lieutenant Raymond John Paul Parer AFC – aviation pioneer; first single-engined flight from England to Australia
- Lieutenant-Commander Michael Parker CVO AM – Naval officer and former private secretary to the Duke of Edinburgh (1947–1957)

== Politics and public service ==
=== Vice-regal ===
- Sir Bede Clifford GCMG, CB, MVO (XC 1902–1907) – Governor of The Bahamas (1932–1934), Governor of Mauritius (1937–1942) and Governor of Trinidad and Tobago (1942–1947)
- Christopher Muttukumaru CB, DL (XC 1968) – Deputy lieutenant of Greater London (2017–present)
- Sir Michael O'Loghlen Bt (XC 1883) – 4th Baronet O'Loghlen – Lord Lieutenant of County Clare (1910–1922)

=== Australian federal parliament ===
- Cornelius Ahern – MP for Indi (1913–1914)
- Richard Alston AO (XC 1947–59) – Minister for Communications (1996–2003), Victorian Senator (1986–2004); Australian High Commissioner to the United Kingdom (2005–2008), Federal President of Liberal Party (2014–2017)
- Tim Fischer AC (XC 1958–63) – Deputy Prime Minister of Australia (1996–1999), Leader of the National Party (1990–1999), MP for Farrer (1984–2001); Australian Ambassador to the Holy See (2008–2012)
- Edward Jolley – MP for Grampians (1914–1915)
- Sir Phillip Lynch KCMG (XC 1950–51) – Treasurer of Australia (1975–1977); Deputy Liberal Party Leader (1972–1982); Privy Councillor (1977); Minister for Industry and Commerce (1977-1982); MP for Flinders (1966–1982)
- Julian McGauran – National Senator for Victoria (1987–1990; 1993–2006), Liberal Senator for Victoria (2006–2011)
- Peter McGauran – Minister for Science and Technology (1996-1997), MP for Gippsland (1983–2008)
- Arthur Rodgers (XC 1890) – Minister for Trade and Customs (1921–1923), MP for Wannon (1913–1922, 1925–1929)
- Bill Shorten – Leader of the Opposition and Australian Labor Party Leader (2013–2019), MP for Maribyrnong (2007–2025)
- Dan Tehan – Minister for Education (2018–2020), Minister for Trade (2020–2022), MP for Wannon (since 2010)
- Tom Tehan – Senator for Victoria (1975–1978)

=== Australian state and territory parliaments ===
- John Bennett – Tasmanian State MP for Denison (1986–1990), Attorney-General of Tasmania (1986–1989)
- Harold Cohen CMG, CBE, DSO, VD (Xavier Captain 1898) – Solicitor-General of Victoria (1935), Victorian State MP for Caulfield (1935–1943), MLC for Melbourne South (1929–1935)
- Edward Connellan AO, CBE – MLC (appointed) for the Northern Territory (1955–1967), pioneer of aviation, founder of Connair
- Leo Connellan AM – President of Balranald Shire Council (1959-1975), NSW State MLC (1969–1981)
- Robin Cooper – Victorian State MP for Mornington (1985–2006), Minister for Transport (1997–1999)
- John Cornwall OAM (XC 1951) – South Australian State MLC (1975–1989), Minister for Health and Community Services (1985–1988), Minister for Health (1982–1985), Minister for Environment and Lands (1979), MLC (1975–1988)
- Luke Donnellan (XC 1984) – Victorian State MP for Narre Warren North (2002–2022), Minister in Andrews' ministries (2014–2021)
- Julian Doyle – Victorian State MP for Gisborne (1967 to 1971)
- Michael Gidley – Victorian State MP for Mount Waverley (2010–2018)
- Matthew Groom – Tasmanian State MP for Denison (2010–2018), Minister for Environment and Energy (2014–2017)
- Rob Hulls AM (XC 1968–74) – Deputy Premier of Victoria (2007–2010), Attorney-General of Victoria (1999–2010), Victorian State MP for Niddrie (1996–2012)
- Pat Kennelly AO – Minister in Cain's first and second ministries; Victorian MLC for Melbourne West (1932–1952); Victorian Senator (1953–1971)
- Brendan Lyons – Tasmanian State MP for Bass (1982–1986), Minister for Housing (1984–1986)
- Kevin Lyons KC – Tasmanian State MP for Darwin/Braddon (1948-1972), Deputy Premier of Tasmania (1969–1972), Speaker of the Tasmanian House of Assembly (1956–1959)
- Pat McNamara AM (XC 1957–68) – Deputy Premier of Victoria (1992–1999), Victorian State MP for Benella (1982–2000)
- Charles Murphy – Victorian State MP for Hawthorn (1952–1955)
- David O'Brien (XC 1985–88) – Victorian MLC for Western Victoria (2010–2014)
- Thomas Ryan KC (XC 1890) – Premier of Queensland (1915–1919), MP for West Sydney (1919–1921)

=== UK Parliament (House of Lords) ===
- Lord (Lewis) Clifford (XC 1905), 12th Baron Clifford of Chudleigh, British hereditary peer; patron of the Victorian scouting movement; donated "Yarra Brae", now Clifford Park Wonga Park, to the Scouts

=== Public service ===
- Philip Alston AO – United Nations Special Rapporteur on extrajudicial, summary or arbitrary executions (2004–2010); UN Special Rapporteur on extreme poverty and human rights (2014-2020); professor of law at New York University
- George Brouwer – Victorian Ombudsman (2004-2014)
- Sir Francis Raymond Connelly – Lord Mayor of Melbourne (1945–1948)

== Sport ==
Cricket

- Leslie "Chuck" Fleetwood-Smith – test cricketer for Victoria and the national team
- Percy McDonnell – cricketer for Victoria, New South Wales and Queensland
- Jonathan Merlo – cricketer for Australia U19s, Cricket Australia XI, Stars, Victoria and Renegades
- Leo O'Brien (XC 1914-19) – Test cricketer for Australia (1932–1936)
- Tom O'Donnell – cricketer for Victoria
- Joseph Plant – first-class cricketer for Victoria and Australian rules footballer for Richmond
- Karl Schneider – first-class cricketer for Victoria
- Peter Williams – first-class cricketer for Victoria

Four Old Xaverians, Leslie "Chuck" Fleetwood-Smith, Leo O'Brien, Stuart King and Joe Plant, represented Victoria v South Australia in a Sheffield Shield match at the Melbourne Cricket Ground in February 1933.

Football

- Marcus Allan (XC 2004) – AFL footballer for Brisbane Lions
- Patrick Ambrose (XC 2009) – AFL footballer for Essendon
- Doug Bailey – AFL footballer for St Kilda
- John Baird (XC 1998) – AFL footballer for North Melbourne
- Luke Ball (XC 2002) – AFL footballer for St Kilda and Collingwood
- Matthew Ball (XC 1999) – AFL footballer for Hawthorn
- Caydn Beetham (XC 1999) – AFL footballer for St Kilda
- Dom Berry – AFL footballer for Hawthorn
- David Bourke (XC 1993) – AFL footballer for Richmond and North Melbourne
- Matthew Bourke – AFL footballer for Hawthorn and Fitzroy
- Paul Briglia – VFL footballer for South Melbourne
- Alex Browne (XC 2010) – AFL footballer for Essendon
- Brian Brushfield – VFL footballer for Geelong and later football commentator
- Cyril Burke – VFL footballer for Richmond
- Noel Burrows – VFL footballer for Collingwood
- Bill Cosgrove – VFL footballer for Richmond
- Peter Curtain – VFL footballer for St Kilda
- Peter Czerkaski – VFL footballer for Richmond
- Sean Darcy (XC 2016) – AFL footballer for Fremantle
- Alwyn Davey Jr. (XC 2022) – AFL footballer for Essendon
- James Davies (XC 2000) – AFL footballer for Essendon
- Daniel Donati – AFL for Richmond
- Frank Donnellan – VFL footballer for Hawthorn, North Melbourne and Fitzroy
- Jack Drake – VFL footballer for Hawthorn
- Zak Evans – AFL footballer for Gold Coast; previously cricketer for Australia U19s, Renegades and Victorian Men's
- Tim Fleming (XC 1996) – AFL footballer for Richmond
- Sean Godsell – VFL player for St Kilda
- Tim Golds (XC 2011) – AFL footballer for GWS Giants and Collingwood
- Andrew Gowers – AFL footballer for Hawthorn and Brisbane Bears and Lions
- Billy Gowers (XC 2014) – AFL footballer for Footscray
- Trevor Gowers – VFL footballer for Richmond
- Michael Green – VFL footballer for Richmond
- Geoff Greetham – VFL footballer for St Kilda
- Dan Hannebery (XC 2009) – AFL footballer for Sydney Swans and St Kilda
- Matt Hannebery – VFL footballer for Footscray
- Max Heath (XC 2021) – AFL footballer for St Kilda
- Daniel Howe (XC 2013) – AFL footballer for Hawthorn
- Cameron Hunter (XC 2002) – AFL footballer for Melbourne Demons
- Changkuoth Jiath (XC 2017) – AFL footballer for Hawthorn
- Tew Jiath – AFL footballer for Collingwood
- Alex Johnson (XC 2009) – AFL footballer for Sydney Swans
- Joe Kelly (XC 1917-25) – VFL footballer for Carlton
- Josh Kennedy (XC 2006) – AFL footballer for Hawthorn and Sydney Swans
- Stuart King – VFL footballer for St Kilda and cricketer for Victoria
- Andrew Leoncelli (XC 1992) – AFL footballer for Melbourne Demons
- Finlay Macrae (XC 2020) – AFL footballer for Collingwood
- John Mahon – VFL player for Collingwood
- Des Meagher – VFL footballer for Hawthorn
- Jack Moriarty – VFL footballer for Fitzroy
- James Morrissey – AFL footballer for Hawthorn
- Pat Morrissey – VFL footballer for University
- Cameron O'Brien – VFL footballer for Collingwood and Brisbane Bears
- Pat O'Dea – VFL and American football player and coach; US college football Hall of Fame inductee (1962)
- Chris O'Sullivan – VFL/AFL footballer for Brisbane Bears
- Finn O'Sullivan (XC 2024) – AFL footballer for North Melbourne
- Luke O'Sullivan – VFL/AFL footballer for Carlton
- Stephen Pirrie – VFL player for Richmond, St Kilda and Essendon
- Marc Pittonet (XC 2014) – AFL footballer for Hawthorn
- Leo Rankin – VFL footballer for Melbourne
- Ted Richards (XC 2000) – AFL footballer for Essendon, Sydney Swans
- Xavier Richards (XC 2011) – AFL footballer for Sydney Swans
- Willie Rioli (XC 2013) – AFL footballer for West Coast Eagles and Port Adelaide
- Austin Robertson Sr. – VFL footballer for South Melbourne, West Perth and Perth; world champion professional sprinter (1930)
- Daniel Robinson (XC 2012) – AFL footballer for Sydney Swans
- Percy Rodriguez – VFL footballer for University and Melbourne; killed in action during the Battle of the Somme
- Phil Ryan AM – VFL footballer for Hawthorn; Hawthorn FC president (1968-1979)
- Ted Ryan – VFA and VFL footballer for Williamstown and Collingwood
- Gerald Rush (OX 1912) – VFL footballer for Richmond
- Kevin Rush (OX 1918) – VFL footballer for Richmond
- Vin Sabbatucci – VFL footballer for St Kilda
- Andrew Schauble (XC 1994) – AFL footballer for Collingwood and Sydney Swans
- Casey Sibosado (XC 2008) – AFL footballer for Fremantle
- Jack Silvagni (XC 2015) – AFL footballer for Carlton
- Sam Shaw (XC 2009) – AFL footballer for Adelaide
- Brian Sierakowski – VFL footballer for St Kilda and Subiaco
- Bailey Smith (XC 2018) – AFL footballer for Footscray
- Matthew Spangher (XC 2004) – AFL footballer for West Coast Eagles, Sydney Swans, Hawthorn
- Des Steele – VFL footballer for Collingwood
- Paul Sullivan – VFL footballer for Hawthorn
- Mark Summers – VFL footballer for Richmond
- Robbie Tarrant (XC 2006) – AFL footballer for North Melbourne and Richmond
- Paul Tuddenham – VFL/AFL footballer for Collingwood
- Laitham Vandermeer (XC 2017) – AFL footballer for Footscray
- Vigo Visentini (XC 2023) – AFL footballer for Essendon
- Tex Wanganeen (XC 2021) – AFL footballer for Essendon
- Jobe Watson (XC 2002) – AFL footballer for Essendon
- Chris Wittman – VFL/AFL footballer for Hawthorn and St Kilda

The 2012 AFL season was a successful year for Old Xaverians as Ted Richards, Josh Kennedy, Dan Hannebery and Alex Johnson were all in the Swans premiership team, and Watson, Richards and Kennedy were all selected in the All-Australian side. In the 2013 AFL season, Ted Richards, Josh Kennedy, Dan Hannebery, Alex Johnson, Daniel Robinson, and Xavier Richards were all listed on the Sydney Swans playing list, holding the record for the most Old Xavierians at one AFL club.

Racing

- Will Davison – racing driver for Dick Johnson Racing; two-time Bathurst 1000 winner
- Paul Dumbrell – racind driver for Eggleston Motorsport and Triple Eight Race Engineering; one-time Bathurst 1000 winner
- Alan Jones OBE – Formula One world champion (1980) and broadcaster

Rowing

- Peter Antonie OAM – rower; Olympic and Commonwealth gold medallist and world champion
- Marc Douez – rowing coxswain; national and world champion
- Brian Doyle – Olympic bronze medallist, rowing M8+ (1956)
- David Doyle – Olympian M4 (1984)
- Mark Doyle – Olympian M8+ and World Champion M8+ (1986)
- David England – Olympian M8+ (1980); World Championships LM8+ (1977 and 1979)
- Dick Garrard Jr. – Olympic rower M4 (1964); World Championship bronze medal LM8+ (1977)
- Peter Gillon – Olympian M4+ (1960 and 1964)
- Nick Green OAM – member of the Oarsome Foursome; dual Olympic gold medallist and 4 time World Champion
- Simon Keenan – Olympian (2020) M8+ and World silver medallist M8+ (2018)
- Mike McKay OAM – Member of the Oarsome Foursome; dual Olympic gold medallist and 4 time World Champion
- Martin Tomanovits – Olympic Rower M8+ (1964)

Running

- Robert de Castella AO, MBE – World Marathon Champion 1983, Commonwealth Games gold medallist, multiple Olympian and former marathon world record holder
- Matthew Clarke – Olympic runner
- David McNeill – long-distance runner; Australian representative to the 2012 Olympics in athletics
- Ken Roche AO (OX 1960) – Commonwealth Games 400m hurdles gold medallist

Misc

- Deng Adel – basketball player for the Ottawa BlackJacks
- Wayne Athorne – national decathlon champion and VFL player for Hawthorn
- Alistair Donohoe – cyclist and Paralympian
- Dick Garrard Sr. OBE – Olympic wrestling silver medallist 1948 and 3 time Commonwealth Games Gold medallist
- Matt McCarthy – basketball player
- Jonty O'Callaghan – para-alpine skier
- Paul Trimboli – former Socceroos player
- Tom Warhurst Sr. – tennis player

== See also ==
- List of schools in Victoria
- List of boarding schools
- Associated Public Schools of Victoria
