= Brian O'Shaughnessy =

Brian O'Shaughnessy may refer to:

- Brian O'Shaughnessy (philosopher) (1925–2010), Australian philosopher
- Brian O'Shaughnessy (actor) (1931–2001), South African actor and voiced Jet Jungle
- Brian O'Shaughnessy (producer), London based music producer for Misty's Big Adventure etc.
