= Luke O'Sullivan =

Luke O'Sullivan may refer to:

- Luke O'Sullivan (footballer)
- Luke O'Sullivan (politician)

== See also ==
- Luke Sullivan, Australian artist
