= William Hackett =

William Hackett may refer to:

- William Hackett (VC) (1873–1916), English recipient of the Victoria Cross
- William Hackett (priest) (1878-1954), Irish Jesuit
- William Hackett (mountaineer) (1918–1999), American mountaineer
- Sir William Hackett (judge) (1824-1877), Chief Justice of Fiji and the Chief Justice of Ceylon
- William Stormont Hackett (1868-1926), Mayor of Albany New York

== See also ==
- William Hacket (died 1591), English puritan and religious fanatic
