= Dom Berry =

Australian rules footballer

Personal information
- Born: 13 June 1971 (age 55)
- Original team: Xavier College
- Height: 198 cm (6 ft 6 in)
- Weight: 98 kg (216 lb)

Playing career^{1}
Years	Club	Games (Goals)
1992	Hawthorn	1 (0)
- ^{1} Playing statistics correct to the end of 1992.

Domenic Berry (born 13 June 1971) is a former Australian rules footballer who played with Hawthorn in the Australian Football League (AFL).

Berry, a key forward, spent most of his time at Hawthorn in the reserves competition. The Xavier College recruit appeared in just one senior AFL game, which came in round 14 of the 1992 AFL season, against the West Coast Eagles at Waverley Park. He later played for the Port Melbourne Football Club.
