= Mark Hannebery =

Australian rules footballer

Personal information
- Full name: Mark Hannebery
- Born: 8 October 1957 (age 69)
- Original team: North Melbourne CBC Old Boys
- Height: 179 cm (5 ft 10 in)
- Weight: 77 kg (170 lb)

Playing career^{1}
Years	Club	Games (Goals)
1979–1983	Collingwood	61 (23)
1984	Essendon	1 (0)
Total		62 (23)
- ^{1} Playing statistics correct to the end of 1984.

Mark Hannebery (born 8 October 1957) is a former Australian rules footballer who played with Collingwood and Essendon in the Victorian Football League (VFL).

== Career ==
Hannebery, a left footed half-back flanker and wingman, was recruited from North Melbourne CBC Old Boys. He was part of a strong Collingwood team in his early years, with the club making the grand final in each of his first three seasons. Despite playing 36 games in that period, he never played in a final.

He made a single appearance for Essendon in 1984, which was against his former club.

After his VFL career ended, Hannebery returned to North Melbourne CBC, as captain-coach.

== Personal life ==
Hannebery's brother Matt played for Footscray and his nephew Dan is a Sydney premiership player.
