= Pat Morrissey (Australian footballer) =

Australian rules footballer and pastoralist

Personal information
- Full name: Patrick Joseph Morrissey
- Born: 6 October 1891; Merrigum
- Died: 25 January 1938 (aged 46); Sydney
- Original team: Xavier College

Playing career^{1}
| Years | Club | Games (Goals) |
| 1910 | University | 4 (6) |
- ^{1} Playing statistics correct to the end of 1910.

Patrick Joseph Morrissey (6 October 1891 – 25 January 1938) was an Australian pastoralist and Australian rules footballer who played with University.

The son of Victorian politician, schoolteacher, storekeeper and pastoralist John Morrissey, Morrissey was born in Merrigum, Victoria but moved with his family to New South Wales. He operated pastoral properties in Singleton, Muswellbrook, Blandford and Willow Tree, New South Wales.
