= Joseph Plant =

Australian cricketer (1907–1993)

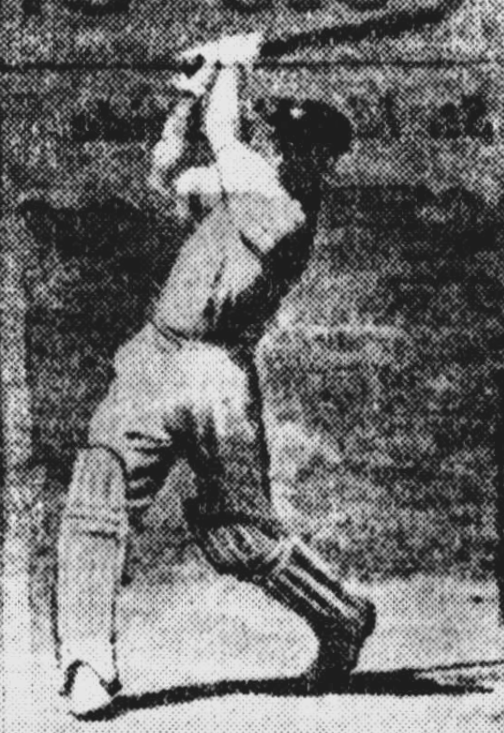
- Plant in 1936

Personal information
- Full name: Hugh Joseph Plant
- Born: 12 October 1907; Narrandera, New South Wales
- Died: 30 August 1993 (aged 85); Geelong, Victoria
- Batting: Left-handed
- Bowling: Right-arm off-break
- Role: All-rounder

Domestic team information
- Years: Team
- 1932–33–1936–37: Victoria

Career statistics
Competition	First-class
Matches	20
Runs scored	659
Batting average	29.95
100s/50s	0/4
Top score	76
Balls bowled	3,115
Wickets	42
Bowling average	29.35
5 wickets in innings	1
10 wickets in match	0
Best bowling	6/43
Catches/stumpings	24/–
- Source: CricketArchive, 10 October 2022

Hugh Joseph Plant (12 October 1907 – 30 August 1993) was an Australian first-class cricketer who represented Victoria in the Sheffield Shield during the 1930s.

Plant was educated at Xavier College who was initially an Australian rules footballer and played a senior match for Victorian Football League club Richmond in the 1925 VFL season. Richmond lost the fixture, which took place at the Melbourne Cricket Ground, to Melbourne by 39 points. He could not break into Richmond's team again and instead continued his football career at Coburg, where he played as a centre half back in their 1928 premiership side. Plant completed his football career in the 1929 season and in 1930 moved to the Fitzroy Baseball Club to begin a distinguished career as a baseballer. One of the leading Fitzroy baseballers at this time was the Test opening batsman, W. H. Ponsford. In his first season playing baseball Plant was mentioned as a valuable player and in 1938 and 1939 he captained the Victorian baseball team for the Claxton shield, the interstate baseball competition.

Plant was a member of the Old Xaverian Cricket Club when it was formed in 1926 and was the leading batsman scoring 621 runs at an average of 62.1. In the next season he departed to play for the Fitzroy First Eleven and the Victorian Colts Eleven. When Plant made his first-class cricket debut in 1932, it was as a specialist off spinner. Playing against Tasmania at Launceston, Plant took career best figures of 6–43 as the island state collapsed from 2 for 128 to 171 all out. He then took perhaps the two biggest scalps of his career, Herbert Sutcliffe and Eddie Paynter, when Victoria played against the touring Marylebone Cricket Club at the MCG the following year.

In February 1933, Plant, along with three fellow alumni of Xavier College, Leslie "Chuck" Fleetwood-Smith, Leo O'Brien & Stuart King represented Victoria vs South Australia in a Sheffield Shield match.

An all-rounder, Plant's batting peaked in the 1935–36 season when he made 395 runs at 39.50, including three of his four first-class half centuries. He put on a couple of notable performances early in the summer, starting with an innings of 64 against the Marylebone Cricket Club, who were touring Australia once more. Aside from reaching his then highest first-class score he also chipped in with a couple of wickets. His other memorable effort came against New South Wales at the MCG, where he scored 76 in his first innings and followed it up by having a hand in six dismissals when it was their opponent's turn to bat, two of them wickets and the other four catches.

In 1936–37, his final season, Plant was a member of Victoria's Sheffield Shield winning team, having taken part in three matches during their campaign. Plant continued as captain and coach at Fitzroy and was a mentor for the young Neil Harvey. After retiring from Fitzroy Plant was appointed coach of South Melbourne and was influential in Ian Redpath's early development as a batsman. He also returned to coach the Xavier College Cricket team during the 1960s.
