= Changkuoth Jiath =

Australian rules footballer (born 1999)

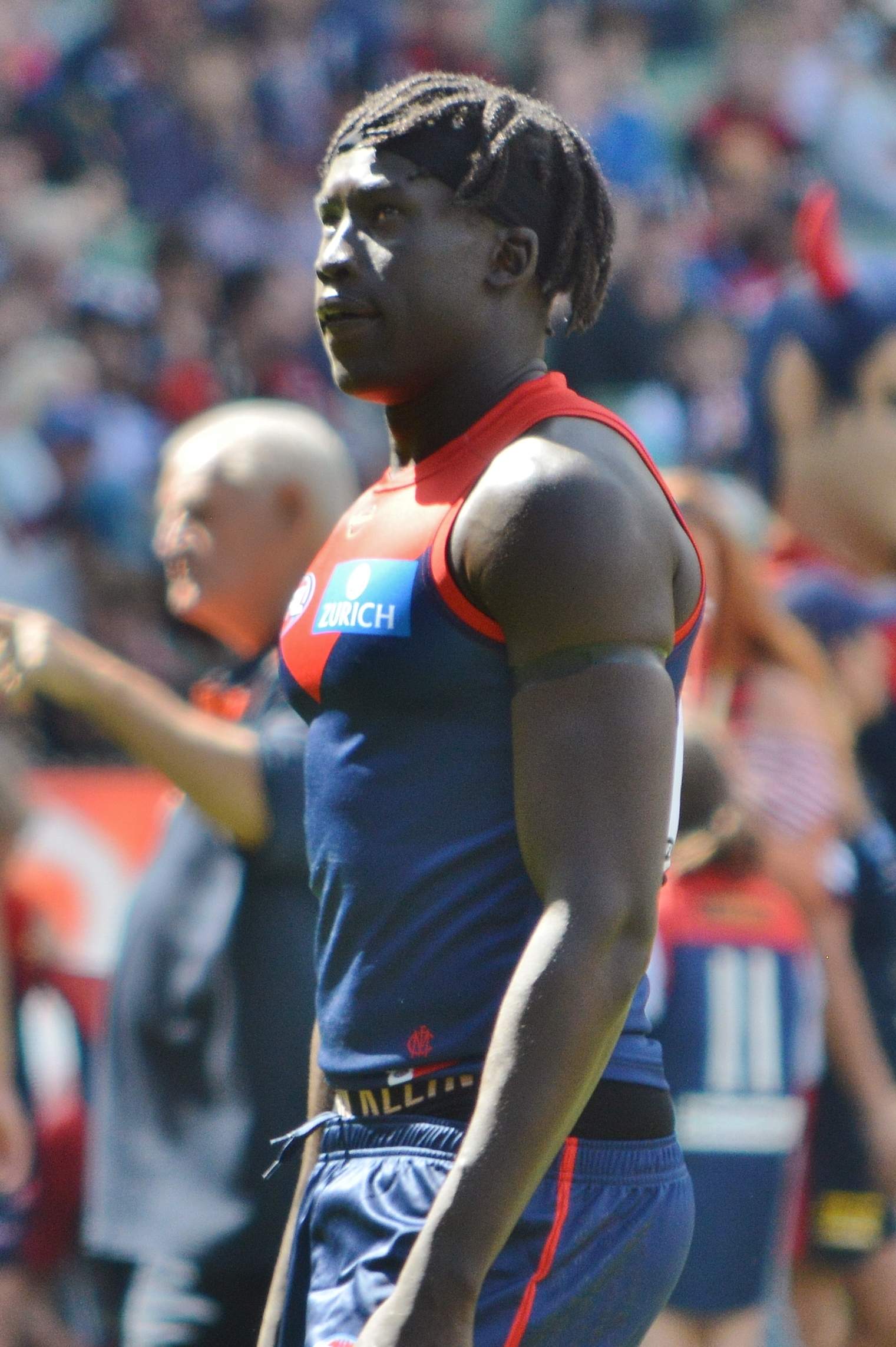
- Jiath playing for Melbourne in March 2026

Personal information
- Full name: Changkuoth Jiath
- Nickname: CJ
- Born: 13 June 1999 (age 27); Mekelle, Ethiopia
- Original team: Gippsland Power (NAB League)/Xavier College (APS)/Morwell Tigers (GL)
- Draft: Category B rookie signing, 2018 rookie draft
- Debut: Round 21, 2019, Hawthorn vs. Greater Western Sydney, at UNSW Canberra Oval
- Height: 185 cm (6 ft 1 in)
- Weight: 78 kg (172 lb)
- Position: Defender

Club information
- Current club: Melbourne
- Number: 14

Playing career^{1}
| Years | Club | Games (Goals) |
| 2018–2025 | Hawthorn | 76 (5) |
| 2026– | Melbourne | 16 (0) |
| Total | | 92 (5) |
- ^{1} Playing statistics correct to the end of 2026.

Career highlights
- 22under22 team: 2021; VFL premiership player: 2018

Changkuoth Jiath (/ˈtʃæŋkwɒθ dʒiːˈæθ/ CHANG-kwoth jy-ATH; born 13 June 1999) is an Australian rules footballer who plays for the Melbourne Football Club in the Australian Football League (AFL).

== Early life ==
Born in Ethiopia to South Sudanese parents, Jiath moved to Australia when he was six years old. Living in the town of Morwell he played his junior football at the Morwell Youth Club. Changkuoth then went on to play senior football at the Morwell Tigers Football Club. Because his name was hard for others to pronounce, Jiath adopted the nickname "CJ" to make it easier for people to address him. He completed high school while boarding at Xavier College in Melbourne. During his time at Xavier, he forged close friendships with future AFL players Laitham Vandermeer and Bailey Smith.

== AFL career ==
=== Hawthorn (2018–2025) ===
Jiath was selected as a 2017 category B rookie. He had a delayed start to the 2018 season when he suffered a groin injury during the pre-season. Jiath made his debut for Box Hill, Hawthorn's VFL affiliate, mid-year and he showed good signs on the half back line. Jiath made his debut for Hawthorn in the snow for their round 21, 2019 game against Greater Western Sydney. He ended up playing 2 games during the 2019 season. In the middle of the 2020 season, Jiath was upgraded to the senior list following changes to the rookie promotion rules.

The 2021 season ended up being a breakout year for Jiath as he grew with skill and confidence. Nearly averaging 20+ disposals for all 16 games he played in. Jiath's season was cut short due to a PCL injury which ruled him out for the remainder of the season.

=== Melbourne (2026–present) ===
Jiath was traded to Melbourne following the 2025 AFL season.

== Family ==
Jiath's younger brother Tew debuted for Collingwood in 2024.

== Statistics ==
Updated to the end of round 22, 2026.

Legend
| G | Goals | K | Kicks | D | Disposals | T | Tackles |
| B | Behinds | H | Handballs | M | Marks |

| Season | Team | No. | Games | Totals | | | | | | | Averages (per game) | | | | | | | Votes |
| Season | Team | No. | Games | G | B | K | H | D | M | T | G | B | K | H | D | M | T | Votes |
|---|---|---|---|---|---|---|---|---|---|---|---|---|---|---|---|---|---|---|
| 2018 | Hawthorn | 43 | 0 | — | — | — | — | — | — | — | — | — | — | — | — | — | — | 0 |
| 2019 | Hawthorn | 29 | 2 | 0 | 0 | 10 | 19 | 29 | 7 | 5 | 0.0 | 0.0 | 5.0 | 9.5 | 14.5 | 3.5 | 2.5 | 0 |
| 2020 (Note: The 2020 season was played with 17 home-and-away matches per team (down from 22) and 16-minute quarters with time on (down from 20-minute quarters with time on) due to the impact of the COVID-19 pandemic.) | Hawthorn | 29 | 5 | 0 | 0 | 27 | 21 | 48 | 13 | 8 | 0.0 | 0.0 | 5.4 | 4.2 | 9.6 | 2.6 | 1.6 | 0 |
| 2021 | Hawthorn | 29 | 16 | 0 | 2 | 172 | 152 | 324 | 93 | 26 | 0.0 | 0.1 | 10.8 | 9.5 | 20.3 | 5.8 | 1.6 | 2 |
| 2022 | Hawthorn | 9 | 14 | 1 | 2 | 141 | 113 | 254 | 63 | 29 | 0.1 | 0.1 | 10.1 | 8.1 | 18.1 | 4.5 | 2.1 | 6 |
| 2023 | Hawthorn | 9 | 8 | 1 | 0 | 77 | 59 | 136 | 28 | 10 | 0.1 | 0.0 | 9.6 | 7.4 | 17.0 | 3.5 | 1.3 | 0 |
| 2024 | Hawthorn | 9 | 11 | 3 | 4 | 76 | 55 | 131 | 33 | 22 | 0.3 | 0.4 | 6.9 | 5.0 | 11.9 | 3.0 | 2.0 | 0 |
| 2025 | Hawthorn | 9 | 20 | 0 | 3 | 153 | 123 | 276 | 54 | 32 | 0.0 | 0.2 | 7.7 | 6.2 | 13.8 | 2.7 | 1.6 | 0 |
| 2026 | Melbourne | 14 | 13 | 0 | 0 | 124 | 61 | 185 | 74 | 19 | 0.0 | 0.0 | 9.5 | 4.7 | 14.2 | 5.7 | 1.5 | 0 |
| Career | | | 89 | 5 | 11 | 780 | 603 | 1383 | 365 | 151 | 0.1 | 0.1 | 8.8 | 6.8 | 15.5 | 4.1 | 1.7 | 8 |

== Honours and achievements ==
Team

- McClelland Trophy (Hawthorn): 2024
- VFL premiership player (Box Hill): 2018

Individual

- 22under22 team: 2021
