= Wayne Athorne =

Australian decathlete and Australian rules footballer (1941–1992)

- Born: Wayne John Athorne; 7 September 1941; East Melbourne, Victoria
- Died: 4 April 1992 (aged 50); Armadale, Victoria
- Known for: Decathlon; Australian rules football

Wayne John Athorne (7 September 1941 – 4 April 1992) was a national decathlon champion and Commonwealth Games competitor. He was also an Australian rules footballer with Hawthorn in the Victorian Football League (VFL).

Athorne played his early football at Xavier College and trialled at Melbourne before making his VFL debut for Hawthorn in a win over Carlton at Glenferrie Oval in the 1961 season. Hawthorn went on to win their first ever premiership that season. The following year he left football to pursue his love of athletics.

As a decathlon athlete, Athorne finished second to John O'Neill in the 1965 Australian Open Track & Field Championships. He won the decathlon in 1966 at Perry Lakes Stadium in Perth by beating South Australian John Hamann with 30 points.

Having become the Australian champion, Athorne competed in the 1966 British Empire and Commonwealth Games held in Jamaica. He finished fifth in the 120 yards hurdles in 15.34 seconds. In the decathlon he accumulated 710 points before an injury to his right knee sustained during the long jump. The injury forced him to withdraw. The injury meant he was unable to take up a scholarship to University of California, Santa Barbara, which he was offered.

In 1975, Athorne confessed to taking performance-enhancing drugs for the three months leading up to the 1966 Commonwealth Games. He took Dianabol, an anabolic steroid, which was banned by the International Olympic Committee in 1967.
