= Matt Hannebery =

Australian rules footballer

Personal information
- Full name: Matthew Hannebery
- Born: 16 October 1964 (age 62)
- Original team: Old Xaverians
- Height: 183 cm (6 ft 0 in)
- Weight: 83 kg (183 lb)

Playing career^{1}
Years	Club	Games (Goals)
1986–1990	Footscray	32 (4)
- ^{1} Playing statistics correct to the end of 1990.

Matthew "Matt" Hannebery (born 16 October 1964) is a former Australian rules footballer who played with Footscray in the Victorian Football League (VFL).

== Career ==
Recruited from Old Xaverians, Hannebery started at Footscray in 1986 and played 32 league games for the club in five seasons.

Most of his appearances came in 1988 (10) and 1989 (13).

Hannebery was appointed captain of Old Xaverians in 1992, then coached the club in 1993 and 1994, when they finished third both seasons. He was captain again in 1995 and led them to a premiership that year, which was secured with a 15.11 (101) to 2.5 (17) grand final win over the University Blues. In 1996 he continued as captain and Old Xaverians claimed another premiership, defeating Collegians by five points in the grand final.

== Family ==
His brother, Mark Hannebery, played for Collingwood and Essendon.

Brother-in-law, Luke O'Sullivan, was a Carlton player.

Dan Hannebery, Matt's son, is currently at the St Kilda football club and formerly of the Sydney Swans and was a member of their 2012 premiership team.
