= 1933–34 Sheffield Shield season =

Australian cricket tournament

- Cricket format: First-class
- Tournament format: Double round-robin
- Champions: Victoria (14th title)
- Participants: 4
- Matches: 12
- Most runs: Don Bradman (New South Wales) (922)
- Most wickets: Chuck Fleetwood-Smith (Victoria) (39) & Clarrie Grimmett (South Australia) (39)

The 1933–34 Sheffield Shield season was the 38th season of the Sheffield Shield, the domestic first-class cricket competition of Australia. Victoria won the championship.

== Table ==
Team	Played	Won	1st Inns Won	1st Inns Lost	Lost	Drawn	Points
Victoria	6	3	1	1	0	0	20
New South Wales	6	3	1	1	1	0	19
South Australia	6	2	0	0	4	0	10
Queensland	6	1	1	0	4	0	8

== Statistics ==
=== Most Runs ===
Don Bradman 922

=== Most Wickets ===
Chuck Fleetwood-Smith 39 & Clarrie Grimmett 39
