= Greg Growden =

Australian sports journalist (died 2020)

Greg Growden (1959/1960 – 14 November 2020) was an Australian sports journalist, author and biographer.

== Life ==
Growden was born in Adelaide, the son of Port Adelaide Football Club player Kevin Growden. The family moved to a rice farm at Coleambally in the Riverina where Growden spent his teenage years.

He joined the Sydney Morning Herald in early 1978 soon after leaving school. He was chief rugby union correspondent for the paper from 1987 to 2012, and was the Australian rugby union correspondent for ESPN from 2012 to 2018. He is one of just two international rugby writers to cover all of the first eight World Cups.

Growden died of cancer on 14 November 2020, aged 60.

== Books ==
- The Wallabies' World Cup! (1991, with Spiro Zavos, Simon Poidevin and Evan Whitton)
- A Wayward Genius: The Fleetwood-Smith Story (1991)
- With the Wallabies (1995)
- Gold, Mud and Guts: The Incredible Tom Richards – Footballer, War Hero, Olympian (2001)
- Rugby Union for Dummies (2003, 2011)
- The Snowy Baker Story (2003)
- My Sporting Hero (2004, editor)
- It's Not Just a Bloody Game! Timeless Rugby Union Stories (2007)
- Jack Fingleton: The Man Who Stood Up to Bradman (2008)
- Inside the Wallabies: The Real Story – the Players, the Politics, the Games from 1908 to Today (2010)
- More Important than Life or Death: Inside the Best of Australian Sport (2013, co-editor with Peter FitzSimons)
- Wallaby Warrior: The World War I War Diaries of Tom Richards, Australia's only British Lion (2013, editor)
- Bowled by a Bullet: The Tragic Life of Claude Tozer (2015)
- The Wrong 'Un: The Brad Hogg Story (2016, with Brad Hogg)
- The Wallabies at War (2018)
- Major Thomas: The Bush Lawyer Who Defended Breaker Morant and Took On the British Empire (2019)
- Cricketers at War (2019)
