= Billy Gowers =

Australian rules footballer (born 1996)

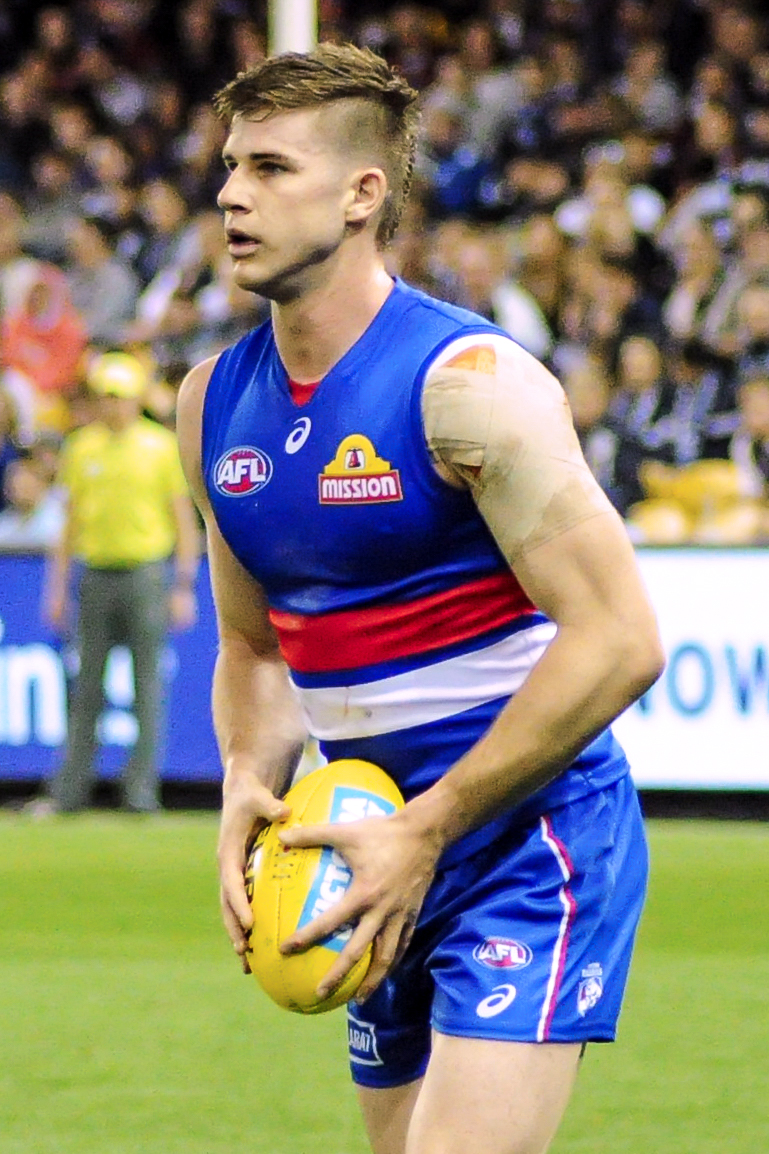
- Gowers in 2018

No. 19 – Indiana Hoosiers
- Position: Punter
- Class: Sophomore

Personal information
- Born: 10 June 1996 (age 30); Brisbane, Queensland, Australia
- Listed height: 6 ft 2 in (1.88 m)
- Listed weight: 205 lb (93 kg)

Career information
- High school: Xavier College (Melbourne, Victoria, Australia)
- College: Hawaii (2025); Indiana (2026–present)
- Stats at ESPN

Other information
Australian rules football career
Personal information
- Original teams: Footscray (VFL), Oakleigh Chargers (NAB League), Xavier College
- Draft: No. 6, 2015 rookie draft No. 9, 2018 rookie draft
- Debut: Round 1, 2018, Greater Western Sydney vs. Western Bulldogs, at UNSW Canberra Oval
- Height: 187 cm (6 ft 2 in)
- Weight: 87 kg (192 lb)
- Position: Forward
Playing career^{1}
Years	Club	Games (Goals)
2015–2016	Carlton	0 (0)
2018–2020	Western Bulldogs	33 (39)
- ^{1} Playing statistics correct to the end of 2020.
Career highlights
- Western Bulldogs leading goalkicker: 2018; Jim 'Frosty' Miller Medal: 2024

Billy Gowers (born 10 June 1996) is a former Australian rules footballer who currently plays American football for the Indiana Hoosiers. He previously played professionally for the Western Bulldogs in the Australian Football League (AFL), and played for the Hawaii Rainbow Warriors before transferring to Indiana.

== Early career ==
Gowers was born in Brisbane and moved to Melbourne at an early age. Having played football at his school, Xavier College and Oakleigh Chargers, he was drafted by the Carlton Football Club with their first selection and fifth overall in the 2015 rookie draft. He spent two years on Carlton's list before he was delisted at the end of the 2016 season without playing a senior AFL match. He spent the 2017 season playing with Footscray in the Victorian Football League (VFL) before he was drafted by the Western Bulldogs with their first selection and ninth overall in the 2018 rookie draft.

== AFL ==
In his debut AFL year, Gowers was the leading goal kicker for the Western Bulldogs, kicking 26 goals in 20 games. He made his debut in the 82-point loss to Greater Western Sydney at UNSW Canberra Oval in the opening round of the 2018 season. He is the son of 1991 Hawthorn premiership player, Andrew Gowers. Gowers was delisted by the Bulldogs at the conclusion of the 2020 AFL season after playing 33 games over his three seasons with the club.

== VAFA and VFL ==
After playing two seasons with the Southport Sharks in the VFL, Gowers returned to Old Xaverians in the Victorian Amateur Football Association (VAFA) for the 2023 season, the same club his grandfather Trevor and father Andrew both played.

He then played for Port Melbourne Football Club during the 2024 VFL season and kicked 50 goals, winning the Jim 'Frosty' Miller Medal.

== American football ==
Gowers joined ProKick Australia in late 2024, and in 2025 joined the Hawaii Rainbow Warriors as a punter. Gowers made his debut for Hawaii against Stanford on 23 August. He made a 67-yard punt in the first quarter.

On December 25, Gowers confirmed he had entered the transfer portal with three years of eligibility remaining. On January 11, 2026, he announced he had committed to the Indiana Hoosiers.

== See also ==
- Australians in American football
