= Andy Gowers =

Australian rules footballer (born 1969)

President of the Hawthorn Football Club
- Incumbent
- Assumed office 13 December 2022
- Preceded by: Jeff Kennett

Personal details
- Born: Andrew Gowers; 11 April 1969 (age 57)
Australian rules football career
Personal information
- Original team: Xavier College
- Debut: 22 May 1988, Hawthorn vs. West Coast, at Subiaco Oval
- Height: 191 cm (6 ft 3 in)
- Weight: 85 kg (187 lb)
Playing career
Years	Club	Games (Goals)
1988–1994	Hawthorn	89 (54)
1995–1996	Brisbane Bears	40 (7)
1997–1999	Brisbane Lions	11 (2)
Total		140 (61)
Career highlights
- AFL premiership player: 1991

Andrew Gowers (born 11 April 1969) is an Australian rules football administrator and former player who has served as the president of the Hawthorn Football Club since December 2022. He previously played for Hawthorn, the Brisbane Bears and the Brisbane Lions in the Australian Football League (AFL) between 1988 and 1999.

== Playing career ==
A former Xavier College student, he was part of their 1st XVIII in 1986 that won both the Associated Public Schools premiership, as well as the coveted Herald Shield Cup.

== Administrative career ==
On 16 December 2013, Gowers, was appointed to the Hawthorn Football Club board. He will take on the role of Football Director.

Gowers was elected as the president of the Hawthorn Football Club by its members on 13 December 2022, succeeding Jeff Kennett.

== Family ==
Andrew's son Billy Gowers played 33 games for the Western Bulldogs between 2018 and 2020. Andrew's father Trevor Gowers played 24 games for Richmond between 1964 and 1966.
