= William Hackett (priest) =

Irish priest (1878 - 1954)

The Reverend William Hackett SJ (2 May 1878 – 9 July 1954) was an Irish priest, noted for his involvement in nationalist politics in Ireland, and in the educational and intellectual life of Melbourne as Rector of Xavier College and the founder of the city's Central Catholic Library.

== Biography ==
William Philip Hackett was born 2 May 1878, one of nine children of Kilkenny physician John Byrne Hackett and Bridget Doheney. Educated at Clongowes, Hackett entered the Society of Jesus in 1895, being ordained priest in June 1912.

During his years teaching at Clongowes, Milltown Park and in Limerick, he got to know many figures involved in nationalist politics, such as Robert Barton and Erskine Childers, and appears to have provided them and others with some assistance following the Easter Rising in 1916 and during the Irish Civil War. Not long after the death of Michael Collins in 1922 he was posted to Australia, probably for his own safety.

After a short stint teaching in Sydney, Hackett moved to Melbourne where he soon became the confidant of Archbishop Daniel Mannix. Appointed to the Richmond Parish, he also founded the Central Catholic Library in the city centre. The Library served a vital role in the intellectual life of Melbourne's Catholics, particularly in the development of the Campion Society and Catholic Action.

Hackett served as Rector at Xavier College from 1935-1940, where his tenure was not uncontroversial due to clashes with alumni and his style of financial management.

Following his removal from Xavier College, Hackett focused his energies on his true love – the Catholic Library, as well as trying to navigate the increasingly muddy waters of Australian Catholic politics in the lead up to the split of the Australian Labor Party.

William Hackett died on 9 July 1954 as a result of injuries sustained when knocked down by a taxi.

== Bibliography ==
- Hackett, William (February 1912). "From the summit of Seahan : a mid-December idyl". Irish Monthly. 40: 98–99.
- — (March 1912). "From Glendubh to Glencullen : a summer idyl". Irish Monthly. 40: 162–165.
- — (July 1913). "An historic Dublin stream". Irish Monthly. 41: 389–392.
- — (July 1913). "Rambles on the Dublin hills". Irish Monthly. 41: 608–611.
- — (May 1914). "A study in brown". Irish Monthly. 42: 274–281.
- — (1921). Character and citizenship. Series C. Social Problems. Limerick: Cumánn Léigheachtaí an Phobail.
- — (1925). St Peter Canisius. No. 448. Melbourne: Australian Catholic Truth Society.
- — (1936). Prelude to Catholic Action. No. 78, Campion Pamphlet No. 1. Melbourne: Australian Catholic Truth Society.
- — (March 1947). "What is an adequate library?". Twentieth Century (Melbourne). 1 (3): 58–67.
- — (15 September 1949). "What is the Central Catholic Library?". Advocate (Melbourne): 9.
- — (29 September 1949). "What authors think of our Catholic Library". Advocate (Melbourne): 13.
- — (24 November 1949). "A foundation for our Central Catholic Library". Advocate (Melbourne): 9.
