= Peter Williams (Australian cricketer) =

Australian cricketer (born 1942)

Personal information
- Full name: Peter David Williams
- Born: 2 February 1942 (age 84); Brighton, Victoria, Australia
- Batting: Right-handed
- Role: Occasional wicket-keeper

Domestic team information
- Years: Team
- 1965/66: Victoria

Career statistics
Competition	FC
Matches	4
Runs scored	135
Batting average	22.50
100s/50s	0/1
Top score	63
Catches/stumpings	3/1
- Source: ESPNcricinfo, 4 December 2015

Peter David Williams (born 9 February 1942) is an Australian former cricketer. A right-handed batsman and an occasional wicket-keeper, he played four first-class cricket matches for Victoria between 1965 and 1966.

== See also ==
- List of Victoria first-class cricketers
