= Trevor Gowers =

Australian rules footballer (1945–1996)

Personal information
- Full name: Trevor Gowers
- Born: 26 April 1945
- Died: 9 June 1996 (aged 51)
- Original team: Xavier College
- Height: 180 cm (5 ft 11 in)
- Weight: 80 kg (176 lb)
- Position: Wing

Playing career^{1}
Years	Club	Games (Goals)
1964–66	Richmond	24 (5)
- ^{1} Playing statistics correct to the end of 1966.

Trevor Gowers (26 April 1945 – 9 June 1996) was a former Australian rules footballer who played with Richmond in the Victorian Football League (VFL).

== Family ==
Trevor's son Andrew Gowers played 140 games for Hawthorn and Brisbane Lions between 1986 and 1999. Trevor's grandson Billy Gowers played 33 games for the Western Bulldogs between 2018 and 2020.
