= Peter Czerkaski =

Australian rules footballer

Personal information
- Full name: Peter Czerkaski
- Born: 19 September 1964 (age 62)
- Original team: De La Salle
- Height: 185 cm (6 ft 1 in)
- Weight: 80 kg (176 lb)

Playing career^{1}
Years	Club	Games (Goals)
1985–1990	Richmond	46 (6)
- ^{1} Playing statistics correct to the end of 1990.

Peter Czerkaski (born 19 September 1964) is a former Australian rules footballer who played with Richmond in the Victorian Football League (VFL).

== Career ==
Czerkaski, a defender and tagger, came to league football from De La Salle. He played 46 games for Richmond, from 1985 to 1990. Three of his six career goals came in the opening round of the 1987 VFL season, a high scoring loss to the West Coast Eagles, which were making their debut in the competition. He was involved in an incident against Hawthorn in 1989, when he was knocked down by Gary Buckenara behind play and was carried off the field with concussion. The Hawthorn player received a three-week suspension.

In the early 1990s, Czerkaski played for Sandringham in the Victorian Football Association (VFA). He was a full-back in Sandringham's 1992 premiership team and on a half back flank when they were premiers again in 1994. It was on a half back flank that Czerkaski was named in Sandringham's Team of the Century.
