= Peter Riordan =

Peter Riordan is an Australian barrister and judge who was appointed to the Supreme Court of Victoria in 2015. He was the principal judge of the Commercial Court. He retired from the Supreme Court in 2022.

Riordan was born in Shepparton and was admitted to the legal profession in 1976, before being appointed Queen's Counsel in 2003. He served as Chairman of the Victorian Bar Council from 2007 to 2008, and also served as of 2008 as its senior vice president. He was President of the Australian Bar Association from 2010 to 2011.

Riordan wrote the 2019 court opinion refusing to block the Australian Labour Party's expulsion of trade unionist John Setka.
