= Geoff Greetham =

Australian rules footballer

Personal information
- Full name: Geoff Greetham
- Born: 5 June 1962 (age 64)
- Original team: Xavier College
- Height: 188 cm (6 ft 2 in)
- Weight: 77 kg (170 lb)

Playing career^{1}
Years	Club	Games (Goals)
1980	St Kilda	3 (1)
- ^{1} Playing statistics correct to the end of 1980.

Geoff Greetham (born 5 June 1962) is a former Australian rules footballer who played with St Kilda in the Victorian Football League (VFL).
