= Tew Jiath =

Australian rules footballer

Personal information
- Full name: Tew Gatthep Jiath
- Nickname: TJ
- Born: 2 March 2005 (age 21); Mekelle, Ethiopia
- Original teams: Gippsland Power, (Talent League)
- Draft: No. 37, 2023 national draft
- Debut: 16 June 2024, Collingwood vs. North Melbourne, at Marvel Stadium
- Height: 188 cm (6 ft 2 in)
- Weight: 72 kg (159 lb)
- Position: Defender

Club information
- Current club: Collingwood
- Number: 19

Playing career^{1}
Years	Club	Games (Goals)
2024–	Collingwood	1 (0)
- ^{1} Playing statistics correct to the end of the 2025 season.

Tew Gatthep Jiath (born 2 March 2005) is a professional Australian rules footballer playing for the Collingwood Football Club in the Australian Football League.

== Early life ==
Born in a refugee camp in Ethiopia to South Sudanese parents, Jiath, along with his family, moved to Australia in 2007 when he was just 2 years old.

At under-19 Australian rules football level, Jiath played for the Gippsland Power as a medium defender.

== Club career ==
Jiath was drafted by Collingwood in the 2023 national draft at pick number 37 as Collingwood's second pick of the night, following Harry DeMattia's selection. Jiath was drafted just months after Collingwood had won the premiership.

Jiath made his AFL debut in round 14, 2024. He played a pivotal role in Collingwood's defeat of North Melbourne at Docklands Stadium, when the Magpies trailed by 54 points and won by 1 point to record their largest comeback from deficit since 1970.

== Personal life ==
Jiath grew up supporting Collingwood, stating that his favourite player was Scott Pendlebury.

He is also the younger brother of Changkuoth Jiath who currently plays for Melbourne in the AFL.

== Statistics ==
Updated to the end of the 2025 season.

Legend
G	Goals	K	Kicks	D	Disposals	T	Tackles
B	Behinds	H	Handballs	M	Marks

Season	Team	No.	Games	Totals							Averages (per game)							Votes
Season	Team	No.	Games	G	B	K	H	D	M	T	G	B	K	H	D	M	T	Votes
2024	Collingwood	19	1	0	0	4	1	5	2	3	0.0	0.0	4.0	1.0	5.0	2.0	3.0	0
2025	Collingwood	19	0	—	—	—	—	—	—	—	—	—	—	—	—	—	—	0
Career			1	0	0	4	1	5	2	3	0.0	0.0	4.0	1.0	5.0	2.0	3.0	0
