= Peter Dahlsen =

Australian actor (born 1951)

- Born: Peter John Morgan Dahlsen; 23 February 1951 (age 74); Sydney, New South Wales, Australia
- Education: Xavier College; National Institute of Dramatic Art
- Occupations: Actor, barrister
- Spouse: Jennifer Boost (m. 1986)

Peter Dahlsen (born 23 February 1951) is an Australian actor turned barrister. In that country, he was known for appearing in soap operas: as Richie Bates in Bellbird (including being in the 1000th episode) during the 1970s and as Bill Ashley in Sons and Daughters during the 1980s.

== Early life ==
A one-time accountant, Dahlsen worked in Adelaide with a repertory company. At the age of 19, he won a NIDA scholarship before moving to Melbourne in 1973.

== Acting ==
His acting work in both Australia and the United Kingdom consists of Matlock Police, Division 4, Homicide, Secret Army, Bergerac, Doctor Who's Time-Flight, Shackleton (playing photographer Frank Hurley), Special Squad, Bodyline (as cricketer Les Ames) and London's Burning.

== Law ==
In 1995, Dahlsen was awarded the David Karmel entrance award at Gray's Inn. Called to the bar the following year, he has since worked as a defence and prosecuting barrister.

Over time, his cases have involved drink-driving, assault, child abuse, kidnapping and sexual violence, brawling, murder, possession of weapons with intent, arson and threatening behaviour.

Dahlsen has occasionally taught law at the University of Law. In addition, he spent a month working in the Attorney-General's office at the Supreme Court of St Helena over 2017/2018.
