= Karl Schneider (cricketer) =

Australian cricketer

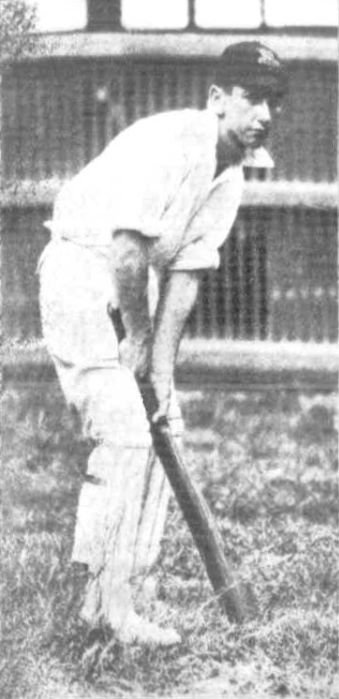

Personal information
- Full name: Karl Joseph Schneider
- Born: 15 August 1905; Hawthorn, Victoria
- Died: 5 September 1928 (aged 23); Kensington Park, South Australia
- Height: 1.57 m (5 ft 2 in)
- Batting: Left-handed
- Bowling: Leg spin
- Role: Batsman

Domestic team information
- Years: Team
- 1922/23-1924/25: Victoria
- 1926/27-1927/28: South Australia
- First-class debut: 2 February 1923 Victoria v Tasmania
- Last First-class: 3 April 1928 Australia v New Zealand

Career statistics
Competition	First-class
Matches	20
Runs scored	1,509
Batting average	48.67
100s/50s	6/8
Top score	146
Balls bowled	533
Wickets	10
Bowling average	35.50
5 wickets in innings	–
10 wickets in match	–
Best bowling	2/10
Catches/stumpings	5/–
- Source: CricketArchive, 25 January 2009

Karl Joseph Schneider (15 August 1905 – 5 September 1928) was a cricketer who played for Victoria and South Australia.

== Cricket career ==
Only 157 cm tall, Schneider was born in the Melbourne suburb of Hawthorn and was a left-handed batsman who occasionally bowled right-arm wrist spin. Schneider showed precocious talent as a schoolboy player and was selected for his first-class debut as a 17-year-old while attending Xavier College, Melbourne. Batting at number eight, he contributed 55 runs to Victoria's (then) world record total of 1059, against Tasmania. Despite this promising start, Schneider had to wait two years for another opportunity and he eventually relocated to Adelaide in 1926 when it became obvious that he was not going to get a regular place in the strong Victorian batting line-up. Schneider was also a noted footballer and he joined the Norwood Football Club on his move to Adelaide.

In 1926–27, his first season with South Australia, Schneider hit 605 runs at an average of 50.41 to help the team win the Sheffield Shield. He then scored another 520 runs (at 52.00) the following season to earn selection for the Australian team that toured New Zealand in the autumn of 1928. He had a successful tour (averaging 46.85) and appeared likely to break into the Test team in the coming years. However, he collapsed while horse riding during the latter stages of the New Zealand tour, the first signs of the illness that took his life later in the year. He died of leukaemia, before the next cricket season commenced, at Kensington Park, South Australia, only three weeks after his 23rd birthday.

Schneider played 20 first-class matches, scoring 1509 runs (at 48.67) and taking 10 wickets (at 35.50). He made six centuries, the highest of which was 146 for South Australia against New South Wales at the Sydney Cricket Ground in January 1927. For the Australian touring team against Canterbury in March 1928 he made 138, and he and Bert Oldfield added 229 for the seventh wicket in a little under two hours.

Schneider holds the runs record for the Xavier College First XI. During his four seasons in the firsts (1921, 1922, 1923, 1924) he made 1642 runs including seven centuries. He captained the team in 1922, 1923 and 1924 and won premierships in 1923 and 1924. Schneider also holds the wickets record for the Xavier First XI, having taken 139 wickets.

== See also ==
- List of Victoria first-class cricketers
