= Laitham Vandermeer =

Australian football league player

Personal information
- Born: 3 February 1999 (age 27)
- Original team: Murray Bushrangers (TAC Cup)/Mooroopna Football Club
- Draft: No. 37, 2018 AFL draft, Western Bulldogs
- Debut: 14 June 2020, Western Bulldogs vs. St Kilda, at Marvel Stadium
- Height: 180 cm (5 ft 11 in)
- Weight: 77 kg (170 lb)
- Position: Utility

Club information
- Current club: Western Bulldogs
- Number: 23

Playing career^{1}
Years	Club	Games (Goals)
2019–	Western Bulldogs	89 (45)
- ^{1} Playing statistics correct to the end of round 22, 2026.

Career highlights
- Chris Grant Best First Year Player (2020)

Laitham Vandermeer (born 3 February 1999) is an Australian rules footballer, who plays for the Western Bulldogs in the Australian Football League (AFL). He was recruited by the Western Bulldogs with the 37th draft pick in the 2018 AFL draft.

== Early Football ==
Vandermeer participated in the Auskick program at Mooroopna, Victoria

Vandermeer played for the Murray Bushrangers for 3 seasons and Vic Country in the AFL Under 18 Championships for 1 season. Prior he played with Mooroopna Football Club and his school side at Xavier College, with future teammate Bailey Smith.

== AFL career ==
=== 2020 season: Debut ===
Vandermeer played 15 games for the Bulldogs' Victorian Football League (VFL) side in 2019, before breaking into the Australian Football League (AFL) team in 2020. Vandermeer debuted in the Bulldogs' loss to the St Kilda Saints in the second round of the 2020 AFL season. Vandermeer kicked his first goal on his debut, as well as collecting 10 disposals, 3 marks and 2 tackles. Vandermeer suffered a hamstring injury in the Bulldogs' 11 point loss to the Geelong Football Club in the 14th round of the 2020 AFL season, and was ruled out for the rest of the home and away season. Vandermeer won the Western Bulldogs Chris Grant Best First Year Player award, after playing 12 games in the 2020 AFL season and kicking 9 goals.

=== 2021 season ===
Vandermeer started out the season strongly, kicking 2 goals and collecting 14 disposals in the Western Bulldogs' opening round win over Collingwood.

== Honours & Achievements ==
- Chris Grant Best First Year Player: 2020

== Statistics ==
Updated to the end of round 22, 2026.

Legend
G	Goals	K	Kicks	D	Disposals	T	Tackles
B	Behinds	H	Handballs	M	Marks

Season	Team	No.	Games	Totals							Averages (per game)							Votes
Season	Team	No.	Games	G	B	K	H	D	M	T	G	B	K	H	D	M	T	Votes
2019	Western Bulldogs	23	0	—	—	—	—	—	—	—	—	—	—	—	—	—	—	0
2020 (Note: The 2020 season was played with 17 home-and-away matches per team (down from 22) and 16-minute quarters with time on (down from 20-minute quarters with time on) due to the impact of the COVID-19 pandemic.)	Western Bulldogs	23	12	9	9	72	45	117	31	25	0.8	0.8	6.0	3.8	9.8	2.6	2.1	0
2021	Western Bulldogs	23	11	6	8	46	50	96	24	26	0.5	0.7	4.2	4.5	8.7	2.2	2.4	0
2022	Western Bulldogs	23	10	4	3	57	55	112	26	18	0.4	0.3	5.7	5.5	11.2	2.6	1.8	0
2023	Western Bulldogs	23	11	2	4	87	60	147	30	28	0.2	0.4	7.9	5.5	13.4	2.7	2.5	0
2024	Western Bulldogs	23	24	10	8	138	99	237	83	45	0.4	0.3	5.8	4.1	9.9	3.5	1.9	0
2025	Western Bulldogs	23	19	13	7	100	97	197	55	32	0.7	0.4	5.3	5.1	10.4	2.9	1.7	0
2026	Western Bulldogs	23	2	1	2	12	12	24	5	1	0.5	1.0	6.0	6.0	12.0	2.5	0.5	0
Career			89	45	41	512	418	930	254	175	0.5	0.5	5.8	4.7	10.4	2.9	2.0	0
