= Luke O'Sullivan (footballer) =

Australian rules footballer

Personal information
- Full name: Luke O'Sullivan
- Born: 28 March 1968 (age 58)
- Original teams: Xavier College, Kew
- Height: 177 cm (5 ft 10 in)
- Weight: 92 kg (203 lb)

Playing career^{1}
Years	Club	Games (Goals)
1988–1997	Carlton	62 (58)
- ^{1} Playing statistics correct to the end of 1997.

Luke O'Sullivan (born 28 March 1968) is a former Australian rules footballer who played with Carlton in the Victorian/Australian Football League (VFL/AFL).

Nicknamed Rhino, O'Sullivan played mostly as a half forward and made his league debut in 1988 after serving his apprenticeship in the Under-19s.

O'Sullivan, who came originally from Xavier College in Kew, had an injury plagued career but put in some good performances in 1992 to kick 21 goals. He missed the entire 1993 AFL season due to a knee injury, sustained when some turf controversially gave way at Waverley Park. The following year he made just two appearances, one of which was a semi final and played six times in Carlton's 1995 premiership winning season. After playing just once in 1996, O'Sullivan put together a career best 15 games in 1997 despite missing four games for breaking the jaw of Adelaide's Trent Ormond-Allen.
