= Brian O'Shaughnessy (philosopher) =

Australian philosopher and writer (1925–2010)

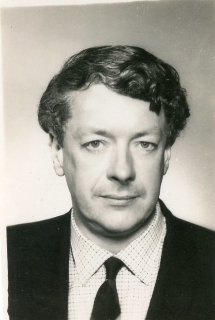
- Born: Brian Joseph O'Shaughnessy; 10 September 1925; Kew, Victoria, Australia
- Died: 7 July 2010 (aged 84); London, England
- Occupation: Philosopher
- Known for: Dual-aspect theory of the will

Brian Joseph O'Shaughnessy ((/oʊˈʃɔːnəsi/; 10 September 1925 – 7 July 2010) was an Australian philosopher of mind, who lived in London and taught at King's College London. He published papers on the nature of physical action and the will.

== Biography ==
He was born in Kew, a suburb of Melbourne in Australia, where his father was a doctor. He studied at Xavier College and then attended Melbourne University, firstly studying engineering before changing to philosophy. He graduated in 1950 and then went to England to continue his studies at Oxford University. He is buried in Highgate Cemetery in north London in the first section on the right immediately upon entering the Eastern Cemetery. His wife Edna O'Shaughnessy was buried with him in 2022.

== Major works ==
- The Will: A Dual Aspect Theory (Cambridge University Press, 1980) ISBN 0-521-22680-5
- Consciousness and the World (Oxford University Press, 2000)
