= Xavier College =

Roman catholic school in Melbourne, Australia

Location
- Kew, Melbourne, Victoria; Australia; 37°48′44″S 145°1′54″E

Information
- Type: Independent, Roman Catholic day and boarding
- Motto: Latin: Sursum Corda (Lift up your hearts)
- Religious affiliation: Roman Catholic
- Established: 1878; 148 years ago
- Founders: Society of Jesus
- Chairperson: Kathleen Donnellon
- Rector: Fr. Chris Middleton SJ
- Principal: Lee MacMaster
- Years offered: Preschool–Year 12
- Gender: Co-education (Kindergarten); Boys (Foundation–12)
- Enrolment: 2,085 (as of 2011)
- Campus type: Urban
- Colours: Cardinal , Black
- Affiliations: IPSHA; AHISA; ABSA; APS; JACSA
- Alumni: Old Xaverians
- Website: xavier.vic.edu.au

Xavier College is a Roman Catholic, day and boarding school predominantly for boys, founded in 1872 by the Society of Jesus, with its main campus located in Kew, an inner eastern suburb of Melbourne, Victoria, Australia. Classes started in 1878.

The college is part of the international network of Jesuit schools begun in Messina, Sicily in 1548 and a member of the Jesuit and Companion Schools in Australia. Originally an all-boys school, the college offers a co-education Kindergarten, and an all-boys' environment from Foundation to Year 12. As of 2011, the school had 2,085 students enrolled, including boarding for 76 students.

The school is in the Archdiocese of Melbourne, and is affiliated with the Independent Primary School Heads of Australia (IPSHA) formerly the Junior School Heads Association of Australia (JSHAA), the Association of Heads of Independent Schools of Australia (AHISA), the Australian Boarding Schools' Association (ABSA), and the Associated Public Schools of Victoria (APS).

In December 2010, The Age reported that, on the number of alumni who were appointed as a Companion of the Order of Australia – Australia's highest civilian honour – Xavier College ranked equal tenth among Australian schools. (Note: The hard copy article also published a table of the schools which were ranked in the top ten places: 1st (19 awards) Scotch College, Melbourne; 2nd (17 awards) Geelong Grammar School; 3rd (13 awards) Sydney Boys High School; equal 4th (10 awards each) Fort Street High School, Perth Modern School and St Peter's College, Adelaide; equal 7th (9 awards each) Melbourne Grammar School, North Sydney Boys High School, and The King's School, Parramatta; equal 10th (6 awards each) Launceston Grammar School, Melbourne High School, Wesley College, Melbourne and Xavier College.) In 2012, AFL footballer, Grant Thomas, described the school as "the best-connected school in Melbourne". Its notable alumni included an archbishop, two state governors, a deputy prime minister and a state premier, three deputy premiers, a High Court justice, and numerous Supreme Court justices.

== History ==
What is now called the "Senior Campus" is located on Barkers Road in Kew, eight kilometres (five miles) from the Melbourne city centre. The foundation stone of the campus was laid in 1872 and the school began formally as the St Francis Xavier's College in February 1878 on land known originally as Mornane's Paddock. Construction continued during the school's early years, with the main oval added in 1883, and the West Wing and Great Hall in 1890. In 1900, Xavier replaced St Patrick's College in East Melbourne as the only Catholic institution among the six Associated Public Schools at that time. A memorial chapel on the Senior Campus was constructed in memory of Old Xaverians killed in World War I, that was opened in 1934.

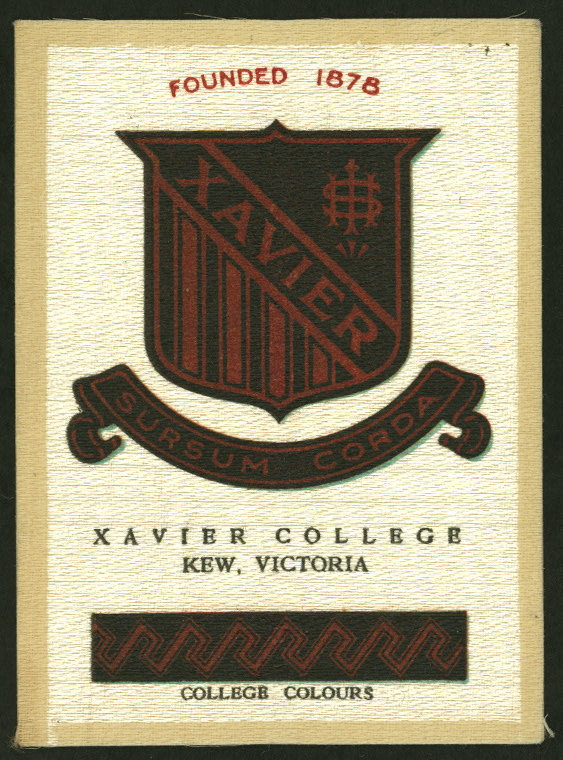
Cigarette card featuring the Xavier College colours and crest, c. 1920s

In 1993, a multi-purpose sports centre, the Stephenson Centre (Note: Subsequently renamed.) was opened. A science facility and the Eldon Hogan Performing Arts Centre was opened in 2008 with eleven science laboratories, a music rehearsal room, and a 500-seat auditorium.

Chris McCabe was the first lay principal of a Jesuit school in Australia, who served from October 1997 until the end of 2008, succeeded by Chris Hayes, the former principal at St Edmund's College in Canberra.

Xavier has a long-standing rivalry with St Kevin's College, in legal circles, an Old Xaverian Supreme Court judge quipped that 'You boys who were taught by the Brothers can never aspire to the Supreme Court. Positions on that Bench are reserved for those of us who were taught by the Jesuits'.

=== Buildings and campuses ===
Xavier College
- The college in the 1950s

History
- Built: c. 1857 (Studley House); 1872–1878 (South Wing); 1889 (West Wing); 1890 (Great Hall); 1934 (Chapel)

Site notes
- Area: 28 ha (70 acres) (1878; Senior campus)
- Architects: William Ellis (1857); Kelly, Dennehy and Tappin (1872–1890); Schrieber and Jorgensen (1934)
- Architectural styles: Victorian Italianate (1857); Victorian (1878); Victorian Free Classical (1889–1890); Edwardian Baroque (1934)

Victorian Heritage Register
- Official name: Xavier College
- Type: Registered Place
- Designated: 2 October 1991
- Reference no.: VHR H0893
- Heritage overlay no.: HO004
- Categories: Education; Religion

Victorian Heritage Register
- Official name: Studley House (Wren House)
- Type: Registered Place
- Designated: 8 August 1990
- Reference no.: VHR H0789
- Heritage overlay no.: HO101
- Category: Residential buildings (private)

Some buildings (Note: Specifically, the South Wing, the West Wing, the Great Hall and the Chapel.) on the Senior Campus were added to the Victorian Heritage Register on 2 October 1991, and Studley House at the Burke Hall Campus was added to the same register on 8 August 1990, each listing was made in recognition of their historic and architectural significance.

Burke Hall

Studley Hall, sometimes referred to as "Studley House", was a former residence of Carl Pinschof, and in 1917, there were multiple media reports that the Roman Catholic Archdiocese of Melbourne had purchased the house for the purposes of establishing a Catholic girls' school at the site. By 1918, the property was purchased by the Victorian Government for the purposes of establishing a venereal hospital. However, in the face of local community opposition to the hospital, the government sold Studley Hall in 1920 to T. M. Burke, a Catholic businessman, who gifted the property to the College.

Studley Hall opened in 1921 as Xavier's first preparatory school. Fr James O'Dwyer SJ, Rector of Xavier between 1908 and 1917, became Burke Hall's first headmaster, before the campus was renamed Burke Hall several years later in honour of its benefactor. Burke donated a classroom block in 1923 and, in 1926, Burke's wife provided funding for a construction of a chapel in memory of her deceased brother. The campus was extended in 1966 with the donation of an adjacent mansion from the estate of John Wren following his death. After renovations to the original ballroom, which in 1975 became the library, and the original hall had been converted to classrooms, a new classroom block was built in 1987. A multi-purpose hall was constructed in 1997 overlooking the main oval that was re-graded in 1998. In 2002, a co-educational Early Years Centre was opened on the Burke Hall campus. The Burke Hall campus also accommodates for students up to Year 4. In 2011, a new classroom block, the St Mary MacKillop Building, was added and named after the first Australian-born saint, Mary MacKillop, as a space for Years 5 and 6 students.

Memorial Chapel

An Edwardian Baroque-style chapel was built in 1928 to celebrate the golden jubilee of Xavier College. From conception to completion, construction took around sixteen years and was led by Rectors Edmund Frost and Frank O’Keefe.

The foundation stone reads:

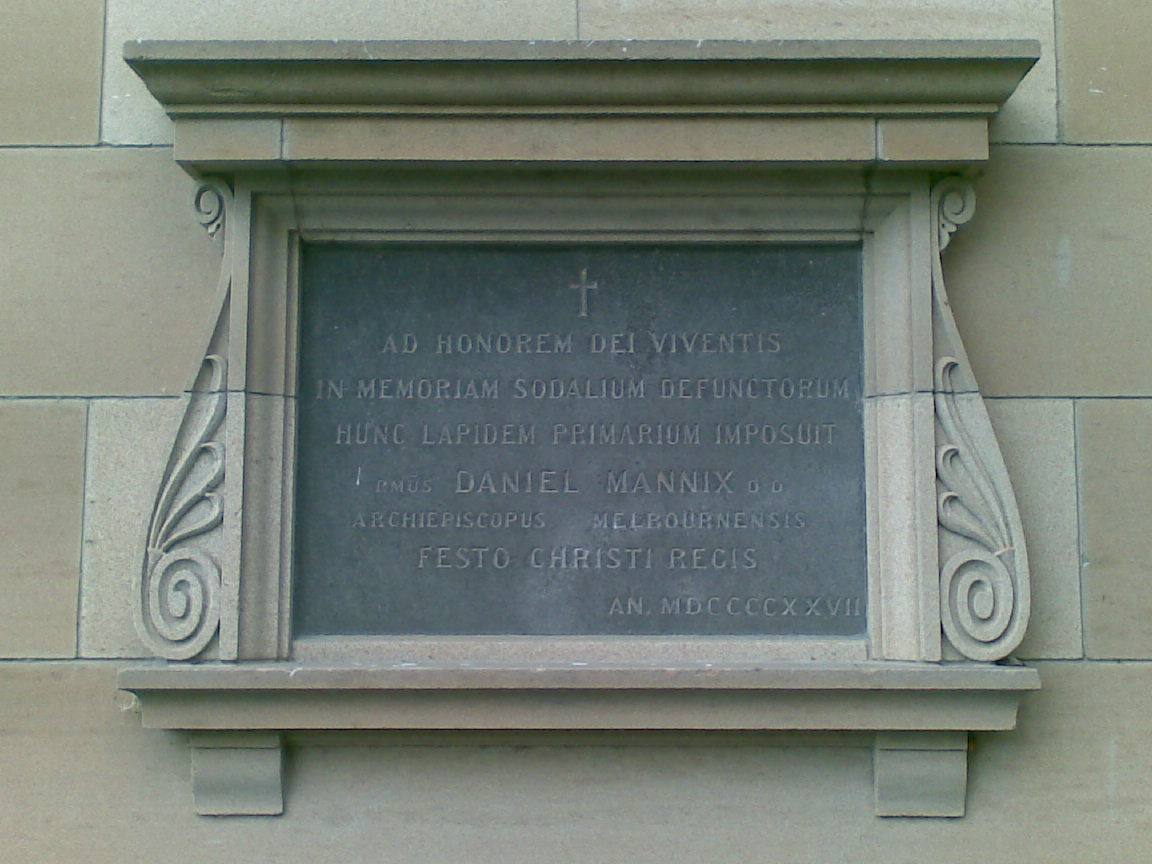
Memorial Chapel foundation stone

AD HONOREM DEI VIVENTIS
IN MEMORIAM SODALIUM DEFUNCTORUM
HUNC LAPIDEM PRIMARIUM IMPOSUIT
RMUS DANIEL MANNIX D.D.
ARCHIEPISCOPUS MELBOURNENSIS
FESTO CHRISTI REGIS
AN. MDCCCCXXVII

In honour of our living God
In memory of our fallen comrades
This foundation stone was laid by
His Grace Daniel Mannix D.D.
Archbishop of Melbourne
on the Feast of Christ the King
In the year 1927

Kostka Hall

Following the request by Daniel Mannix, Archbishop of Melbourne, that the school should have a campus in the southern suburbs of the city, Fr William Hackett SJ, the Rector, opened the Kostka Hall Junior campus in Brighton in 1937 on the water of Brighton beach and near Brighton beach railway station. Classes were from Year 2 to Year 8 and by the end of the first year, the numbers of students had grown to 62, including 16 boarders. The Kostka hall boarding house didn't last long though, with the boarders being moved to Burke Hall in the early 1940's after scares that the Japanese would attack Port Phillip Bay, leaving the students in jeopardy. A second building, Marchwood (also known as St Johns), was demolished in 1959 to make way for a major building project, including classrooms, tuckshop, and administrative buildings, and a chapel was built in 1967. Science rooms were added in 1969, and in the 1970s the Jesuits bought various adjoining properties to expand the campus. In 1996 a multi-purpose hall was completed with a new arts centre opened in 1998. In 2005 an Early Years Centre based on the one at Burke Hall was opened. After rumors of the campus closing for years In 2021, after 85 years, Kostka Hall campus closed its gates for the final time, due to a decline in enrollments and the substantial effect of COVID-19. Moving the students of Kostka Hall to the newly built Manresa campus, a section of the school below the science wing. This was only used for the period of time in-between Kostka Hall's closing and the new joint middle years campus. In 2024 the new building called 'The Kostka Building' was built, behind the chapel oval on the senior campus. Primarily to be used by Years 7 and 8 students, who in 2024 transitioned from Burke Hall and Manresa to the Senior school.

Buxton Campus

In addition to the three main campuses, the school has an outdoor education facility in Buxton, near Marysville, and a rowing shed on the banks of the Yarra River. It previously leased the historical mansion Billilla in Halifax Street, Brighton, from the Bayside City Council. In 2009, the Buxton outdoor education centre was temporarily closed due to extensive damage from the Black Saturday bushfires in Victoria, and was later sold in 2015.

== Houses ==
=== Senior Campus ===
After existing in some form for several decades, in 1977, the system of inter-house sport and activities was restructured. Each house was assigned a housemaster and seven tutors. Boys are split up into these seven tutor groups within each house and the tutor group meets each day with the tutor acting as mentor during their four-year attendance. House meetings take place around once a week, lockers are organised according to house and several inter-house sporting events are held each year. In 1991, the houses, previously known by their colour, were given names. and in 2010, the new houses of MacKillop and Regis were added.

House	Named after	Motto	Premierships ^{†}	Number of Premierships
Bellarmine	Robert Bellarmine	Integrity In All	1998, 2018	2
Cheshire	Leonard Cheshire	No Call Ignored	1992, 1997, 2021	3
Claver	Peter Claver	To Serve Not Be Served	1995, 2004, 2009, 2010^{‡}, 2016, 2017, 2026	7
Gonzaga	Aloysius Gonzaga	No Greater Love	1991, 1993, 1996, 2006, 2010^{‡}, 2011	6
Ignatius	Ignatius of Loyola	To God Alone The Glory	2025	1
MacKillop	Mary MacKillop	Virtue Conquers All	2012, 2015, 2020, 2023, 2024	5
Mannix	Daniel Mannix	Love One Another	2000, 2014, 2022	3
Regis	John Francis Regis	Courage Burns Within	—	—
Ricci	Matteo Ricci	To Understand The Unknown	1994, 1999, 2001, 2015	4
Spinola	Charles Spinola	Always and Ever Faithful	2003, 2005, 2007, 2008, 2013, 2019	6

^{†} Unawarded 2001–2002.

^{‡} Gonzaga and Claver shared the 2010 Old Xaverians Trophy for the Champion House, having accumulated the same number of points throughout the year.

=== Burke Hall ===
The six houses of Burke Hall had existed for many years as Hodgson, Ignatius, Studley, Surbiton, Trawalla, and Waverley. In 1987, two new houses were added and with the exception of Ignatius, the houses were renamed. Due to the Year Seven and Eights moving to the Senior Campus in 2024, new houses were made for the Junior School and were implemented at the start of the 2024 school year.

House	Named after	Motto	Premierships
Aloysius	Aloysius Gonzaga	No Greater Love	1999, 2005, 2008, 2009, 2023
Campion	Edmund Campion	The Expense Is Reckoned	1987^{‡}, 1989, 1990, 1991, 1993, 1995, 1998, 2001, 2006^{‡}, 2013, 2018, 2019
Claver	Peter Claver	To Serve Not Be Served	1988, 2010, 2022
Ignatius	Ignatius of Loyola	To God Alone The Glory	1992, 2012, 2014
Loyola	Ignatius of Loyola	And Not To Count The Cost	2002, 2007, 2011
Owen	Nicholas Owen	Unless The Lord Builds	2003, 2004, 2006^{‡} 2014
Regis	John Francis Regis	Your Word My Light	1994, 1997, 2016
Southwell	Robert Southwell	Who Least Hath Some	1987^{‡}, 1996, 2000, 2017, 2020

^{‡} Tied premierships: 1987, 2006.

=== Kostka Hall ===
Awards commenced in 1971.

House	Named after	Motto	Premierships
Campion (formerly Tully House)	Edmund Campion	The Expense Is Reckoned	1976, 1977, 1991, 1992, 1994, 2003, 2004, 2005, 2006, 2007
Claver (formerly Hackett House)	Peter Claver	To Serve Not Be Served	1973, 1974, 1979, 1984, 1985, 1987, 1990, 1998, 1999, 2000, 2002, 2009
Owen (formerly Maritima House)	Nicholas Owen	Unless The Lord Builds	1972, 1975, 1981, 1982, 1986, 1989, 1995, 1996, 1997
Regis (formerly Craig House)	John Francis Regis	Your Word My Light	1971, 1978, 1980, 1983, 1988, 1993, 2001, 2008

== Curriculum ==
Xavier offers its senior students the Victorian Certificate of Education (VCE). Thirty-three VCE subjects and five external VET studies are offered. Xavier is one of only fifteen schools in Victoria to offer Latin and one of only two schools which offer Ancient Greek, which it has done continuously since 1878. Xavier and sister school Genazzano FCJ College have collaborated to develop a cross curriculum appreciation of the Classics as seen in both schools' having Latin as a LOTE option. Xavier does not offer the International Baccalaureate.

Xavier has a strong academic history. For each of the past sixteen years (excluding 2009 and 2015) the Dux of the school received an ATAR score of 99.95, the highest possible. In 2008, 2010, 2011 and 2016, three students achieved this mark at Xavier out of 32 in the state. In 2012, five students achieved the maximum ATAR of 99.95.

Xavier College VCE results 2012-2020
Year	Rank	Median study score	Scores of 40+ (%)	Cohort size
2012	37	34	21.4	458
2013	63	33	18.8	451
2014	64	33	17.8	468
2015	69	33	16.6	442
2016	67	33	14.1	430
2017	66	33	15.0	399
2018	53	34	17.0	391
2019	56	34	16.2	417
2020	45	34	19.2	399

== Co-curriculum ==
The main activities include Sport, Music, Drama, Debating, and Community Service. Students may also join specific interest groups such as the Chess Club. Outdoor Education is compulsory in Years 5 to 10, and students spend up to one week at a range of venues, where they are given instruction in a variety of activities.

=== Community service ===
Students are encouraged to participate in community service, and a minimum amount of completed service hours is mandated. Each Friday evening Xavier students volunteer their time at a tutoring school in housing commission apartments in Richmond, where many residents are recent migrants or refugees. This activity is completed with students from the sister school Genazzano FCJ College. Year 11 students are required to participate in an additional 35 hours while on a week-long community service placement.

In collaboration with Genazzano FCJ College, Xavier College participates in a community outreach program in conjunction with the combined parishes of Our Lady of Good Counsel, Deepdene, Sacred Heart, Kew and Immaculate Conception, Hawthorn. For the duration of one week, 12 students from the partnered schools participate in a community building program in Bourke, an Outback town of New South Wales.

=== Debating ===
From Year 8 and above, students have the opportunity to participate in the Toorak division of the Debaters Association of Victoria competition. The college also takes part in the annual Jesuit Schools' Debating Carnival competing with other JACSA schools, including Aloysius, Ignatius Riverview, Ignatius Adelaide and Loyola Watsonia.

=== Sport ===
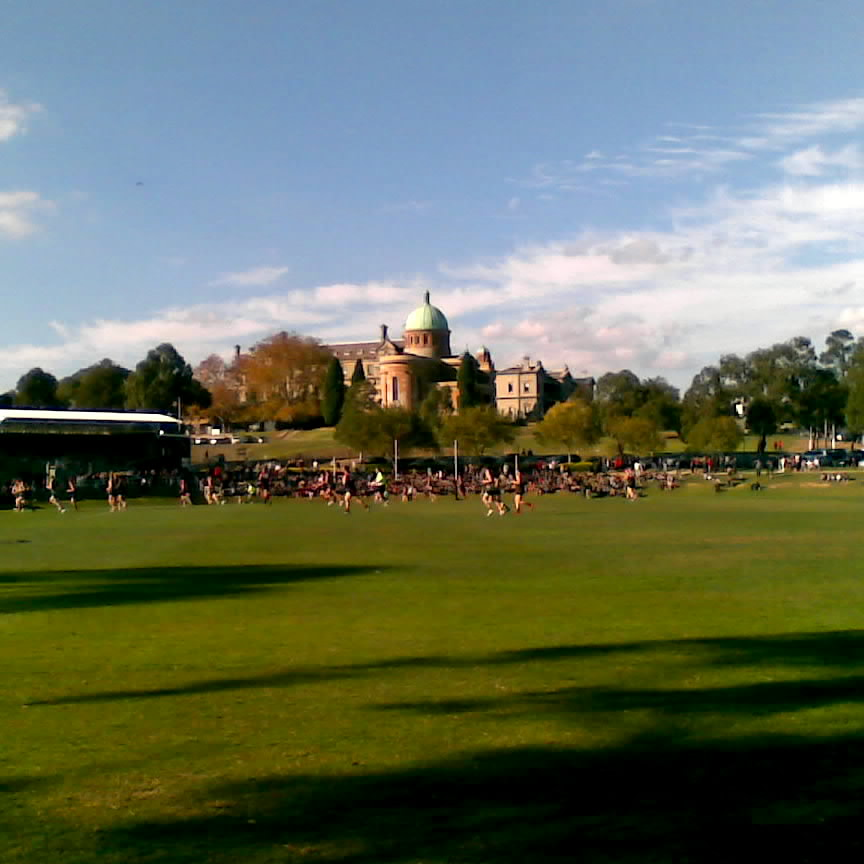
(L–R) The Memorial Chapel on top of the hill overlooking a game of Australian rules football being played on the Roche Oval, Xavier College.

Sport is compulsory for all students at Xavier, and in addition to cricket and Australian rules football, a range of sporting activities are offered including athletics, badminton, basketball, cross country, hockey, lawn bowls, martial arts, rowing, rugby union, sailing soccer, swimming, table tennis, tennis, triathlon, water polo, and volleyball.

Cricket alongside rowing (colloquially known as XCBC) are the two biggest summer sports at the college. Two alumni who pursued careers in cricket were Percy McDonnell (1860–1896) who captained the Australian Test team in six matches, including the tour of England in 1888, and Karl Schneider (1905–1928), who is described in Cricinfo as one of "the most naturally gifted batsmen to have graced the game". While at the school, he played in the 1st XI for four years, three of which as captain. He broke the APS runs (1642) and wickets (139) records which remain unbroken, and captained Xavier to back-to-back premierships in 1923–24.

Xavier has won the rowing APS Head of the River 5 times. Sixteen Xavier rowers have gone on to represent Australia, winning multiple Olympic and World Championship medals, including, among others, Peter Antonie, Michael McKay, Nick Green & Simon Keenan.

The school's Australian rules football team has produced numerous VFL/AFL players, and has won thirty football premierships, third of the APS schools behind Scotch (36) and Melbourne Grammar (35). The Old Xaverians Football Club has also been successful in the Victorian Amateur Football Association (VAFA), winning eight premierships in the last decade.

Along with football, the school's Old Xaverian community also links with the Old Xaverians Soccer Club and Old Xaverians Athletics Club.

==== APS Premierships ====
Xavier has won the following APS premierships:

- Athletics (16) – 1957, 1961, 1963, 1964, 1965, 1967, 1968, 1969, 1970, 1975, 1976, 1977, 1979, 1980, 1991, 2009
- Basketball (3) – 2000, 2014, 2019
- Cricket (11) – 1910, 1923, 1924, 1974, 1986, 1998, 2002, 2004, 2009, 2010, 2020
- Cross Country (3) – 2004, 2008, 2014
- Football (30) – 1910, 1917, 1924, 1932, 1933, 1955, 1964, 1965, 1973, 1976, 1977, 1978, 1980, 1981, 1984, 1985, 1986, 1987, 1988, 1989, 1990, 1991, 1993, 1994, 1998, 2000, 2001, 2002, 2003, 2021
- Futsal (3) – 2015, 2020, 2021
- Hockey (4) – 1999, 2004, 2005, 2007
- Rowing (5) – 1928, 1929, 1937, 1948, 1999
- Soccer (10) – 1997, 1998, 2002, 2007, 2008, 2011, 2015, 2017, 2018, 2022, 2024
- Tennis (4) – 1995, 2007, 2008, 2009
- Volleyball (2) – 2014, 2018
- Water Polo (8) – 2006, 2007, 2013, 2014, 2015, 2016, 2017, 2019
- Touch football (0) -

=== Performing Arts ===
Performing Arts have been part of the school's activities since 1929, with Musical Theatre/Operetta and Dramatic Plays having a shared focus in the college's co-curricular program. The school conducts an annual Senior Musical Production with Genazzano FCJ College as well as the annual Winter Play and Spring Play, which has been performed in collaboration with Loreto Mandeville Hall since 2000. The two Junior Campuses also have Performing Arts and Dramatic programs, each staging a major production every year. With the development of both the Crypt Drama Studio, below the Memorial Chapel, in 1999 and the Eldon Hogan Performing Arts Centre, performing arts at the college has become an integral part in the school's co-curricular program.

The Yearly Senior Calendar includes:

- Annual Musical Production in late February/early March, produced in association with Genazzano FCJ College. (Year 10, 11, 12)
- The Comedy Revue, run entirely by and for students in late March. (Year 9, 10, 11, 12)
- VCE Theatre Studies Play, produced by the VCE Theatre Studies Class in May. (Year 11, 12)
- Annual Winter Play, produced in late July in association with Loreto Mandevalle Hall Toorak. (Year 9, 10, 11, 12)
- VCE Theatre Studies and Drama Solo and Monologue Performance Night in late September (Year 11, 12)
- Spring Play, coordinated and held at Loreto Mandevalle Hall, Toorak, in association with Xavier College Drama. (Year 9, 10, 11)

== Maytime Fair ==
The Maytime Fair has been held annually in May since 1952 and is hosted by Xavier College. It raises funds for the work of the Jesuit Mission, with support from friends and benefactors connected with schools, parishes, and other communities in Victoria and beyond. The annual fairs have been assisted by traditional sister school Genazzano FCJ College, and together, the two schools have provided a number of student-run stalls such as "Go Nuts for Donuts", a Fairy Tent and face-painting, amongst others.

Each stall and attraction at the Maytime Fair donates its profit to the work of Jesuit Mission. The Maytime Fair consistently contributes over $100,000 each year for work in the developing world, including India, Cambodia, East Timor and Myanmar. In 2008 over $130,000 was raised, which was given to assist in the relief effort by Jesuit Missionaries in response to the 2008 Sichuan earthquake. In 2010, over $150,000 was raised, and in 2016 $260,000 was raised

== Notable alumni ==
Alumni of Xavier College are known as Old Xaverians, and all former students are members of the Old Xaverians' Association (OXA).

In politics, academia and the law, Xavier's alumni include:

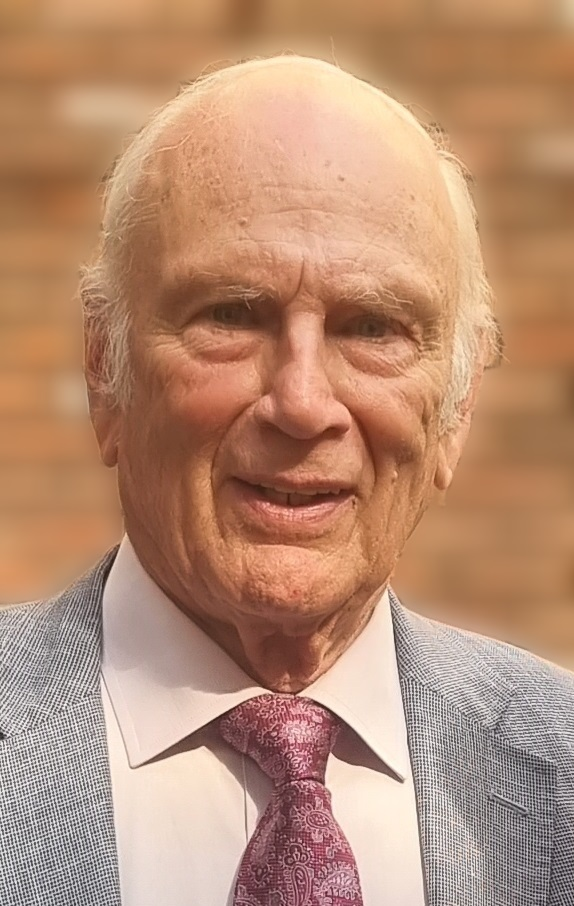
Richard Alston, an Old Xaverian and former Senator

- Richard Alston, former Federal minister and diplomat
- William Cox, former Governor of Tasmania
- Tim Fischer, former Deputy Prime Minister
- Sir James Gobbo, former Governor of Victoria
- Rob Hulls, former Deputy Premier of Victoria
- Phillip Lynch, former federal Treasurer and Deputy Leader of federal Opposition
- Julian McGauran, former Senator for Victoria
- Peter McGauran, former Federal minister
- Pat McNamara, a former Deputy Premier of Victoria
- Richard Niall, Chief Justice designate of Victoria
- Brian O'Shaughnessy, philosopher
- T. J. Ryan, a former Premier of Queensland
- Bill Shorten, Minister for Government Services and the NDIS
- Simon Steward Judge of the High Court of Australia
- Dan Tehan, former Federal Minister

In other areas, notable Old Xaverians include:

- Luke Ball, former Collingwood AFL player
- Timothy Conigrave, actor, writer, and activist
- Sean Darcy, current Fremantle Dockers AFL player
- Robert De Castella, world champion marathon runner
- Peter Dahlsen, actor and barrister
- Will Davison, professional sports racing driver
- Paul Fitzgerald, Australian portrait artist
- James P. Gorman, CEO of Morgan Stanley
- Michael Green, former Richmond AFL player
- Dan Hannebery, current St Kilda AFL player
- Denis Hart, the 8th Catholic Archbishop of Melbourne
- Changkuoth Jiath, Hawthorn AFL player
- Alan Jones, Formula One world championship-winning driver
- Josh P. Kennedy, former Sydney Swans AFL captain
- Ted Richards, former Sydney Swans AFL player
- Willie Rioli, current West Coast Eagles AFL player
- Daniel Robinson, former Sydney Swans AFL player
- Bailey Smith, current Geelong Cats AFL player
- Laitham Vandermeer, Western Bulldogs AFL player
- Vigo Visentini, current Essendon AFL player
- Jobe Watson, former Essendon AFL captain
- Lloyd J. Williams, property developer and businessman

== In popular culture ==
- Holding the Man, a memoir, a play, and a feature film, begins at Kostka Hall and then the Senior Campus.
- Remembering the Man, a feature-length documentary about the memoir Holding the Man, includes footage and photos of the Xavier College Senior Campus in the late 1970s and interviews with former students.
- Barracuda, an Australian drama miniseries, had numerous scenes filmed at the Senior Campus.
- Sir Les Patterson, a fictional character portrayed by Barry Humphries, "attended" Xavier College.

== Historical sexual abuse allegations ==
In March 2013, a submission was made to Victoria's parliamentary inquiry into child sexual abuse about the alleged abuse of children in its care in the 1960s and 1970s.

== See also ==
- Catholic education in Australia
- List of schools in Victoria
- List of high schools in Victoria
- List of Jesuit schools
