= Greater Western Sydney–Western Bulldogs rivalry =

Australian Rules Football rivalry

GWS Giants–Western Bulldogs rivalry
- Greater Western Sydney Giants Western Bulldogs
- First meeting: 28 April 2012; GWS 9.8 (62) def. by WBD 15.14 (104); Manuka Oval
- Latest meeting: 14 March 2026; WBD 21.8 (134) def. GWS 7.11 (53); Docklands Stadium

Statistics
- Total meetings: 22
- All-time record: WBD, 12–7
- Regular season series: WBD, 11–6
- Postseason results: Tie, 1–1
- Largest victory: WBD, 88 points (31 July 2025)
- Longest win streak: WBD, 5 games
- Current win streak: WBD, 4 games

Finals Results
- 2016 AFL First Preliminary Final: GWS 12.11 (83) def. by WBD 13.11 (89); 2019 AFL finals series: GWS 16.17 (113) def. WBD 8.7 (55)

The Greater Western Sydney Giants–Western Bulldogs rivalry is an Australian rules football rivalry between the Greater Western Sydney Giants and the Western Bulldogs in the Australian Football League (AFL).

Prominent moments in the clubs' rivalry included the 2014 AFL trade period, held following the conclusion of that year's premiership season, during which Bulldogs captain Ryan Griffen and Giants number one draft pick Tom Boyd were exchanged in a trade deal, and the preliminary final in 2016, regarded as the best AFL game of the 2010s by the Seven Network.

== History ==
=== Early years ===
The Greater Western Sydney Giants entered the AFL in 2012 as the competition's 18th active club. The Giants played their first premiership match against the Bulldogs in round 5 in Canberra.

Following the 2014 season, Bulldogs captain Ryan Griffen sensationally requested a trade to the Giants. Griffen was widely regarded as the club's best player and had only been captain for one season. He later cited the stress of captaincy as his reason for nearly giving up the game altogether. The Bulldogs responded by luring the Giants' number-one draft pick, first-year key forward Tom Boyd, on a 7-year deal worth $7 million. Griffen and Boyd were ultimately exchanged in the same trade deal.

=== Finals rivals (2016–2019) ===
At the conclusion of the 2016 AFL season, Greater Western Sydney finished fourth on the ladder and the Western Bulldogs had finished seventh. The two teams met in the 2016 AFL First Preliminary Final at Spotless Stadium, in which the Bulldogs were attempting to make their first AFL grand final appearance in 55 years while the Giants were attempting to reach the grand final for the first time in their fifth season in the AFL.

Two goals to each side saw the Bulldogs lead by two points at the quarter-time break. The Bulldogs then kicked four goals to three in the second quarter, during which two players suffered game-ending injuries: Bulldogs ruckman Jordan Roughead, who had a ball kicked in his face, and Giants co-captain Callan Ward (lured to the Giants from the Bulldogs on a lucrative deal for the 2012 season), who was accidentally kneed in the head by Zaine Cordy. At half-time, the Bulldogs led by nine points. Three minutes into the third quarter, Rory Lobb kicked a goal for the Giants to bring the margin back to one point, before a rushed behind brought the scores level at 41. However, Tory Dickson kicked a goal shortly after to give his side back the lead; another goal to Lobb and one to Jonathan Patton saw the Giants open up an eleven-point lead, before late goals to Marcus Bontempelli and Caleb Daniel saw the Giants' lead reduced to one point at three-quarter-time. Two goals to the Giants to start the final quarter saw them take a 14-point lead, the biggest by any side during the match, before goals to Dickson, Bontempelli and Cordy saw the Bulldogs reclaim the lead. Shortly after, Patton would kick a goal for the Giants and, with less than five minutes remaining, scores were tied at 82 points apiece. Jack Macrae, who to that point of the season had only kicked one goal, was then paid a mark inside the Bulldogs' forward 50 despite a late spoil from Nick Haynes; he then kicked the match's final goal and despite some desperation from the Giants, the Bulldogs hung on to win by six points. The match was considered one of the best of the decade. The Bulldogs progressed to and won the 2016 AFL Grand Final the following week against the Sydney Swans.

In round 21, 2017, Giants small forward Toby Greene collected Bulldog Luke Dahlhaus in the face with his foot while flying for a mark. Greene avoided suspension for the incident, but was suspended for two matches suspension for punching Caleb Daniel's head the same year.

The Giants finished the 2019 season 6th with thirteen wins and the Bulldogs would finish 7th with twelve wins. They faced each other in a fierce and at times violent contest in the second elimination final, Greater Western Sydney winning by 58 points to progress to a semi-final and end the Bulldogs' season. In that game, the Giants and Bulldogs engaged in on-field fights, with GWS attacking Western Bulldogs superstar Marcus Bontempelli. Bontempelli escaped with a $7500 fine and was charged with serious misconduct for injuring Nick Haynes. Bontempelli was left with bruises around his right eye, and the Bulldogs players were privately fuming. Western Bulldogs players wished they had known that Greater Western Sydney antagonist Toby Greene targeted Marcus Bontempelli's face during an ugly scuffle which typified this year's heated elimination final. A host of Bulldogs, including Patrick Lipinski and teenagers Rhylee West and Bailey Smith, were in the vicinity when Greene grabbed at Bontempelli's face and then pulled his hair while at the bottom of a pack.

The bad blood from the elimination final persisted into round 3 of the 2020 AFL Season where The Giants turned sent Nick Haynes out for the coin toss instead of captain Stephen Coniglio to meet with Bulldogs skipper Marcus Bontempelli, who fractured Haynes’ larynx the previous year. The two teams engaged in constant melees throughout a match leaving 15 players cited by the AFL Match Review Panel with fines totalling $7750. The Bulldogs won by 24 points at Marvel Stadium.

=== 2021–present ===
In the final round of the 2023 AFL season, the Giants and Bulldogs were in indirect competition for the final spot in the finals. After the Bulldogs defeated the Geelong Cats on the Saturday night, Greater Western Sydney needed to draw with or beat Carlton to qualify and knock the Bulldogs out. The Giants succeeded, beating Carlton by 32 points.

== Head-to-head ==
	Year	Date	Timeslot	Rd	Home Team	Score	Away Team	Score	Ground	Crowd	Result/Winner	M	HRT	Streak
1	2012	28/4	Sat, 1:45pm	5	Greater Western Sydney	9.8 (62)	Western Bulldogs	15.14 (104)	Manuka Oval	9,128	Western Bulldogs	42	W	+1
2	2013	6/7	Sat 1:45pm	15	Greater Western Sydney	12.11 (83)	Western Bulldogs	13.9 (87)	Manuka Oval	7,132	Western Bulldogs	4	W	+2
3	2014	12/4	Sat 4:40pm	4	Greater Western Sydney	12.11 (83)	Western Bulldogs	17.8 (110)	Manuka Oval	7,863	Western Bulldogs	27	L	+3
4	2014	31/8	Sun 4:40pm	23	Western Bulldogs	15.19 (109)	Greater Western Sydney	18.7 (115)	Docklands Stadium	14,725	Greater Western Sydney	6	L	+1
5	2015	30/5	Sat 4:35pm	9	Western Bulldogs	16.17 (113)	Greater Western Sydney	11.2 (68)	Docklands Stadium	16,395	Western Bulldogs	45	L	+1
6	2016	22/5	Sun 3:20pm	9	Greater Western Sydney	15.8 (98)	Western Bulldogs	10.13 (73)	Sydney Showground Stadium	9,621	Greater Western Sydney	25	W	+1
7	2016	24/9	Sat 5:15pm	PF	Greater Western Sydney	12.11 (83)	Western Bulldogs	13.11 (89)	Sydney Showground Stadium	21,790	Western Bulldogs	6	L	+1
8	2017	28/4	Fri 7:50pm	6	Greater Western Sydney	11.9 (75)	Western Bulldogs	9.19 (73)	Manuka Oval	14,048	Greater Western Sydney	2	W	+1
9	2017	11/8	Fri 7:50pm	21	Western Bulldogs	7.15 (57)	Greater Western Sydney	16.9 (105)	Docklands Stadium	30,672	Greater Western Sydney	48	W	+2
10	2018	25/3	Sun 1:10pm	1	Greater Western Sydney	20.13 (133)	Western Bulldogs	7.9 (51)	Manuka Oval	10,454	Greater Western Sydney	82	–	+3
11	2019	18/8	Sun 3:20pm	22	Greater Western Sydney	9.11 (65)	Western Bulldogs	19.12 (126)	Sydney Showground Stadium	10,139	Western Bulldogs	61	L	+1
12	2019	7/9	Sat 3:20pm	EF	Greater Western Sydney	16.17 (113)	Western Bulldogs	8.7 (55)	Sydney Showground Stadium	19,218	Greater Western Sydney	58	W	+1
13	2020	19/6	Fri 7:50pm	3	Western Bulldogs	8.9 (57)	Greater Western Sydney	4.9 (33)	Docklands Stadium	0^{[a]}	Western Bulldogs	24	L	+1
14	2021	23/4	Fri 7:50pm	6	Greater Western Sydney	9.11 (65)	Western Bulldogs	15.14 (104)	Manuka Oval	10,064	Western Bulldogs	39	W	+2
15	2022	18/6	Sat 7:25pm	14	Greater Western Sydney	16.9 (105)	Western Bulldogs	19.11 (125)	Sydney Showground Stadium	6,208	Western Bulldogs	20	W	+3
16	2022	13/8	Sat 1:45	22	Western Bulldogs	9.8 (62)	Greater Western Sydney	8.9 (57)	Docklands Stadium	18,301	Western Bulldogs	5	W	+4
17	2023	6/5	Sat 7:30pm	8	Greater Western Sydney	10.11 (71)	Western Bulldogs	13.8 (86)	Manuka Oval	10,039	Western Bulldogs	15	W	+5
18	2023	29/6	Sat 1:45pm	20	Western Bulldogs	10.13 (73)	Greater Western Sydney	11.12 (78)	Eureka Stadium	9,080	Greater Western Sydney	5	L	+1
19	2024	18/5	Sat 4:35pm	10	Greater Western Sydney	6.7 (43)	Western Bulldogs	8.22 (70)	Sydney Showground Stadium	7,747	Western Bulldogs	27	L	+1
20	2024	25/8	Sun 12:30pm	24	Western Bulldogs	14.14 (98)	Greater Western Sydney	9.7 (61)	Eureka Stadium	10,224	Western Bulldogs	37	L	+2
21	2025	31/8	Thu 7:30pm	21	Western Bulldogs	19.18 (132)	Greater Western Sydney	6.8 (44)	Docklands Stadium	23,898	Western Bulldogs	88	L	+3
22	2026	14/3	Sat 1:15pm	1	Western Bulldogs	21.18 (134)	Greater Western Sydney	7.11 (53)	Docklands Stadium	28,318	Western Bulldogs	81	L	+4

^{a} Crowds impacted by COVID-19

== Common individuals ==
=== Players ===
The following players have played for both the Giants and the Bulldogs in their careers.

Player	Years at Bulldogs	Years at Giants
Callan Ward	2008–2011	2012–2025
Sam Reid	2008–2011	2012–2013; 2016–2021
Dylan Addison	2006–2011	2013–2015
Ryan Griffen	2005–2014	2015–2018
Sam Darley	2014–2015	2012–2013
Tom Boyd	2015–2019	2014
Adam Treloar	2021–present	2012–2015
Josh Bruce	2020–2023	2012–2013
Rory Lobb	2023–present	2014–2018
Matthew Kennedy	2025–present	2016–2017
Jake Stringer	2013–2017	2025–present

=== Others ===
- Leon Cameron – Bulldogs (1990–1999 player), Giants (2014–2022 senior coach)
- Jason McCartney – Bulldogs (2011–2017 manager), Giants (2017–present list manager)
