= 2016 Western Bulldogs season =

Western Bulldogs

Names
- Full name: Western Bulldogs (official name)
- Nickname(s): Bulldogs, Doggies, Dogs, Bullies, Pups, The Scray, Scraggers
- Motto: Cede Nullis ("Yield To None")

2016 season
- After finals: 1st (Premiers)
- Home-and-away season: 7th
- Leading goalkicker: Jake Stringer (42 goals)
- Charles Sutton Medal: Marcus Bontempelli

Club details
- Founded: 1877 (entered 1925)
- Colours: Red White Blue
- Competition: Australian Football League
- President: Peter Gordon
- CEO: Simon Garlick
- Coach: Luke Beveridge
- Captain: Bob Murphy
- Premierships: VFL/AFL (2): 1954, 2016; Championship of Victoria (1): 1924; VFA/VFL (11): 1898, 1899, 1900, 1908, 1913, 1919, 1920, 1923, 1924, 2014, 2016
- Grounds: Docklands Stadium (capacity: 56,347)
- Eureka Stadium (capacity: 11,000)
- Training ground: Whitten Oval (training base) currently known as Victoria University Whitten Oval

Other information
- Official website: westernbulldogs.com.au
- Guernsey: Blue with Red and White horizontal hoops

The 2016 season was the Western Bulldogs' 91st year in the Australian Football League (AFL). It was just their second year under coach Luke Beveridge, with Bob Murphy being appointed captain for the second year in a row. However, due to an injury Murphy suffered in the opening rounds of the season, Easton Wood took over the captaincy for the remainder of the year. The club's regular season began on 27 March against the Fremantle Dockers at Marvel Stadium. The Bulldogs finished off the home & away season with 15 wins and 7 losses, placing them at 7th on the ladder. The Bulldogs went on to win the 2016 AFL Grand Final, capturing their first VFL/AFL Premiership since 1954.

== Playing list ==
=== Changes ===
At the end of the 2015 season, the Bulldogs delisted Ayce Cordy, Brett Goodes, Matthew Fuller, Sam Darley, Daniel Pearce, Jordan Kelly and Jarrad Grant from their list. Grant was later recruited by the Gold Coast. as delisted free agents. Michael Talia was also traded to Sydney after controversy surrounding him allegedly leaking game plans to his brother.

== Premiership season ==
=== Round 1 ===
| | Round 1 (Opening Round) |
| Sunday, 27 March (1:10 pm) | Western Bulldogs 15.13 (103) | def. | Fremantle 5.8 (38) | Etihad Stadium (crowd: 27,832) | Report |

=== Round 2 ===
| | Round 2 |
| Saturday, 2 April (7:25 pm) | St Kilda 5.6 (36) | def. by | Western Bulldogs 13.15 (93) | Etihad Stadium (crowd: 37,353) | Report |

=== Round 3 ===
| | Round 3 |
| Sunday, 10 April (3:20 pm) | Western Bulldogs 13.12 (90) | def. by | Hawthorn 14.9 (93) | Etihad Stadium (crowd: 46,808) | Report |

=== Round 4 ===
| | Round 4 |
| Saturday, 16 April (7:25 pm) | Carlton 7.7 (49) | def. by | Western Bulldogs 13.7 (85) | Etihad Stadium (crowd: 27,622) | Report |

=== Round 5 ===
| | Round 5 (Anzac Round) |
| Saturday, 23 April (7:25 pm) | Western Bulldogs 17.18 (120) | def. | Brisbane Lions 10.7 (67) | Etihad Stadium (crowd: 25,097) | Report |

=== Round 6 ===
| | Round 6 |
| Friday, 29 April (7:50 pm) | North Melbourne 9.7 (61) | def. | Western Bulldogs 6.9 (45) | Etihad Stadium (crowd: 47,622) | Report |

=== Round 7 ===
| | Round 7 |
| Saturday, 7 May (7:25 pm) | Western Bulldogs 18.15 (123) | def. | Adelaide 17.6 (108) | Etihad Stadium (crowd: 26,984) | Report |

=== Round 8 ===
| | Round 8 |
| Sunday, 15 May (3:20 pm) | Melbourne 12.10 (82) | def. by | Western Bulldogs 17.12 (114) | MCG (crowd: 39,921) | Report |

=== Round 9 ===
| | Round 9 |
| Sunday, 22 May (3:20 pm) | Greater Western Sydney 15.8 (98) | def. | Western Bulldogs 10.13 (73) | Spotless Stadium (crowd: 9,612) | Report |

=== Round 10 ===
| | Round 10 (Sir Doug Nicholls Round) |
| Sunday, 29 May (3:20 pm) | Collingwood 7.11 (53) | def. by | Western Bulldogs 11.8 (74) | MCG (crowd: 45,078) | Report |

=== Round 11 ===
| | Round 11 |
| Sunday, 5 June (3:20 pm) | Western Bulldogs 12.11 (83) | def. | West Coast 11.9 (75) | Etihad Stadium (crowd: 28,769) | Report |

=== Round 12 ===
| | Round 12 |
| Saturday, 11 June (1:10 pm) | Port Adelaide 14.13 (97) | def. by | Western Bulldogs 15.10 (100) | Adelaide Oval (crowd: 40,096) | Report |

=== Round 13 ===
| | Round 13 |
| Saturday, 18 June (7:25 pm) | Western Bulldogs 5.13 (43) | def. by | Geelong 16.4 (100) | Etihad Stadium (crowd: 41,725) | Report |

=== Round 14 ===
| Round 14 |
| Bye; Western Bulldogs |

=== Round 15 ===
| | Round 15 |
| Saturday, 2 July (4:35 pm) | Sydney 11.13 (79) | def. by | Western Bulldogs 13.5 (83) | SCG (crowd: 33,386) | Report |

=== Round 16 ===
| | Round 16 (Multicultural Round) |
| Saturday, 9 July (7:25 pm) | Western Bulldogs 12.13 (85) | def. | Richmond 11.9 (75) | Etihad Stadium (crowd: 39,679) | Report |

=== Round 17 ===
| | Round 17 |
| Saturday, 16 July (7:25 pm) | Western Bulldogs 15.17 (107) | def. | Gold Coast 8.11 (59) | Cazaly's Stadium (crowd: 8,509) | Report |

=== Round 18 ===
| | Round 18 |
| Saturday, 23 July (7:25 pm) | Western Bulldogs 9.6 (60) | def. by | St Kilda 11.9 (75) | Etihad Stadium (crowd: 26,532) | Report |

=== Round 19 ===
| | Round 19 |
| Friday, 29 July (7:50 pm) | Geelong 16.7 (103) | def. | Western Bulldogs 11.12 (78) | Simonds Stadium (crowd: 24,331) | Report |

=== Round 20 ===
| | Round 20 |
| Saturday, 6 August (7:25 pm) | Western Bulldogs 9.7 (61) | def. | North Melbourne 7.5 (47) | Etihad Stadium (crowd: 30,740) | Report |

=== Round 21 ===
| | Round 21 |
| Friday, 12 August (7:50 pm) | Western Bulldogs 14.11 (95) | def. | Collingwood 14.8 (92) | Etihad Stadium (crowd: 35,010) | Report |

=== Round 22 ===
| | Round 22 |
| Sunday, 21 August (4:40 pm) | Essendon 7.11 (53) | def. by | Western Bulldogs 14.9 (93) | Etihad Stadium (crowd: 25,308) | Report |

=== Round 23 ===
| | Round 23 |
| Sunday, 28 August (2:40 pm) | Fremantle 10.9 (69) | def. | Western Bulldogs 6.13 (49) | Domain Stadium (crowd: 34,765) | Report |

== Ladder ==
| Pos | Team | Pld | W | L | D | PF | PA | PP | Pts | Qualification |
|---|---|---|---|---|---|---|---|---|---|---|
| 1 | Sydney | 22 | 17 | 5 | 0 | 2221 | 1469 | 151.2 | 68 | 2016 finals |
| 2 | Geelong | 22 | 17 | 5 | 0 | 2235 | 1554 | 143.8 | 68 | 2016 finals |
| 3 | Hawthorn | 22 | 17 | 5 | 0 | 2134 | 1800 | 118.6 | 68 | 2016 finals |
| 4 | Greater Western Sydney | 22 | 16 | 6 | 0 | 2380 | 1663 | 143.1 | 64 | 2016 finals |
| 5 | Adelaide | 22 | 16 | 6 | 0 | 2483 | 1795 | 138.3 | 64 | 2016 finals |
| 6 | West Coast | 22 | 16 | 6 | 0 | 2181 | 1678 | 130.0 | 64 | 2016 finals |
| 7 | Western Bulldogs (P) | 22 | 15 | 7 | 0 | 1857 | 1609 | 115.4 | 60 | 2016 finals |
| 8 | North Melbourne | 22 | 12 | 10 | 0 | 1956 | 1859 | 105.2 | 48 | 2016 finals |
| 9 | St Kilda | 22 | 12 | 10 | 0 | 1953 | 2041 | 95.7 | 48 | |
| 10 | Port Adelaide | 22 | 10 | 12 | 0 | 2055 | 1939 | 106.0 | 40 | |
| 11 | Melbourne | 22 | 10 | 12 | 0 | 1944 | 1991 | 97.6 | 40 | |
| 12 | Collingwood | 22 | 9 | 13 | 0 | 1910 | 1998 | 95.6 | 36 | |
| 13 | Richmond | 22 | 8 | 14 | 0 | 1713 | 2155 | 79.5 | 32 | |
| 14 | Carlton | 22 | 7 | 15 | 0 | 1568 | 1978 | 79.3 | 28 | |
| 15 | Gold Coast | 22 | 6 | 16 | 0 | 1778 | 2273 | 78.2 | 24 | |
| 16 | Fremantle | 22 | 4 | 18 | 0 | 1574 | 2119 | 74.3 | 16 | |
| 17 | Brisbane Lions | 22 | 3 | 19 | 0 | 1770 | 2872 | 61.6 | 12 | |
| 18 | Essendon | 22 | 3 | 19 | 0 | 1437 | 2356 | 61.0 | 12 | |

Source: AFL
Rules for classification: 1) points; 2) percentage; 3) number of points for.
(P) Premiers

== 2016 AFL Finals Series ==
=== Week one (elimination final) ===
==== Second elimination final (West Coast v Western Bulldogs) ====
The opening match of the 2016 finals series saw the first final played on a Thursday night as opposed to the traditional Friday night start to a finals series with the sixth placed West Coast hosting the seventh placed Western Bulldogs at Domain Stadium. The Eagles had finished the season with a 16–6 win–loss record and searched for consistency throughout the year after finishing runners up to Hawthorn in the 2015 AFL Grand Final, where they lost by 46 points. They headed into the finals in strong form, however, banking two interstate wins over Greater Western Sydney and Adelaide as well as beating the Hawks at home to finish with a home final. The Western Bulldogs had qualified for their second consecutive finals series for the first time since 2010 and battled with injuries throughout the year, finishing with a 15–7 win–loss record. Despite this, they managed to beat the Eagles, Crows and Sydney during the home and away season.

This was the first final between the two sides in ten years, with the Eagles defeating the Bulldogs comfortably in the 2006 First Semi Final, also at Subiaco Oval, by 74 points en route to securing the 2006 premiership. They also met in the 1998 Qualifying Final at the MCG, with the Western Bulldogs winning by 70 points.

The only meeting between the two clubs in the regular season saw the Western Bulldogs win a close-fought contest by eight points at Etihad Stadium in round 11.

Scorecard

Second elimination final
8 September (6:10 pm) | West Coast | def. by | Western Bulldogs | Domain Stadium (crowd: 42,079) | Report
2.3 (15); 3.6 (24); 5.9 (39); 7.10 (52) | Q1; Q2; Q3; Final | 4.4 (28); 7.6 (48); 11.9 (75); 14.15 (99) | Umpires: Luke Farmer, Brett Rosebury, Justin Schmitt; Television broadcast: Seven Network, Fox Footy (simulcast)
2: Kennedy, Darling; 1: Brown, LeCras, Hill | Goals | 2: Picken, Dunkley, Dickson; 1: Dahlhaus, Hunter, Smith, Bontempelli, Daniel, Roughead, Liberatore, Stringer
Hutchings, Gaff, Shuey, Butler, Hurn | Best | Dahlhaus, Daniel, M.Boyd, Picken, Hunter, Johannisen
Nil | Injuries | Jong (right shoulder)
Nil | Reports | Nil

=== Week two (semi-finals) ===
==== Second semi-final (Hawthorn v Western Bulldogs) ====
Scorecard

Second semi-final
16 September (7:50 pm) | Hawthorn | def. by | Western Bulldogs | MCG (crowd: 87,823) | Report
3.4 (22); 7.5 (47); 8.9 (57); 12.12 (84) | Q1; Q2; Q3; Final | 1.5 (11); 6.10 (46); 12.11 (83); 16.11 (107) | Umpires: Chris Donlon, Matt Stevic, Mathew Nicholls; Television broadcast: Seven Network, Fox Footy (simulcast)
2: Shiels, Hodge; 1: Sicily, Gunston, Puopolo, Rioli, Hill, Breust, Fitzpatrick, Burgoyne | Goals | 3: Stringer, Picken; 2: Smith, Bontempelli; 1: Wood, McLean, Dunkley, Roughead, Dickson, Daniel
Shiels, Hodge, Mitchell, Smith, Duryea | Best | Bontempelli, Macrae, Picken, Smith, Dunkley, Dahlhaus
Lewis (hamstring) | Injuries | Nil
Nil | Reports | Nil
The Western Bulldogs won two consecutive finals matches for the first time since 1961.

==== First preliminary final (Greater Western Sydney v Western Bulldogs) ====
First preliminary final
24 September (5:15 pm) | Greater Western Sydney | def. by | Western Bulldogs | Spotless Stadium (crowd: 21,790) | Report
2.1 (13); 5.2 (32); 9.7 (61); 12.11 (83) | Q1; Q2; Q3; Final | 2.3 (15); 6.5 (41); 9.6 (60); 13.11 (89) | Umpires: Mathew Nicholls, Justin Schmitt, Simon Meredith; Television broadcast: Seven Network, Fox Footy (simulcast)
4: Patton; 3: Greene, Lobb; 1: D. Smith, Shaw | Goals | 4: C. Smith, Dickson; 2: Cordy; 1: Daniel, Bontempelli, Macrae
Kelly, Scully, Patton, Coniglio, Wilson, Greene | Best | C. Smith, Dahlhaus, Dickson, Morris, Wood, Johannisen, Macrae, Picken
Ward (concussion) | Injuries | Roughead (eye)
Nil | Reports | Nil

=== Week four (Grand Final) ===
Grand final
1 October (2:30 pm) | Sydney | def. by | Western Bulldogs | MCG (crowd: 99,981) | Report
1.2 (8); 7.3 (45); 8.5 (53); 10.7 (67) | Q1; Q2; Q3; Final | 2.0 (12); 7.1 (43); 9.7 (61); 13.11 (89) | Umpires: Matt Stevic, Simon Meredith, Scott Jeffery; Norm Smith Medal: Jason Johannisen; Television broadcast: Seven Network; National anthem: Vika and Linda Bull
3: Kennedy; 2: Mitchell; 1: Parker, N. Smith, Rohan, Franklin, Hewett | Goals | 3: T. Boyd, Dickson, Picken; 1: Cordy, McLean, C. Smith, Stringer
Kennedy, Mitchell, Rampe, Heeney, Jones, Hannebery | Best | Johannisen, Picken, T. Boyd, Macrae, M. Boyd, Dahlhaus
Franklin (right ankle), Hannebery (left knee) | Injuries | Johannisen (calf)
Nil | Reports | Nil
Western Bulldogs won their first premiership in sixty-two years, breaking the longest active drought in VFL/AFL history.; The Western Bulldogs became just the second club after Adelaide in 1997 to win four consecutive finals to win a premiership.

== See also ==
- 2016 AFL season
- 2016 AFL Grand Final
