= Greater Western Sydney v Western Bulldogs (2016 AFL preliminary final) =

2016 AFL First Preliminary Final
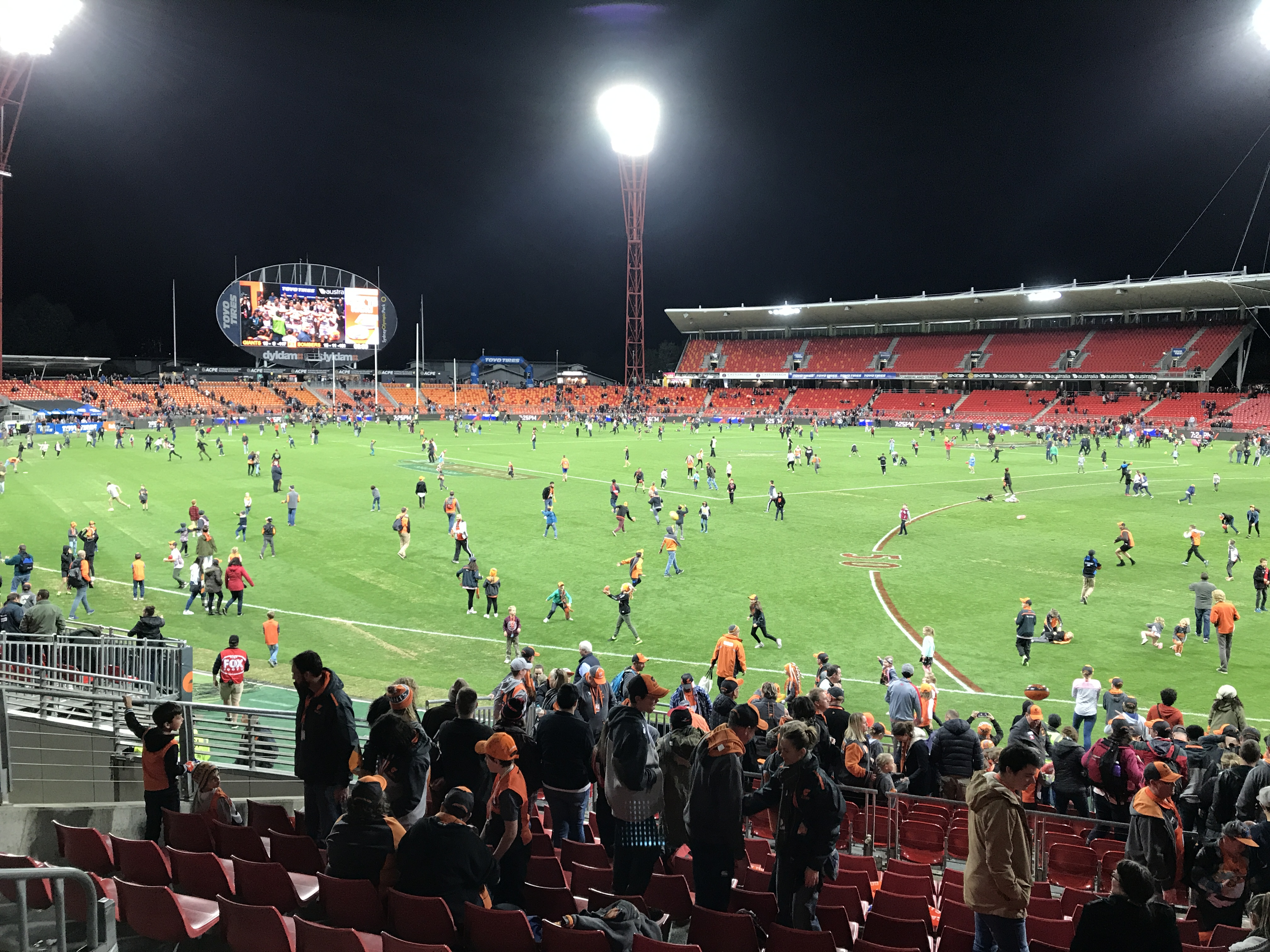

| Greater Western Sydney | Footscray |
|---|---|
| 12.11 (83) | 13.11 (89) |
- Date: 24 September 2016
- Stadium: Spotless Stadium; Sydney
- Attendance: 21,790

Broadcast in Australia
- Network: Seven Network
- Commentators: Brian Taylor; Luke Darcy; Cameron Ling; Matthew Richardson

The 2016 AFL First Preliminary Final was an Australian rules football match contested between the Greater Western Sydney Giants and Western Bulldogs at Spotless Stadium on 24 September 2016. It was staged as part of the 2016 AFL finals series to determine which of the two clubs would qualify for that season's Grand Final.

In their fifth season in the AFL, and first finals series, the Giants were attempting to reach their first Grand Final, while the Bulldogs were looking to reach their first Grand Final since 1961. The match was won by the Western Bulldogs, who eventually went on to win their first premiership since 1954.

Given the historical context, stakes and high quality of the match as well as its close finish, it is often considered by many fans to be one of the best AFL matches played in the 2010s.

== Background ==
The 2016 AFL season was contested by eighteen clubs between March and October 2016. The top eight clubs qualified for the finals series, which was conducted under the AFL finals system introduced in 2000 AFL season.

At the conclusion of the regular season, Greater Western Sydney finished fourth on the ladder with 16 wins and 6 losses, meaning it would face minor premiers and cross-town rivals Sydney in a Qualifying final. Contrary to expectations, the Giants won by 36 points at Stadium Australia, advancing directly to the preliminary final.

Meanwhile, the Western Bulldogs had finished seventh with 15 wins and 7 losses following a season in which several key players suffered serious injuries, among them captain Bob Murphy, midfielder Mitch Wallis and forward Jack Redpath, while they were also without forward Stewart Crameri who was serving a season-long suspension for his role in his former club Essendon's controversial sports supplements program during the 2012 AFL season.

In 2016, the AFL had introduced a bye week before the finals series in an attempt to stop clubs resting players ahead of the finals. The move was met with mixed reactions across the clubs, but for the Bulldogs, it allowed the club's medical staff to work on helping Jack Macrae, Easton Wood and Tom Liberatore recover from various injuries. All three would play critical roles in the Bulldogs' quest for premiership glory.

The Bulldogs were drawn to play West Coast at Domain Stadium in the second elimination final. Despite having never previously won an interstate final, the Bulldogs defeated the previous year's Grand Finalists by 47 points, thus progressing to a semi-final against three-time defending premiers Hawthorn, which had lost its qualifying final against Geelong the previous week. The Bulldogs produced a strong second half to defeat the Hawks by 23 points and reach their first preliminary final since 2010, while also ending the Hawks' bid for a record-equalling fourth consecutive flag.

Going into this match, the Western Bulldogs had won four of the six matches played between the pair dating back to their first meeting in round five, 2012. The two teams met only once during the regular season, in round nine, with Greater Western Sydney winning by 25 points.

The winner of the preliminary final would progress to the Grand Final on 1 October, against the Sydney Swans, who had won the Second Preliminary Final^{N 1} the previous night.

Despite this only being their fifth season in the AFL, and missing 2007 Norm Smith Medallist Steve Johnson through suspension, Greater Western Sydney was the favourite to win the preliminary final and progress to the Grand Final. The Bulldogs, on the other hand, had lost nine of their previous ten preliminary finals, the most recent in 2010.

In the week leading up to the match, bookmakers were offering odds of $1.45 for a GWS victory and $2.85 for a Western Bulldogs victory.

== Match summary ==
In the lead-up to the game, there had been some controversy over the AFL's decision to play the match at Spotless Stadium due to its relatively small capacity. When member tickets were released for sale on the Monday (19 September) leading up to the game, Bulldog members had moved quickly, buying 8,100 tickets compared to 6,200 from Giants members. Further tickets for general admission were later made available, but there was initial frustration from supporters due to slow processing and "legalised scalping" via online ticket agencies. During the course of the week, several thousands of Bulldogs fans travelled up the Hume Highway from Melbourne to Sydney in cars and buses to attend the match.

=== First half ===
==== First quarter ====
After over five minutes of play, Greater Western Sydney registered the first score of the match, a behind to Dylan Shiel, before Clay Smith (Western Bulldogs) kicked the first goal of the match less than a minute later. Two goals to each side saw the Bulldogs lead by two points at the quarter-time break.

==== Second quarter ====
The Bulldogs then kicked four goals to three in the second quarter, during which two players suffered game-ending injuries: Bulldogs ruckman Jordan Roughead, who had a ball kicked in his face, and Giants co-captain Callan Ward, who was accidentally kneed in the head by Zaine Cordy. At half-time, the Bulldogs led by nine points.

=== Second half ===
==== Third quarter ====
Three minutes into the third quarter, Rory Lobb kicked a goal for the Giants to bring the margin back to one point, before a rushed behind brought the scores level at 41–apiece. However, Tory Dickson would kick a goal shortly after to give his side back the lead; another goal to Lobb and one to Jonathan Patton would see the Giants open up an eleven-point lead, before late goals to Marcus Bontempelli and Caleb Daniel saw the Giants' lead reduced to one point at three-quarter-time.

==== Final quarter ====
Two goals to the Giants to start the final quarter saw them take a 14-point lead, the biggest by any side during the match, before goals to Dickson, Bontempelli and Cordy saw the Bulldogs reclaim the lead. Shortly after, Patton would kick a goal for the Giants and with less than five minutes remaining, scores would be tied at 82–apiece. Jack Macrae, who to that point of the season had only kicked one goal, was then paid a mark inside the Bulldogs' forward 50 despite a late spoil from Nick Haynes; he then kicked the match's final goal and despite some desperation from the Giants, the Bulldogs would ultimately hang on to win by six points.

== Aftermath ==
By winning, the Western Bulldogs progressed to the 2016 AFL Grand Final the following week against the Sydney Swans. It was to be just their third appearance in a Grand Final, but first since 1961.

The Bulldogs ultimately went on to win their second flag, defeating the Swans by 22 points with Jason Johannisen winning the Norm Smith Medal as the best player on ground. They thus became the first team since Adelaide in 1997 to win four consecutive finals, as well as the first ever team to win the premiership after finishing seventh at the conclusion of the home-and-away season.

Subsequent meetings between the two sides saw the Giants won by two points in round six, 2017, by 48 points in round 21, 2017 and by 82 points in round one, 2018, before the Bulldogs won by 61 points in round 22, 2019, in what was their first match at the Sydney Showground Stadium since the 2016 preliminary final. The Giants, however, won their next finals meeting, defeating the Bulldogs by 58 points in the 2019 second elimination final to progress to a semi-final against the Brisbane Lions at the Gabba. The Giants would eventually reach the grand final, losing to Richmond by 89 points.

== Legacy ==
The match attracted an average television viewership of 2.387 million viewers across the Seven Network and Fox Footy, making it the second-most watched AFL game outside of a grand final ever and the most watched AFL game outside of a grand final since the 2007 preliminary final between Geelong and Collingwood. It was also considered by many fans to be the best AFL match played in the 2010s.

== Scorecard ==
First preliminary final
Saturday, 24 September (5:15 pm) | Greater Western Sydney | def. by | Western Bulldogs | Spotless Stadium (crowd: 21,790) | Report
2.1 (13); 5.2 (32); 9.7 (61); 12.11 (83) | Q1; Q2; Q3; Final | 2.3 (15); 6.5 (41); 9.6 (60); 13.11 (89) | Umpires: Mathew Nicholls, Justin Schmitt, Simon Meredith; Television broadcast: Seven Network, Fox Footy (simulcast)
4: Patton; 3: Greene, Lobb; 1: D. Smith, Shaw | Goals | 4: C. Smith, Dickson; 2: Cordy; 1: Daniel, Bontempelli, Macrae
Kelly, Scully, Patton, Coniglio, Wilson, Greene | Best | C. Smith, Dahlhaus, Dickson, Morris, Wood, Johannisen, Macrae, Picken
Ward (concussion) | Injuries | Roughead (eye)
Nil | Reports | Nil

== Teams ==
Greater Western Sydney
| B: | 20 Adam Tomlinson | 1 Phil Davis (c) | 19 Nick Haynes |
| HB: | 23 Heath Shaw | 24 Joel Patfull | 32 Ryan Griffen |
| C: | 29 Zac Williams | 3 Stephen Coniglio | 9 Tom Scully |
| HF: | 22 Josh Kelly | 18 Jeremy Cameron | 12 Jonathon Patton |
| F: | 7 Rhys Palmer | 37 Rory Lobb | 10 Devon Smith |
| Foll: | 41 Shane Mumford | 4 Toby Greene | 8 Callan Ward (c) |
| Int: | 2 Jacob Hopper | 5 Dylan Shiel | 6 Lachie Whitfield |
| Int: | 16 Nathan Wilson | | |
| Coach: | Leon Cameron | | |

Western Bulldogs
| B: | 39 Jason Johannisen | 30 Joel Hamling | 5 Matthew Boyd |
| HB: | 18 Fletcher Roberts | 38 Dale Morris | 10 Easton Wood (c) |
| C: | 7 Lachie Hunter | 4 Marcus Bontempelli | 42 Liam Picken |
| HF: | 20 Josh Dunkley | 12 Zaine Cordy | 9 Jake Stringer |
| F: | 29 Tory Dickson | 17 Tom Boyd | 14 Clay Smith |
| Foll: | 23 Jordan Roughead | 6 Luke Dahlhaus | 21 Tom Liberatore |
| Int: | 11 Jack Macrae | 16 Toby McLean | 24 Shane Biggs |
| Int: | 35 Caleb Daniel | | |
| Coach: | Luke Beveridge | | |

== See also ==
- Greater Western Sydney–Western Bulldogs rivalry
- 2016 AFL season

== Footnotes ==
1. The First and Second Preliminary Finals are named based on the teams competing in them, not based on the chronological order in which they take place. See AFL finals system for more information.
