= Rivalries in the Australian Football League =

Rivalries in the Australian Football League exist between many teams, most of which typically draw large crowds and interest regardless of both teams' positions on the ladder. The AFL encourages the building of such rivalries, as a method of increasing publicity for the league.

== Victorian rivalries ==
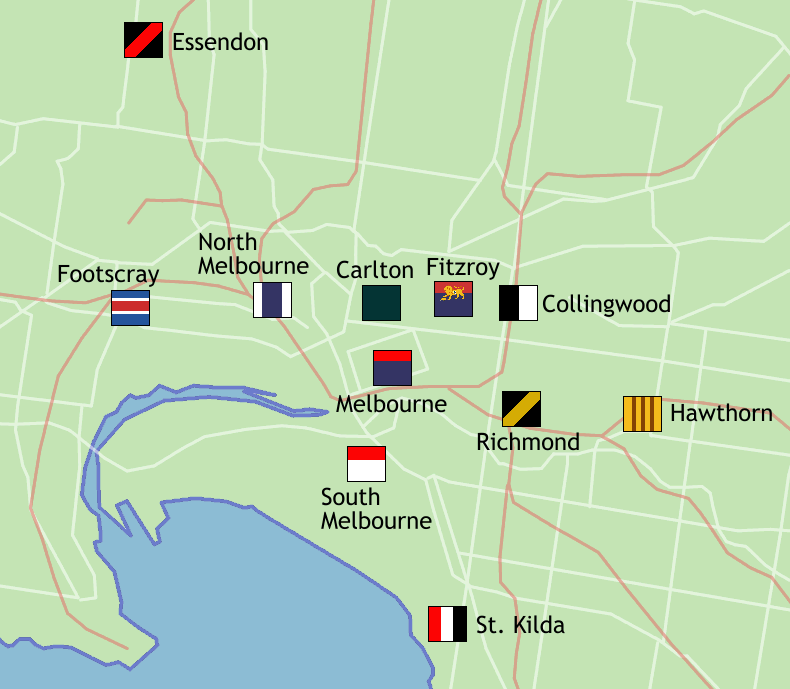
Locations of AFL teams in Melbourne between 1922 and 1965

=== Carlton v Collingwood ===
Two clubs in close proximity, fueled by the traditional rivalry between white collar Carlton and blue collar Collingwood. Games between these two clubs in the home and away season, finals or preseason tend to have large numbers of spectators.

=== Melbourne v Collingwood ===
A traditional white collar (Melbourne) v blue collar (Collingwood) rivalry, additionally fuelled by a loss to Collingwood which stopped Melbourne from winning a fourth flag in a row in 1958 and Melbourne restricting Collingwood to 14 points in the 1960 grand final. Six of Melbourne's thirteen premierships came against Collingwood and the teams have met in seven grand finals, the most of any pairing. Since 2001, Melbourne has hosted Collingwood in an annual match at the MCG on the King's Birthday public holiday Monday in June.

=== Richmond v Collingwood ===
Arising from the fact that the two areas neighbour each other, Richmond and Collingwood were both highly successful in the late 1920s to the early 1930s; the clubs played against each other in five grand finals between 1919 and 1929 (Collingwood won in 1919, 1927, 1928 and 1929, while Richmond won in 1920). In the 1980 Grand Final, Richmond handed Collingwood an 81-point defeat, a record at the time, causing Collingwood to lose an 8th Grand Finals in a row.

Both clubs continue to draw large crowds to their meetings in each season, and the two were the subject of a 'recruiting war' throughout the 1970s and 1980s, with David Cloke, Geoff Raines, Brian Taylor, Wally Lovett, Phillip Walsh, Steven Roach, Gerald Betts, Neil Peart, Peter McCormack, Kevin Morris, Craig Stewart, Ross Brewer, Michael Lockman, Rod Oborne, Allan Edwards, John Annear, Noel Lovell and Bob Heard all exchanging clubs, as well as coach Tom Hafey (moving to Collingwood in 1977 following four flags at Punt Road).

Melees have been fought between the teams in two recent matches—Round 20, 2009, and Round 2, 2012—with almost all players from both teams involved in the altercations.

Both teams played each other 3 times during 2018, with all three games attracting massive crowds. Crowds of 72,157 and 88,180 were recorded between both home-and-away games, with Richmond winning both times, until Collingwood unexpectedly pulled off a massive upset in their finals game, smashing Richmond in the preliminary final in front of a crowd of 94,959, which caused the rivalry to reach its highest point since 1980. Games between these two clubs regularly attract large crowds regardless of whether they are in finals contention or not.

=== Hawthorn v Essendon ===
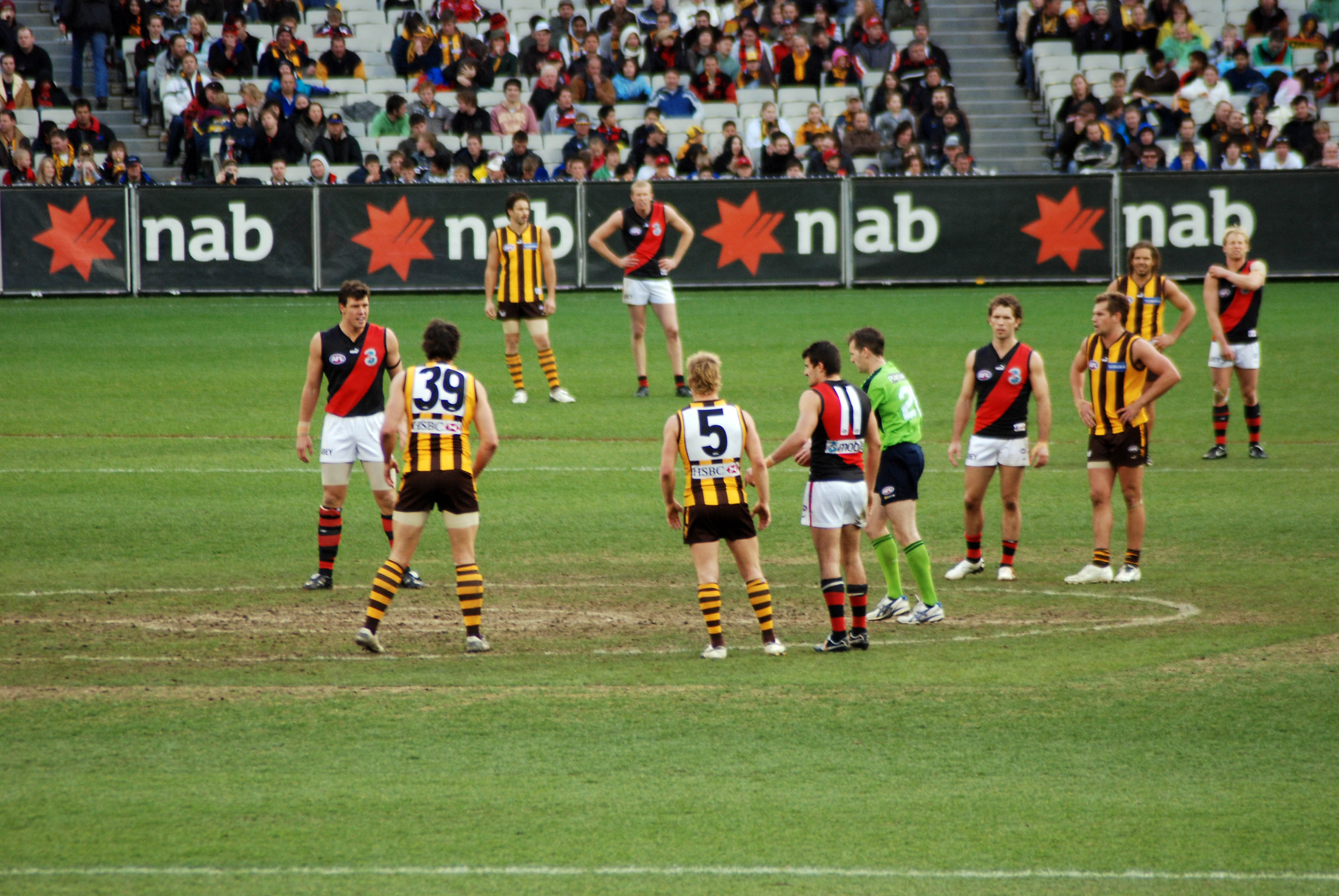
Games between the Hawks and the Bombers have proved spectacular due to wild brawls that have their roots in the 1980s

The clubs contested the grand final in three consecutive seasons between 1983 and 1985, and the rough nature of these games and other matches between the clubs made them strong rivals during the 1980s. In 1992, Hawthorn inflicted a record MCG score of 32.24 (216) against Essendon. In the 2000s, the clubs played two matches which saw bench-clearing brawls: the infamous "Line in the Sand Match" in 2004, which resulted in four players being suspended and a record $70,000 in fines; and the final round of 2009, a match which would decide eighth place between the two teams, in which four players were suspended for a total of seven matches and $27,000 in fines were handed out. The latter brawl was famously sparked by Matthew Lloyd, who applied a very hard bump that knocked out Brad Sewell in what would be Lloyd's last game.

=== Hawthorn v Geelong ===
The rivalry between these two clubs is noted as creating a propensity for close matches, with a number of well-known, controversial incidents arising from this rivalry. The AFL has a lock on fixturing a match between these two teams on Easter Monday at the MCG.

==== History ====
===== Bruns incident =====
While Hawthorn and Geelong had previously played against each other in several high-profile matches, including the 1963 Grand Final, the rivalry between the two teams is widely held to have begun in their round 12 match during the 1985 season. During the match, Hawthorn star Leigh Matthews struck Geelong player Neville Bruns in the jaw, breaking it and causing Bruns to miss five games. Matthews was deregistered by the AFL for a month for the incident, and became the only player in the history of the VFL/AFL to be charged with criminal offences for an act committed on-field. He was given a $1000 fine, which was overturned on appeal. The incident caused both players to be booed by fans of the opposing teams for the rest of their careers.

===== 1989 grand final =====
The 1989 grand final, contested between the two clubs, was what solidified their rivalry. The game, noted for its extreme brutality, is widely considered one of the best Grand Finals in VFL/AFL history. Earlier in the season, Hawthorn's Dermott Brereton had damaged one of Mark Yeates's testicles during a tackle. Within seconds of the game starting, Brereton was flattened by a bump from Yeates. He proceeded to get up, vomit, and continued to play. This was one of many examples of Geelong 'playing the man', resulting in major injuries for several Hawks players during the game. Hawthorn controlled the game, leading by approximately 40 points for most of the match; in the last quarter, Geelong almost managed to come from behind to win, but fell short by six points.

===== 2008 grand final =====
In the 2008 AFL Grand Final, Geelong was the heavily backed favourite and had lost only one match for the season, but Hawthorn upset Geelong by 26 points; Geelong won its next eleven matches against Hawthorn over the following five years, under a curse, which was dubbed the "Kennett curse" which was attributed to disrespectful comments made by Hawthorn president Jeff Kennett following the 2008 Grand Final. It was later revealed that after the 2008 grand final, Paul Chapman initiated a pact between other Geelong players to never lose to Hawthorn again. The curse was broken in a preliminary final in 2013, after Paul Chapman played his final match for Geelong the previous week.

=== Essendon v Collingwood ===
Since 1995, the rivalry has been defined by the Anzac Day clash; a match generally draws a crowd in excess of 90,000. The inaugural Anzac Day Clash in 1995 was famously drawn in front of 94,825 fans, the 2009 match was won by Essendon in the final minute with a goal from youngster David Zaharakis, and the 2012 match was won by Collingwood by one point after Jarryd Blair's game-winning goal was reviewed by video replay before being awarded.

=== North Melbourne v Essendon ===
The rivalry between North Melbourne and Essendon in the AFL can be traced back to 1896, when several clubs, including Essendon, broke away from the Victorian Football Association (VFA) to form the Victorian Football League (VFL). The two clubs almost amalgamated in 1921 when Essendon, evicted from its home ground at East Melbourne, sought to move to North Melbourne's home at Arden Street, a move which was blocked by the VFA.

North Melbourne in particular has a long-standing resentment against Essendon, with Essendon traditionally the wealthier of the two clubs, which in the pre-salary cap era (before 1982), would often buy North Melbourne's best players on higher salaries. North also resented Essendon using its greater wealth and influence to dominate contested junior recruitment zones - North always claiming that while Essendon had more money and administrative power, the Kangaroos had ‘Shinboner Spirit’, a reference to the club's more working-class roots and refusal to give in under adversity.

North Melbourne was finally admitted into the VFL in 1925. In 1950, the two sides met in their first and only grand final meeting to date, which Essendon won by 38 points. The rivalry flared in the 1980s. In 1982, the Krakouer brothers, Jim and Phil, led the Roos to an elimination final win. Essendon had their revenge a year later, winning a preliminary final by 86 points.

The rivalry was reignited in the late 1990s and early 2000s due to the onfield success of the two sides. In preparation for the 1998 finals series, and despite losing six of their last eight to the Roos, Essendon coach Kevin Sheedy publicly labelled North executives Greg Miller and Mark Dawson as "soft" in response to comments from commentators that his Essendon team was soft. The Kangaroos beat Essendon in the much-hyped qualifying final that followed, with North fans throwing Marshmallows at Sheedy as he left the ground. Sheedy was seemingly unfazed by the incident, encouraging a "Marshmallow Game" the next year and relishing in the fact that Sheedy's ulterior motive was to build up the game and draw a large crowd, which proved to be correct, drawing in 71,154 people to attend the game. In 2000, the Bombers thrashed North Melbourne by 125 points in a qualifying final, while the biggest VFL/AFL comeback of all time occurred between the two teams when Essendon managed to come back from a 69-point deficit to win by 12 points in 2001. The last time the two teams met in a final (as of 2026), was in the 2014 AFL finals series in the 2nd Elimination Final which resulted in North winning by 12 points, a 45-point turnaround from Essendon's 33 point lead early in the third quarter.

=== Essendon v Richmond ===
A rivalry born out of that the two clubs are both part of the "Big 4" clubs in Melbourne as the highly supported teams. Since 2005, Essendon and Richmond have contested the annual Dreamtime at the 'G match, a celebration of Aboriginal players and their contribution to the league, typically held near the midway point of the season. These games usually tend to get a crowd of 80,000 or above.

=== North Melbourne v Hawthorn ===
Both teams entered the VFL in the 1925 expansion, and were generally unsuccessful through their first few decades, but the two teams were both very strong through the 1970s, sparking a rivalry between the clubs. The clubs played three Grand Finals against each other in four years, with North Melbourne winning their first-ever premiership in 1975 by 55 points, Hawthorn winning in 1976 by five goals, and Hawthorn winning again in 1978 by three goals.

Melees were fought between the two teams in matches in both 2014 and 2015, with almost all players in both teams involved in the altercations.

=== Essendon v Carlton ===
The two clubs share the record for the most premierships with 16, with the clubs meeting in six grand finals (with each team having won three flags against the other) including a 1-point victory by Carlton against Essendon in 1947 and a drought-breaking flag in 1968 in which Carlton became the first team to have kicked fewer goals than the loser.

In 1981 the clubs would meet in the Escort cup grand final which Essendon would win. Later on in the season in Round 20 in 1981, with Carlton leading by 26 points with 10 minutes left to play, with goals from Neale Danniher helping get the Bombers across the line by 1 point. The game is most famous for Carlton skipper Mike Fitzpatrick having the ball taken off him for wasting time. In 1993 Carlton and Essendon met in quite a few memorable affairs, including the 1993 Grand Final in which the Bombers won the game by 44 points. Carlton famously upset the heavily favoured Essendon side by 1 point in the 1999 Preliminary Final.

In 2007 Essendon led Carlton by 48 points deep into the second quarter of their Round 3 2007 match at the Melbourne Cricket Ground (MCG), only to be overrun by Carlton in what would go down as their greatest ever come from behind victory; however, Essendon went on to defeat Carlton over the next 6 encounters, with Carlton finally breaking Essendon's winning streak with an emphatic 76 point win in Round 19, 2010.

Following the 2000 Preliminary final the two teams would not meet in a final until the 2011 Elimination Final and would be Carlton's first finals win in 10 years. In 2018 after Carlton's worst start to the season in the club's 121 years in the competition, the Blues would secure their first win for the season in Round 8 against Essendon.

=== Richmond v Carlton ===
A rivalry based on geographical proximity and large supporter bases, the rivalry intensified as both clubs contested several grand finals between 1969 and 1982, including the 1972 Grand Final where Richmond equalled the highest score ever in a grand final, only to be bettered by Carlton in the same match. The following year Richmond won the 1973 Grand Final in an even more physically bitter contest than in recent encounters between the two sides; Carlton got their revenge in 1982 by defeating Richmond in their last grand final appearance until their win over Adelaide in 2017. In 2013, Carlton beat Richmond by 20 points in an elimination final, which was Richmond's first final since 2001, and third final since 1982.

Since 2008, the two clubs have met annually on a Thursday night in Round 1 of each season at the Melbourne Cricket Ground. The men's season opener was also replicated in the 2020 AFL Women's season, which also doubled as Richmond's inaugural AFL Women's match, though was held at IKON Park rather than the Melbourne Cricket Ground.

A record crowd of 94,690 attended the 2013 Elimination Final between these two traditional rivals. It was the largest crowd for the 2013 season excluding the grand final, and the largest week one finals crowd since 1972.

Games between these two clubs regularly attract large crowds regardless of whether they are in finals contention or not.

== Non-Victorian rivalries ==
=== Essendon v West Coast ===
A three-decade rivalry between the Essendon Bombers and the West Coast Eagles started when Essendon coach Kevin Sheedy tied the windsock down on the School End outer terrace so the opposition would not know which way the wind was blowing. Sheedy later said of the incident three decades later, in jest, that it was because the brand sponsor had neglected to pay their account. When West Coast won the toss and kicked against the breeze, it looked as if Sheedy's plan had worked. Nevertheless, West Coast would go on to win by 7 points.

In his excitement at winning a close match in Round 16, 1993, with ruckman and forward Paul Salmon kicking a goal 30 seconds before the final siren against the West Coast Eagles (the reigning premiers), Sheedy waved his jacket in the air as he came rushing from the coaches' box. To this day, the supporters of the winning club wave their jackets in the air after the game when the two teams play. The moment is captured in Jamie Cooper's painting the Game That Made Australia, commissioned by the AFL in 2008 to celebrate the 150th anniversary of the sport, with Sheedy shown waving a red, black and yellow jacket rather than a red and black jacket, to reflect Sheedy's support of indigenous footballers. The Bombers would go on to defeat West Coast again later that year in their semi-final clash and take home the 1993 premiership cup a couple of weeks later.

Despite Sheedy's typically measured disposition, Sheedy did lose his cool on one occasion in 2000. In yet another game against the Eagles, Sheedy was fined $7,500 by the tribunal after making a cut-throat gesture to then-Eagle Mitchell White during the half-time break of the Essendon–West Coast clash in Round 15, 2000, also apparently mouthing the words "You... are... fucked!" to White.

In a famous game in 2004, with 35 seconds remaining and the scores deadlocked at 131 points apiece, Essendon legend James Hird swooped on a loose ball in the right forward pocket and snapped a match-winning goal with his 15th possession for the quarter, famously hugging an Essendon supporter in the crowd in a moment of jubilation after being fined $20,000 earlier in the week for criticising umpire Scott McLaren. Full-forward Matthew Lloyd also kicked eight goals during the game to net three Brownlow votes. Despite Hird's incredible individual effort, and to the consternation of fans and the audience of the 2004 Brownlow medal count, he did not receive any Brownlow Medal votes from the umpires for his 34 disposals and clutch goals, which some have speculated was in retribution for his tirade against umpire McLaren.

=== Western Bulldogs v Greater Western Sydney ===
A rivalry between the Western Bulldogs and Greater Western Sydney has emerged in recent years.

The rivalry first started when Bulldogs captain Ryan Griffen controversially requested a trade to the Giants after the 2014 AFL season. The Bulldogs responded by luring the Giants' no. 1 draft pick, first-year key forward Tom Boyd, on a 7-year deal worth $7 million. Griffen and Boyd were ultimately exchanged in the same trade deal.

The two teams then met in the 2016 AFL First Preliminary Final, in which the Bulldogs were attempting to make their first AFL grand final appearance in 55 years while the Giants were attempting to reach the grand final for the first time in their fifth season in the AFL. The Bulldogs won the match by six points and would later go on to win the premiership the following week, with Boyd named among the Bulldogs' best.

The rivalry was further exacerbated by an incident in Round 21, 2017, in which Giants small forward Toby Greene collected Bulldog Luke Dahlhaus in the face with his foot while flying for a handball receive. Greene avoided suspension for the incident.

Since then, the Giants have had a slight edge in matches against the Bulldogs, winning four of their last seven matches up to the end of the 2021 season. It wasn't until Round 22 of the 2019 season that the Bulldogs would defeat the Giants again, winning by 61 points after they had trailed by 15 points at one stage in the match. It was also the first time the two teams played each other at the GIANTS stadium since the 2016 preliminary final. Twenty days later, the Giants would get their revenge, defeating the Bulldogs in a fierce and at times violent contest by 58 points in the second elimination final to progress to a semi-final against the Brisbane Lions at the Gabba and end the Bulldogs' season.

=== Port Adelaide v Hawthorn ===
While an initial rivalry can be traced back to the 2014 Preliminary Final where a 5th place Port Adelaide lost by only 3 points to the Hawks (who would go on to win their second of three grand finals in a row), the present-day rivalry took off following Port Adelaide's 41-point comeback against the Hawks in 2024 where Willie Rioli and Darcy Byrne-Jones would both kick goals in the last 30 seconds to hand Port Adelaide a 1-point win.

In that same season, the two clubs would meet again for a semi-final following Port Adelaide's 84 point defeat to Geelong at the Adelaide Oval in a qualifying final. This is while Hawthorn were coming off an upset elimination final win against the Western Bulldogs, meaning the Hawks were the slight favourites to send Port out in straight sets for the second consecutive season. A set shot from James Sicily hit the post in the dying minutes of the match which would see the Power win 11.9 (75) to 11.6 (72). Following the match, Port Adelaide coach Ken Hinkley would be fined $20,000 for forming his hands in an aeroplane shape, which was directed at Jack Ginnivan for a comment left on a Sydney Swans Instagram post celebrating their qualifying final win saying: 'see u in 14 days'. Hinkley said after the game that it was to tell him 'you aren't going anywhere.' The match would be later voted in a fan survey conducted by afl.com.au as the best game of the season.

For the 2025 AFL season, it was announced that the two teams would face off as the closing match of the annual Gather Round, which is hosted in Adelaide. Port would enter the match 1–3, while Hawthorn were 4-0 and sitting 1st on the ladder. It was expected Hawthorn would comfortably win against a weak Port side. Much to the shock of many, Port would get to a 70-point lead near the end of the second quarter, before the Hawks would work the margin back to 30. The teams would play again later in the season, where Hawthorn would win by 38 points.

Hinkley's departure from Port Adelaide would symbolise the end of the rivalry, as the AFL scaled back the clubs meetings to one in the 2026 AFL season (which Hawthorn would win by three points).

In 2026, Hinkley spoke on SEN where he said that he was "shamed and exploited" in regards to his $20,000 fine from the Semi-Final and then the later marketing of the incident for Gather Round.

=== Sydney v West Coast ===
A rivalry between the Sydney Swans and the West Coast Eagles developed during the first decade of the 2000s due to an unusually high number of close games, many in finals. The teams met each other six times between September 2005 and March 2007, including both Grand Finals and two Qualifying Finals; the final margins of these games were: 4, 4, 2, 1, 1 and 1, with Sydney winning the 2005 Grand Final after a 72-year drought—which was the longest gap between premierships in VFL/AFL history—and West Coast winning the 2006 Grand Final. The sum of margins of 13 points across six consecutive meetings is by far the narrowest in VFL/AFL history, with 28 points (South Melbourne vs Melbourne, 28 points, 1898–1900) the nearest challenger for six consecutive games. In Round 4, 2008, the era of consistently close games came to an end when the Swans smashed the Eagles by 62 points. Twenty seasons after the dramatic 2005 Grand Final, 6x All Australian West Coast Ruckman Dean Cox commenced a career as the head coach of the Sydney Swans, taking over from long serving coach John Longmire at the end of 2024.

== Local derbies ==
There are four "local derbies" in the AFL, with each of the clubs competing against their cross-town rivals at least twice every year.

=== Western Derby: Fremantle v West Coast ===
The two Western Australian-based teams contest the Western Derby. The West Coast Eagles won the first nine derbies, stretching from the inaugural derby in May 1995 until July 1999, but the Fremantle Dockers managed a seven-match consecutive winning streak in derby matches, commencing in August 2007 and ending in May 2011. Of the 56 derbies played, West Coast holds a 33–23 advantage. The best-performing player in each Western Derby is awarded the Glendinning–Allan Medal.

=== Showdown: Adelaide v Port Adelaide ===
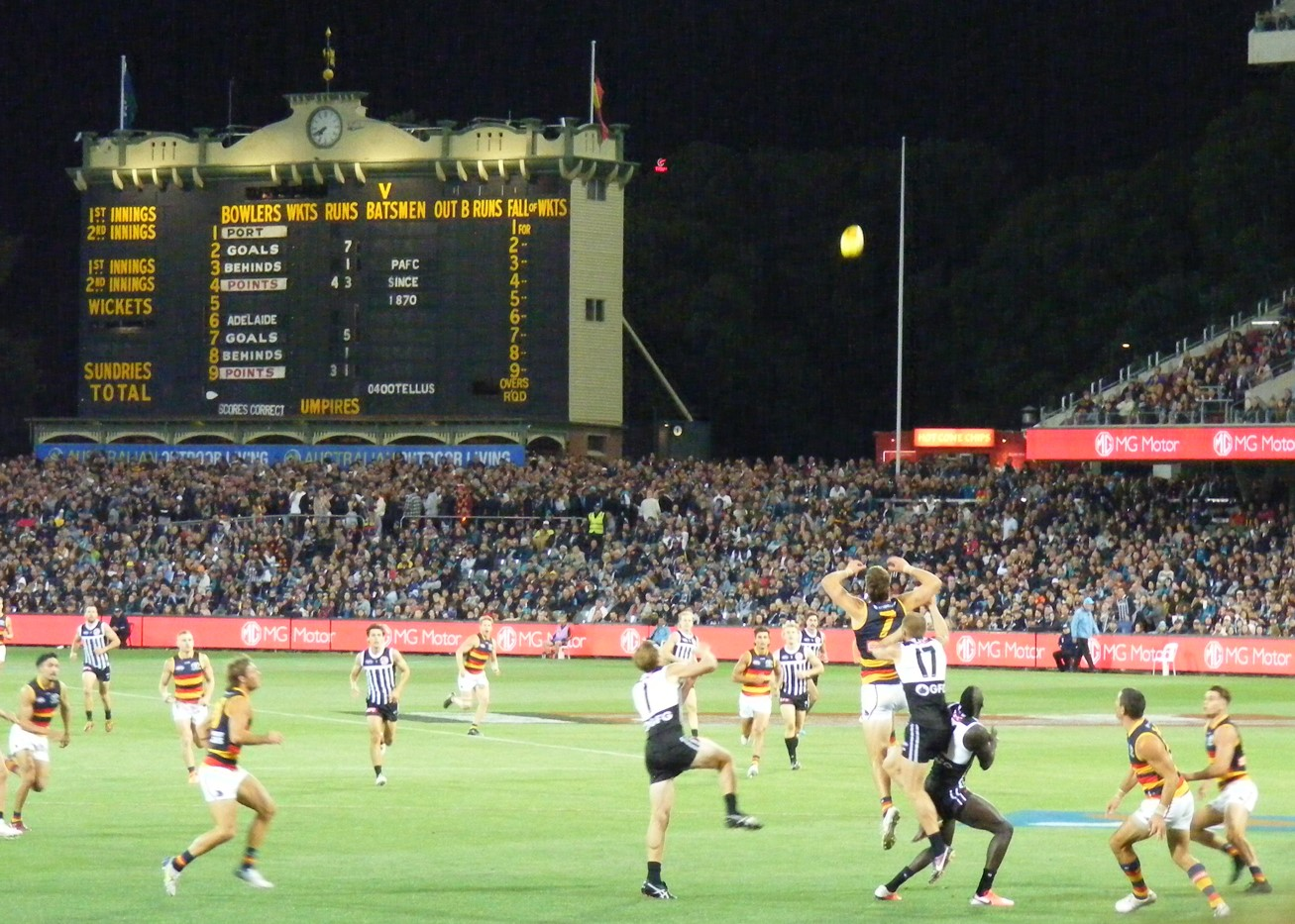
Showdown 53.

The two teams based in South Australia, the Adelaide Crows and the Port Adelaide, contest the Showdown. The first Showdown occurred in April 1997, following the introduction of Port Adelaide into the league that year. Of the 57 Showdowns that have been contested, Adelaide lead with 29 wins to Port Adelaides 28 wins. The best-performing player in each Showdown is awarded the Showdown Medal. Following the death of the Adelaide's coach and assistant coach of Port Adelaide for 11 years, Phil Walsh, the Showdown Medal was renamed after Walsh for this year to commemorate his life. It was the highest-attended game between the two teams, and the lowest-ever margin. Adelaide won 116–113. This rivalry is now shared in both the AFLW and SANFL, with Adelaide winning 3 of 3 AFLW Showdowns and, of the 22 SANFL Showdowns, Adelaide leading with 12 wins to Port Adelaides 10 wins.

=== QClash: Brisbane v Gold Coast ===
The QClash is a derby between the only two Queensland clubs. The Gold Coast Suns won the first QClash, held in 2011, by eight points, but the Brisbane Lions have dominated the rivalry, leading the head-to-head tally 18–7 as of the end of the 2023 season. The best-performing player in each QClash is awarded the Marcus Ashcroft Medal. The QClash was contested in finals for the first time in 2025, in the Second Semi Final hosted at the Gabba. Eventual back to back Premiers, the Brisbane Lions, defeated the Gold Coast Suns by 53 points. Gold Coast's 2025 finals campaign was their first in club history.

=== Sydney Derby: Greater Western Sydney v Sydney ===
The Sydney Derby is the most recent local derby in the AFL, following the introduction of Greater Western Sydney in the 2012 AFL season. The best-performing player in each Derby during the home and away season is awarded the Brett Kirk Medal, with both teams competing for the Lifeline Cup. The Sydney Swans have a clear 20–11 advantage over the Giants. The Giants did not win their first Derby until 2014, after which point, both sides were fairly evenly matched until 2023. Between the 2019 and 2023 seasons, GWS's four victories over Sydney were by a combined total of six points (2, 2, 1 and 1). From 2023 onwards, the Swans went on a record run of 5 consecutive Derby wins. Despite being the youngest cross town rivalry, the Sydney Derby has produced four finals clashes, more than any of the other three Interstate Derbies. In finals, the Giants have a 3-1 winning record, having comprehensively won finals in 2016 and 2018 in Qualifying Final 1 and Elimination Final 2 respectively. Since then, the Sydney Swans have lost finals against GWS by a single point in 2021's Elimination Final 2 before ultimately achieving a 6-point come from behind win in 2024's Qualifying Final 1. The victory was Sydney's first Derby win in finals.

== Overall head-to-head results ==
All clubs head-to-head win percentages. Includes all matches in the VFL/AFL. Correct to the end of Round 3 of the 2021 AFL season. *Does not include Brisbane Bears.

Team (Across)/Opp	Ade	Bri*	Car	Col	Ess	Fit	Fre	Gee	GC	GWS	Haw	Mel	NM	PA	Ric	StK	Syd	Uni	WB	WCE	Avg
Ade		50.00	52.5	35.23	47.50	66.67	57.50	44.68	93.33	76.92	46.51	60.98	51.11	50.00	62.50	63.33	58.14		45.65	42.86	52.97
Bri*	50.00		54.29	55.88	48.44		48.28	40.54	68.42	36.36	48.57	56.67	47.44	50.00	28.79	54.55	35.53		50.00	35.29	47.37
Car	47.50	45.71		49.81	51.41	62.18	44.44	53.85	61.54	30.00	61.31	55.61	62.42	40.91	56.50	73.87	57.83	92.86	61.07	45.65	57.44
Col	64.77	44.12	50.19		55.83	63.40	59.38	56.99	80.00	54.55	59.04	63.81	67.28	50.00	56.60	72.85	62.94	96.43	69.50	47.32	60.92
Ess	52.50	51.56	48.59	44.17		58.12	62.16	53.65	77.27	54.55	60.00	60.65	63.84	42.42	51.96	66.82	59.87	85.71	58.64	52.73	56.46
Fit	33.33		37.82	36.60	41.88		25.00	43.44			45.26	50.00	48.83		43.37	57.65	57.30	75.00	42.86	40.00	45.72
Fre	42.50	51.72	55.56	40.63	37.84	75.00		32.50	63.64	54.55	24.32	57.50	43.75	44.74	42.11	45.95	45.83		48.48	39.22	44.02
Gee	55.32	59.46	46.15	43.01	46.35	56.56	67.50		83.33	68.18	55.06	60.73	61.52	67.14	53.28	60.88	55.31	57.14	64.20	49.07	54.98
GC	6.67	31.58	38.46	20.00	22.73		36.36	16.67		28.57	15.38	21.43	50.00	8.33	30.00	28.57	18.18		25.00	19.23	24.77
GWS	23.08	63.64	70.00	45.45	45.45		45.45	31.82	71.43		45.00	42.86	30.00	54.55	35.71	45.83	36.84		46.15	25.00	44.20
Haw	53.49	51.43	38.69	40.96	40.00	54.74	75.68	44.94	84.62	55.00		52.73	55.93	44.44	44.10	52.53	55.95		51.53	45.28	49.28
Mel	39.02	43.33	44.39	36.19	39.35	50.00	42.50	39.27	78.57	57.14	47.27		52.45	37.14	43.23	56.65	44.76	78.57	52.99	31.48	45.58
NM	48.89	52.56	37.58	32.72	36.16	51.17	56.25	38.48	50.00	70.00	44.07	47.55		59.46	45.96	50.93	45.43		49.09	43.14	44.64
PA	50.00	50.00	59.09	50.00	57.58		55.26	32.86	91.67	45.45	55.56	62.86	40.54		57.35	64.52	35.48		54.84	55.56	52.72
Ric	37.50	71.21	43.50	43.40	48.04	56.63	57.89	46.72	70.00	64.29	55.90	56.77	54.04	42.65		60.90	55.30	64.29	51.92	42.22	51.76
StK	36.67	45.45	26.13	27.15	33.18	42.35	54.05	39.12	71.43	54.17	47.47	43.35	49.07	35.48	39.10		36.47	57.14	52.45	37.00	39.47
Syd	41.86	64.47	42.17	37.06	40.13	42.70	54.17	44.69	81.82	63.16	44.05	55.24	54.57	64.52	44.70	63.53		92.86	48.46	57.69	48.06
Uni			7.14	3.57	14.29	25.00		42.86				21.43			35.71	42.86	7.14				22.22
WB	54.35	50.00	38.93	30.50	41.36	57.14	51.52	35.80	75.00	53.85	48.47	47.01	50.91	45.16	48.08	47.55	51.54			35.96	45.71
WCE	57.14	64.71	54.35	52.68	47.27	60.00	60.78	50.93	80.77	75.00	54.72	68.52	56.86	44.44	57.78	63.00	42.31		64.04		57.32

== See also ==
- List of individual match awards in the Australian Football League
- Rivalries in the National Rugby League
