= Jack Macrae =

Australian rules footballer (born 1994)

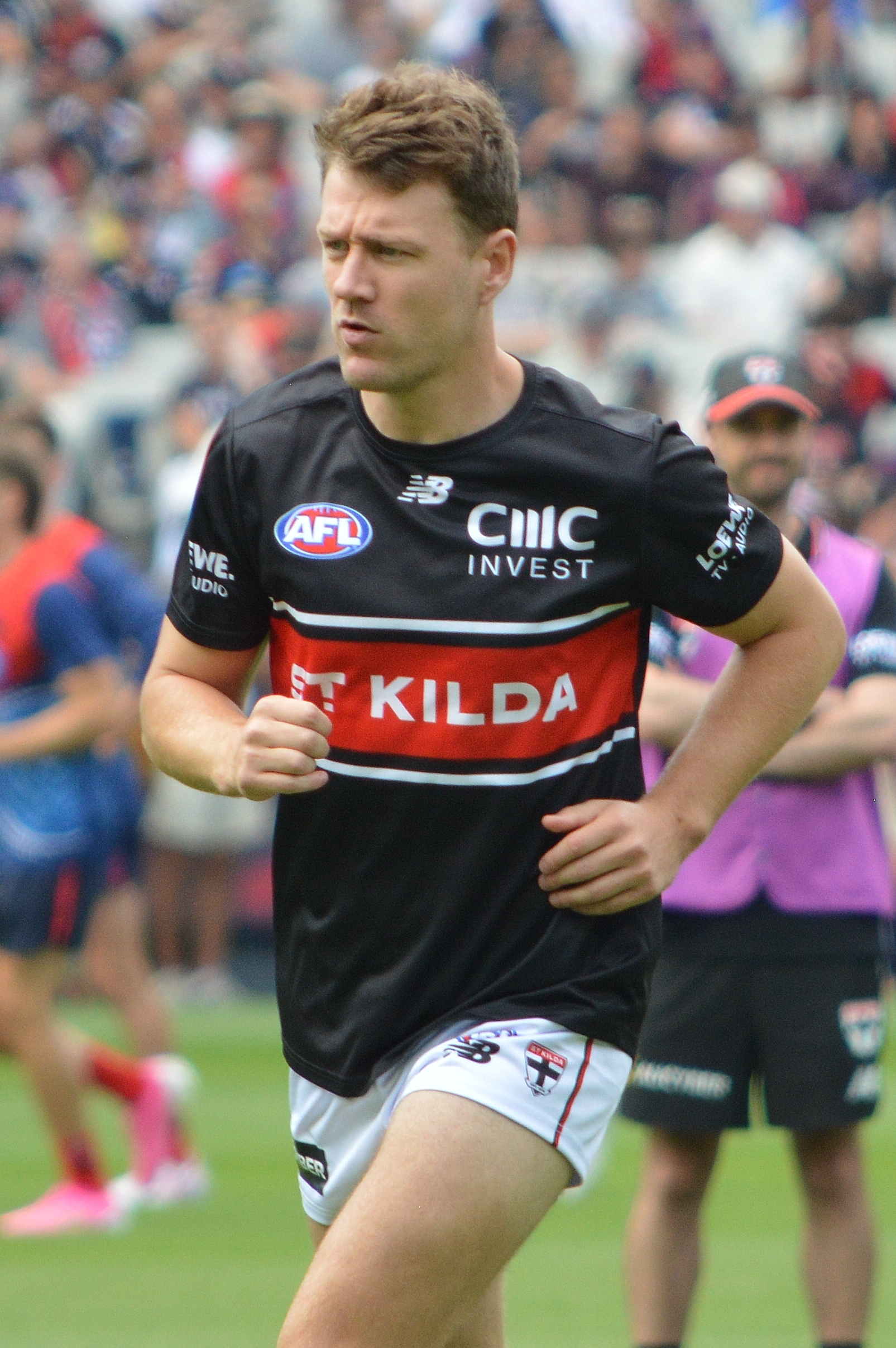
- Macrae with St Kilda in March 2026

Personal information
- Full name: Jackson Macrae
- Nicknames: Jacko, Nator
- Born: 3 August 1994 (age 32)
- Original teams: Oakleigh Chargers (TAC Cup), Carey Baptist Grammar School (APS)
- Draft: No. 6, 2012 Draft (Western Bulldogs)
- Height: 192 cm (6 ft 4 in)
- Weight: 88 kg (194 lb)
- Position: Midfielder

Club information
- Current club: St Kilda
- Number: 6

Playing career^{1}
Years	Club	Games (Goals)
2013–2024	Western Bulldogs	249 (59)
2025–	St Kilda	33 (1)
Total		282 (60)

Representative team honours
Years	Team	Games (Goals)
2020	Victoria	1 (0)
- ^{1} Playing statistics correct to the end of the 2026 season.

Career highlights
- AFL premiership player (2016); 3x All-Australian (2019, 2020, 2021); Gary Ayres Award (2021); AFL Rising Star nominee (2013)

Jackson Macrae (born 3 August 1994) is a professional Australian rules footballer playing for the St Kilda Football Club in the Australian Football League (AFL). He previously played for the Western Bulldogs Football Club. At 191 cm (6 ft 3 in) tall and 85 kg (187 lb), He plays as a ball-winning midfielder who can play on the inside or as a running outside midfielder. He grew up in Kew, Victoria while attending Carey Baptist Grammar School, where he won the best and fairest award while playing for their top team. He played top-level junior football with the Oakleigh Chargers in the NAB League and Vic Metro in the AFL Under 18 Championships. He previously played for the Western Bulldogs from 2013 to 2024 and was in the 2016 premiership team.

Macrae was drafted with the sixth selection in the 2012 AFL draft. He made his debut the following year in 2013. He received a nomination for the 2013 AFL Rising Star award in round 8 of the 2013 season. Since then, he has been an AFL Premiership player, three-time All-Australian midfielder, three-time Doug Hawkins Medallist, two-time Gary Dempsey Medallist and a Gary Ayres Medallist. He has polled a total of 106 Brownlow Medal votes in his career, and holds the all-time league record for most disposals in a season.

== Early life and career ==
Macrae is the second son to father David and mother Rosie. He was a Hawthorn supporter growing up. He played junior football for the Kew Rovers in the Yarra Junior Football League.

Macrae attended secondary school at Carey Baptist Grammar School, with future AFL players such as Jack Viney and Nathan Hrovat. Macrae was not selected to play for the Oakleigh Chargers in his bottom age year, meaning he had to continue playing school football. After having flown under the radar, excitement grew around Macrae after he began to rapidly improve. He hired former Carlton player Ian Aitken to improve his kicking technique after he completed Year 11, which he said helped him become a 'more damaging kick'. While playing for his school, Carey Baptist Grammar School, he was coached by former North Melbourne player David King; under his guidance Macrae won the best and fairest for the team despite being around 4 future AFL draftees.

When he gets the ball, he changes the speed of the game, the angles of the game and always bites off the harder option… I think he'll be an outstanding half-forward flank with really good lateral moves. He'll definitely play 100 games and I'd be staggered if he didn't play in 2013… For me, it's his ability to baulk and embarrass players.

— David King (Australian rules footballer)

Macrae was selected to play for the Oakleigh Chargers in the NAB League in 2012, and quickly became an integral part of their team. While playing for the Chargers, Macrae averaged 24.5 disposals, 15.7 kicks, 8.8 handballs, 5.2 marks and 2.1 tackles out of his 12 games with the Chargers. Becoming one of the Chargers' best junior finals players, he was named as one of the team's best on ground in multiple finals. In Oakleigh's 46-point semi-finals win against the Dandenong Stingrays in September 2012, he was named as one of the team's best players that game. He was then named best on ground in the Chargers' 83-point preliminary final demolition of the North Ballarat Rebels, where he kicked 3 goals. Finally, he was named as the most valuable player in the team's thrilling 1-point victory over the Gippsland Power in the grand final, where he kicked a crucial behind to secure the team's premiership trophy. He was named as the Oakleigh Chargers' best finals player, after averaging 28 disposals a game during the finals series, and came third in the club's best and fairest count with 68 votes, 15 votes away from obtaining first place.

He was also selected to play for Vic Metro in the AFL Under 18 Championships, where he played every game. He cemented his reputation as a dangerous player and boosted his draft chances after a six-goal game against Tasmania, including four goals in one quarter, claiming the best on ground title for that match. He averaged 19.4 disposals a game, at a 78.4% efficiency rate. Despite his consistent performances, he missed out on making the Under 18 All Australian team.

Macrae was predicted to be taken anywhere in the 2012 AFL draft between pick 6 and pick 13. He was recruited to the Bulldogs with the sixth selection in the 2012 AFL draft, one pick behind future premiership forward Jake Stringer.

== AFL career ==
=== 2013–2015: Early career ===
Before debut, Macrae gained muscle and improved his fitness in order to improve his chances of selection, stating "You have to earn your right to play senior footy and first of all you have got to train well and prepare well." Macrae made his debut for the Western Bulldogs in Round 4 of the 2013 AFL season against Adelaide. On his debut, Macrae kicked his first goal, and also collected 16 disposals, 4 tackles and 3 clearances. Macrae was awarded the round 8 nomination for the 2013 AFL Rising Star after collecting 26 disposals, 5 marks and 4 tackles in the Western Bulldogs' 32-point defeat to Gold Coast. Macrae had one of his best games for the season in the Western Bulldogs' round thirteen 60-point loss to Richmond, collecting a season best 27 disposals, as well as 3 marks, a tackle and three clearances. Despite being one of the youngest players in the match, Macrae was named as one of the Bulldogs' best on ground. In August of the 2013 season, Macrae signed a 3-year contract extension, keeping him at the Bulldogs until 2016. At the conclusion of the season, Macrae was presented with the Chris Grant Best First Year Player Award, after averaging 17.92 disposals throughout his 13 games that season.

Macrae's 2014 season was one of the best seasons by a second-year player in history, in contrast to the Bulldogs' mediocre 14th place season. Becoming a key part of the new Bulldogs' midfield, he recorded 25 or more disposals 15 times. Macrae started out the season with an impressive performance that saw him named best on ground in the Western Bulldogs' 65-point loss to West Coast. He gathered 31 disposals, breaking his personal best from the 2013 season, and also got 2 goals, 7 marks and 3 tackles. Just two rounds later, Macrae was again named best on ground in the team's 2-point win over Richmond. He collected 30 disposals, 1 goal, 9 marks and 6 tackles. Macrae stamped his mark on the AFL in the Western Bulldogs' 28-point victory against Gold Coast in Round 17, becoming the youngest player to record 40 or more disposals in a game. Macrae gathered 43 disposals while kicking 2 goals, taking 6 marks and 5 tackles. Macrae was named best on ground, and received lots of praise for his effort. He followed up his incredible performance with another solid 32 disposal effort the next round in the Western Bulldogs' 7-point loss to Essendon. He also collected 1 goal, 7 marks and 4 tackles. Macrae was rewarded for his stellar second season with the Doug Hawkins Medal, awarded to the player who places runner up in the Western Bulldogs best and fairest voting. He collected 168 votes, 67 votes behind first-placed Tom Liberatore. He also claimed the Tony Liberatore Most Improved Player Award. He was named in the preliminary squad of the 22 Under 22 team, but narrowly missed out on making the team. Macrae also collected the highest number of Brownlow votes out of any Bulldog that season, with a total of ten. He picked up the maximum best on ground 3 votes twice, in Rounds 3 and 17, and picked up 2 votes twice in Rounds 12 and 18.

Macrae backed up his previous season with another solid season, averaging 26 disposals a game. With the Bulldogs making the finals for the first time since 2010, it was a year of improvement for both Macrae and the team. His first game for the season, the Western Bulldogs' 10-point win over West Coast, saw him named as the Bulldogs' second best player in the match, behind Matthew Boyd. He collected 31 disposals and 8 marks in his impressive performance. In April that year, he signed a two-year contract extension alongside fellow 2012 draftee Jake Stringer, keeping him at the club until 2018. Despite averaging 21.3 disposals in the first 6 rounds of the season, and collecting 23 disposals the previous game, Macrae was omitted for the 7th and 8th rounds of the season. He was again kept out of the senior team in round 8, despite a 37 disposal, 6 tackle game for the reserves team the previous week. In his next game in the reserves he collected a game high 10 tackles and another above 30 disposal game, leading coach Luke Beveridge to put him back in the main side in the 9th round. His round 12 performance in the team's 72-point demolition of the Brisbane Lions saw him collect his highest disposals count that season, a total of 35, while also getting 6 marks and 4 tackles. This dominant game saw him earn 3 Brownlow votes. He had one of his best performances for the season in the team's 22-point win against Gold Coast in the 15th round of the season, after he collected 33 disposals, 1 goal, 2 behinds and 10 marks. Macrae earned another 3 Brownlow votes in his best on ground performance after he played his 50th career game in the Western Bulldogs' 64-point sweep over Port Adelaide in the 19th round of the 2015 AFL season. In the match, he collected 30 disposals, 2 marks and 2 tackles. Macrae placed in 8th position in the Charles Sutton Medal, 76 votes behind first-placed Easton Wood. Macrae improved on his Brownlow performance slightly from the previous year, obtaining 11 votes, putting him at second place in the club and 27th overall. He picked up maximum votes twice, in Rounds 12 and 19, as well as 2 votes in rounds 14 and 15, and 1 vote in round 10.

=== 2016–2017: Premiership glory ===
Macrae enjoyed another consistent season in 2016, averaging 27.6 disposals throughout his 22 games in the Bulldogs' fairytale season, where they broke a 62-year premiership drought from 7th place on the ladder. He never had under 20 disposals in a game that season, highlighting his consistency. He started out the season with a bang, collecting 30 disposals and kicking a goal in the Western Bulldogs' 65-point annihilation of Fremantle in the opening round, getting named as one of the team's best players that match. He also contributed with 5 marks, 4 tackles and 3 inside 50s. He had two of his best games for the season in the 6th and 11th 2016 rounds respectively, getting 33 disposals in each game. He earned 1 Brownlow vote for his performance in Round 11, his only vote that season. He was named as one of the Bulldogs' best players in the team's round ten 21-point victory over Collingwood, collecting 32 disposals, 6 marks, and a season high 10 tackles. In Round 12 he had a hamstring scare, but despite this managed to play the next week. Macrae tore a hamstring tendon in the Western Bulldogs' 25-point loss against Geelong in Round 19, a devastating blow for Macrae and the team, who were close to finals. In a battle against time to be fit for the finals, both he and teammate Tom Liberatore underwent an intensive rehabilitation program. Both players benefited from the newly introduced AFL pre-finals bye which gave them extra time to be deemed fit enough for selection in the Elimination Final against West Coast. Macrae and Liberatore were just two of five changes Beveridge made to the team and the risk paid off, with the Bulldogs upsetting the highly fancied Eagles by 47 points. Macrae would go on to become one of the Bulldogs' key players in their amazing finals campaign, averaging 30 disposals a game throughout the finals series. Macrae had his best game for the season in the Western Bulldogs' 23-point victory against Hawthorn in the semi-final, as he racked up 39 possessions and was influential in the Bulldogs' second-half demolition of a team they had previously never beaten in finals, and had not beaten since the 2010 season. He was named as one of the best on ground, behind Bulldogs star Marcus Bontempelli. In the thrilling preliminary final against Greater Western Sydney, Macrae held his nerve to kick the winning set shot goal deep into the final quarter to get the Bulldogs into their first grand final since 1961. In the Grand Final, he was again among the Bulldogs' best with 33 disposals.

Macrae finished equal 7th in the Charles Sutton Medal voting with first-year player Caleb Daniel, with a total of 185 votes, 234 votes behind first-placed Marcus Bontempelli. He was named in the preliminary 22 Under 22 squad, but missed out on making the final 22.

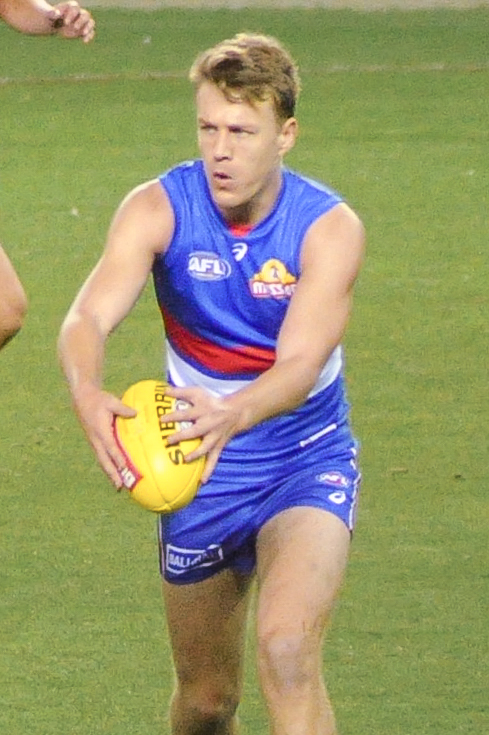
Jack Macrae during the AFL round two match between the Western Bulldogs and Sydney on 31 March 2017

The 2017 AFL season saw Macrae rapidly rise to the top of the Bulldogs midfield, improving his midfield work. He played every game of the season and averaged 27.5 disposals a game, while gathering 30 or more disposals in 8 games. Round 5 saw him perform as one of the best players for the Bulldogs in a 32-point comeback victory over the Brisbane Lions. In that game, he collected 29 disposals, 1 goal, 3 marks and 3 tackles. Macrae had a similarly good performance just two rounds later in Round 8, where he was named as one of the Bulldogs' best, collecting 32 disposals, 1 behind, 4 marks and 4 tackles. Round 12 saw Macrae be named as one of the Bulldogs' few good players in a 46-point loss to Sydney. He took 32 disposals, a team high for that game, and also 5 marks and 4 tackles. By around halfway through the season, it was clear how much of an impact Macrae was having, touted as one of the team's most valuable players that season so far. Macrae got better as the season went on, having one of his best performances in the Dogs' thrilling 1-point victory over North Melbourne in the 14th round, where he gathered 32 disposals, 5 clearances and 10 tackles. He earned 2 Brownlow votes for that game. In round 17, Macrae earned 2 Brownlow votes and collected above 30 disposals in the Western Bulldogs' 20-point win over Carlton. He was named again as one of the best in Round 20, collecting 32 disposals againast Brisbane Lions. Rounds 22 and 23 saw him pick up a combine 3 Brownlow votes, as he hit a purple patch towards the late end of the season. He hit his highest disposals count for the season after a best-on-team performance in the team's loss against Port Adelaide in Round 22, collecting 41 disposals. He once again earned two Brownlow votes for his performance in Round 23, after collecting 33 disposals, 3 marks and 7 tackles in the team's 9-point loss to Hawthorn.

Macrae finished third in the Charles Sutton Medal voting for 2017, winning the Gary Dempsey medal awarded to third place in the Bulldogs' best and fairest voting. He tallied up a total of 155 votes, 30 behind back-to-back winner Marcus Bontempelli. He recorded 8 Brownlow votes, thrice getting 2 votes and getting 1 vote twice. In November that year, Macrae signed a long term four-year contract, keeping him at the club until 2022. After signing, Macrae stated: "I've loved playing for the club and am excited about what the future holds, I'm proud to be on the verge of being a 100-game player at the club, and motivated to continue to improve my game every season." List manager Brendan McCartney said "Jackson took his game to another level in 2017, and has become one of our most consistent performers, while he is already an important member of our midfield, he still has massive upside, and it's fantastic to see him recommit for the long term."

=== 2018–2019: Maiden All-Australian ===
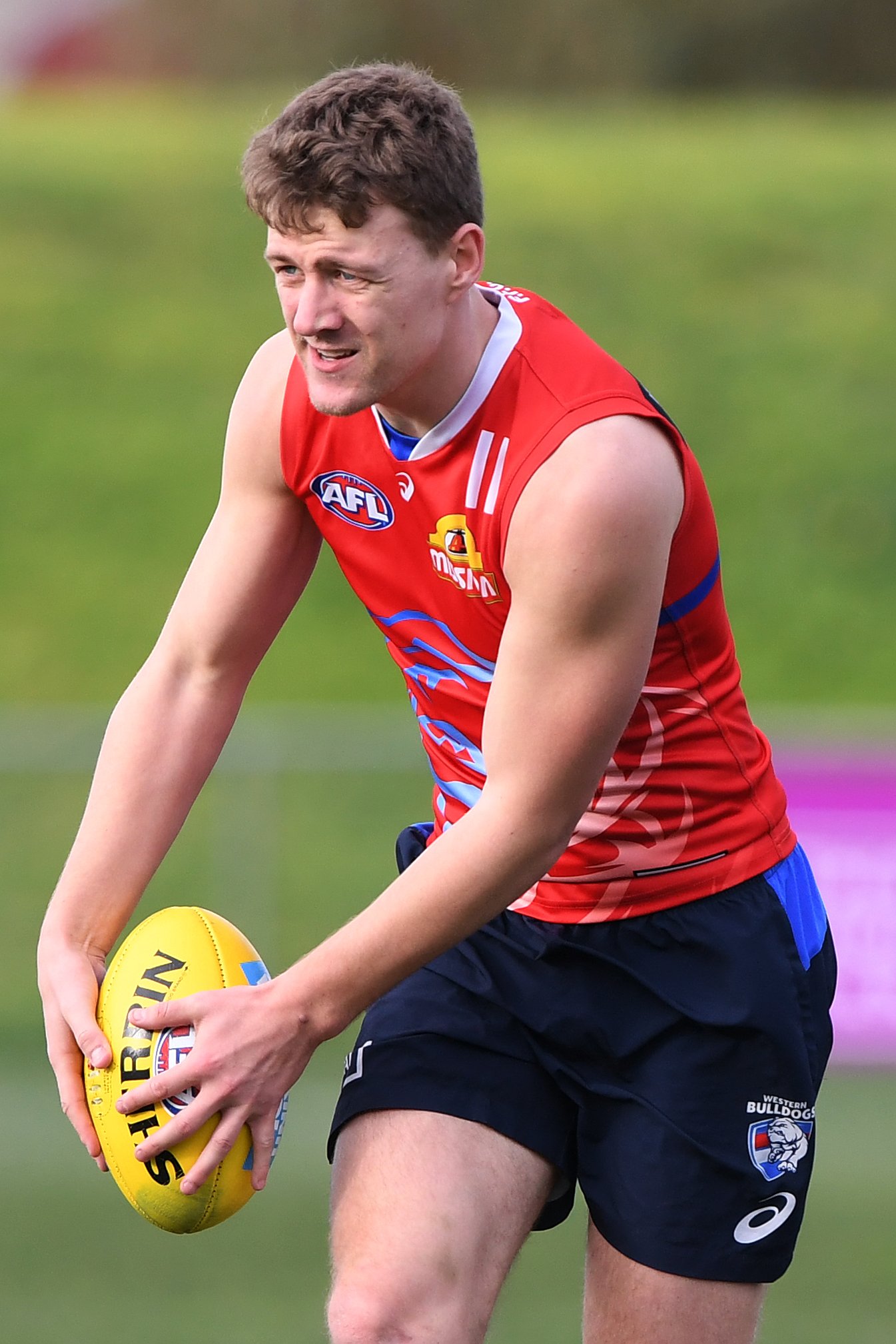
Jack Macrae during Western Bulldogs training on 7 August 2018

Macrae stood up for his team in 2018, moving into the elite category of footballers. He got named as the best Bulldog on ground in his 100th game against Greater Western Sydney in Round 1 of the 2018 AFL season. He gathered 31 disposals, 1 behind, 5 marks and 6 tackles. Macrae had close to his best game for the season in Round 2, where the Bulldogs were outdone by a formidable Eagles team by 51-points. In that game he collected a match-high 31 disposals, as well as 3 goals, 6 marks and 4 tackles. He had two impressive back to back perfromrnaces in Rounds 7 and 8, getting a combine total of 87 disposals in those two games. Round 7 saw him have an excellent game against Gold Coast, where he totalled 40 disposals and got named best on ground. He was given three Brownlow Medal votes for his performance. Then in Round 8, Macrae broke his career record of disposals in a single match, collecting an incredible 47 disposals in the team's 14-point win against Brisbane Lions. He was once again named best on ground and received another 3 Brownlow votes. These performances boosted his reputation as one of the AFL's best midfielders, gaining attention and praise from the media. He broke his record for most tackles in the next game with 13 tackles, a game high which saw him get named as the Bulldogs' best player on ground for the third game in a row. Macrae suffered a low-grade hamstring strain in the Western Bulldogs' 57-point loss to Port Adelaide in the 14th round of the season. He returned to the team in Round 17, and collected 33 disposals in his first game back, which saw him named as the Bulldogs' best. Macrae's performance in the final round of the season was one of his best, kicking a goal and gathering 43 disposals in a dominant performance against Richmond, which saw the Bulldogs narrowly lose. This performance saw him nab all 3 Brownlow votes for the third time that season.

Macrae was named in the preliminary squad of the 2018 All-Australian team, but missed out on making the final squad, which many considered unlucky due to his incredible performance all year. Macrae received the Doug Hawkins medal for the second time in his career after placing just 1 vote behind Lachie Hunter in the Western Bulldogs Charles Sutton Medal voting, tallying 190 votes over 19 games that season. He also won the John Van Groningen Domestique award for 2018, awarded to the player who places the team above themselves in games. Macrae secured 14 votes in the 2018 Brownlow Medal, placing equal-19th in the count.

Macrae had his most successful season to date in 2019 being selected in the All-Australian team and being placed high in the Brownlow Medal count at the end of the year. The pre-season saw him work hard to improve his skillset, stating "I pride myself on my performance year-in, year-out and there's still so many areas for myself to improve which is really exciting," Macrae had 36 disposals and a goal in the second round of the year, which saw the Western Bulldogs pull off a major comeback in the final quarter to defeat Hawthorn. He earned 3 brownlow votes for his performance. Apart from a 36 disposal performance against Richmond in Round 7, he had a relatively quiet start to the season. Round 14 was the first time he collected over 40 disposals that season, getting 41 disposals in the Western Bulldogs' 9-point loss to Collingwood to be one of the Bulldogs' best on ground. He earned two Brownlow votes in this game. Round 19 saw Macrae as one of the finest players in his team, taking 38 disposals, 7 marks, 5 tackles and 8 clearances, which resulted in him being given two Brownlow Medal votes for that match. This game would see him kickstart a run of five consecutive Brownlow vote winning performances, greatly pushing him into Brownlow Medal contention. Round 20 saw Macrae earn 2 Brownlow Medal votes in a dominant display over the Brisbane Lions, where he set his disposals record for that season at 45. He also collected 4 marks, 7 tackles and 12 clearances. Round 21 saw him earn another 2 Brownlow Medal votes in the team's 104-point anhliation of Essendon. He kicked 1 goal, and collected 38 disposals, 2 marks and 8 tackles. Round 22 saw him earn another 3 Brownlow medal votes, after he tallied up 39 disposals, his 10th consecutive time getting 30 or more disposals in a game. In that game, he also collected 1 mark, 3 tackles and 7 clearances. Another outstanding performance in Round 23 saw Macrae earn back-to-back best on ground honours, securing another 3 Brownlow Medal votes. The 34-point win over Adelaide saw Macrae collect 1 goal, 35 disposals, 4 marks and 8 clearances. Macrae was also named as the Bulldogs' best in their disappointing Elimination Finals loss to Greater Western Sydney, after collecting 32 disposals, a game high.

I mean seriously, we will call for a spill of the board if he doesn't make All-Australian. It is remarkable what this kid is doing.

— David King (Australian rules footballer)

Macrae won a plethora of awards at the season's conclusion. He was awarded with his maiden All-Australian team honour, alongside teammate Marcus Bontempelli. The AFL player ratings system saw Macrae ranked as the 10th best player in the entire competition. He was named in the Herald Sun's top 50 players for 2019 with All-Australian teammate Bontempelli and young gun Josh Dunkley. He earned a career-high 22 votes in the 2019 Brownlow Medal, placing equal eighth in the count with teammate Marcus Bontempelli. Macrae also got his third top-place finish for the 3rd season in a row, winning the Gary Dempsey Medal with a total of 268 votes, 31 behind 1st placed Marcus Bontempelli. He also led the league for most disposals averaged per game, averaging 33.4 disposals over his 23 games that season.

=== 2020–2024: Continued success and move to St Kilda ===
The 2020 AFL season was another successful one for Macrae, who averaged 26.39 disposals a game even with shortened quarters. He participated in the State of Origin for Bushfire Relief Match, playing on the Victorian team with teammate Marcus Bontempelli and against teammate Jason Johannisen. He wore the same number as his Bulldogs jersey, number 11. It only took Macrae until the third round of the year to receive his first best on ground performance, receiving 3 Brownlow Medal votes after his 25 disposal performance in the Western Bulldogs' 24 point win over Greater Western Sydney. He also collected 5 marks and a game-high 7 tackles. In Round 7, Macrae earned another 2 Brownlow votes after he contributed to the Western Bulldogs' 42-point flogging of Essendon. He had 29 disposals, 2 marks, 2 tackles and 4 clearances. Macrae had his second best on ground performance for the year against Gold Coast in Round 8, racking up 29 disposals, 2 marks, 6 tackles and 7 clearances. Another 2 votes were awarded to Macrae in his 150th career game in the 9th round of the season, where he was the shining light in the Western Bulldogs' 41-point defeat to Richmond. He gathered 37 disposals, the highest in the game and the equal second highest for the season, as well as 2 marks, 4 tackles and 4 clearances. Round 11 saw Macrae receive only 2 Brownlow votes, despite setting the record in the 2020 AFL season for most disposals in a single game, tallying up 40. While he did not receive the 3 best on ground votes, which were awarded to Lachie Neale, he did receive 2. He also kicked 1 goal, and had 4 marks, 4 tackles and 3 clearances. His Round 16 performance against West Coast was also impressive, earning him two Brownlow votes. He racked up 29 disposals, 2 marks, 3 tackles and 5 clearances. Macrae had one of his lowest disposal counts for the season in the team's 3-point Elimination Final loss to St Kilda. Despite this, he still had the third-most disposals out of anyone on his team.

Once again, Macrae amassed a number of awards at the season's end. He was selected for his second All-Australian team in a row, this time named on the wing. He polled 15 votes in the 2020 Brownlow Medal, placing equal 5th with other stars like Patrick Dangerfield, Luke Parker, and Dustin Martin. Despite polling the most votes out of any Bulldog in the Brownlow Medal count, Macrae placed 4th in the Charles Sutton Medal count with 154 votes, 51 votes behind first-placed Caleb Daniel.

Macrae began the 2021 AFL season in good form, collecting 35 and 41 disposals in his first two games, and being named in the Bulldogs' best in both matches. A 32 disposals, 1 goal round 4 performance against Brisbane Lions saw him again be named one of the team's best, nabbing 9 coaches votes to place him at equal-second in the count up to that point. Macrae obtained coaches votes in every single round up to and including Round 6, after a dominant Round 6 performance with 40 disposals, a goal and 8 inside 50s securing him 8 votes. Macrae drew praise from his coach Luke Beveridge after his dominant early season display, where he stated "Jack has had his best start to any season since I've been the senior coach". Macrae became just the second player ever to collect 30 or more disposals in the first 8 rounds of the season, the only other player being David Thorpe in 1971. After Macrae collected 31 disposals in round 16 against North Melbourne, he set the all-time record for most consecutive 30-disposal games in VFL/AFL history, with 15 in a row. Macrae performed strongly in the Western Bulldogs' finals campaign, winning the Gary Ayres Award as best player throughout the finals series.

Following his All-Australian years, Macrae fell out of favour at the Bulldogs, playing more prominently in the VFL and the starting substitute in AFL matches. A stand out performance in the VFL came early in the 2024 season when he collected 46 disposals and 16 clearances against Gold Coast. At the conclusion of the 2024 season, Jack Macrae requested to be traded despite being contracted until 2027. Macrae nominated St Kilda and was officially traded on 16 October.

=== 2025–: Career Revival ===
Macrae started strong for his new team racking up 34, 35 disposals across the first 2 games of 2025. This was due to him being shifted back into the inside midfield and centre‑bounce attendance zone at St Kilda. Macrae averaged around ~12% centre‑bounce attendances at the Western Bulldogs in 2024, but after two games in 2025 at St Kilda he jumped to ~79% average. Macrae showed dominance in 2025 which was highlighted by his outing of 38 disposals and 14 clearances in Round 8. However this run was cut short due to Macrae sustaining a punctured lung in Round 10 which caused him to miss the next 3 weeks. Even though Macrae couldn't fully recapture his form previous to his injury, Macrae had games of notice in Rounds 15, 17, and 22.

== Personal life ==
Macrae is in a relationship with Louisa Macleod, who he took to the 2017 Brownlow Medal presentation night. The couple married on 6 January 2024.

Macrae's brother, Finlay Macrae, was drafted by Collingwood in the 2020 AFL draft. Macrae's father, David Macrae, died on 21 February 2021.

Macrae appeared in an advertising campaign for McDonalds that began airing on television throughout the early months of 2021. He has done charity work with Team Ladder, an official AFL player charity which works on using the power of players and industry to help improve the lives of young people.

== Statistics ==
Updated to the end of round 22, 2026.

Legend
G	Goals	K	Kicks	D	Disposals	T	Tackles
B	Behinds	H	Handballs	M	Marks
#	Played in that season's premiership team	†	Led the league for the season

Season	Team	No.	Games	Totals							Averages (per game)							Votes
Season	Team	No.	Games	G	B	K	H	D	M	T	G	B	K	H	D	M	T	Votes
2013	Western Bulldogs	11	13	3	1	100	133	233	35	35	0.2	0.1	7.7	10.2	17.9	2.7	2.7	0
2014	Western Bulldogs	11	21	9	5	302	260	562	119	86	0.4	0.2	14.4	12.4	26.8	5.7	4.1	10
2015	Western Bulldogs	11	21	5	6	287	267	554	97	117	0.2	0.3	13.7	12.7	26.4	4.6	5.6	11
2016^{#}	Western Bulldogs	11	22	2	4	271	336	607	104	96	0.1	0.2	12.3	15.3	27.6	4.7	4.4	1
2017	Western Bulldogs	11	22	2	5	260	345	605	100	127	0.1	0.2	11.8	15.7	27.5	4.5	5.8	8
2018	Western Bulldogs	11	19	8	5	299	324	623	110	102	0.4	0.3	15.7	17.1	32.8	5.8	5.4	14
2019	Western Bulldogs	11	23	5	2	342	425	767	101	120	0.2	0.1	14.9	18.5	33.3	4.4	5.2	22
2020 (Note: The 2020 season was played with 17 home-and-away matches per team (down from 22) and 16-minute quarters with time on (down from 20-minute quarters with time on) due to the impact of the COVID-19 pandemic.)	Western Bulldogs	11	18	3	3	205	268	473	50	72	0.2	0.2	11.4	14.9	26.3	2.8	4.0	15
2021	Western Bulldogs	11	26	6	4	435	445^{†}	880	102	128	0.2	0.2	16.7	17.1	33.8	3.9	4.9	14
2022	Western Bulldogs	11	23	4	4	342	363	705	96	87	0.2	0.2	14.9	15.8	30.7	4.2	3.8	11
2023	Western Bulldogs	11	22	7	2	239	318	557	82	97	0.3	0.1	10.9	14.5	25.3	3.7	4.4	0
2024	Western Bulldogs	11	19	5	2	146	203	349	65	63	0.3	0.1	7.7	10.7	18.4	3.4	3.3	0
2025	St Kilda	6	21	1	4	240	276	516	66	114	0.0	0.2	11.4	13.1	24.6	3.1	5.4	8
2026	St Kilda	6	10	0	1	72	135	207	29	42	0.0	0.1	7.2	13.5	20.7	2.9	4.2	0
Career			280	60	48	3540	4098	7638	1156	1286	0.2	0.2	12.6	14.6	27.3	4.1	4.6	114

== Honours and achievements ==
AFL

- Team
  - AFL premiership: 2016
- Individual
  - All-Australian team: 2019, 2020, 2021
  - Doug Hawkins Medal: 2014, 2018, 2021
  - Gary Ayres Award: 2021
  - Gary Dempsey Medal: 2017, 2019
  - John van Groningen Domestique Award: 2018
  - Tony Liberatore Most Improved Player Award: 2014
  - Chris Grant Best First Year Player Award: 2013
  - AFL Rising Star nominee: 2013

TAC Cup

- Team
  - TAC Cup premiers & Best on Ground - Oakleigh Chargers: 2012
