= Sam Darley =

Australian rules footballer

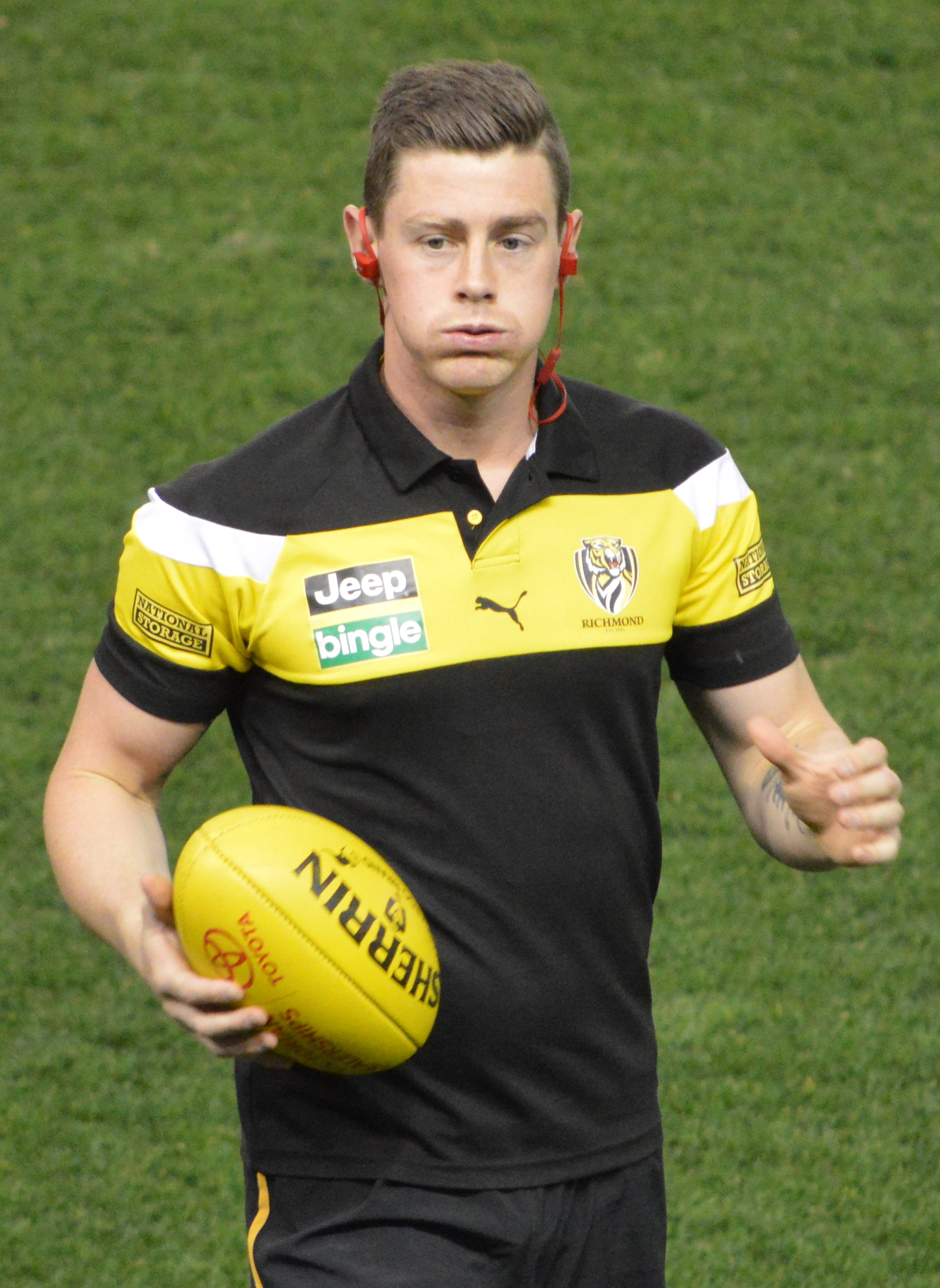
- Darley captaining Richmond at the 2017 VFL grand final

Personal information
- Full name: Sam Darley
- Born: 15 February 1993 (age 33)
- Original team: North Hobart (TFL)
- Height: 186 cm (6 ft 1 in)
- Weight: 79 kg (174 lb)

Playing career^{1}
Years	Club	Games (Goals)
2012–2013	Greater Western Sydney	13 (1)
2014–2015	Western Bulldogs	7 (1)
Total		20 (2)
- ^{1} Playing statistics correct to the end of 2015.

Career highlights
- Junior: U-18 Division 2 Best & Fairest: 2010; VFL premiership player: 2014

Sam Darley (born 15 February 1993) is a former professional Australian rules footballer who played for the Greater Western Sydney Giants and Western Bulldogs in the Australian Football League (AFL). Darley made his debut in round 8, 2012, against Brisbane Lions at the Gabba.

On 25 October 2013, Darley was traded to the Western Bulldogs for pick 78. He played his first match for the Western Bulldogs in round 15, 2014 against Melbourne. The Bulldogs defeated the Demons by 6 points, marking Darley's first win at AFL level. He played a further four games in 2014, kicking his first goal for the Bulldogs against St Kilda in round 20.

He was delisted at the conclusion of the 2015 AFL season.

Darley later began playing with the Richmond Football Club's reserves side in the VFL, where he captained the team to the 2017 grand final.

Darley returned to the North Hobart Football Club for the 2019 TSL season.
