= Nick Haynes =

Australian rules footballer

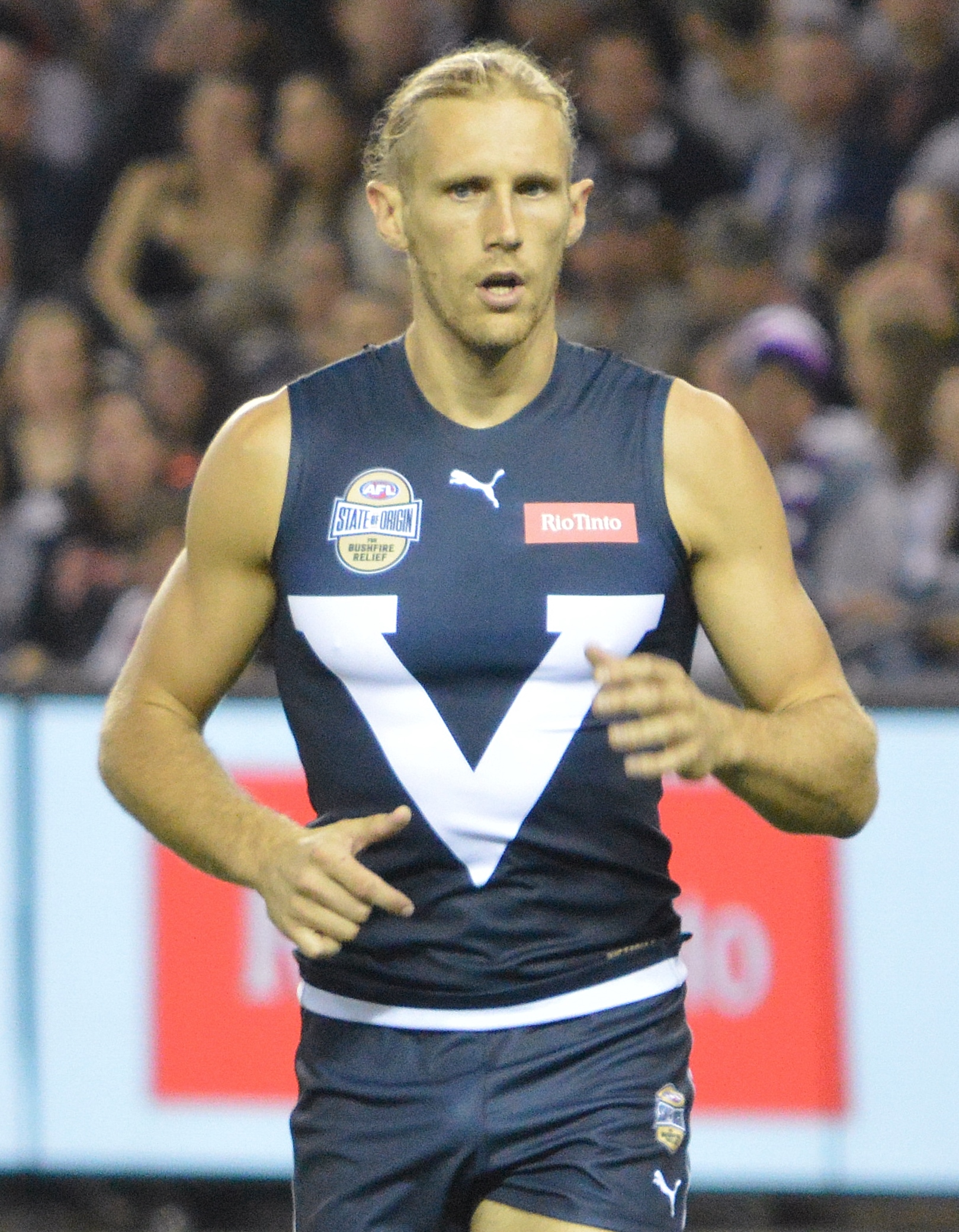
- Haynes playing for Victoria in 2020

Personal information
- Full name: Nick Haynes
- Nicknames: Train, Plane
- Born: 18 May 1992 (age 34)
- Original team: Dandenong Stingrays (TAC Cup) Frankston Rovers / Frankston Bombers
- Draft: No. 7, 2011 national draft
- Height: 192 cm (6 ft 4 in)
- Weight: 88 kg (194 lb)
- Position: Defender

Club information
- Current club: Carlton
- Number: 26

Playing career^{1}
Years	Club	Games (Goals)
2012–2024	Greater Western Sydney	211 (13)
2025–	Carlton	42 (0)
Total		253 (13)

Representative team honours^{2}
Years	Team	Games (Goals)
2020	Victoria	1 (0)
- ^{1} Playing statistics correct to the end of the 2026 season.^{2} Representative statistics correct as of 2020.

Career highlights
- All-Australian: 2020; Kevin Sheedy Medal: 2020

Nick Haynes (born 18 May 1992) is a professional Australian rules footballer playing for the Carlton Football Club in the Australian Football League (AFL). He was drafted by Greater Western Sydney in the 2011 national draft with pick seven and played with them from 2012 to 2024. Haynes made his debut in round 10, 2012, against Geelong at Kardinia Park. He was part of the Giants' inaugural list in the AFL competition. He plays as a hybrid defender, adept at directly defending small forwards, taking intercepting marks and rebounding from defensive fifty. He has also played up the field as a wingman. He was awarded an All-Australian selection in 2020 and won the Kevin Sheedy Medal in the same year.

== Early life ==
Nick Haynes grew up in Somerville, a town on the Mornington Peninsula in Melbourne, Victoria. Haynes played junior football until quitting as a 13 year old for 4 years. After returning to football as a 17 year old, Haynes played for under 18s at Frankston Bombers and then for the Dandenong Stingrays at the TAC Cup.

== AFL career ==
=== Greater Western Sydney (2012–2024) ===
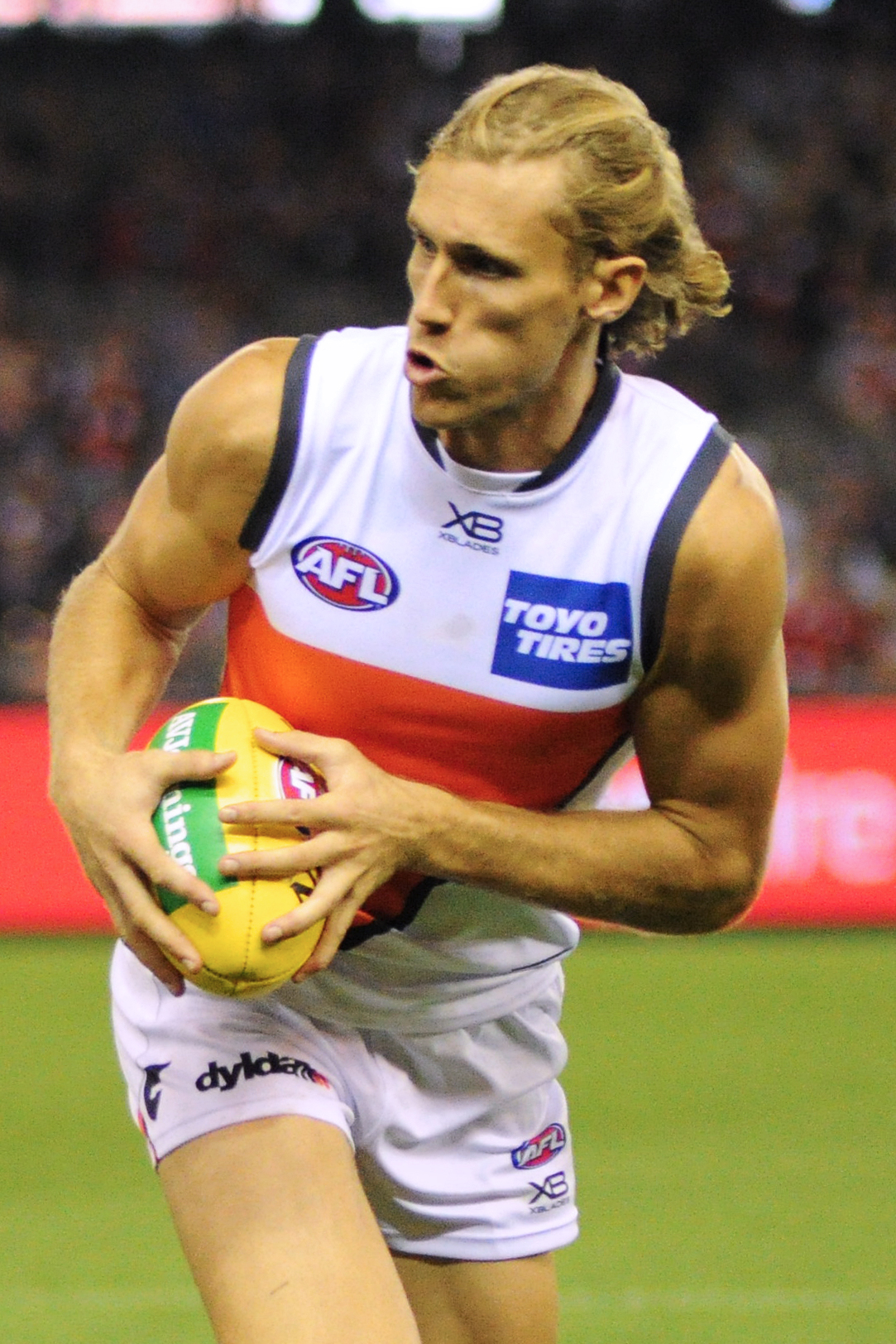
Haynes playing for Greater Western Sydney in 2018

Haynes was drafted by Greater Western Sydney with their sixth selection and seventh overall in the 2011 national draft. He made his debut in Greater Western Sydney's inaugural season, in 2012, playing in round ten of the season against Geelong at Kardinia Park where he had eight disposals (six kicks and two handballs), three marks and five tackles in a 65-point loss.

In 2013, Haynes signed on for a new two year contract after a rookie season where Haynes self admittedly struggled.

In the 2017 AFL Season during round six, Haynes suffering a hamstring tendon tear against the Western Bulldogs, which ruled him out for about ten weeks. Haynes landed awkwardly in the splits position following a one-on-one marking contest late in the final quarter at Manuka Oval.

The 2018 AFL Season saw Haynes put together what was regarded as his breakout season after a multiple injury interrupted seasons. Haynes was ranked eleventh in the competition for intercepts with 158 in his 24 appearances. Giants coach Leon Cameron said Haynes, has added more elements to his game over the past couple of seasons, and was quoted as saying, "I think he gets undervalued for the amount of run he provides. He's a chop-out marking specialist and every club wants to have one of those players, because marking is gold when you're starting your attack (from defence). But his ability to cover the ground this year has been phenomenal, as has his ability to beat his man one-on-one.".

In 2019, Haynes signed a five year deal to keep him at the Giants till 2024.

Haynes had a career best season during the 2020 AFL Season where he was awarded a debut All-Australian selection on a half back flank. He also won the Kevin Sheedy Medal as the club's best and fairest player, tied with Lachie Whitfield.

=== Carlton (2024–present) ===
After 13 years at the Giants, Haynes departed as a free agent and moved to Carlton on a one-year deal. He had a strong first season with the Blues, coming fourth in the 2025 John Nicholls Medal count.

In September of 2025, Haynes signed a one-year contract extension to the end of 2026. After another strong season in 2026, Haynes extended his contract with Carlton to the end of 2027. He finished sixth in the 2026 John Nicholls Medal count.

== Personal life ==
Haynes made a cameo appearance on Guy Montgomery's Guy Mont-Spelling Bee in 2024.

== Statistics ==
Updated to the end of the 2026 season.

Legend
G	Goals	K	Kicks	D	Disposals	T	Tackles
B	Behinds	H	Handballs	M	Marks
†	Led the league for the season

Season	Team	No.	Games	Totals							Averages (per game)							Votes
Season	Team	No.	Games	G	B	K	H	D	M	T	G	B	K	H	D	M	T	Votes
2012	Greater Western Sydney	19	8	1	1	44	34	78	22	17	0.1	0.1	5.5	4.3	9.8	2.8	2.1	0
2013	Greater Western Sydney	19	11	0	0	94	46	140	60	26	0.0	0.0	8.5	4.2	12.7	5.5	2.4	0
2014	Greater Western Sydney	19	8	1	0	93	34	127	35	11	0.1	0.0	11.6	4.3	15.9	4.4	1.4	0
2015	Greater Western Sydney	19	17	2	1	160	81	241	91	22	0.1	0.1	9.4	4.8	14.2	5.4	1.3	0
2016	Greater Western Sydney	19	18	2	1	214	104	318	122	30	0.1	0.1	11.9	5.8	17.7	6.8	1.7	0
2017	Greater Western Sydney	19	19	2	2	227	108	335	115	29	0.1	0.1	11.9	5.7	17.6	6.1	1.5	0
2018	Greater Western Sydney	19	24	0	0	297	120	417	150	41	0.0	0.0	12.4	5.0	17.4	6.3	1.7	5
2019	Greater Western Sydney	19	23	1	3	318	114	432	181	35	0.0	0.1	13.8	5.0	18.8	7.9	1.5	5
2020 (Note: The 2020 season was played with 17 home-and-away matches per team (down from 22) and 16-minute quarters with time on (down from 20-minute quarters with time on) due to the impact of the COVID-19 pandemic.)	Greater Western Sydney	19	17	0	0	208	64	272	121	23	0.0	0.0	12.2	3.8	16.0	7.1^{†}	1.4	4
2021	Greater Western Sydney	19	21	1	1	253	120	373	156	17	0.0	0.0	12.0	5.7	17.8	7.4	0.8	0
2022	Greater Western Sydney	19	17	1	2	176	65	241	98	14	0.1	0.1	10.4	3.8	14.2	5.8	0.8	0
2023	Greater Western Sydney	19	20	2	2	214	101	315	125	15	0.1	0.1	10.7	5.1	15.8	6.3	0.8	0
2024	Greater Western Sydney	19	8	0	1	100	37	137	55	11	0.0	0.1	12.5	4.6	17.1	6.9	1.4	0
2025	Carlton	26	23	0	1	282	110	392	180	33	0.0	0.0	12.3	4.8	17.0	7.8	1.4	0
2026	Carlton	26	19	0	0	239	105	344	149	25	0.0	0.0	12.6	5.5	18.1	7.8	1.3	0
Career			253	13	15	2919	1243	4162	1660	349	0.1	0.1	11.5	4.9	16.5	6.6	1.4	14
