= Clay Smith (footballer) =

Australian rules footballer

Personal information
- Full name: Clay Smith
- Born: 11 May 1993 (age 33)
- Original team: Gippsland Power (TAC Cup)
- Draft: No. 17, 2011 National Draft
- Height: 180 cm (5 ft 11 in)
- Weight: 78 kg (172 lb)
- Position: Forward

Playing career^{1}
Years	Club	Games (Goals)
2012–2018	Western Bulldogs	55 (43)
- ^{1} Playing statistics correct to the end of 2017.

Career highlights
- AFL premiership player (2016)

Clay Smith (born 11 May 1993) is a former Australian rules footballer who played for the Western Bulldogs in the Australian Football League (AFL). Smith was drafted to the Western Bulldogs with the 17th selection in 2011 AFL draft from the Gippsland Power in the TAC Cup. He was given the #14 jumper, previously worn by Callan Ward, who had moved to Greater Western Sydney at the end of the season prior.

Smith made his AFL debut on 1 April 2012 in the opening round of the 2012 AFL season against the West Coast Eagles. Smith was one of the Bulldogs' best players, gathering 13 possessions and kicking 4 goals, before being substituted off the field just before 3 quarter time due to severe cramping.

Clay Smith announced his retirement from AFL football on 9 July 2018 due to persistent injuries.

== Statistics ==
Legend
G	Goals	K	Kicks	D	Disposals	T	Tackles
B	Behinds	H	Handballs	M	Marks

Season	Team	No.	Games	Totals							Averages (per game)						
Season	Team	No.	Games	G	B	K	H	D	M	T	G	B	K	H	D	M	T
2012	Western Bulldogs	14	16	6	5	135	85	220	55	75	0.4	0.3	8.4	5.3	13.8	3.4	4.7
2013	Western Bulldogs	14	14	10	6	128	84	212	38	61	0.7	0.4	9.1	6.0	15.1	2.7	4.4
2014	Western Bulldogs	14	1	0	1	8	5	13	1	2	0.0	1.0	8.0	5.0	13.0	1.0	2.0
2015	Western Bulldogs	14	3	1	0	13	15	28	5	10	0.3	0.0	4.3	5.0	9.3	1.7	3.3
2016^{#}	Western Bulldogs	14	13	18	11	100	94	194	43	77	1.4	0.8	7.7	7.2	14.9	3.3	5.9
2017	Western Bulldogs	14	8	8	5	52	40	92	24	41	1.0	0.6	6.5	5.0	11.5	3.0	5.1
Career			55	43	28	436	323	759	166	266	0.8	0.5	7.9	5.9	13.8	3.0	4.8

== Honours and achievements ==
- Team
  - AFL premiership: 2016
