= Tory Dickson =

Australian rules footballer

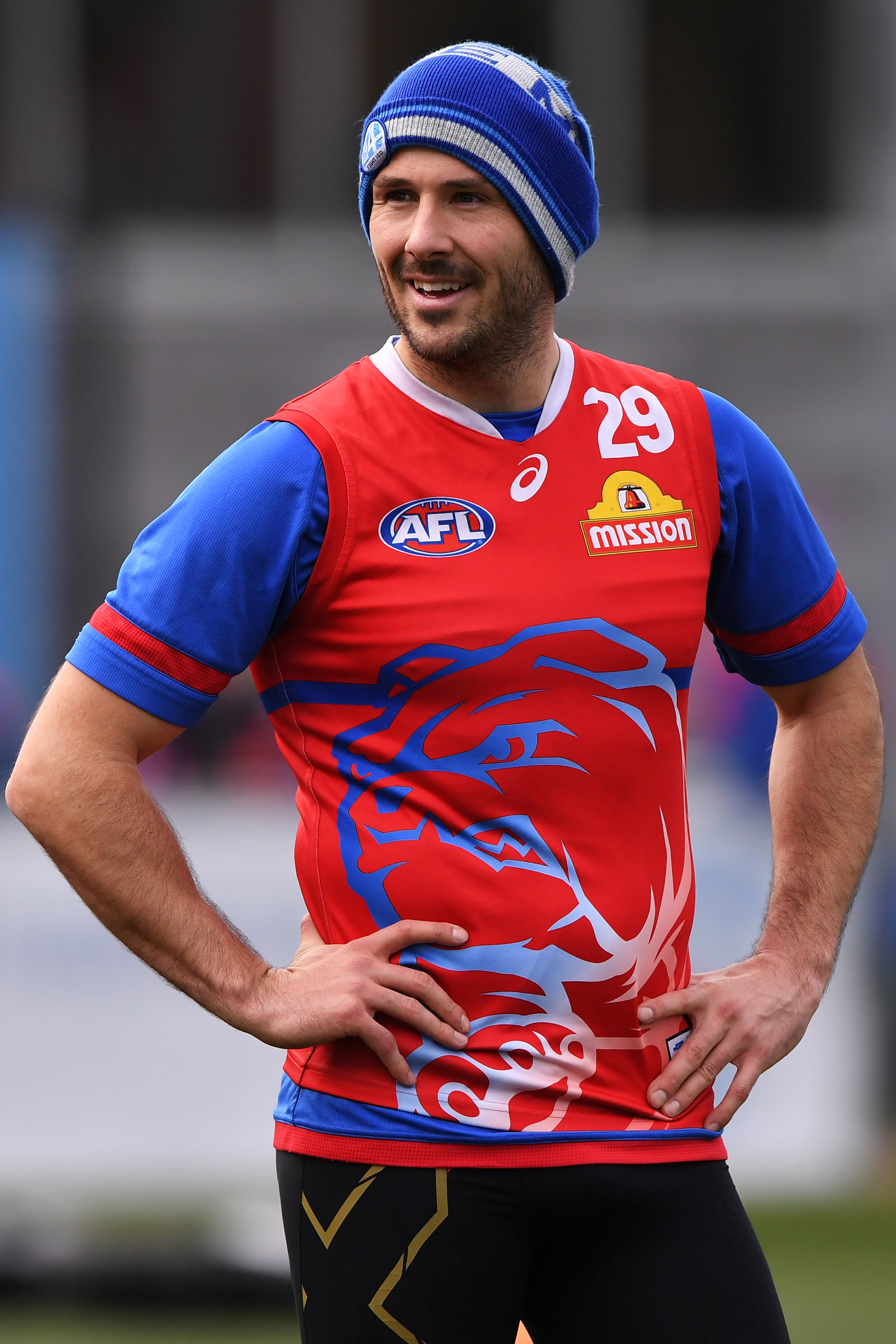
- Dickson in August 2018

Personal information
- Full name: Tory Dickson
- Born: 26 September 1987 (age 39)
- Original team: Bendigo Bombers (VFL)
- Draft: No. 57, 2011 national draft
- Height: 184 cm (6 ft 0 in)
- Weight: 83 kg (183 lb)
- Position: Forward

Club information
- Current club: Western Bulldogs
- Number: 29

Playing career^{1}
Years	Club	Games (Goals)
2012–2020	Western Bulldogs	114 (181)
- ^{1} Playing statistics correct to the end of 2020.

Career highlights
- AFL premiership player (2016); VFL premiership player (2014)

Tory Dickson (born 26 September 1987) is a former Australian rules footballer who played for the Western Bulldogs in the Australian Football League (AFL). He played mainly as a medium-sized forward.

== Career ==
Before joining the Western Bulldogs, Dickson had been playing for various football clubs around Victoria. In 2009, he won the best and fairest award at Victorian Football League (VFL) club Frankston. After being overlooked for the AFL Draft, Dickson played for Noble Park in the Eastern Football League. In 2011, Dickson signed with the Bendigo Bombers and kicked 48 goals in 19 games.

At the age of 24, Dickson was selected by the Western Bulldogs in the 2011 National Draft, with pick #57. Dickson made his debut in round 1 of the 2012 AFL season against West Coast. He struggled to make an impact, and was dropped the following week.

After spending a month playing for his third VFL club, the Bulldogs' former affiliate Williamstown, Dickson was recalled to the Bulldogs for their round 7 match against North Melbourne.

Dickson is noted for the accuracy of his kicking for goal. He was the most accurate of all AFL players in 2019, and the third-most accurate since 1965.

On 27 September 2020 Dickson announced his retirement from AFL football.

== Statistics ==
Statistics are correct to the end of the 2019 season

Legend
G	Goals	K	Kicks	D	Disposals	T	Tackles
B	Behinds	H	Handballs	M	Marks

Season	Team	No.	Games	Totals							Averages (per game)						
Season	Team	No.	Games	G	B	K	H	D	M	T	G	B	K	H	D	M	T
2012	Western Bulldogs	29	17	23	9	119	118	237	56	64	1.4	0.5	7.0	6.9	13.9	3.3	3.8
2013	Western Bulldogs	29	13	22	10	108	75	183	48	39	1.7	0.8	8.3	5.8	14.1	3.7	3.0
2014	Western Bulldogs	29	4	3	1	18	21	39	9	9	0.8	0.3	4.5	5.3	9.8	2.3	2.3
2015	Western Bulldogs	29	23	50	12	172	126	298	71	72	2.2	0.5	7.5	5.5	13.0	3.1	3.1
2016^{#}	Western Bulldogs	29	22	40	17	166	132	298	92	57	1.8	0.8	7.5	6.0	13.5	4.2	2.6
2017	Western Bulldogs	29	9	11	3	44	48	92	33	27	1.2	0.3	4.9	5.3	10.2	3.7	3.0
2018	Western Bulldogs	29	8	8	1	42	34	76	24	15	1.0	0.1	5.3	4.3	9.5	3.0	1.9
2019	Western Bulldogs	29	17	24	8	109	85	194	60	41	1.4	0.5	6.4	5.0	11.4	3.5	2.4
Career			113	181	61	778	639	1417	393	324	1.6	0.5	6.9	5.7	12.5	3.5	2.9

== Honours and achievements ==
AFL

- Team
  - AFL premiership: 2016
  - Brad Johnson Best Team Player (2015)

VFL

- Team
  - VFL premiership: 2014
