= Rory Lobb =

Australian rules footballer

Personal information
- Full name: Rory Lobb
- Born: 9 February 1993 (age 33); Perth, Western Australia
- Original team: Swan Districts (WAFL)
- Draft: No. 29, 2013 national draft
- Height: 207 cm (6 ft 9 in)
- Weight: 106 kg (234 lb)
- Position: Forward / Ruckman / Defender

Club information
- Current club: Western Bulldogs
- Number: 7

Playing career^{1}
Years	Club	Games (Goals)
2014–2018	Greater Western Sydney	74 (64)
2019–2022	Fremantle	66 (79)
2023–	Western Bulldogs	83 (38)
Total		221 (180)

Representative team honours
Years	Team	Games (Goals)
2026	Western Australia	1 (0)
- ^{1} Playing statistics correct to the end of round 22, 2026.

Career highlights
- Fremantle leading goalkicker: 2022

Rory Lobb (born 9 February 1993) is a professional Australian rules footballer playing for the Western Bulldogs in the Australian Football League (AFL), having previously played for Greater Western Sydney and Fremantle.

== Early life ==
Lobb who came to football late after mainly focusing on basketball was taken with pick 29 in the 2013 national draft, and stands at 206 cm. Despite his height, he impressed many with his athletic ability while playing with Swan Districts in the West Australian Football League (WAFL) in 2013 where he averaged twelve disposals, three marks and twenty-four hitouts.

== AFL career ==
In round 12, 2014, Lobb was selected by the Giants to make his debut against Essendon at Spotless Stadium. Starting on Essendon veteran Dustin Fletcher, he joined the select few who kicked his first AFL goal with his first kick. In 2018, with the retirement of Shane Mumford straining GWS ruck options, Lobb was primarily used as the #1 ruckman. One of his standout games in the 2018 season came in round 15 against Hawthorn, where he kicked 3 goals in the first quarter.

On the first day of the 2018 trade period, Lobb formally requested a trade to the Fremantle Dockers. He had previously met with both WA-based clubs to explore his options, with permission from GWS, despite being contracted for 2019. He was officially traded on 17 October to Fremantle.

In 2019, after playing in both pre-season matches, Lobb made his debut for Fremantle in Round 1 against North Melbourne and kicked 2 goals. He went on to play 15 games in his first year at the Dockers, with foot and shoulder injuries affecting him.

Lobb's contested marking ability has been a strong aspect of his game, and in 2020 he collected 37 contested marks (an average of 2.2 per game) which ranked him third overall in the league.

Lobb kicked a career-best five-goal haul during Fremantle's eight-point win over Port Adelaide during round sixteen of the 2022 AFL season. He finished the season as Fremantle’s leading goalkicker, having kicked a career-high 36 goals. At the end of the season he requested a trade to the Western Bulldogs and was traded on 12 October.

== Statistics ==
Updated to the end of round 22, 2026.

Legend
G	Goals	K	Kicks	D	Disposals	T	Tackles
B	Behinds	H	Handballs	M	Marks	H/O	Hit-outs

Season	Team	No.	Games	Totals								Averages (per game)								Votes
Season	Team	No.	Games	G	B	K	H	D	M	T	H/O	G	B	K	H	D	M	T	H/O	Votes
2014	Greater Western Sydney	37	2	1	0	6	7	13	5	5	3	0.5	0.0	3.0	3.5	6.5	2.5	2.5	1.5	0
2015	Greater Western Sydney	37	9	6	3	39	36	75	29	29	80	0.7	0.3	4.3	4.0	8.3	3.2	3.2	8.9	0
2016	Greater Western Sydney	37	24	29	16	170	114	284	111	65	158	1.2	0.7	7.1	4.8	11.8	4.6	2.7	6.6	5
2017	Greater Western Sydney	37	20	17	8	123	105	228	86	47	221	0.9	0.4	6.2	5.3	11.4	4.3	2.4	11.1	0
2018	Greater Western Sydney	37	19	11	10	127	55	182	60	54	394	0.6	0.5	6.7	2.9	9.6	3.2	2.8	20.7	0
2019	Fremantle	37	15	13	11	119	78	197	61	24	319	0.9	0.7	7.9	5.2	13.1	4.1	1.6	21.3	1
2020 (Note: The 2020 season was played with 17 home-and-away matches per team (down from 22) and 16-minute quarters with time on (down from 20-minute quarters with time on) due to the impact of the COVID-19 pandemic.)	Fremantle	37	17	10	6	116	57	173	63	24	155	0.6	0.4	6.8	3.4	10.2	3.7	1.4	9.1	3
2021	Fremantle	37	13	20	19	108	60	168	73	15	54	1.5	1.5	8.3	4.6	12.9	5.6	1.2	4.2	7
2022	Fremantle	37	21	36	24	141	93	234	92	35	156	1.7	1.1	6.7	4.4	11.1	4.4	1.7	7.4	7
2023	Western Bulldogs	7	20	24	18	112	94	206	65	35	156	1.2	0.9	5.6	4.7	10.3	3.3	1.8	7.8	1
2024	Western Bulldogs	7	16	5	4	135	82	217	87	33	47	0.3	0.3	8.4	5.1	13.6	5.4	2.1	2.9	0
2025	Western Bulldogs	7	23	3	6	185	95	280	124	36	22	0.1	0.3	8.0	4.1	12.2	5.4	1.6	1.0	1
2026	Western Bulldogs	7	18	5	7	130	64	194	77	53	166	0.3	0.4	7.2	3.6	10.8	4.3	2.9	9.2	0
Career			217	180	132	1511	940	2451	933	455	1931	0.8	0.6	7.0	4.3	11.3	4.3	2.1	8.9	25
