= Lachie Hunter =

Australian rules footballer (born 1994)

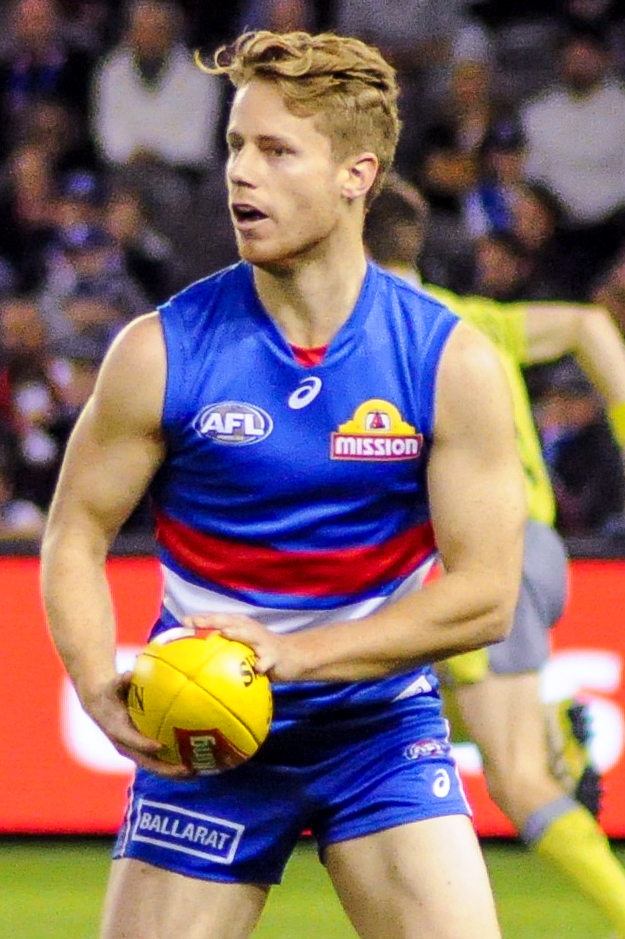
- Hunter playing for the Western Bulldogs in June 2017

Personal information
- Full name: Lachlan Hunter
- Born: 13 December 1994 (age 31)
- Original team: Williamstown Jnrs (Vic) / Western Jets (TAC Cup)
- Draft: No. 49 (father–son), 2012 national draft, Western Bulldogs
- Debut: Round 13, 2013, Western Bulldogs vs. Richmond, at Etihad Stadium
- Height: 183 cm (6 ft 0 in)
- Weight: 82 kg (181 lb)
- Position: Wingman / Midfielder / Forward

Playing career
Years	Club	Games (Goals)
2013–2022	Western Bulldogs	173 (73)
2023–2024	Melbourne	26 (7)
Total		199 (80)

Career highlights
- AFL premiership player (2016); Charles Sutton Medal: 2018; 22under22 team (2016); Rose–Sutton Medal (2015)

Lachlan Hunter (born 13 December 1994) is a former professional Australian rules footballer who played for the Western Bulldogs and Melbourne in the Australian Football League (AFL).

Hunter was drafted with the 49th selection in the 2012 AFL draft, and made his debut for the Western Bulldogs the following year. He is a Bulldogs premiership player, a former vice-captain, a Charles Sutton Medallist and Gary Dempsey Medallist, a winner of the Rose–Sutton Medal and a member of the 2016 22under22 team. He has placed in the top 10 of the Bulldogs best and fairest voting for five consecutive years.

== Early life ==
Hunter was born to former Western Bulldogs player Mark Hunter and former professional Lacrosse player Colleen Hunter (née McVeigh). Hunter played junior football for the Williamstown Juniors from the Under 9 divisions all the way until he finished the under 16 divisions. Hunter completed his schooling at St Kevin's College, where he played for the school team alongside future teammates Tom Liberatore and Mitch Wallis. He also played with the Western Jets in the TAC Cup program. He had signs of becoming a prominent player early on, kicking 3 goals and having 37 disposals in a game against the Eastern Ranges Football Club. Hunter also featured in the Under 18 Vic Metro team in the 2012 AFL Under 18 Championships, playing four out of five games and picking up an influential 23 disposals in the team's 96-point demolition of Tasmania in the 2nd round of the championships.

Hunter was recruited by the Western Bulldogs in the 2012 National Draft, with pick 49 under the father–son rule, as he was the son of Mark Hunter, who had played 130 games for the Bulldogs from 1988 to 1996, thus making him eligible for selection.

== AFL career ==
=== Western Bulldogs ===
In his debut year, Hunter played predominantly as a half-forward, usually named on the interchange. Hunter made his debut in Round 13, 2013, against Richmond at Etihad Stadium. Before his debut, then Bulldogs coach Brendan McCartney stated "He’s very creative, he just understands the game and when the ball is near him, good things happen – so we are looking forward to him debuting and going from there." In his debut game, Hunter collected 19 disposals, 5 marks, 2 behinds and kicked one goal with just his second kick in his AFL career. Hunter then played in all the remaining games for the season, except in the Bulldogs' 4- and 28-point victories over Greater Western Sydney and Carlton in Rounds 15 and 20. Hunter received a Mark of the Year nomination in the 21st round of the season after he took a Spectacular mark over teammate Tom Campbell and Adelaide player Ben Rutten. He finished the season with a disposal efficiency of 75.6% and an average of 13.2 disposals and 2.9 inside 50s per game. Hunter signed a contract extension that kept him at the club until 2016 in December 2013.

Hunter had another consistent season in 2014, playing 14 games. He had his best game for the season in the first round of the season in the Western Bulldogs' 65-point loss to West Coast, kicking 2 goals and a behind, as well as collecting 24 disposals, 5 marks and 4 tackles. Hunter received his second Mark of the Year nomination for his career, after his mark on Todd Goldstein in the Western Bulldogs' 29-point loss to North Melbourne in the 2nd round of the 2014 AFL season. Hunter finished the season averaging 14 disposals a game, with coach Brendan McCartney stating "He has displayed a range of admirable qualities in his short time at the Club and although Lachie’s best footy is still to come, we are pleased with the way he is tracking." Hunter was given the Number 7 guernsey, swapping his previous number, 26.

After a shaky start to the 2015 season, Hunter rapidly improved to secure a spot in the Western Bulldogs' finals team. Hunter received a club-imposed ban for being late to club training, resulting in him missing many of the opening rounds of the season. Hunter was moved to the wing towards the late end of the season and he quickly became central to the team's efforts, averaging 30 disposals from Round 17 to Round 23 when he made the move to the wing. In the 17th round of the season, Hunter won the Rose–Sutton Medal, which was awarded to the player who displays the most courage, skill, leadership and sportsmanship in games between the Western Bulldogs and Collingwood. In that game he was also named as best on ground, as he broke his career record for most disposals by 8, reaching a new record of 32. He also collected 1 goal, 10 marks and 10 scoring involvements, as well as 516 metres gained. He had his best game for the season the very next round, in the Western Bulldogs' 87-point demolition of Essendon. He collected 36 disposals, again breaking his career record for most disposals, and also kicked a behind, laid 4 tackles and took 6 marks. He was named as one of the Bulldogs' best on ground.

Hunter enjoyed a breakthrough season in 2016, cementing his place in the Bulldogs' senior team and enhancing a reputation as one of the league's most prolific wingmen. He played every game for the Bulldogs and at one stage in the season was considered in the running to make the All-Australian team. Hunter got his first above-40 disposal count, collecting 44 in the Western Bulldogs' 16-point loss to North Melbourne in the 10th round of the 2016 season, after he had to make up for the losses of important backmen Bob Murphy, Matthew Suckling and Jason Johannisen. Hunter also took 6 marks and made 4 clearances. An illegal tackle from North Melbourne player Lindsay Thomas saw Hunter go to hospital after the game with concussion-like symptoms, but he recovered in time for the next round. He also had good games in rounds 2 and 11, where he collected 35 and 38 disposals, and kicked a goal in both games. Hunter collected 85 disposals over the course of the 2016 AFL finals series, averaging around 21 disposals a game. He played in the Western Bulldogs' 62 year premiership drought-breaking team, collecting 19 disposals, 1 behind, 4 tackles and 1 mark. He finished the season as the club's leading disposal getter with 719 in total, averaging nearly 28 disposals per game, ranking him sixth overall in the AFL. He was ranked as the number one uncontested ball winner in the AFL, ending the year with 514 uncontested possessions. Hunter also came second at the club for inside 50s and equal third for goal assists. Hunter was recognized for his achievement when he finished third in the club's best and fairest count, winning the Gary Dempsey Medal. He also received 13 Brownlow votes.

Hunter played every game in the 2017 season, proving himself as one of the Western Bulldogs' key players. Hunter signed a new contract in April which kept him at the Bulldogs until the end of 2019. He had one of his best games for the season in the Western Bulldogs' 16-point loss to Fremantle in the 3rd round of the season, where he kicked the first 3 goals for the Bulldogs, collected 26 disposals, took 6 marks and had 4 inside-50s. He had a similarly good game in the Western Bulldogs' 14-point win against Collingwood in round 1 of the season, where he kicked 3 goals, collected 21 disposals, and took 6 marks and 2 tackles. He was named as one of the Western Bulldogs' best on ground. Hunter finished the season in 6th place in the Charles Sutton Medal count, gathering 125 votes, 60 votes behind first-placed Marcus Bontempelli. In November of that year, Hunter was elevated to the leadership group of the Bulldogs, alongside Jordan Roughead, Jack Redpath and Jason Johannisen.

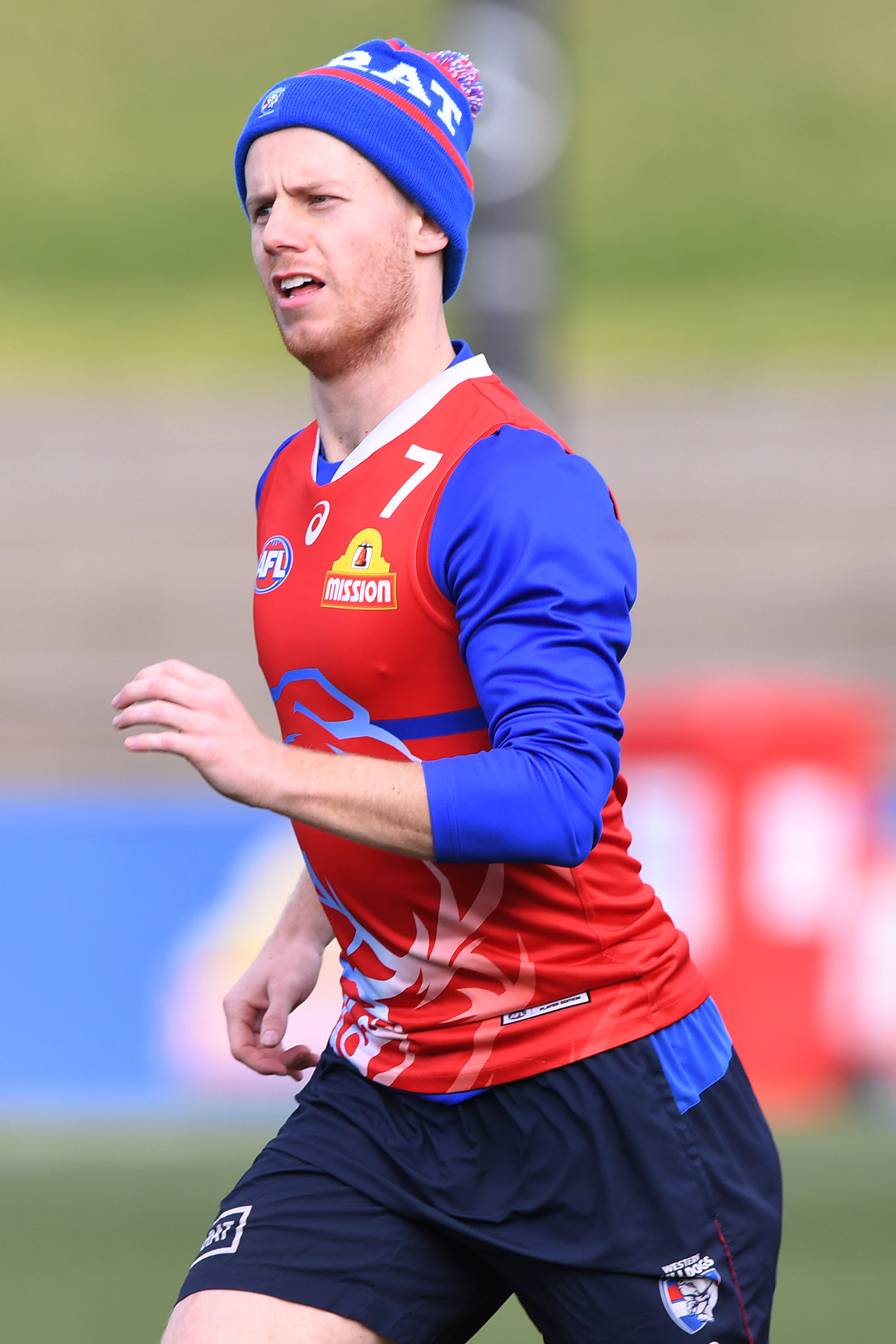
Lachie Hunter at training in 2018

The 2018 AFL season saw Hunter have one of his best seasons yet, obtaining the club's best and fairest award. In round 7, Hunter captained the Bulldogs in their 9-point win over Gold Coast in an AFL match, filling in for the injured captain and vice-captain Easton Wood and Marcus Bontempelli. Hunter, alongside Jack Macrae and Jason Johannisen, was named as best on ground for the Bulldogs, after gathering 34 disposals, 9 marks and 3 tackles. Hunter played his 100th game in the Bulldogs' 54-point loss to West Coast in the 18th round of the 2018 AFL season. He collected 28 disposals, took 5 marks and laid 4 tackles, named as one of the team's best on ground in the big loss. Hunter tied his career record for most disposals in a game in a standout performance in the Bulldogs' 7-point win over North Melbourne in round 21, getting 44 disposals. Hunter was rewarded with the Charles Sutton Medal at the end of the season. He collected 191 votes, just 1 vote ahead of second-placed Jack Macrae. Hunter led the club in marks and disposals for the total season, getting 117 and 626 respectively.

2019 was another consistent season for Hunter in his second year as a member of the team's leadership group, playing every game of the season, including the Bulldogs' elimination final loss to Greater Western Sydney. Hunter signed a major 5-year contract extension on 12 March 2019, tying him to the club until 2024. Hunter stated that "I’ve clearly wanted to play for this club my whole life, and to be able to do that over an extended period now is a really good feeling," Hunter was a crucial part of the Bulldogs' 8-point win over Melbourne in the 17th round of the 2019 AFL season, gathering 37 disposals, kicking a goal, taking 10 marks and laying 5 tackles, getting named in the Bulldogs' best for the game. Hunter also bolstered the Bulldogs' effort against Fremantle in Round 6 of the season, collecting 32 disposals, 8 marks and a goal. He was named as the Bulldogs' best on ground. Hunter finished in 6th place in the Charles Sutton Medal count, 138 votes behind first-placed Marcus Bontempelli. This made it his fourth consecutive year in a row getting named in the Top 10 of the best and fairest voting. In December 2019, Hunter was appointed the vice-captain of the Western Bulldogs, after previous vice-captain Marcus Bontempelli stepped up to the role of captaincy.

The 2020 AFL season was a chaotic one for Hunter, with drink-driving offences and personal issues pushing him out of the team, reducing him to a total of just 10 games played in the COVID-19 affected season. Hunter only vice-captained the Bulldogs for one game, the team's 52-point loss to Collingwood in the opening round of the season. In April 2020, after a drunk driving offence, he was suspended for four games and voluntarily relinquished the vice captaincy. He was also fined $5000 for drink driving and given suspended fines for offences involving breaching of social distancing. Hunter came back into the team for Rounds 6 and 7, and averaged 26.5 disposals and 4 marks per game, but then took a break for personal reasons, missing the next five rounds. Hunter had one of his best games for the season in his return to the team in Round 12, collecting 29 disposals, a goal and 6 marks in a game where he ruled out rumours of a trade, after grabbing his Bulldogs jumper in celebration at kicking a goal. Hunter was praised as one of the team's best players in the match. He had his best game for the season in the Bulldogs' season-defining 5-goal win over Fremantle in the final round of the home and away season, which saw the team obtain a place in the finals series. In this game, he collected 35 disposals, kicked 1 goal and 3 behinds, and took 7 marks. He was named the second best player for the Bulldogs, behind Tom Liberatore. Despite missing nearly half of the season, Hunter finished 9th in the Charles Sutton Medal voting at the conclusion of the season, with a total of 84 votes, 121 behind first-placed Caleb Daniel.

Hunter had a much different season in 2021 to his previous few, playing as a high half-forward due to the team's large amount of midfield depth. It was revealed that Hunter had played through the second half of the team's Round 8 win over Carlton with a broken hand, being lauded by teammate Josh Bruce and coach Luke Beveridge for his courage. He had surgery on his hand in the wake of his injury.

Hunter was traded to the Melbourne Football Club at the end of the 2022 AFL season.

=== Melbourne ===
Hunter made his debut with Melbourne in round 1 of the 2023 season, and went on to play 24 out of a possible 25 games in his first season at the club. However, Hunter only managed two senior games in 2024, and announced his retirement on the 26th of September 2024. Hunter ended his career on 199 AFL matches, across both clubs he played for.

== Personal life ==
Hunter is the cousin of Mark McVeigh and Jarrad McVeigh, who played for Essendon and Sydney respectively.

== Statistics ==
Legend
G	Goals	K	Kicks	D	Disposals	T	Tackles
B	Behinds	H	Handballs	M	Marks

Season	Team	No.	Games	Totals							Averages (per game)							Votes
Season	Team	No.	Games	G	B	K	H	D	M	T	G	B	K	H	D	M	T	Votes
2013	Western Bulldogs	26	9	4	4	66	53	119	25	16	0.4	0.4	7.3	5.9	13.2	2.8	1.8	0
2014	Western Bulldogs	26	14	9	13	126	72	198	51	37	0.6	0.9	9.0	5.1	14.1	3.6	2.6	0
2015	Western Bulldogs	7	13	3	5	147	140	287	64	28	0.2	0.4	11.3	10.8	22.1	4.9	2.2	2
2016^{#}	Western Bulldogs	7	26	10	14	391	328	719	146	66	0.4	0.5	15.0	12.6	27.7	5.6	2.5	13
2017	Western Bulldogs	7	22	18	9	302	195	497	115	56	0.8	0.4	13.7	8.9	22.6	5.2	2.5	2
2018	Western Bulldogs	7	21	8	10	343	283	626	117	58	0.4	0.5	16.3	13.5	29.8	5.6	2.8	9
2019	Western Bulldogs	7	23	5	9	332	279	611	150	53	0.2	0.4	14.4	12.1	26.6	6.5	2.3	5
2020 (Note: The 2020 season was played with 17 home-and-away matches per team (down from 22) and 16-minute quarters with time on (down from 20-minute quarters with time on) due to the impact of the COVID-19 pandemic.)	Western Bulldogs	7	10	4	8	137	117	254	54	22	0.4	0.8	13.7	11.7	25.4	5.4	2.2	6
2021	Western Bulldogs	7	25	10	7	326	220	546	125	60	0.4	0.3	13.0	8.8	21.8	5.0	2.4	0
2022	Western Bulldogs	7	10	2	5	118	77	195	54	26	0.2	0.5	11.8	7.7	19.5	5.4	2.6	0
2023	Melbourne	12	24	6	3	308	230	538	100	42	0.3	0.1	12.8	9.6	22.4	4.2	1.8	3
2024	Melbourne	12	2	1	0	18	9	27	6	0	0.5	0.0	9.0	4.5	13.5	3.0	0.0	0
2025	Melbourne	12	0	—	—	—	—	—	—	—	—	—	—	—	—	—	—	0
Career			199	80	87	2614	2003	4617	1007	464	0.4	0.4	13.1	10.1	23.2	5.1	2.3	40

== Honours and achievements ==
Team

- AFL premiership: 2016

Individual

- 22under22 team: 2016
- Gary Dempsey Medal: 2016
- Rose–Sutton Medal: 2015
- Charles Sutton Medal: 2018
