= Tom Liberatore =

Australian rules footballer (born 1992)

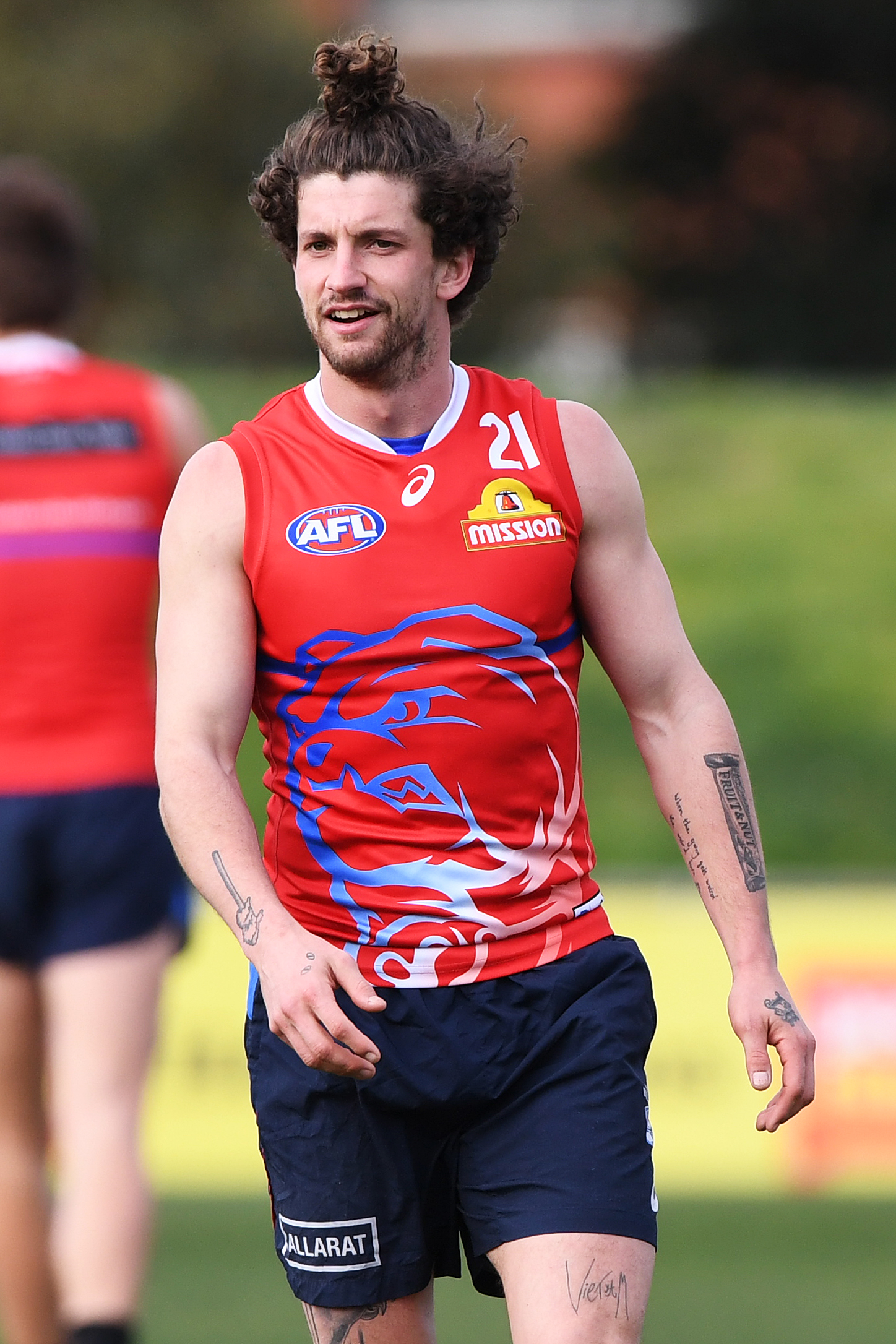
- Liberatore in August 2018

Personal information
- Full name: Thomas Francis Liberatore
- Nickname: Libba
- Born: 16 May 1992 (age 34); Melbourne, Victoria
- Original team: Calder Cannons (TAC Cup)/St Bernard's Football Club
- Draft: No. 40 (F/S), 2010 national draft
- Debut: 27 March 2011, Western Bulldogs vs. Essendon, at Docklands Stadium
- Height: 184 cm (6 ft 0 in)
- Weight: 85 kg (13 st 5 lb; 187 lb)
- Position: Midfielder

Playing career^{1}
Years	Club	Games (Goals)
2011–2026	Western Bulldogs	268 (93)
- ^{1} Playing statistics correct to the end of round 22, 2026.

Career highlights
- AFL premiership player (2016); Charles Sutton Medal (2014); 2× 22under22 team (2013, 2014); 3x Doug Hawkins Medal (2013, 2022, 2023); 2x Gary Dempsey Medal (2020, 2021)

Thomas Francis Liberatore (born 16 May 1992) is a former Australian rules footballer who played for the Western Bulldogs in the Australian Football League (AFL). At 1.84 m (6.0 ft) and 85 kg (187 lb), he plays as a contested ball-winning midfielder who applies high amounts of pressure. He is the eldest son of former Bulldogs player Tony Liberatore. He was born and raised in Melbourne, Victoria. While attending St Kevin's College he played top-level junior football with the Calder Cannons in the NAB League.

Liberatore was drafted with the 40th selection of the 2010 AFL draft. He made his AFL debut in the 2010 AFL season. Since then, Liberatore has been a AFL Premiership player, a Charles Sutton Medallist, a two-time Doug Hawkins Medallist, a two-time Gary Dempsey Medallist, a dual-member of the 22 Under 22 team, and the Western Bulldogs' vice-captain as of 2024. He has polled a total of 50 Brownlow Medal votes in his career.

== Early life and career ==
Liberatore was born in Melbourne, Victoria. He grew up in the suburb of Essendon and played junior football for St Bernard’s Football Club in the Western Region Football League. He was educated at St Kevin's College. The son of Tony Liberatore, former Western Bulldogs player and Brownlow Medallist, and mother Jane, he was the eldest of three children. He has a younger brother, Oliver, and a younger sister, Meg. Liberatore represented Victoria at under-16 level in 2008. Although he put time into cricket, playing with his school and St.Bernard's Cricket Club. He was eventually drafted to the Bulldogs from the Calder Cannons in the TAC Cup with the 40th selection in the 2010 AFL draft as a father–son selection, after Sydney nominated their intention to draft him with second-round pick if available. Fellow schoolmate and friend Mitch Wallis was also drafted ahead of Liberatore at pick 22, after the two had played together for St. Bernard's Junior Football Club, St Kevin's College and Calder Cannons since a young age. He graduated school with a 94 on his ATAR score.

He was selected in the junior All-Australian team after the 2010 NAB AFL Under-18 Championships, where he had averaged 22 disposals at 72 per cent efficiency, five clearances and four tackles. In the 2010 TAC Cup Grand Final, he had 28 disposals in the Cannons' 58-point defeat of Gippsland Power.

== AFL career ==
=== 2011—2014: Early career ===
Liberatore made his debut in the Western Bulldogs' round one defeat to Essendon, collecting 19 disposals, one behind and seven clearances in front of a 42,617 person crowd. Liberatore gathered 28 disposals in just his second senior game ever, also laying 10 tackles, a glimpse of the high pressure player he was going to become. The Western Bulldogs' 35 point win over Richmond in Round 8 showed the power Liberatore could bring to a game, after he collected 25 disposals, kicked two goals and laid six tackles. Liberatore played 16 games in his debut season, averaging over 18 possessions per game and winning the Chris Grant Best First Year Player Award after an 'impressive' debut season. Liberatore had a controversial 2012 season, being sanctioned by the club for drug offences after just 17 games for the season. Liberatore had one of his best games for the season in the Western Bulldogs' 38 point win over Gold Coast in round eight of the 2012 AFL season, kicking the team's opening goal and collecting 24 disposals and six tackles. Liberatore broke his record for most disposals in a game after a 29 disposal haul against the Brisbane Lions in Round 13 of the 2012 AFL season. On 5 August 2012, after a heavy loss to the Kangaroos in Round 19, Liberatore was found by police unconscious on King Street and was questioned about drug offences relating to the possession of what was believed to be ecstasy. He was subsequently suspended for the remainder of the season by the Bulldogs. In addition, he was issued a $5,000 suspended fine, required to undergo club-driven counselling and education, and be engaged in full-time employment for the following six weeks. Liberatore issued a public apology for his actions. Despite missing out on five games, Liberatore came 7th in the Charles Sutton Medal voting and polled 81 votes, 87 votes behind winner Matthew Boyd.

Liberatore improved in the following season, establishing himself as one of the AFL's most statistically dominant inside midfielders; he ranked first in the league for clearances and second in contested possessions, behind only Sydney's Josh Kennedy. Liberatore had one of his career-best games against Melbourne in the final round of the 2013 AFL season, kicking one goal, collecting 26 disposals, and 11 tackles, just one tackle off his record at the time. He was named as best on ground for that game. He also had another best on ground performance against Essendon, collecting 33 disposals, a goal, 6 tackles and 4 marks. Liberatore signed a three-year contract extension with the Bulldogs in August, tying him to the club until 2016. He was recognized for his impressive efforts for the season with selection in the AFL Players' Association's inaugural 22 Under 22 team. He was named as a follower alongside Tom Nicholls and Jaeger O'Meara. He also claimed the Doug Hawkins Medal (best and fairest runner up), after polling 242 votes, just 31 votes behind winner Ryan Griffen. He won the Tony Liberatore Most Improved Player award at the Bulldogs' best-and-fairest count, and also polled 14 votes at the Brownlow Medal count.

While 2014 was considered a tumultuous one for the Western Bulldogs, Liberatore continued his outstanding individual form, registering over 500 possessions for the second consecutive season and leading the league in tackles, tallying up an astonishing 173 tackles throughout the season, while also leading in clearances, finishing with a total of 156. Liberatore had an outstanding performance against Melbourne in round eight of the 2014 AFL season, kicking two goals, collecting 27 disposals and getting a career-high 14 tackles. He also had a great game against Collingwood in Round 13, leading the game in tackles (10), contested possessions (23), and disposals (34). Liberatore was recognised for having his most successful season yet, winning his first Charles Sutton Medal. He polled 235 votes, a 67 votes ahead of second placed Jack Macrae. He also won a plethora of other club awards, including the Scott West Most Courageous Player Award, the John Van Groningen Team First Award, and the Brad Johnson Best Team Player. He was also named in the initial 40 man squad of the 2014 All-Australian team. Coach Brendan McCartney praised his efforts at the end of the season, stating "He's tough, he uses the ball well, he defends and he cares deeply about this club and he's a fighter."

=== 2015—2019: Injuries and premiership glory ===
Liberatore had an unfortunate 2015 AFL season, missing the entire season due to a shock knee injury after Richmond player Ty Vickery tackled him and his leg buckled under the weight of the tackle in the Western Bulldogs's 22 point victory over Richmond in Round 1 of the 2015 pre-season. In May 2015, he signed a contract extension that kept him tied to the Bulldogs until the end of the 2018 season.

Liberatore was a key driving force in the 2016 AFL season as the Bulldogs broke their 62-year premiership drought, playing 21 games over the course of the season. Liberatore kicked 14 goals over the course of the season, the most goals he kicked in a season. Liberatore tied the AFL record for most tackles in one game in the Western Bulldogs's 32 point victory against Melbourne in the 8th round of the 2016 AFL season, collecting an astonishing 19 tackles over the course of the game due to the absence of running half-backs such as Bob Murphy and Jason Johannisen. His record has only been matched by Jack Ziebell and Jude Bolton. Coach Luke Beveridge lauded his efforts after the game, stating "We're not a huge tackling side because we are a high possession side, but that was almost a quarter of our tackles I think. It's quite extraordinary, in particular his third and fourth efforts." Liberatore also had a great game against Port Adelaide in the 12th round of the season, gaining 24 disposals, one goal, eight tackles and 13 clearances. He went down with a syndesmosis injury in the Western Bulldogs's 25 point loss to Geelong in the 19th round of the 2016 season, alongside teammate Jack Macrae who suffered a hamstring injury. To get him fit for the finals series, doctors used a rarely-used strategy involving the insertion of surgical string into his ankle in order to aid the recovery of his ankle at a quicker pace. He played every game in the 2016 finals series, during that time collecting a total of 79 disposals, 22 tackles, 23 clearances and 5 marks. Liberatore played in the 2016 AFL Grand Final despite an ankle injury suffered in the preliminary final the previous week, during his celebrations. Just before the beginning of the Grand Final, he realised he had forgotten his boots, and had to get his housemate to retrieve them for him. Liberatore just missed out on the Top 3 of the Charles Sutton Medal voting, placing 4th behind winner Marcus Bontempelli, runner up Dale Morris and third placed Lachie Hunter. He also won the Scott West Most Courageous Player Award.

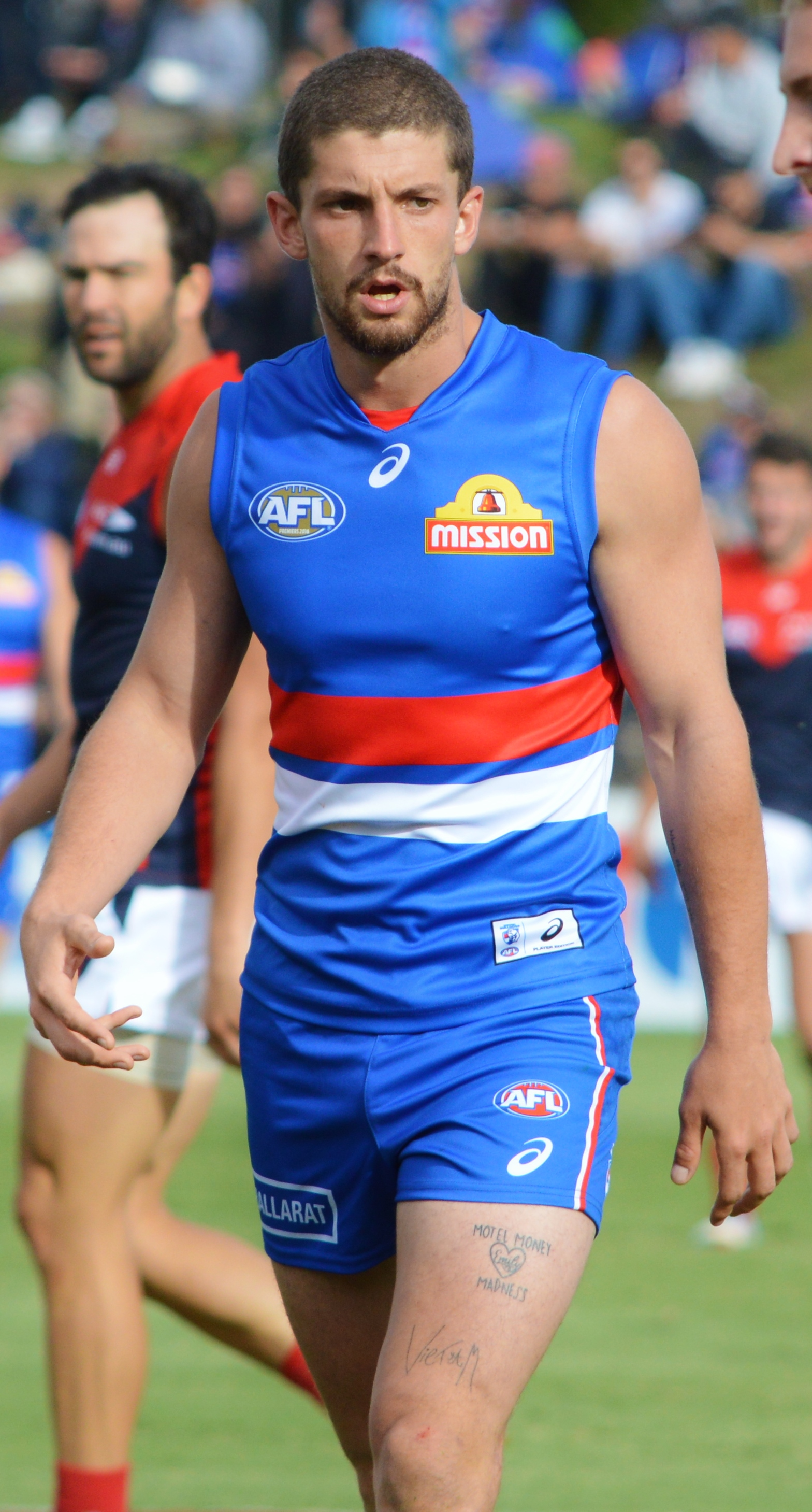
Tom Liberatore during a pre-season match against Melbourne in 2017

Liberatore's form dropped off in what was to be a disappointing 2017 season for both him and the Western Bulldogs. Playing 18 games, Liberatore averaged much lower amounts of kicks, handballs, disposals, marks and goals then he had in all previous years, and critics described his season as disappointing. Before this slump in form however, Liberatore started off the season with four solid games, getting a total of 47 tackles, 77 disposals and 2 goals. However, after these first four games he entered a period of poor form, only reaching 20 or more disposals five more times for the rest of the season. Liberatore's pressure was one of the few things keeping him in the team, averaging 6.5 tackles per game, the second best season for tackles in his career. That wasn't enough for him to keep his spot in the team, and was dropped due to an incredibly poor eight disposal game against West Coast in the 8th round of the 2017 AFL season, after which coach Luke Beveridge decided he needed some time in the VFL. Liberatore did not make the Top 10 of the Charles Sutton Medal voting for only the third time in his career, missing out in his debut season and in 2015.

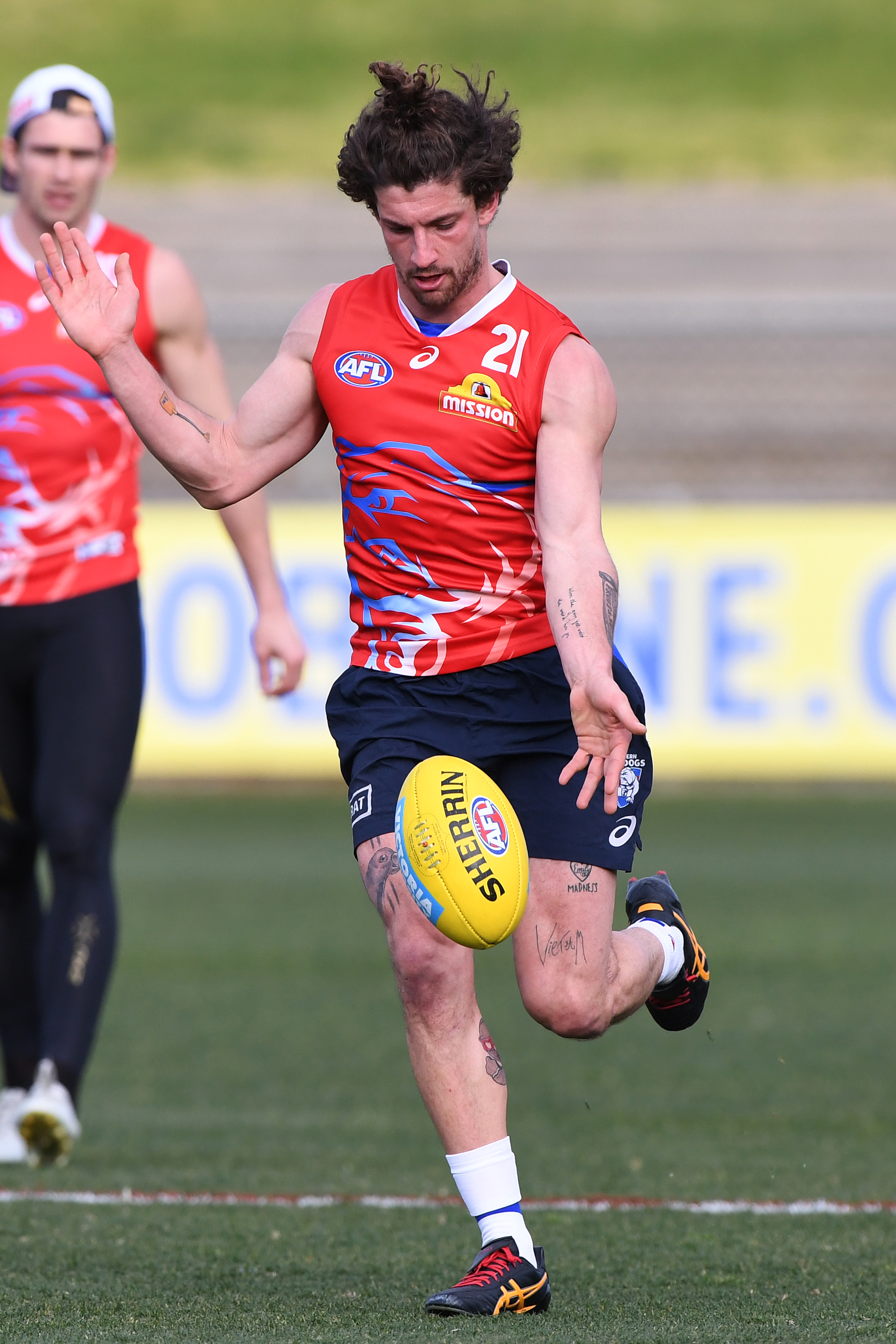
Tom Liberatore at training in August 2018

Liberatore had another hapless season in 2018, after he suffered a season-ending anterior cruciate ligament injury to his right knee in the Western Bulldogs' 82 point loss to Greater Western Sydney in the opening round of the season. The club confirmed that he would sit out the entire season the next day. During his rehabilitation, he took time to engage in other activities outside of football. Liberatore signed a one-year contract extension at the conclusion of the season.

2019 was another mediocre season for Liberatore, despite the Bulldogs making finals for the first time since 2016. Liberatore played 16 games, missing eight throughout the season. Liberatore played every game until a cartilage injury to his knee in the Western Bulldogs' nail-biting three-point victory over Carlton in the 13th round of the 2020 AFL season saw him miss rounds 14–17, before returning in round 18. Despite initial fears that the injury was a second Anterior cruciate ligament injury, it was cleared as a more minor injury. He had one of his best games for the season in the Western Bulldogs's 5 point loss against Gold Coast in the third round after a solid start to the season, where he collected 30 disposals, 9 tackles and 12 clearances, named the Bulldogs' second best behind Marcus Bontempelli. He also had another great game against Hawthorn the previous round, collecting 28 disposals, one goal and seven tackles. He was named as one of their best on ground. For the third year in a row, Liberatore did not reach the top 10 of the Charles Sutton Medal voting. He signed a two-year contract extension which kept him at the club until at least the end of 2021.

=== 2020—2026: Return to form ===
Liberatore began to improve upon his form after a chaotic year for the AFL due to the impact of the COVID-19 pandemic. He missed out on the first two rounds of the 2020 AFL season with knee soreness, the Bulldogs not taking any chances after Liberatore's history with knee injuries. Liberatore missed the first two rounds, but came back in for the team's four goal win over Greater Western Sydney in the third round of the season. In that game he kicked a goal after the siren at three quarter time and collected 18 disposals. A season best game in the Western Bulldogs' six goal victory against Hawthorn in the 17th round of the season came with a 28 disposal, nine tackle performance despite the 16 minute quarters as a result of rule changes brought about by the COVID-19 Pandemic. He was named as one of the team's best on ground. He also played a similarly impressive game in the final round of the home and away season which saw him named the Bulldogs' best on ground, gathering 25 disposals, 8 tackles and 7 clearances. Liberatore collected multiple awards at the conclusion of the season, including the Gary Dempsey Medal for third place in the Charles Sutton Medal voting, where he finished 45 votes behind winner Caleb Daniel and 30 votes behind captain Marcus Bontempelli. He also won the John Van Groningen Domestique Award, which honours the player who puts the team above all else on the field. Liberatore obtained the Brad Johnson Best Team Player Award for the second time in his career.

The 2021 AFL season saw Liberatore reach his best form since the 2014 season. Liberatore played his 150th game in the team's thrilling seven-point victory over West Coast in round 2. Just three weeks into the season, it was revealed that Liberatore was second in the league for generating scores, behind West Coast ruckman Nic Naitanui. He was named one of the Bulldogs' finest players in their win over Greater Western Sydney, their sixth consecutive victory of the season. His two goals late in the game helped seal the victory for the Bulldogs. Liberatore had 13 clearances and 27 disposals in the team's round eight comeback win against Carlton, helping propel the team to a win–loss record of 7-1. It was revealed Liberatore signed on with the Western Bulldogs for two years on 7 July 2021, tying him to the club until the end of the 2023 season.

Liberatore was named the Western Bulldogs vice-captain in 2024 after a vote by his teammates.

On 8 September 2026, Liberatore announced his retirement from Australian rules football.

== Personal life ==
Liberatore has one child, born in 2020. He has volunteered for a charity called Ladder, which aims to improve life for young people in Australia by working with AFL players to mentor young people. He also was going through the process of setting up an app called "Busket", which aims to help buskers in the city, in order to help reduce homelessness. Liberatore studied creative writing at RMIT University, and has publicly stated his admiration of the writing of Hunter S. Thompson in his studies. Liberatore owns two pubs in Melbourne: the Ascot Vale Hotel and the Mona Castle Hotel.

== Statistics ==
Updated to the end of round 22, 2026.

Legend
G	Goals	K	Kicks	D	Disposals	T	Tackles
B	Behinds	H	Handballs	M	Marks

Season	Team	No.	Games	Totals							Averages (per game)							Votes
Season	Team	No.	Games	G	B	K	H	D	M	T	G	B	K	H	D	M	T	Votes
2011	Western Bulldogs	21	16	4	1	119	174	293	30	77	0.3	0.1	7.4	10.9	18.3	1.9	4.8	0
2012	Western Bulldogs	21	17	4	1	179	172	351	64	65	0.2	0.1	10.5	10.1	20.6	3.8	3.8	0
2013	Western Bulldogs	21	22	3	3	285	286	571	66	137	0.1	0.1	13.0	13.0	26.0	3.0	6.2	14
2014	Western Bulldogs	21	22	7	5	244	278	522	61	173	0.3	0.2	11.1	12.6	23.7	2.8	7.9	5
2015	Western Bulldogs	21	0	—	—	—	—	—	—	—	—	—	—	—	—	—	—	0
2016	Western Bulldogs	21	21	14	3	172	257	429	46	114	0.7	0.1	8.2	12.2	20.4	2.2	5.4	1
2017	Western Bulldogs	21	18	7	4	101	209	310	36	116	0.4	0.2	5.6	11.6	17.2	2.0	6.4	0
2018	Western Bulldogs	21	1	0	0	2	1	3	0	0	0.0	0.0	2.0	1.0	3.0	0.0	0.0	0
2019	Western Bulldogs	21	15	6	8	139	175	314	41	59	0.4	0.5	9.3	11.7	20.9	2.7	3.9	0
2020 (Note: The 2020 season was played with 17 home-and-away matches per team (down from 22) and 16-minute quarters with time on (down from 20-minute quarters with time on) due to the impact of the COVID-19 pandemic.)	Western Bulldogs	21	16	5	3	150	182	332	31	57	0.3	0.2	9.4	11.4	20.8	1.9	3.6	2
2021	Western Bulldogs	21	25	14	12	285	313	598	65	135	0.6	0.5	11.4	12.5	23.9	2.6	5.4	4
2022	Western Bulldogs	21	22	9	8	254	290	544	68	104	0.4	0.4	11.5	13.2	24.7	3.1	4.7	7
2023	Western Bulldogs	21	21	8	9	266	308	574	59	141	0.4	0.4	12.7	14.7	27.3	2.8	6.7	17
2024	Western Bulldogs	21	18	4	8	190	238	428	50	100	0.2	0.4	10.6	13.2	23.8	2.8	5.6	10
2025	Western Bulldogs	21	23	6	8	296	313	609	85	128	0.3	0.3	12.9	13.6	26.5	3.7	5.6	12
2026	Western Bulldogs	21	11	2	2	104	127	231	28	40	0.2	0.2	10.4	12.7	23.1	2.8	4.0	0
Career			268	93	75	2786	3323	6109	730	1446	0.3	0.3	10.4	12.4	22.9	2.7	5.4	72

== Honours and achievements ==
Brownlow Medal votes
Season	Votes
2011	—
2012	—
2013	14
2014	5
2015	—
2016	1
2017	—
2018	—
2019	—
2020	2
2021	4
2022	7
2023	17
2024	10
2025	12
Total	79

AFL

- Team
  - AFL premiership: 2016
- Individual
  - Charles Sutton Medal (Western Bulldogs B&F): 2014
  - 2x Scott West Most Courageous Award - Western Bulldogs : 2014, 2016
  - Doug Hawkins Medal - Western Bulldogs: 2013
  - Gary Dempsey Medal - Western Bulldogs: 2020
  - Western Bulldogs Tony Liberatore Most Improved Player Award: 2013
  - Chris Grant Medal - Western Bulldogs Best First Year Player: 2011
  - John Van Groningen Domestique Award - Western Bulldogs: 2020
  - 2x Brad Johnson Best Team Player - Western Bulldogs: 2014, 2020

TAC Cup

- Team
  - 2× TAC Cup premiers - Calder Cannons : 2009, 2010
