= Toby McLean =

Australian rules footballer

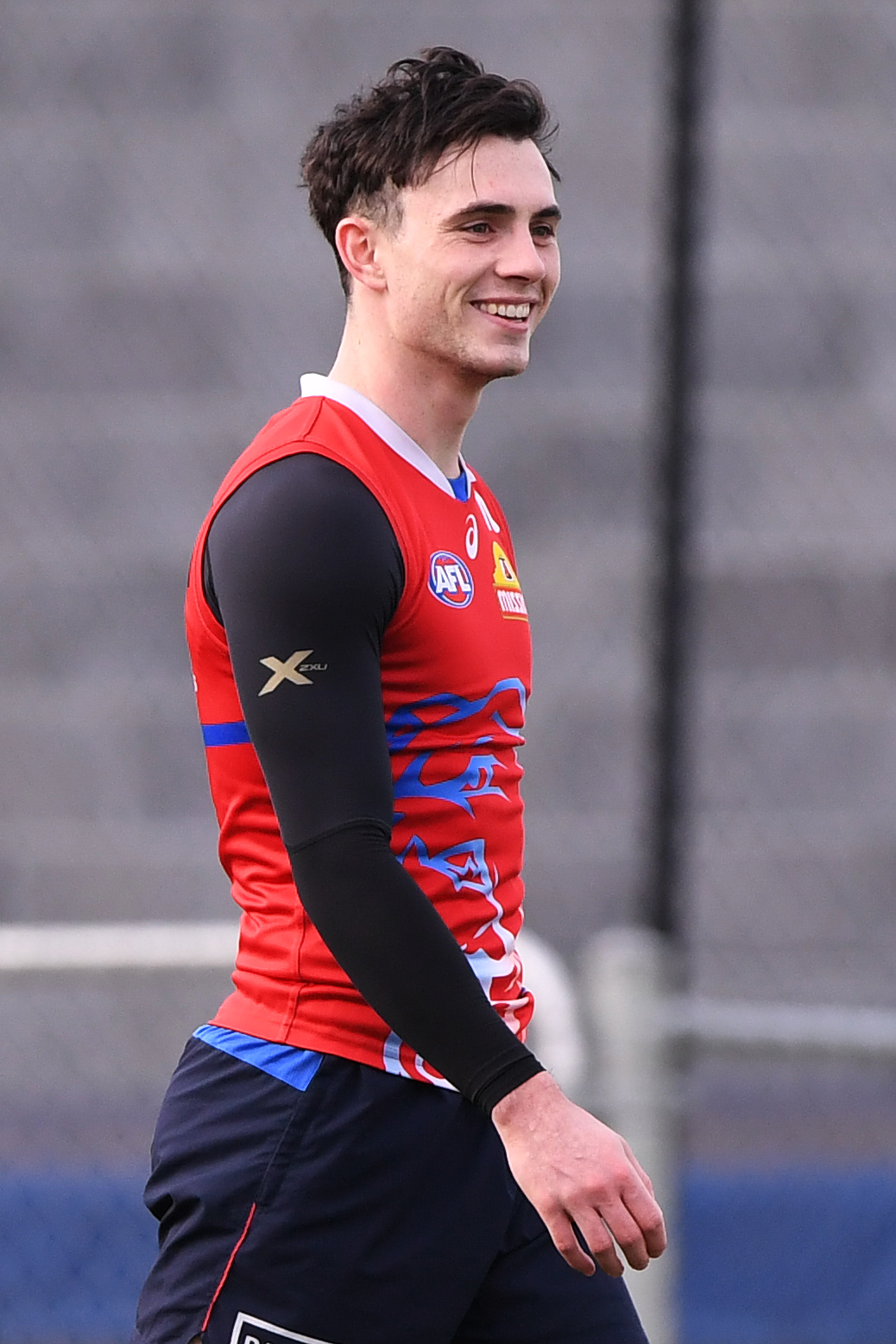
- McLean in August 2018

Personal information
- Full name: Toby McLean
- Born: 31 January 1996 (age 30)
- Original team: Oakleigh Chargers (TAC Cup)/Narre Warren FNC
- Draft: No. 26, 2014 National Draft, Western Bulldogs
- Height: 185 cm (6 ft 1 in)
- Weight: 79 kg (174 lb)
- Position: Small forward/midfielder

Playing career^{1}
Years	Club	Games (Goals)
2015–2023	Western Bulldogs	102 (62)
- ^{1} Playing statistics correct to the end of Round 3, 2021.

Career highlights
- AFL premiership player (2016)

Toby McLean (born 31 January 1996) is a former professional Australian rules footballer who played for the Western Bulldogs in the Australian Football League (AFL). He was selected in the 2014 National Draft with pick 26.

In 2014, McLean was named the best on ground in the TAC Cup grand final.

In 2016, McLean played in the Western Bulldogs premiership side. He collected 18 touches and kicked a goal. McLean had the final kick of the game, scoring a behind virtually on the siren.

In the 2020 and 2021 AFL seasons, McLean provided haircuts in the hub to star Bulldogs players including Adam Treloar, Bailey Dale, Ed Richards, Jamarra Ugle Hagan and Jordon Sweet. He is a Cert III Qualified Barber with an Instagram account titled @tobiaas_trims.

McLean suffered an injury to his anterior cruciate ligament in the 17th round of the 2020 AFL season, causing him to be ruled out of the team for 2021. He suffered a second ACL injury to the same knee in 2021, ruling him out until late 2022. He played in the 2022 elimination final 13-point loss to Fremantle collecting 21 disposals, 9 tackles and 100 AFL fantasy points.

In 2024, McLean was appointed midfield coach for the Western Bulldogs AFLW side.

== Statistics ==
Statistics are correct to round 23, 2021

Legend
G	Goals	K	Kicks	D	Disposals	T	Tackles
B	Behinds	H	Handballs	M	Marks

Season	Team	No.	Games	Totals							Averages (per game)						
Season	Team	No.	Games	G	B	K	H	D	M	T	G	B	K	H	D	M	T
2015	Western Bulldogs	16	4	2	0	28	34	62	18	6	0.5	0.0	7.0	8.5	15.5	4.5	1.5
2016^{#}	Western Bulldogs	16	15	14	11	135	125	260	60	38	0.9	0.7	9.0	8.3	17.3	4.0	2.5
2017	Western Bulldogs	16	19	13	12	179	247	426	60	86	0.7	0.6	9.4	13.0	22.4	3.2	4.5
2018	Western Bulldogs	16	22	11	13	233	292	525	85	126	0.5	0.6	10.6	13.3	23.9	3.9	5.7
2019	Western Bulldogs	16	19	14	10	142	156	298	72	62	0.7	0.5	7.5	8.2	15.7	3.8	3.2
2020 (Note: The 2020 season was played with 17 home-and-away matches per team (down from 22) and 16-minute quarters with time on (down from 20-minute quarters with time on) due to the impact of the COVID-19 pandemic.)	Western Bulldogs	16	12	6	4	57	108	165	16	45	0.5	0.3	4.8	9.0	13.8	1.3	3.8
2021	Western Bulldogs	16	3	2	2	17	25	42	9	13	0.7	0.7	5.7	8.3	14	3	4.3
Career			94	62	52	791	987	1778	320	376	0.7	0.6	8.1	10.3	18.4	3.3	4.0

== Honours and achievements ==
AFL

- Team
  - AFL premiership: 2016

TAC Cup

- Team
  - TAC Cup premiers & Best on Ground - Oakleigh Chargers: 2014
