= Tom Boyd (Australian footballer) =

Australian rules footballer

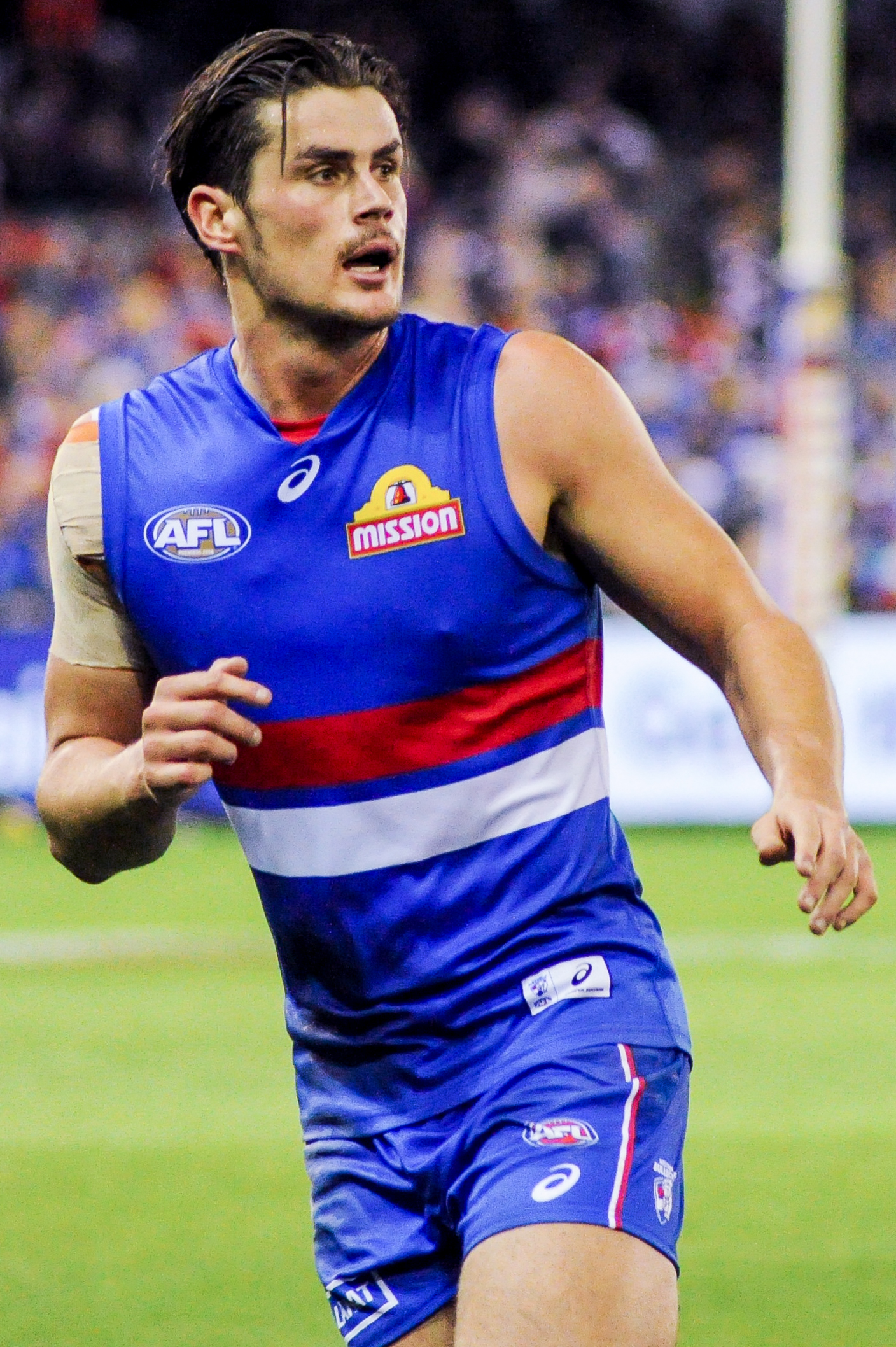
- Boyd playing for the Western Bulldogs in June 2017

Personal information
- Full name: Thomas Boyd
- Born: 22 August 1995 (age 31)
- Original teams: Eastern Ranges (TAC Cup); Norwood (EFL)
- Draft: No. 1, 2013 national draft
- Height: 200 cm (6 ft 7 in)
- Weight: 103 kg (227 lb)
- Position: Key forward / ruckman

Playing career^{1}
Years	Club	Games (Goals)
2014	Greater Western Sydney	9 (8)
2015–2019	Western Bulldogs	52 (42)
Total		61 (50)
- ^{1} Playing statistics correct to the end of 2019.

Career highlights
- AFL premiership player: 2016; AFL Rising Star nominee: 2015

Thomas Boyd (born 22 August 1995) is a former professional Australian rules footballer. He was selected with the first overall pick in the 2013 AFL draft by the Greater Western Sydney Giants, but was traded to the Western Bulldogs following the 2014 season. In 2016, he helped the Bulldogs win their first premiership since 1954. After struggling with injuries and mental health, Boyd retired from AFL football in May 2019.

== Early life ==
Boyd attended Luther College in Croydon Hills, Victoria and played junior football for the Norwood Football Club.

Playing for Eastern Ranges in the TAC Cup from 2011 to 2013, Boyd was the competition's leading goal kicker in 2012 and later performed well for Vic Metro at the 2012 national carnival.

In April 2013, Boyd visited Copenhagen in his mother's native Denmark for three days as part of the AIS-AFL Academy tour.

== AFL career ==
=== GWS Giants (2014) ===
Boyd was selected with the first overall pick in the 2013 AFL draft by the Greater Western Sydney Giants. In his reserves debut on 1 March 2014, Boyd kicked three goals and demonstrated his versatility with a stint in the ruck. He went on to make his senior debut on 20 April 2014 in the Giants' 137–72 loss to the Adelaide Crows; he managed just five disposals and didn't score. He finished the 2014 season with eight goals in nine games.

=== Western Bulldogs (2015–2019) ===
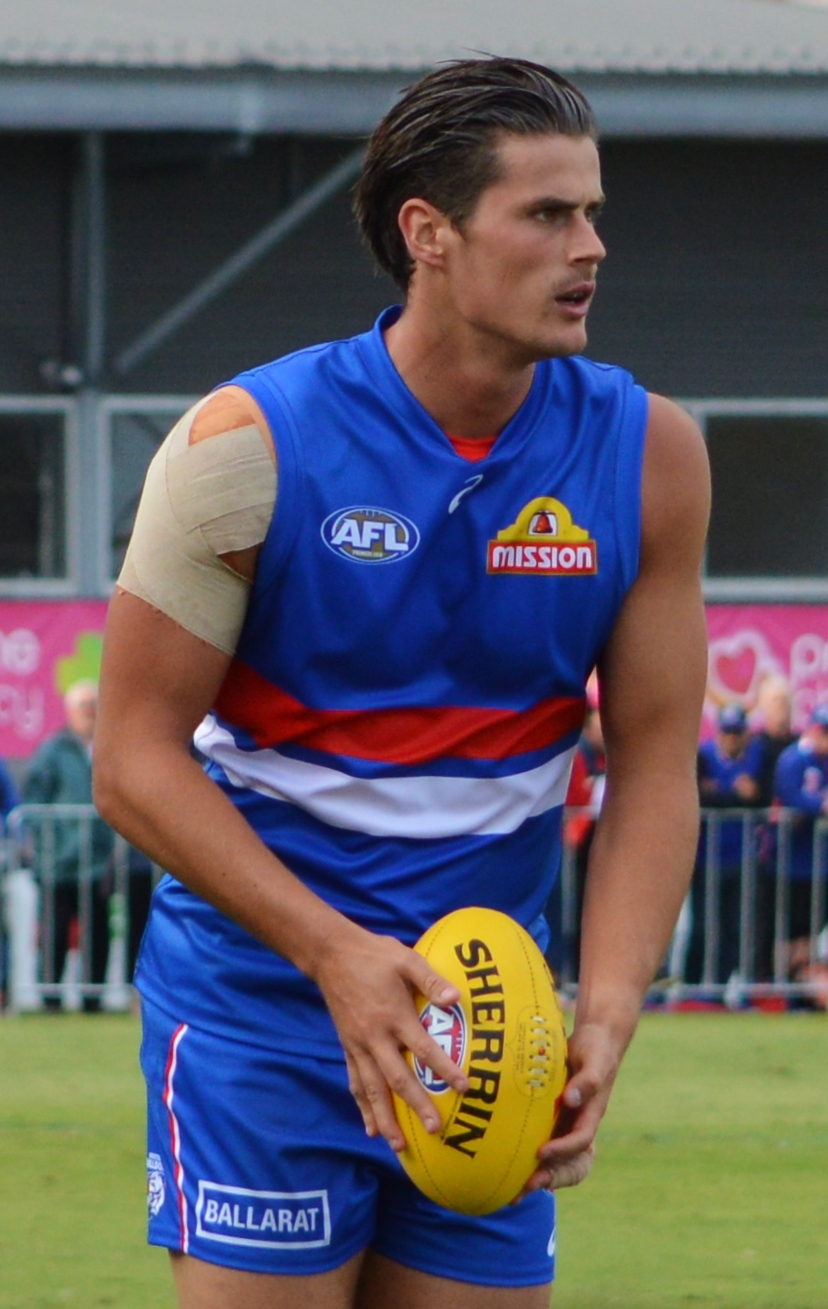
Boyd playing for the Bulldogs in a pre-season match in February 2017

==== Trade request ====
After the 2014 session, Boyd requested a trade to the Western Bulldogs. Despite the Giants' initial stance that Boyd would not be traded under any circumstance, the clubs agreed to a trade of Boyd for Ryan Griffen and pick 6 in the 2014 AFL draft. He signed a seven-year, $7 million contract with the Bulldogs.

==== 2015 season ====
In his debut game for the Bulldogs on 4 April 2015, Boyd was well-held by Eagle Jeremy McGovern but managed to kick an important late goal to help his new club secure a Round 1 win over the West Coast Eagles. On 22 June 2015, he earned the AFL's Rising Star nomination for Round 12 after kicking four goals and recording eight marks in a win over the Brisbane Lions. Following a poor showing in the Bulldogs' Round 16 game against Geelong, Boyd was dropped from the senior squad and failed to be recalled to the AFL level for the rest of the season, playing out the year with the team's VFL side. He helped Footscray reach the VFL finals, kicking two goals in the team's semi-final loss to Essendon.

==== 2016 season ====
Boyd's right shoulder was a constant problem for him throughout the 2016 season after he first aggravated it in the club's round four game against Carlton. The injury kept him on the sidelines for much of the first half of the season, after which he returned with the Bulldogs' VFL side, Footscray. He was in line to receive a recall to the AFL side for Round 15, but a drunken, "violent" altercation with teammate Zaine Cordy set him back. He was suspended indefinitely by the club on 30 June 2016 and fined $5,000. Boyd responded with a four-goal haul in Footscray's 12-point loss to Coburg on July 2. He returned to the AFL side in Round 17 and remained there for the rest of the year. He showed promise when he kicked three goals in the Bulldogs' loss to Geelong in Round 19. He went on to help the Bulldogs reach their first VFL/AFL grand final since 1961. In the 2016 Grand Final, Boyd completed a coming-of-age finals series with his highly influential aerial work, finishing the match with eight marks (six contested) and three goals. His third goal late in the fourth quarter from the centre square sealed the win for the Bulldogs, defeating the Sydney Swans by 22 points to become the first team to win a premiership from seventh on the ladder.

==== 2017 season ====
Despite enjoying a breakthrough finals series in 2016, Boyd struggled to reproduce that form in 2017. Coach Luke Beveridge admitted he saw Boyd as a ruckman more than a key forward at this stage of his career. He kicked seven goals from 11 games, and averaged 20 hit-outs a game, before enduring a poor run of injury, missing round 12 with a back injury and rounds 14 and 15 with a calf injury. On 5 July 2017, Boyd was provided a leave of absence from the Bulldogs to receive treatment for clinical depression.

==== 2018 season ====
Boyd's 2018 season was cut short by a back injury, as he was ruled out for the rest of the season after round 18.

==== 2019 season ====
On 16 May 2019, having not played at the top level since round 18 in 2018 amid battles with injury and mental health, Boyd announced his immediate retirement from the AFL. Over his AFL career, he never played more than 15 games in a season.

== Statistics ==
Legend
G	Goals	K	Kicks	D	Disposals	T	Tackles
B	Behinds	H	Handballs	M	Marks	H/O	Hit-outs

Season	Team	No.	Games	Totals								Averages (per game)							
Season	Team	No.	Games	G	B	K	H	D	M	T	H/O	G	B	K	H	D	M	T	H/O
2014	Greater Western Sydney	13	9	8	3	31	24	55	23	9	26	0.9	0.3	3.4	2.7	6.1	2.6	1.0	2.9
2015	Western Bulldogs	17	14	16	6	74	41	115	47	33	41	1.1	0.4	5.3	2.9	8.2	3.4	2.4	2.9
2016^{#}	Western Bulldogs	17	15	13	12	82	98	180	49	39	127	0.9	0.8	5.5	6.5	12.0	3.3	2.6	8.5
2017	Western Bulldogs	17	11	7	3	49	76	125	26	25	220	0.6	0.3	4.4	6.9	11.4	2.4	2.3	20.0
2018	Western Bulldogs	17	12	6	4	64	69	133	27	29	204	0.5	0.3	5.3	5.8	11.1	2.3	2.4	17.0
Career			61	50	28	300	308	608	172	135	618	0.8	0.5	4.9	5.0	10.0	2.8	2.2	10.1

== Honours and achievements ==
AFL

- Team
  - AFL premiership player: 2016
- Individual
  - AFL Rising Star nominee: 2015

TAC Cup

- Team
  - TAC Cup premiership player: 2013

== Personal life ==
Boyd has an Australian father, Geoff, and a Danish mother, Anita.

Boyd studied a Bachelor of Business at Victoria University, Melbourne.
