= 2016 AFL Grand Final =

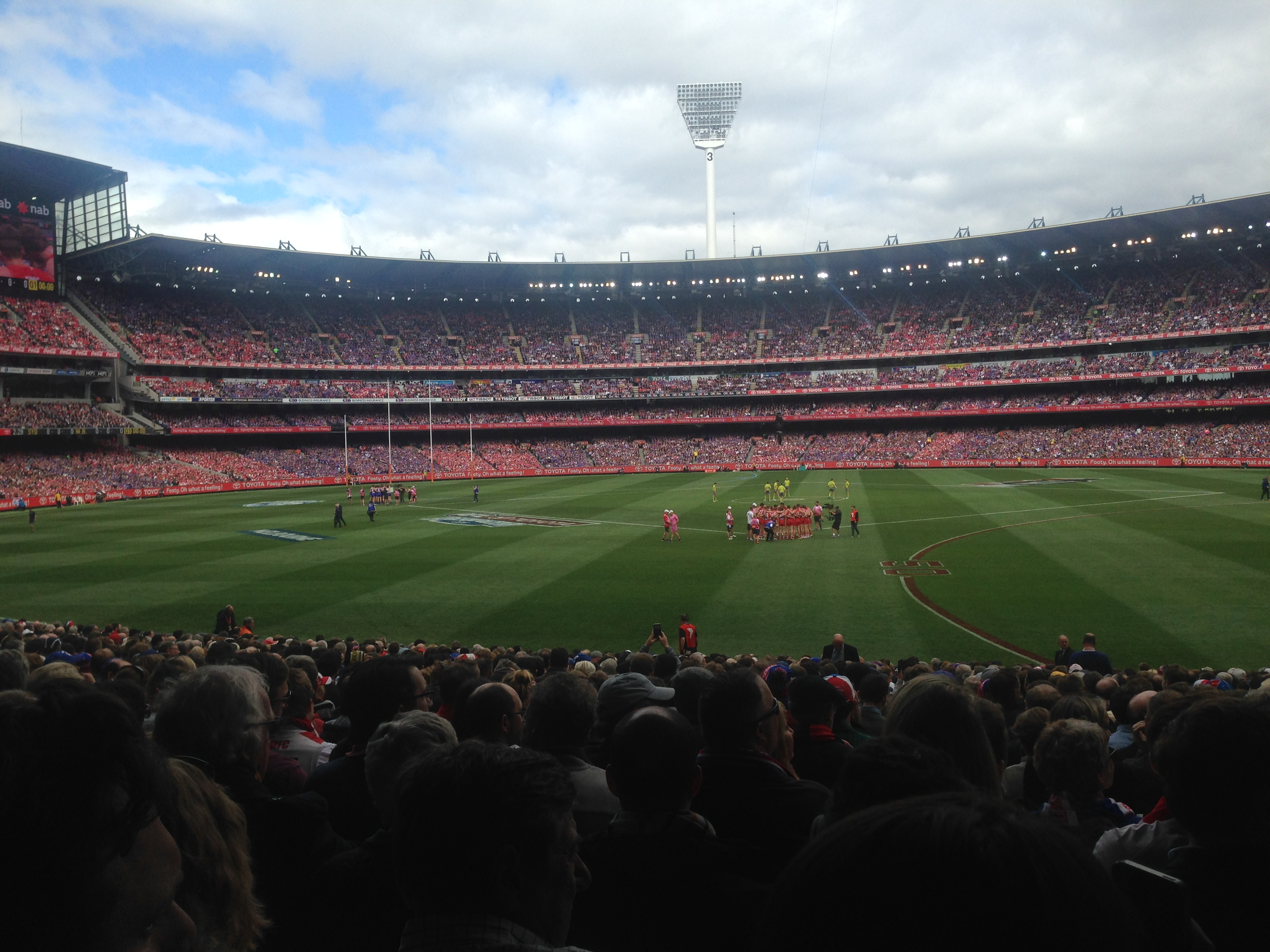
- The two teams in their huddles prior to the first bounce

| Sydney | Western Bulldogs |
|---|---|
| 10.7 (67) | 13.11 (89) |
| | 1 | 2 | 3 | 4 |
|---|---|---|---|---|
| SYD | 1.2 (8) | 7.3 (45) | 8.5 (53) | 10.7 (67) |
| WBD | 2.0 (12) | 7.1 (43) | 9.7 (61) | 13.11 (89) |
- Date: 1 October 2016, 2.30 pm
- Stadium: Melbourne Cricket Ground
- Attendance: 99,981
- Favourite: Sydney
- Umpires: Matt Stevic, Simon Meredith, Scott Jeffery
- Coin toss won by: Western Bulldogs
- Kicked toward: City End

Ceremonies
- Pre-match entertainment: Sting, The Living End, Vance Joy, Mike Brady
- National anthem: Vika and Linda Bull
- Post-match entertainment: The Living End, Vance Joy

Accolades
- Norm Smith Medallist: Jason Johannisen
- Jock McHale Medallist: Luke Beveridge

Broadcast in Australia
- Network: Seven Network
- Commentators: Bruce McAvaney (host and commentator); Hamish McLachlan (host); Dennis Cometti (commentator); Cameron Ling (expert commentator); Wayne Carey (expert commentator); Matthew Richardson (boundary rider); Tim Watson (boundary rider); Leigh Matthews (analyst); Luke Hodge (analyst)

The 2016 AFL Grand Final was an Australian rules football game contested between Sydney and the Western Bulldogs at the Melbourne Cricket Ground on 1 October 2016. It was the 121st annual Grand Final of the Australian Football League (formerly the Victorian Football League), staged to determine the premiers of the 2016 AFL season. The match, attended by 99,981 spectators, was won by the Bulldogs by a margin of 22 points, marking the club's second VFL/AFL premiership victory and first since 1954. It was the first time in VFL/AFL history that a team won the premiership from seventh place on the ladder. Jason Johannisen of the Bulldogs was awarded the Norm Smith Medal as the best player on the ground.

== Background ==
Minor premiers for the ninth time, the Sydney Swans finished the home-and-away season with a 17-5 record. They were defeated by the GWS Giants in the qualifying final by 36 points, but bounced back with a semi-final victory against Adelaide, and then a 37-point preliminary final win against Geelong at the Melbourne Cricket Ground for their third grand final appearance in five years.

Injuries ended the 2016 season for key Western Bulldogs players: captain Bob Murphy (round 3) and Jack Redpath (round 18) ruptured their anterior cruciate ligaments, and midfielder Mitch Wallis (round 18) fractured his left tibia and fibula. Jason Johannisen and Matt Suckling also sat out for extended periods. The Bulldogs nevertheless won 15 games to finish 7th on the home-and-away ladder and qualify for the finals for the second consecutive year. Against the odds, they eliminated both 2015's grand finalists, West Coast and Hawthorn, in the elimination and semi-finals respectively. The Bulldogs then beat the Giants at Spotless Stadium by six points in the preliminary final to qualify for their first grand final appearance since 1961. In doing so, the Bulldogs became the first team since Carlton in 1999 to reach a grand final after finishing the home-and-away season outside of the top four and the first team to do so under the current finals format that was introduced in 2000.

Sydney and the Western Bulldogs met in round 15 at the Sydney Cricket Ground. Returning from injury and with just four seconds remaining, Bulldogs defender Johannisen kicked a goal to defeat the Swans 11.13 (79) to 13.5 (83).

The AFL had introduced a pre-finals bye in 2016 to discourage teams from resting players en masse in the final round of the home-and-away season.

== Entertainment ==
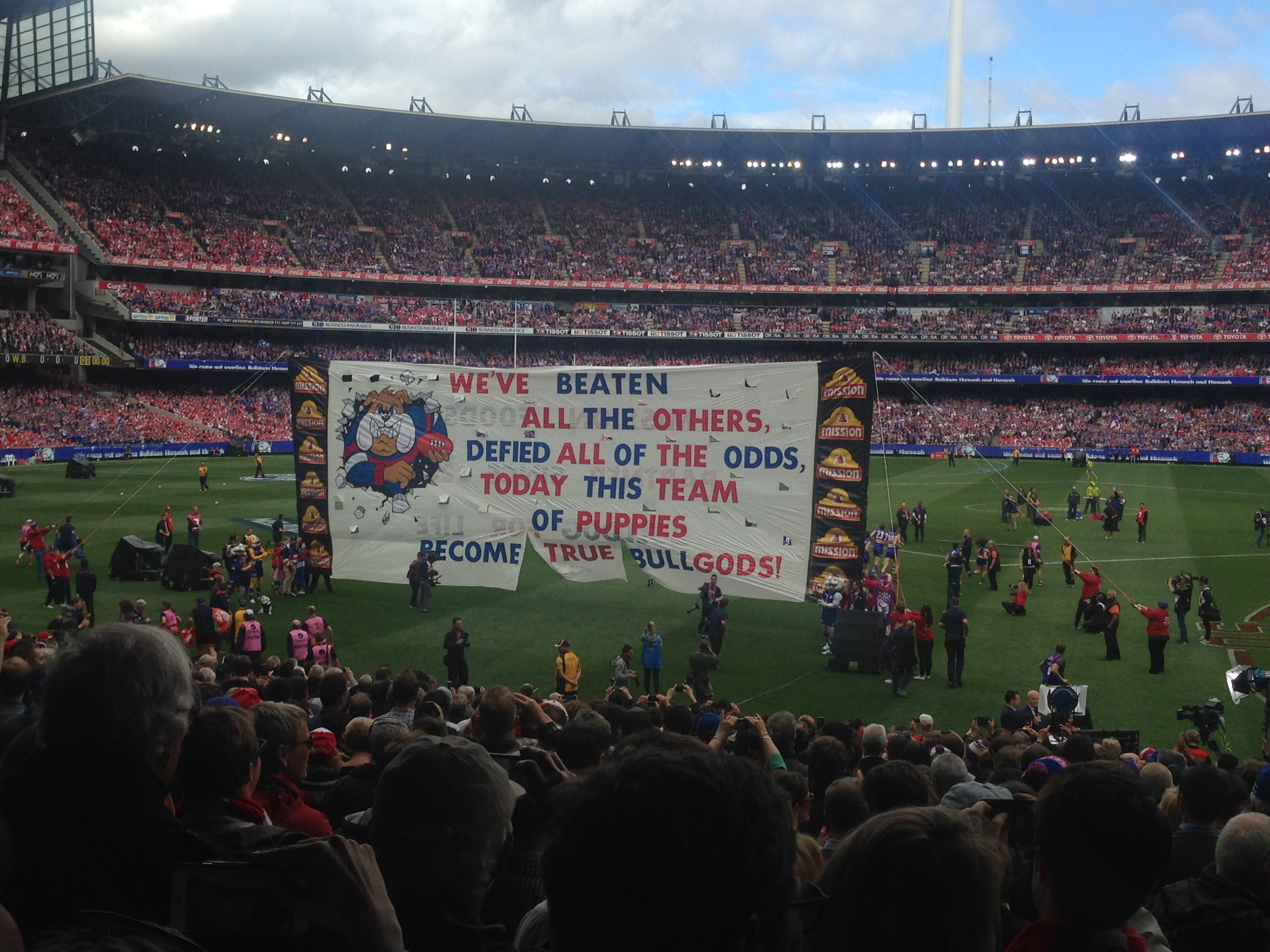
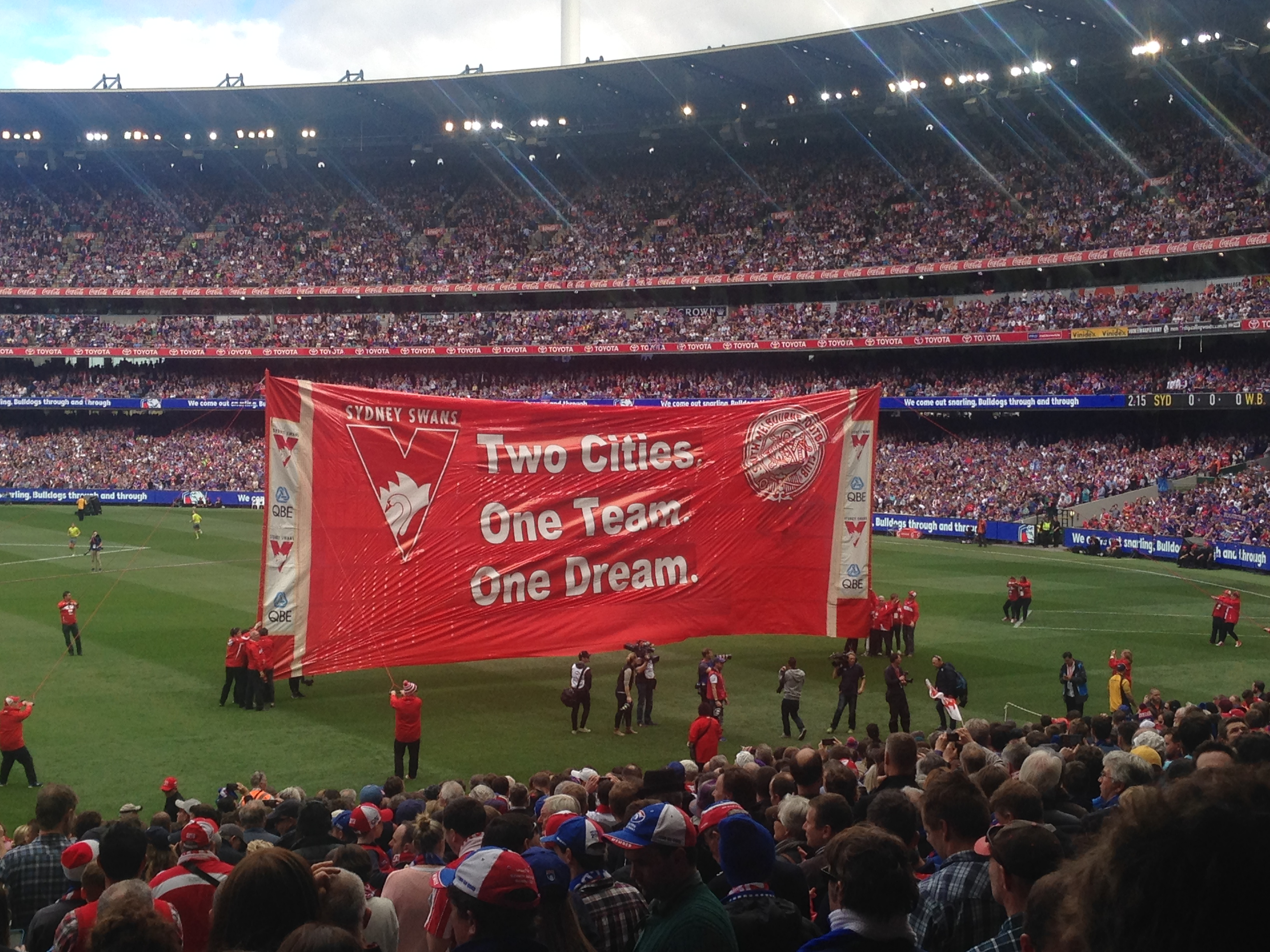
The banners for the Western Bulldogs (left) and Sydney Swans (right)

Similar to previous grand finals, the 2016 AFL Grand Final provided both pre-match and post-match entertainment. Artists to perform were Melburnian musicians Vance Joy and band the Living End, and British rocker Sting. Sister duo Vika and Linda Bull performed the national anthem, and Mike Brady performed a new version of his famous football song "One Day in September".

== Match summary ==
=== First quarter ===
Easton Wood won the coin toss for the Bulldogs and chose to kick towards the city end. The Swans had an early injury scare when Lance Franklin was taken off the field with a suspected foot injury after four minutes; he returned later in the quarter and played out the full game, but needed medical attention at quarter time. The Swans were the first to score (a behind) in the 10th minute with Kieren Jack taking a courageous mark before colliding into the incoming Wood. The first goal came in the thirteenth minute to the Swans as Luke Parker scored from a distance of 35 m (38 yd). The Bulldogs' first score came in the 20th minute, when Zaine Cordy scored a goal from the boundary line; three minutes later, the Bulldogs scored again via a mark from Tory Dickson, to take a four point lead. There were no other scores in the low-scoring first quarter, and the Bulldogs led 2.0 (12) to 1.2 (8) at quarter time.

=== Second quarter ===
In a much more high scoring second quarter, goals came at regular intervals. Tom Boyd opened the scoring for the Bulldogs after three minutes. Nick Smith kicked Sydney's second goal in the 6th minute, before two goals to the Bulldogs from Dickson (10th minute) and Liam Picken (12th minute) extended the Bulldogs' lead to 16 points. Sydney then put on a run of four consecutive goals in eight minutes to take an 8 point lead: Tom Mitchell (13th minute); Gary Rohan (16th minute); and two to Josh Kennedy (18th and 20th minutes), whose work in the midfield was also largely responsible for the Swans revival, with 22 first half disposals. The Bulldogs fought back in time-on, Tom Boyd kicking his second goal for the Bulldogs in the 27th minute, Tom Mitchell kicking his second for Sydney in the 29th minute, and Toby McLean kicking his first for the Bulldogs in the 32nd minute. At half time, Sydney led by two points, 7.3 (45) to 7.1 (43).

=== Third quarter ===
Dickson kicked his third goal to take the lead for the Bulldogs after four minutes. Thereafter began an arm-wrestle of a quarter, in which only two more goals were kicked: in the 17th minute, Toby McLean conceded a fifty metre penalty against Kennedy for a late bump in a marking contest, and Kennedy converted the kick into his third goal, giving Sydney a 1-point lead; three minutes later, Clay Smith kicked a goal for the Bulldogs. For the remainder of the quarter, the Bulldogs attacked relentlessly, managing four behinds but no further goals. At three quarter time, the Bulldogs 9.7 (61) led Sydney 8.5 (53) by eight points.

After accurate goalkicking had dominated the first half, the third quarter saw several missed shots on goal for both teams, but particularly for the Bulldogs – who dominated general play but managed only 2.6 (18) for the quarter to Sydney's 1.2 (8). Bulldogs' forward Jake Stringer was particularly off target, with one behind and three shots out of bounds on the full to this point in the game.

=== Final quarter ===
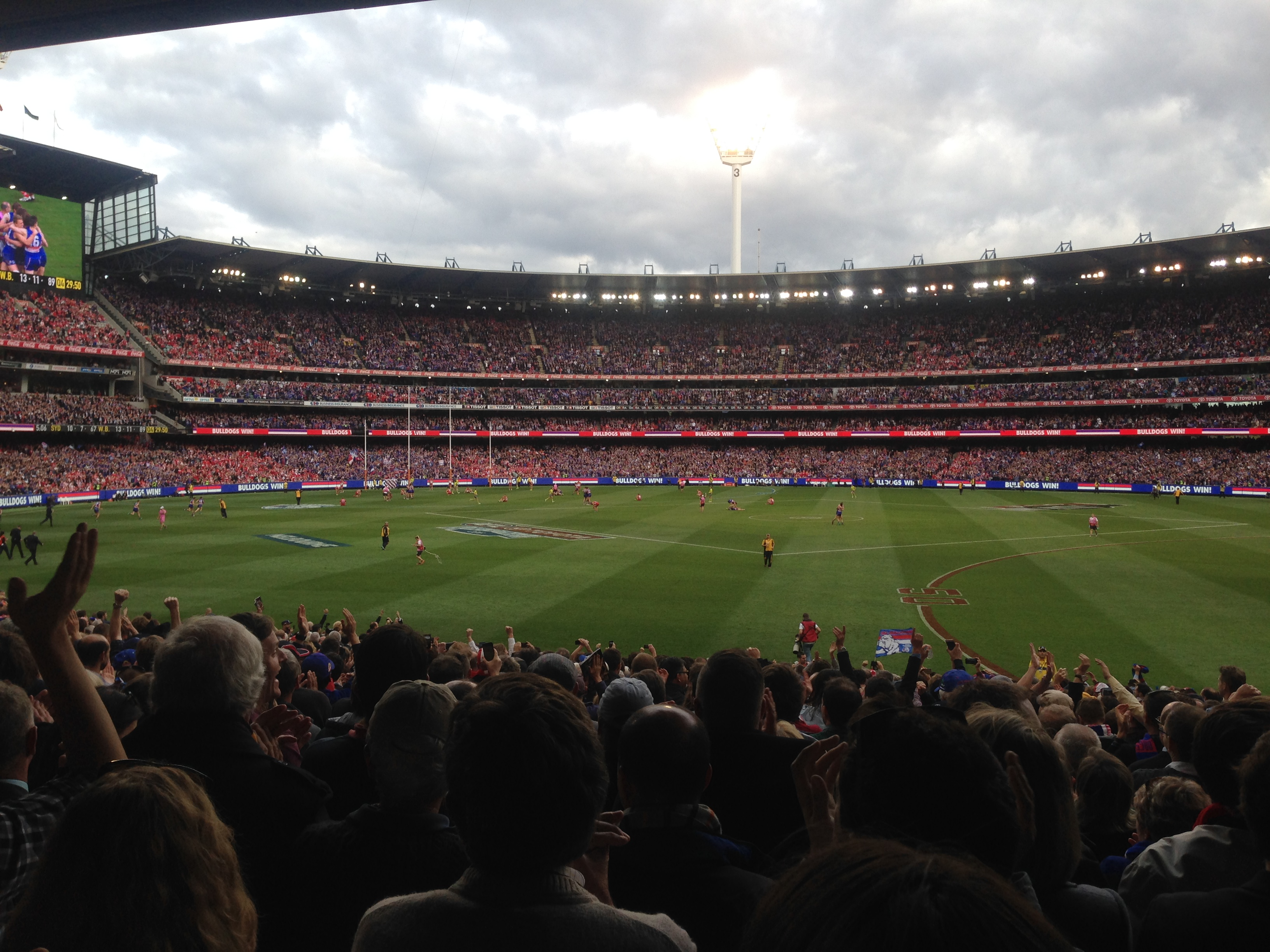
The reaction of the players and supporters moments after the final siren

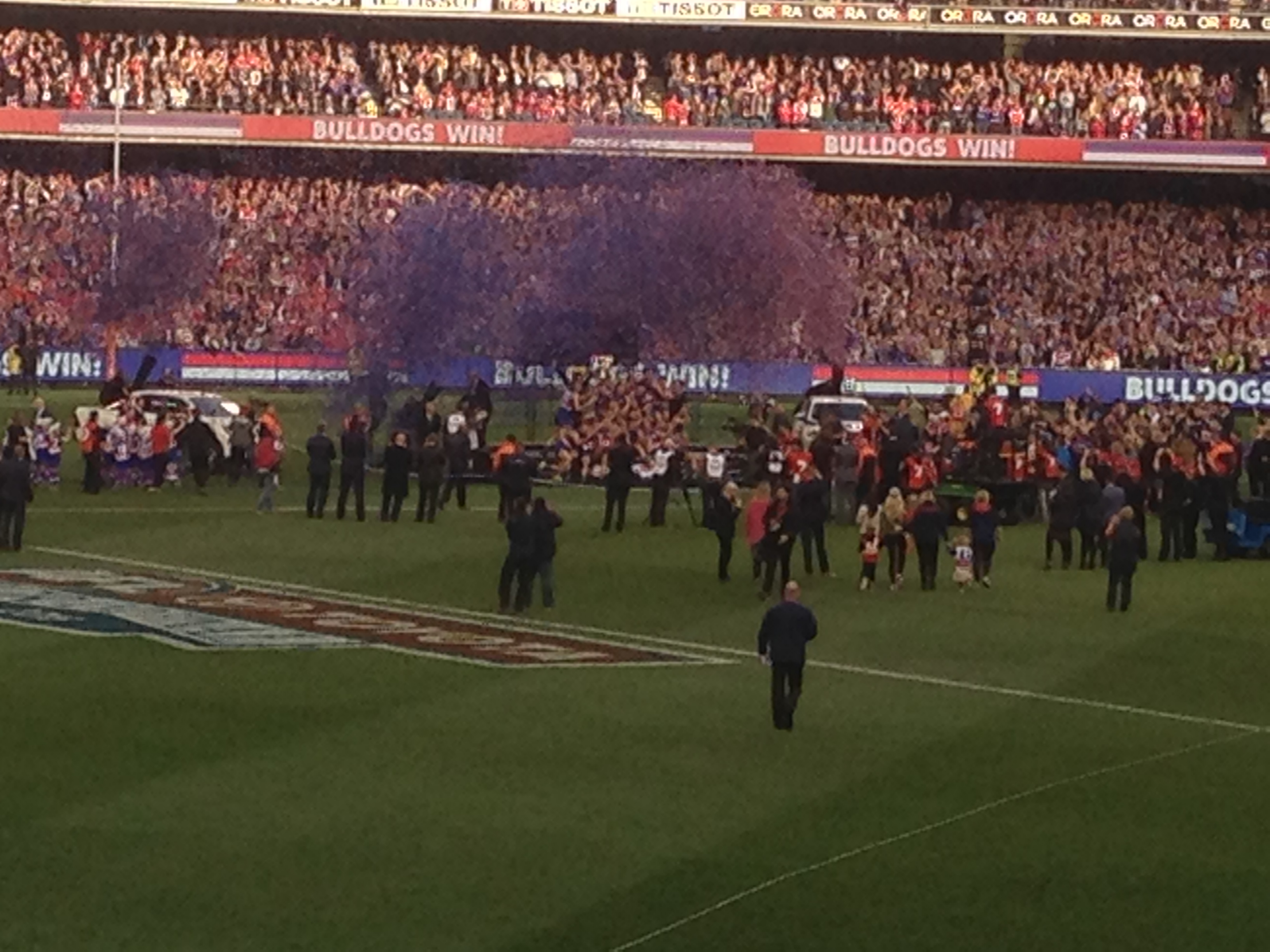
The Bulldogs team on the podium with the premiership cup

Early in the final quarter, Swans midfielder Dan Hannebery suffered an injury to his left knee when he collided awkwardly with Easton Wood who had gone in low to claim the ball on the ground. He was promptly helped off the field for treatment and attempted to continue playing after having his knee strapped, only to return to the bench after taking a free kick with the injured leg.

Despite this, Sydney attacked early, and when Lance Franklin kicked his first goal – the first and only goal kicked by one of the Swans' recognised forwards in the match – the Bulldogs' lead was narrowed to one point. Jake Stringer extended the margin to 7 points with his only goal in the 11th minute, and George Hewett scored another for the Swans to draw the margin back to 1 point in the 13th minute, the score at that stage reading Bulldogs 10.7 (67) leading Sydney 10.6 (66).

With only seven minutes of playing time remaining, Liam Picken kicked his second goal from a broken play in the Bulldogs forward line in the 18th minute to extend the margin to 7 points. The Bulldogs attacked again from the next centre bounce, and a minute later, Jason Johannisen pounced on an errant Sydney rebound and kicked a score from 50m which was initially called a goal, but changed to a behind on video review after being touched on the goal line by Jeremy Laidler (Sydney). The ensuing kick-in was turned over, resulting in another touched behind to the Bulldogs. Then, in the 22nd minute, Dale Morris (Bulldogs) tackled Lance Franklin in the centre square, and Tom Boyd gathered the loose ball to kick his third goal and put the Bulldogs 15 points ahead with five minutes to play.

Sydney won the ensuing centre clearance, ending with Ben McGlynn mark and set shot from 40m which missed narrowly to the left. It was Sydney's last score and last time inside its attacking 50m arc, as the Bulldogs rebounded, and finished with three more scores: a behind to Boyd, Liam Picken's third goal in the 27th minute, and a behind on the final siren to Toby McLean. The Bulldogs kicked 3.4 (22) against Sydney's 0.1 (1) in the final seven minutes of playing time, and won the game 13.11 (89) d. 10.7 (67).

=== Norm Smith Medal ===
Norm Smith Medal voting tally
| Position | Player | Club | Total votes | Voting summary |
|---|---|---|---|---|
| 1st (winner) | Jason Johannisen | Western Bulldogs | 10 | 3,3,2,2 |
| 2nd | Josh Kennedy | Sydney Swans | 8 | 3,2,1,1,1 |
| 3rd | Tom Boyd | Western Bulldogs | 7 | 3,3,1 |
| 4th | Liam Picken | Western Bulldogs | 5 | 2,2,1 |

Jason Johannisen was named the Norm Smith Medallist (best on ground) with ten votes, having spend much of the game playing a rebounding role across the middle of the ground, accumulating 33 possessions and launching nine inside 50s. Johannisen won the award ahead of Sydney midfielder Josh Kennedy with eight votes (34 disposals and 3 goals), Tom Boyd with seven votes (6 contested marks and 3 goals) and Liam Picken with five votes (25 disposals, 3 goals).

Chaired by Michael Voss, the voters and their choices were as follows:

| Voter | Role | 3 votes | 2 votes | 1 vote |
|---|---|---|---|---|
| Michael Voss | Former AFL Player | Jason Johannisen | Liam Picken | Josh Kennedy |
| Wayne Carey | Channel 7 | Tom Boyd | Liam Picken | Josh Kennedy |
| Jay Clark | Herald Sun | Josh Kennedy | Jason Johannisen | Liam Picken |
| Brad Johnson | Fox Footy | Jason Johannisen | Josh Kennedy | Tom Boyd |
| Emma Quayle | The Age | Tom Boyd | Jason Johannisen | Josh Kennedy |

=== Presentation ===
During the official on-field presentation, Bulldogs coach Luke Beveridge invited injured Bulldogs' captain Bob Murphy – a popular Bulldogs' stalwart who had played with the club continuously since 2000, but who had missed all but the first three games of the premiership season with a torn anterior cruciate ligament – onto the podium. Beveridge then gave his own Jock McHale medal to Murphy, and urged Murphy to hoist the premiership trophy alongside acting captain Easton Wood instead of following the tradition of the captain and coach hoisting the cup. Murphy chose to return the medal to Beveridge the following day, and Beveridge then donated the medal to the Western Bulldogs club museum.

==== Best players ====
Among the star players were Tom Boyd (six contested marks, three goals and two points), Picken (25 possessions and three goals) and Jack Macrae (32 possessions). Kennedy was the stand out player for the Swans taking a total of 34 possessions and three goals. Statistically, Dane Rampe was effective in defence (24 possessions and nine rebound 50s), as were Jack (22 possessions) and Mitchell (26 possessions and two goals) in midfield.

== Teams ==
The teams were announced on 29 September 2016. Sydney made two changes to its lineup from the preliminary final, with co-captain Jarrad McVeigh and Rising Star winner Callum Mills both returning from injury. They replaced Aliir Aliir, who suffered a knee injury in the preliminary final, and Harrison Marsh, who was omitted. The Bulldogs remained unchanged from its preliminary final.

Stewart Crameri missed the opportunity to be part of the Western Bulldogs' premiership win as he had been suspended for twelve months in January 2016 for being part of the controversial supplements and sports science program that took place at his former club, Essendon, during the 2012 AFL season. He had been permitted to return to club training only in the week leading to the grand final. Among the 34 players suspended as a result of the program, Crameri received one of the highest settlement payouts from the club as a direct consequence of having missed the premiership opportunity.

| Sydney | W. Bulldogs |

Sydney
| B: | 44 Jake Lloyd | 39 Heath Grundy | 40 Nick Smith |
| HB: | 14 Callum Mills | 11 Jeremy Laidler | 24 Dane Rampe |
| C: | 15 Kieren Jack (c) | 12 Josh Kennedy | 3 Jarrad McVeigh (c) |
| HF: | 6 Tom Mitchell | 23 Lance Franklin | 26 Luke Parker |
| F: | 41 Tom Papley | 8 Kurt Tippett | 21 Ben McGlynn |
| Foll: | 35 Sam Naismith | 4 Dan Hannebery | 5 Isaac Heeney |
| Int: | 16 Gary Rohan | 10 Zak Jones | 29 George Hewett |
| Int: | 42 Xavier Richards | | |
| Coach: | John Longmire | | |

Western Bulldogs
| B: | 39 Jason Johannisen | 30 Joel Hamling | 5 Matthew Boyd |
| HB: | 24 Shane Biggs | 38 Dale Morris | 10 Easton Wood (c) |
| C: | 7 Lachie Hunter | 4 Marcus Bontempelli | 42 Liam Picken |
| HF: | 11 Jack Macrae | 12 Zaine Cordy | 9 Jake Stringer |
| F: | 29 Tory Dickson | 17 Tom Boyd | 14 Clay Smith |
| Foll: | 23 Jordan Roughead | 6 Luke Dahlhaus | 21 Tom Liberatore |
| Int: | 16 Toby McLean | 18 Fletcher Roberts | 20 Josh Dunkley |
| Int: | 35 Caleb Daniel | | |
| Coach: | Luke Beveridge | | |

Umpires

The umpiring panel, comprising three field umpires, four boundary umpires, two goal umpires and an emergency in each position is given below. The most notable appointment was field umpire Scott Jeffery's selection for his sole grand final. An AFL review of the umpiring post game found it was not up to the standard expected, with three or four decisions incorrectly going against Sydney among an overall free kick count of 20–8 favouring the Bulldogs. The differential of 12 was the biggest in a grand final since the three-umpire system was introduced.

2016 AFL Grand Final umpires
| Position | | | | | Emergency |
|---|---|---|---|---|---|
| Field: | 9 Matt Stevic (4) | 21 Simon Meredith (4) | 29 Scott Jeffery (1) | | Justin Schmitt |
| Boundary: | Ian Burrows (7) | Chris Bull (1) | Rob Haala (3) | Michael Marantelli (2) | Matthew Konetschka |
| Goal: | Chris Appleton (3) | Adam Wojcik (3) | | | Chelsea Roffey |

Numbers in brackets represent the number of grand finals umpired, including 2016.

== Scoreboard ==
Grand Final
Saturday, 1 October (2:30 pm) | Sydney | def. by | Western Bulldogs | MCG (crowd: 99,981) | Report
1.2 (8); 7.3 (45); 8.5 (53); 10.7 (67) | Q1; Q2; Q3; Final | 2.0 (12); 7.1 (43); 9.7 (61); 13.11 (89) | Umpires: Matt Stevic, Simon Meredith, Scott Jeffery; Norm Smith Medal: Jason Johannisen; Television broadcast: Seven Network; National anthem: Vika and Linda Bull
Kennedy 3 Mitchell 2 Parker, N. Smith, Rohan, Franklin, Hewett 1 | Goals | 3 T. Boyd, Dickson, Picken; 1 Cordy, McLean, C. Smith, Stringer
Kennedy, Mitchell, Rampe, Heeney, Jones, Hannebery | Best | Johannisen, Picken, T. Boyd, Macrae, M. Boyd, Dahlhaus
Franklin (right ankle), Hannebery (left knee) | Injuries | Johannisen (calf)
Nil | Reports | Nil
Western Bulldogs won their first premiership in sixty-two years, breaking the longest active drought in VFL/AFL history.; The Western Bulldogs became the first team in VFL/AFL history to win the premiership from seventh place on the ladder.

== Media coverage ==
The match was televised by the Seven Network. The match commentary was conducted by Bruce McAvaney and Dennis Cometti for the Seven Network, marking it the duo's eighth grand final appearance together as commentators since 2008 and their twelfth overall. It was Cometti's eighteenth grand final and McAvaney's sixteenth. This was the final match of commentary by Cometti after he announced that 2016 would be the end of his 30-year commentary career.

The sports film Year of the Dogs, which covered the Western Bulldogs' turbulent 1996 season in which they finished second-last, was aired on 7mate the day prior to the Grand Final.

All four radio partners, 1116 SEN, 3AW, ABC Grandstand, and Triple M broadcast the match live, with Triple M simulcasting nationally to their local channels and to 92.5 Gold FM in the Gold Coast and Mix 94.5 in Perth.

6.5 million in-home viewers watched some part of Seven's telecast across the day. A peak audience at 5.2 million viewers tuned-in at one stage, with an average of 4.089 million across the metro cities and regional homes during the game. It was the most-watched football match since the network attained free-to-air grand final screening rights a decade earlier, and the fifth most-watched match in VFL/AFL history.

=== International coverage ===
| Region | Rights holder(s) |
|---|---|
| Asia | Australia Plus, Eurosport |
| Canada | TSN2 |
| Caribbean | ESPN |
| China | CCTV5 |
| Europe | Eurosport |
| India | Australia Plus |
| Ireland | BT Sport, Eurosport |
| Latin America | Claro Sports |
| Middle East | Orbit Showtime Network |
| New Zealand | Sky Sports, TVNZ |
| United Kingdom | BT Sport, Eurosport |
| United States | Fox Soccer Plus |

== See also ==
- 2016 AFL season
- 2016 AFL finals series
