= Gary Rohan =

Australian rules footballer (born 1991)

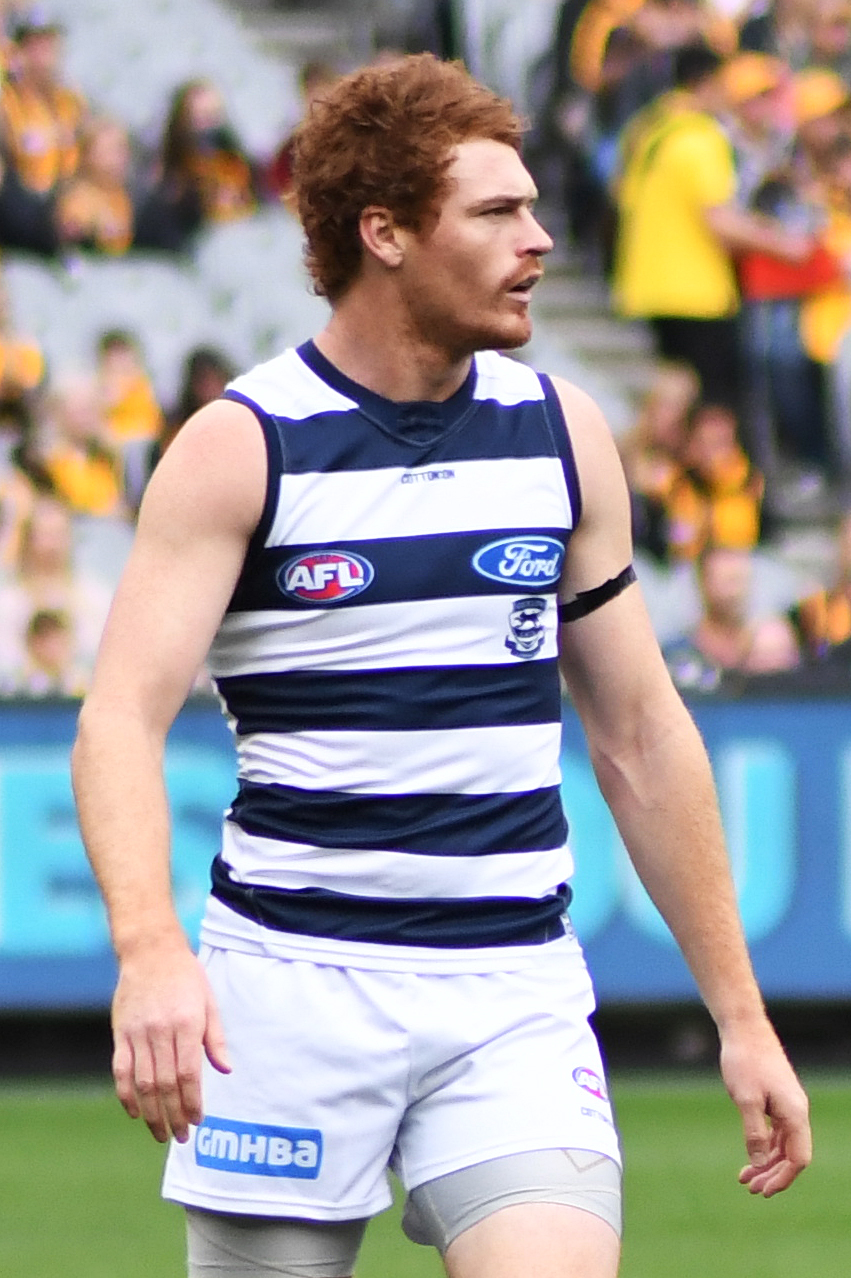
- Rohan playing for Geelong in April 2019

Personal information
- Full name: Gary Rohan
- Nicknames: Gary, Chucky
- Born: 7 June 1991 (age 35)
- Original team: Geelong Falcons (TAC Cup)
- Draft: No. 6, 2009 national draft
- Height: 189 cm (6 ft 2 in)
- Weight: 92 kg (203 lb)
- Position: Forward / defender

Playing career
Years	Club	Games (Goals)
2010–2018	Sydney	106 (96)
2019–2024	Geelong	98 (120)
Total		204 (216)

Career highlights
- AFL Premiership Player: (2022)

Gary Rohan (born 7 June 1991) is a former Australian rules footballer who played for the Sydney Swans and Geelong Cats in the Australian Football League (AFL).

== Junior career ==
Rohan participated in the Auskick program at Cobden. At 14 he could not get a game in the Cobden under-aged side so he gave up football in preference to mixed netball. The desire to play football again he tried out with the Geelong Falcons, struggling at first but his top-aged year saw great improvement. Rohan represented Victoria Country at the 2009 AFL National Under 18 Championships, winning the team's MVP award as well as All-Australian honours.

Geelong Falcons regional manager Michael Turner described Rohan as "the most exciting player I've ever seen".

Sydney coach Paul Roos admitted, "We were looking for players with pace, and Gary is very, very quick!" His friend Ben Cunnington was drafted by North Melbourne with the previous pick.

== AFL career ==
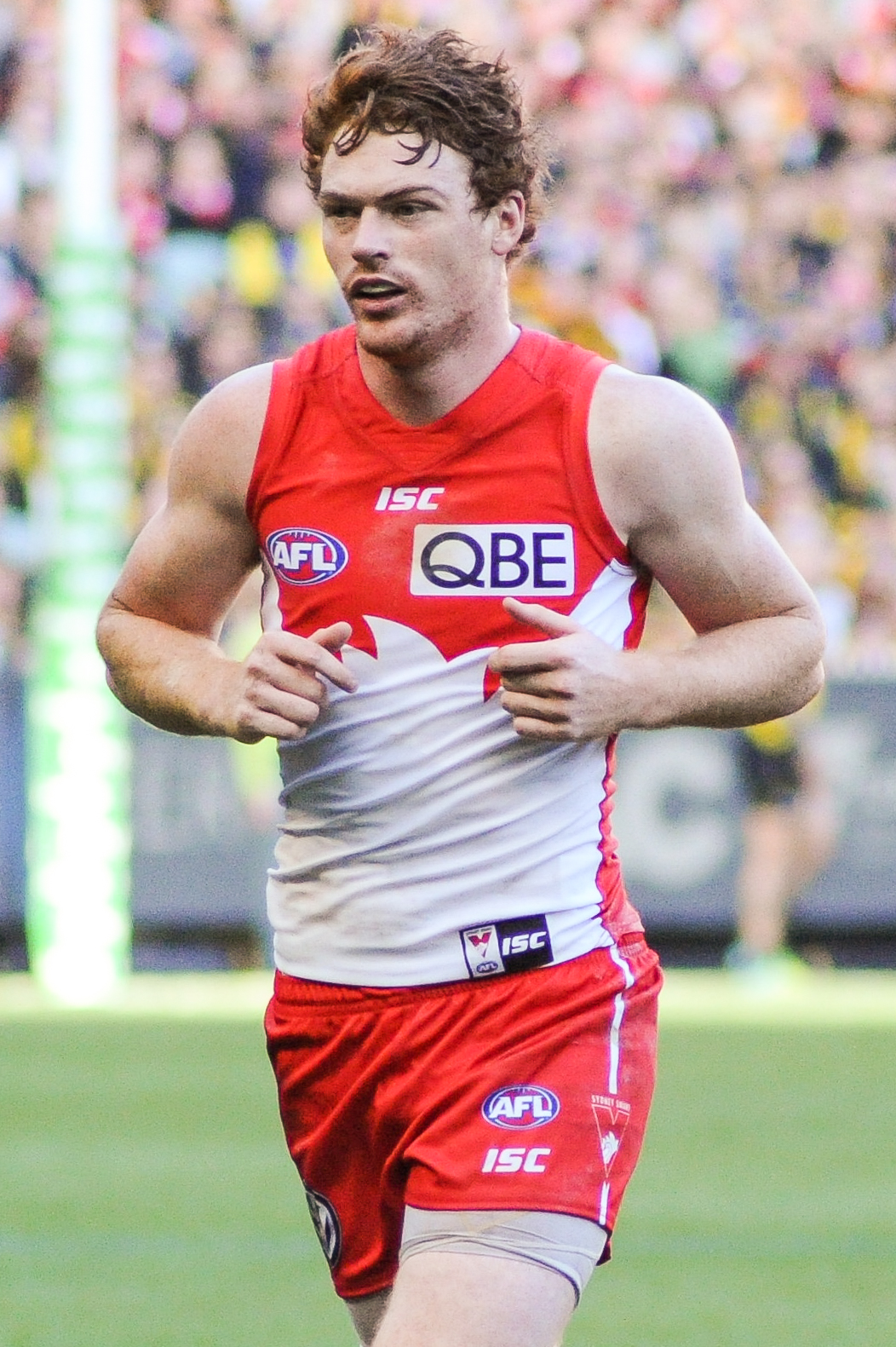
Rohan playing for Sydney in June 2017

Rohan was drafted to Sydney with the sixth selection (just the Swans' second top-10 draft pick since the late 1990s) in the 2009 AFL draft from the Geelong Falcons. Rohan made his AFL debut in round 7 of the 2010 season, against reigning premiers, Geelong, at Kardinia Park, where he had played much of his junior football with the Falcons. Rohan finished his debut season having played nine senior games for the Swans and kicking seven goals.

Much of Rohan's 2011 season was written off due to a serious hamstring injury but, when he returned to the senior side late in the year, he managed to have a profound impact on the side's performance. He was played as a near-permanent forward and performed well as he kicked goals and chased and tackled hard.

In Round 4 of the 2012 AFL season, Rohan suffered a horrific leg injury in the opening minutes of Sydney's 36-point win over North Melbourne. This injury ruled him out for the 2012 season.

Rohan played for the Swans in the 2014 AFL Grand Final and 2016 AFL Grand Final.

In 2017, Rohan missed the first four matches due to ongoing injury concerns. In just his second game for the year, against the Carlton Blues, he had a nasty fall and concussion and was out for two weeks. But his career took a good turn from there. Against the Richmond Football Club, he sealed the game with a right foot snap. But his biggest moment was in Round 14 against Essendon. With 24 seconds left, the Swans were five points down, and Rohan found himself in a one-on-one in the goalsquare. When his teammate Dane Rampe picked up the ball and banana-kicked it down his throat, Rohan stuck out his left hand and took the mark. He put it through after the siren to complete a 19-point comeback with 4 1/2 minutes to play. Against the Gold Coast Suns in Round 16, he had his best individual game, with 5 goals and 16 touches.

Following the 2018 season, Rohan was traded to Geelong. He played in his third grand final in 2020.

In Round 14 of the 2021 AFL season, Rohan kicked the winning goal after the siren to defeat the Western Bulldogs, thus becoming only the second player after Barry Hall to do so for two different AFL clubs.

In 2022, Rohan played in his fourth grand final and won his first premiership.

Rohan was delisted by Geelong at the end of the 2024 AFL season.

=== Coaching ===
Ahead of the 2023 AFL Women's season, Rohan joined the Geelong AFL Women's program as a development coach under Daniel Lowther.

== Personal life ==
Gary is married to Madi Rohan. They have two sons together.

He has two daughters with his ex-wife: twins born in 2018, one of whom died five hours after birth from anencephaly, and another daughter born in 2020.

== Statistics ==
Legend
G	Goals	K	Kicks	D	Disposals	T	Tackles
B	Behinds	H	Handballs	M	Marks
#	Played in that season's premiership team

Season	Team	No.	Games	Totals							Averages (per game)							Votes
Season	Team	No.	Games	G	B	K	H	D	M	T	G	B	K	H	D	M	T	Votes
2010	Sydney	16	9	7	1	64	33	97	28	23	0.8	0.1	7.1	3.7	10.8	3.1	2.6	0
2011	Sydney	16	9	8	3	56	25	81	19	19	0.9	0.3	6.2	2.8	9.0	2.1	2.1	0
2012	Sydney	16	4	3	2	15	24	39	8	15	0.8	0.5	3.8	6.0	9.8	2.0	3.8	0
2013	Sydney	16	5	5	1	18	7	25	12	11	1.0	0.2	3.6	1.4	5.0	2.4	2.2	0
2014	Sydney	16	16	6	9	103	69	172	42	37	0.4	0.6	6.4	4.3	10.8	2.6	2.3	0
2015	Sydney	16	18	13	10	125	75	200	77	38	0.7	0.6	6.9	4.2	11.1	4.3	2.1	0
2016	Sydney	16	18	25	16	140	47	187	68	52	1.4	0.9	7.8	2.6	10.4	3.8	2.9	0
2017	Sydney	16	16	22	10	116	37	153	64	52	1.4	0.6	7.3	2.3	9.6	4.0	3.3	3
2018	Sydney	16	11	7	4	71	22	93	27	30	0.6	0.4	6.5	2.0	8.5	2.5	2.7	0
2019	Geelong	23	19	25	11	125	37	162	65	34	1.3	0.6	6.6	1.9	8.5	3.4	1.8	1
2020 (Note: The 2020 season was played with 17 home-and-away matches per team (down from 22) and 16-minute quarters with time on (down from 20-minute quarters with time on) due to the impact of the COVID-19 pandemic.)	Geelong	23	19	22	17	123	41	164	61	36	1.2	0.9	6.5	2.2	8.6	3.2	1.9	3
2021	Geelong	23	21	32	18	147	67	214	75	41	1.5	0.9	7.0	3.2	10.2	3.6	2.0	1
2022^{#}	Geelong	23	12	14	6	71	37	108	31	29	1.2	0.5	5.9	3.1	9.0	2.6	2.4	0
2023	Geelong	23	15	18	9	89	45	134	45	35	1.2	0.6	5.9	3.0	8.9	3.0	2.3	1
2024	Geelong	23	12	9	1	65	23	88	34	14	0.8	0.1	5.4	1.9	7.3	2.8	1.2	0
2025	Geelong	23	0	—	—	—	—	—	—	—	—	—	—	—	—	—	—	0
Career			204	216	118	1328	589	1917	656	466	1.1	0.6	6.5	2.9	9.4	3.2	2.3	9

== Honours and achievements ==
Team

- AFL premiership player (Geelong): 2022
- 2× McClelland Trophy (Geelong): 2019, 2022
- 2× McClelland Trophy (Sydney): 2014, 2016
