= Jordan Roughead =

Australian rules footballer (born 1990)

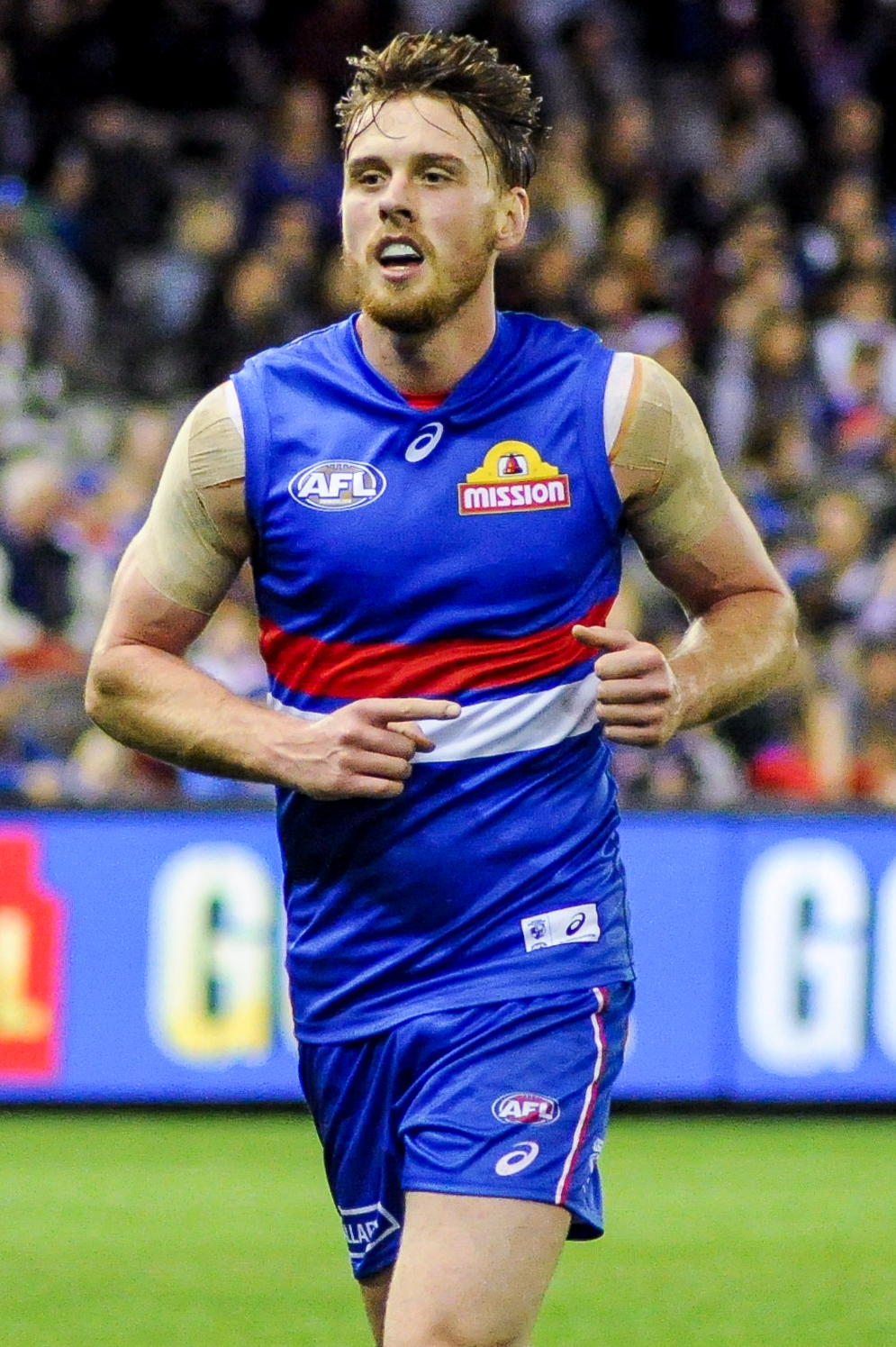
- Roughead in June 2017

Personal information
- Full name: Jordan Roughead
- Born: 3 November 1990 (age 36)
- Original team: North Ballarat Rebels (TAC Cup)
- Draft: No. 31, 2008 national draft
- Height: 200 cm (6 ft 7 in)
- Weight: 100 kg (220 lb)
- Position: Key defender / ruckman

Playing career^{1}
Years	Club	Games (Goals)
2010–2018	Western Bulldogs	138 (34)
2019–2022	Collingwood	63 (1)
Total		201 (35)
- ^{1} Playing statistics correct to the end of the 2022 season.

Career highlights
- AFL premiership player (2016); Tony Liberatore Most Improved Player (2016)

Jordan Roughead (born 3 November 1990) is a former Australian rules footballer who played for the Collingwood Football Club and the Western Bulldogs in the Australian Football League (AFL). Roughead is the 2024 backline coach of the Collingwood Football Club. He is the cousin of former Hawthorn player Jarryd Roughead.

== AFL career ==
=== Western Bulldogs (2010–2018) ===
Selected with the 31st selection in the 2008 AFL draft, after playing for the North Ballarat Rebels in the TAC Cup, Roughead played as a ruckman but was capable of filling a key position up forward and in defence.

In round 5 of 2010, Roughead made his AFL debut against Adelaide at Etihad Stadium. He performed well, gathering 9 disposals (3 kicks and 6 handballs), taking 4 marks, making 3 tackles and kicking a goal.

During the 2012 season, Bulldogs coach Brendan McCartney moved Roughead into defence. He remained in this position until mid-2015 when McCartney's successor as coach, Luke Beveridge, moved him back into the ruck.

Roughead was announced as the vice captain for 2015. However, he relinquished the position at the end of the season, choosing instead to focus on his sole performance as footballer.

In 2016, Roughead played in the Bulldogs' drought-breaking 22-point Grand Final win against the Sydney Swans, amassing 13 disposals and 17 hit-outs from 75% game time.

=== Collingwood (2019–2022) ===
At the end of the 2018 season, Roughead was traded to Collingwood in the last 30 minutes of the AFL trade period.

On 27 May 2022, Roughead announced his retirement after 201 games. He had only played 1 game in the first 10 rounds due to a finger injury.

== Statistics ==
Statistics are correct to the end of the 2022 season

Legend
G	Goals	K	Kicks	D	Disposals	T	Tackles
B	Behinds	H	Handballs	M	Marks
#	Played in that season's premiership team

Season	Team	No.	Games	Totals								Averages (per game)							
Season	Team	No.	Games	G	B	K	H	D	M	T	H/O	G	B	K	H	D	M	T	H/O
2010	Western Bulldogs	23	8	3	7	37	53	90	32	19	74	0.4	0.9	4.6	6.6	11.3	4.0	2.4	9.3
2011	Western Bulldogs	23	9	3	5	43	58	101	28	28	76	0.3	0.6	4.8	6.4	11.2	3.1	3.1	8.4
2012	Western Bulldogs	23	18	4	8	98	97	195	76	48	105	0.2	0.4	5.4	5.4	10.8	4.2	2.7	5.8
2013	Western Bulldogs	23	22	2	1	117	117	234	105	65	12	0.1	0.0	5.3	5.3	10.6	4.8	3.0	0.5
2014	Western Bulldogs	23	15	0	1	92	79	171	66	32	7	0.0	0.1	6.1	5.3	11.4	4.4	2.1	0.5
2015	Western Bulldogs	23	16	4	2	82	78	160	66	54	170	0.3	0.1	5.1	4.9	10.0	4.1	3.4	10.6
2016^{#}	Western Bulldogs	23	25	8	10	148	126	274	86	87	382	0.3	0.4	5.9	5.0	11.0	3.4	3.5	15.3
2017	Western Bulldogs	23	13	4	2	77	75	152	30	47	246	0.3	0.2	5.9	5.8	11.7	2.3	3.6	18.9
2018	Western Bulldogs	23	12	6	6	78	63	141	50	35	146	0.5	0.5	6.5	5.3	11.8	4.2	2.9	12.2
2019	Collingwood	23	24	1	0	167	116	283	124	43	17	0.0	0.0	7.0	4.8	11.8	5.2	1.8	0.7
2020 (Note: The 2020 season was played with 17 home-and-away matches per team (down from 22) and 16-minute quarters with time on (down from 20-minute quarters with time on) due to the impact of the COVID-19 pandemic.)	Collingwood	23	17	0	0	90	67	157	64	18	0	0.0	0.0	5.3	3.9	9.2	3.8	1.1	0.0
2021	Collingwood	23	21	0	0	190	87	277	137	35	9	0.0	0.0	9.0	4.1	13.2	6.5	1.7	0.4
2022	Collingwood	23	1	0	0	4	2	6	3	0	0	0.0	0.0	4.0	2.0	6.0	3.0	0.0	0.0
Career			201	35	42	1223	1018	2241	867	511	1244	0.2	0.2	6.1	5.1	11.1	4.3	2.5	6.2

== Honours and achievements ==
AFL

- 1× AFL Premiership Player: 2016

Collingwood Football Club

- Darren Millane Memorial Trophy (Best Clubman): 2021

Western Bulldogs

- 1× Tony Liberatore Award (Most Improved Player): 2016
- Chris Grant Award (Best First Year Player): 2010

Roughead was twice-nominated for the Jim Stynes Community Leadership Award, at the Western Bulldogs in 2017 and Collingwood in 2021. His community work was largely across four key focus areas including the LGBTIQA+ community, climate action, youth homelessness and women’s sports.

== Personal life ==
Roughead grew up a Bulldogs supporter. His cousin is four-time premiership player and former Hawthorn captain Jarryd Roughead. He has completed a Masters of Business (Sports Management) and is currently studying a Master of Business Administration at Deakin University.

He is a co-owner of Hawthorn cafe Whiplash, alongside past and present Collingwood FC players, Brody Mihocek, Nathan Murphy and Callum Brown.
