= Jack Redpath =

Australian rules footballer

Personal information
- Full name: Jack Redpath
- Born: 13 December 1990 (age 35)
- Original team: Kyneton (Bendigo FL)
- Draft: No. 62, 2012 Rookie Draft, Western Bulldogs
- Height: 194 cm (6 ft 4 in)
- Weight: 104 kg (229 lb)
- Position: Full Forward

Playing career^{1}
Years	Club	Games (Goals)
2012–2018	Western Bulldogs	36 (57)
- ^{1} Playing statistics correct to the end of 2018.

Career highlights
- VFL premiership player: 2014

Jack Redpath (born 13 December 1990) is a former Australian rules footballer who played for the Western Bulldogs in the Australian Football League (AFL). Redpath plays most of his football as a full forward, who was selected with the 62nd selection in the 2012 Rookie Draft, after playing for the Kyneton Football Club in the Bendigo Football League. The tall forward made his preseason debut against Collingwood Football Club in the first round of the 2013 NAB Cup.

He made his home and away season debut for the Bulldogs in Round 16 of the 2014 AFL season against Geelong.

In 2012 and 2013 he played for Williamstown Seagulls in the Victorian Football League, the Bulldogs' VFL affiliated team. In 2014 he played for the Footscray Bulldogs in the VFL, with the club choosing to field a stand-alone, rather than affiliated VFL team.

On 23 July 2016, Redpath suffered an ACL injury in the Western Bulldogs' 15-point loss to St Kilda. The injury ended his season, and he ultimately missed out on the club's premiership win in October.

Redpath retired at the end of the 2018 season, after battling with consistent injury troubles.
