= Jason Johannisen =

Australian rules footballer

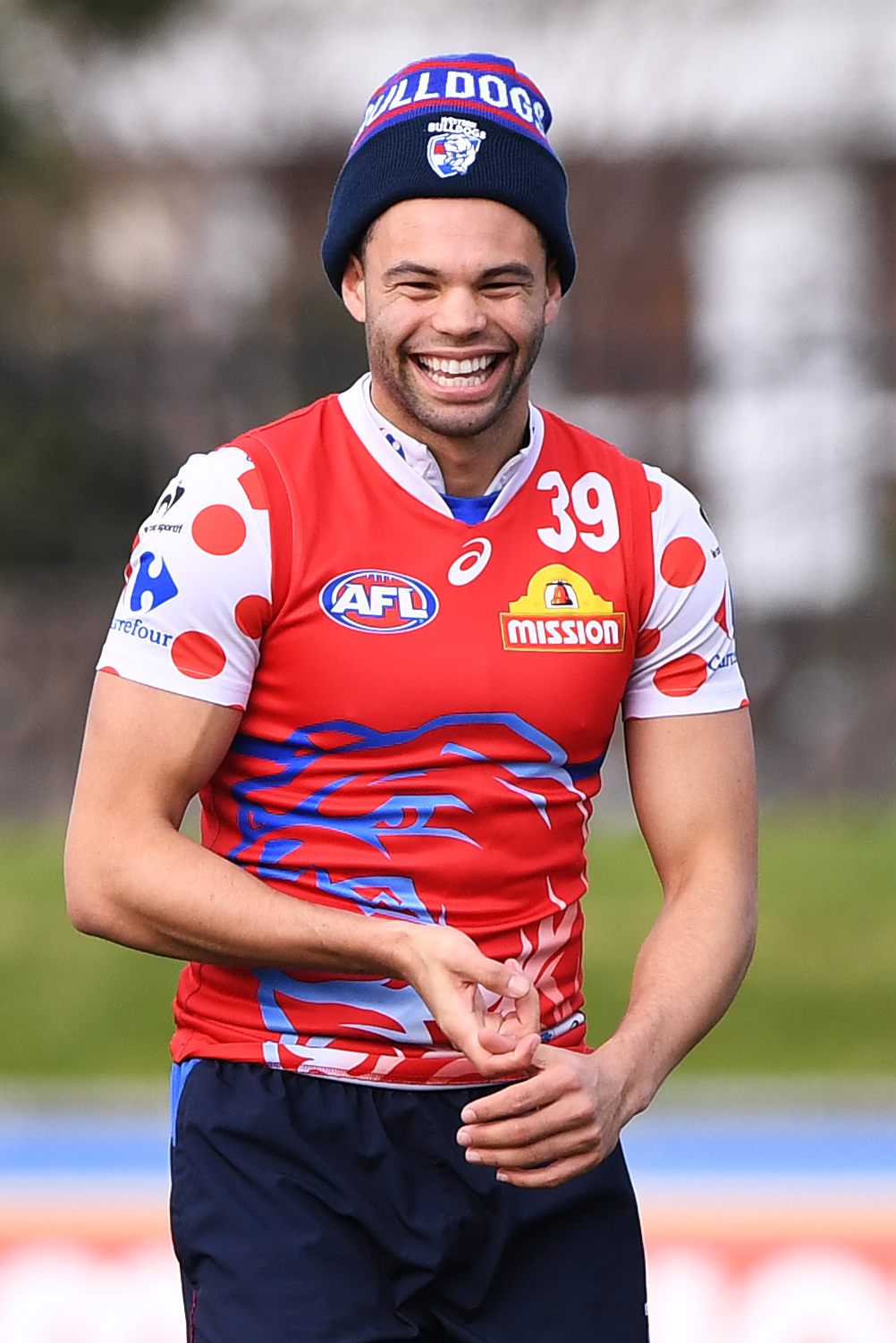
- Johannisen at Western Bulldogs training in 2018

Personal information
- Full name: Jason Johannisen
- Born: 8 November 1992 (age 33); Johannesburg, South Africa
- Original team: East Fremantle (WAFL)
- Draft: No. 39, 2011 rookie draft
- Height: 180 cm (5 ft 11 in)
- Weight: 82 kg (181 lb)
- Position: Defender

Playing career
| Years | Club | Games (Goals) |
| 2012–2025 | Western Bulldogs | 212 (77) |

Representative team honours
| Years | Team | Games (Goals) |
| 2020 | All Stars | 1 (0) |

Career highlights
- AFL premiership player (2016); Norm Smith Medal (2016)

Jason Johannisen (born 8 November 1992) is a South African–born former professional Australian rules footballer who played for the Western Bulldogs in the Australian Football League (AFL). At 180 cm (5 ft 11 in) tall and 82 kg (181 lb), he played as a running half-back who can move up forward.

Johannisen was selected by the Western Bulldogs with the 39th selection in the 2011 rookie draft. In 2016, he became an AFL premiership player after helping the Bulldogs win the Grand Final behind his Norm Smith Medal performance.

As of the end of season 2025, he has polled a total of 25 Brownlow Medal votes in his career.

== Early life ==
Johannisen was born in Johannesburg, South Africa, to mother Sonya from Zambia and father Eldrid from Durban. The family moved to Perth, Western Australia, in 2000 when Johannisen was eight years old.

Johannisen played rugby union with the Southern Lions Rugby Club in Perth as a junior before switching codes to Australian rules at the age of 15. He played his senior football with East Fremantle.

== Career ==
Johannisen was recruited by the Western Bulldogs in the 2011 Rookie Draft, with pick #39, and made his debut in Round 19 of the 2012 AFL season against North Melbourne at Docklands Stadium.

Johannisen was adjudged best afield in the Western Bulldogs' Grand Final victory over the Sydney Swans in 2016; he recorded 25 kicks among 33 disposals and 7 marks to win the Norm Smith Medal. In July 2017, he signed a five-year contract extension with Bulldogs.

Johannisen missed nine weeks in the middle of the 2023 season with hamstring tendon damage, returning for two games before a calf injury ruled him out of the remainder of the season. He then didn't play post-round nine in 2024 after he suffered a moderate-grade hamstring strain. During the 2025 pre-season, he suffered a hamstring strain at training and subsequently underwent surgery. He overcame the hamstring injury in time for round five selection.

Johannisen was delisted by the Western Bulldogs at the end of the 2025 AFL season, after 212 games, one premiership and one Norm Smith Medal. Though Johannisen never made a formal retirement announcement, his professional playing career ended in November 2025 when he was recruited by Hawthorn as a development coach. Ahead of the 2026 season, he joined Essendon District Football League club side Deer Park on a six-to-eight game playing contract.

== Statistics ==
Legend
| G | Goals | K | Kicks | D | Disposals | T | Tackles |
| B | Behinds | H | Handballs | M | Marks |
| # | Played in that season's premiership team |

| Season | Team | No. | Games | Totals | | | | | | | Averages (per game) | | | | | | | Votes |
| Season | Team | No. | Games | G | B | K | H | D | M | T | G | B | K | H | D | M | T | Votes |
|---|---|---|---|---|---|---|---|---|---|---|---|---|---|---|---|---|---|---|
| 2012 | Western Bulldogs | 39 | 3 | 1 | 0 | 29 | 20 | 49 | 9 | 3 | 0.3 | 0.0 | 9.7 | 6.7 | 16.3 | 3.0 | 1.0 | 0 |
| 2013 | Western Bulldogs | 39 | 13 | 2 | 4 | 138 | 70 | 208 | 40 | 19 | 0.2 | 0.3 | 10.6 | 5.4 | 16.0 | 3.1 | 1.5 | 0 |
| 2014 | Western Bulldogs | 39 | 11 | 2 | 4 | 111 | 67 | 178 | 42 | 26 | 0.2 | 0.4 | 10.1 | 6.1 | 16.2 | 3.8 | 2.4 | 0 |
| 2015 | Western Bulldogs | 39 | 20 | 7 | 3 | 270 | 128 | 398 | 107 | 35 | 0.4 | 0.2 | 13.5 | 6.4 | 19.9 | 5.4 | 1.8 | 4 |
| 2016^{#} | Western Bulldogs | 39 | 17 | 6 | 8 | 283 | 130 | 413 | 112 | 37 | 0.4 | 0.5 | 16.6 | 7.6 | 24.3 | 6.6 | 2.2 | 10 |
| 2017 | Western Bulldogs | 39 | 20 | 10 | 12 | 258 | 171 | 429 | 58 | 41 | 0.5 | 0.6 | 12.9 | 8.6 | 21.5 | 2.9 | 2.1 | 7 |
| 2018 | Western Bulldogs | 39 | 22 | 7 | 10 | 277 | 187 | 464 | 89 | 47 | 0.3 | 0.5 | 12.6 | 8.5 | 21.1 | 4.0 | 2.1 | 3 |
| 2019 | Western Bulldogs | 39 | 20 | 6 | 6 | 285 | 152 | 437 | 83 | 44 | 0.3 | 0.3 | 14.3 | 7.6 | 21.9 | 4.2 | 2.2 | 1 |
| 2020 (Note: The 2020 season was played with 17 home-and-away matches per team (down from 22) and 16-minute quarters with time on (down from 20-minute quarters with time on) due to the impact of the COVID-19 pandemic.) | Western Bulldogs | 39 | 17 | 6 | 5 | 165 | 102 | 267 | 65 | 29 | 0.4 | 0.3 | 9.7 | 6.0 | 15.7 | 3.8 | 1.7 | 0 |
| 2021 | Western Bulldogs | 39 | 25 | 15 | 12 | 152 | 98 | 250 | 67 | 41 | 0.6 | 0.5 | 6.1 | 3.9 | 10.0 | 2.7 | 1.6 | 0 |
| 2022 | Western Bulldogs | 39 | 8 | 8 | 5 | 54 | 36 | 90 | 32 | 11 | 1.0 | 0.6 | 6.8 | 4.5 | 11.3 | 4.0 | 1.4 | 0 |
| 2023 | Western Bulldogs | 39 | 11 | 5 | 1 | 150 | 58 | 208 | 54 | 16 | 0.5 | 0.1 | 13.6 | 5.3 | 18.9 | 4.9 | 1.5 | 0 |
| 2024 | Western Bulldogs | 39 | 9 | 0 | 1 | 142 | 53 | 195 | 60 | 11 | 0.0 | 0.1 | 15.8 | 5.9 | 21.7 | 6.7 | 1.2 | 0 |
| 2025 | Western Bulldogs | 39 | 16 | 2 | 5 | 205 | 68 | 273 | 73 | 21 | 0.1 | 0.3 | 12.8 | 4.3 | 17.1 | 4.6 | 1.3 | 0 |
| Career | | | 212 | 77 | 76 | 2519 | 1340 | 3859 | 891 | 381 | 0.4 | 0.4 | 11.9 | 6.3 | 18.2 | 4.2 | 1.8 | 25 |

== Honours and achievements ==
AFL

- Team
  - AFL premiership: 2016
- Individual
  - Norm Smith Medal: 2016
  - Tony Liberatore Most Improved Award: 2015

VFL

- Team
  - VFL premiership: 2014
