= Scoring in association football =

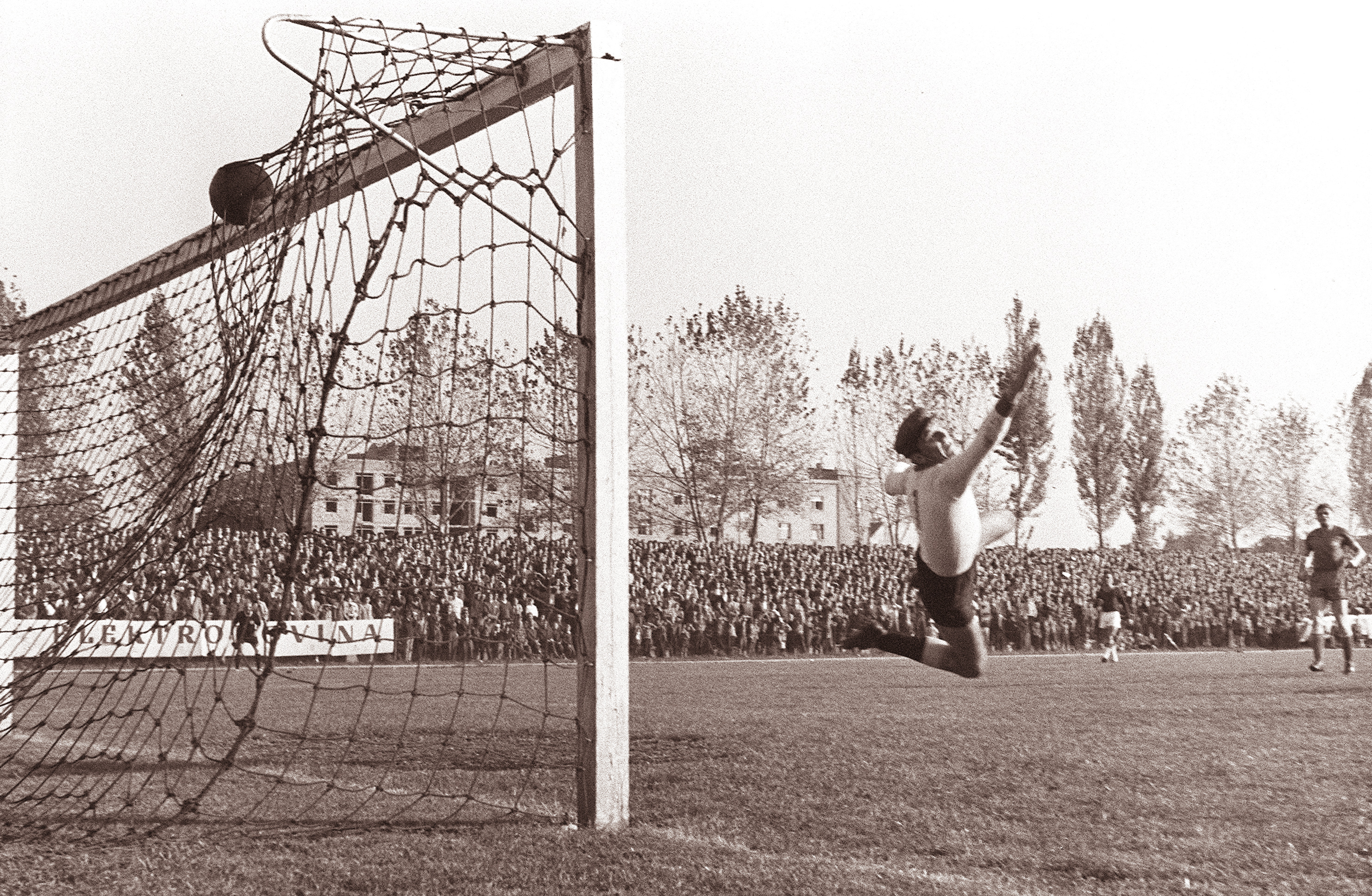
A goal being scored (1961)

In games of association football, teams compete to score the most goals. A goal is scored when the ball passes completely over a goal line at either end of the field of play between two centrally positioned upright goal posts 24 feet (7.32 m) apart and underneath a horizontal crossbar at a height of 8 feet (2.44 m) — this frame is itself referred to as a goal. Each team aims to score at one end of the pitch, while preventing their opponents from scoring at the other end. Nets are usually attached to the goal frame to catch goalscoring balls, but the ball is not required to touch the net.

== Rules ==
If the line in this diagram is the goal line between the goal posts, the only case in which a goal has been scored is position D.

Rules concerning goal scoring are described in Law 10 of the Laws of the Game:

A goal is scored when the whole of the ball passes over the goal line, between the goalposts and under the crossbar, provided that no offence has been committed by the team scoring the goal.

— Law 10: Determining the Outcome of a Match

As with other cases of the ball travelling out of the field of play, all of the ball must cross all of the line, otherwise play continues. A goal is credited to the team attacking the goal scored upon, regardless of which team actually caused the ball to enter the goal. A ball entering a goal from the action of a player defending that goal is called an own goal.

If the ball hits the frame of the goal and remains in play, play continues. Goals can be scored going in off the goal frame.

Even if serious foul play unambiguously prevents a goal from being scored, the referee cannot award a goal unless the ball enters the goal as described above; i.e., there is no provision for awarding a goal akin to the awarded goal in ice hockey, the penalty try in rugby football, or the goaltending offence in basketball (although such a provision did once exist, as described below).

A goal cannot be scored directly from a dropped ball, indirect free kick or a throw-in. Should the ball go into the opponents' goal from these without first being touched by another player, play is restarted with a goal kick. A player cannot score an own goal directly from any restart of play (other than, theoretically, a penalty kick); in that case a corner kick would be awarded. Both of these situations, especially the latter, are exceedingly rare.

As a result of rule changes introduced in 2019, it is not possible to score an attacking goal with the hands or arm. If a goalkeeper throws the ball directly into the opponent's goal from his/her own penalty area, no goal is awarded; instead a goal kick is awarded to the defending side. In practice such a situation is improbable given the distances involved, but this can occur in variations of the sport where the Laws are adapted to play on a smaller area. If the ball goes directly into the opponent's goal from the hands or arm of a player in any other circumstances, the handling is penalised as a handball offence (even if it was unintentional, or would otherwise have been legal). It remains possible to score an own goal with the hands or arm.

The 2019 rule changes also provided that a goal cannot be scored if the ball enters either goal directly after touching a match official; a dropped ball is awarded if this occurs.

If a player or team official is illegally on the field of play when that person's team scores a goal, the goal is disallowed, with a direct free kick being awarded to the opposing side.

After a goal is scored, play is restarted with a kick-off by the side which conceded the goal.

=== Deciding whether a goal has been scored ===
Most goals are relatively unambiguous, as the ball will usually strike the net attached to the goal structure indicating that it has passed over the goal line as described above. Occasionally, however, situations occur where it is difficult for officials to tell if the ball completely crossed the goal line before a rebound, save, or clearance from the goal area. Additionally, even if the ball crosses the goal line as required, a goal may be disallowed if the attacking team commits an infringement of the Laws of the Game, such as the offside offence or a foul.

As with all other decisions on the Laws of the Game, the referee is the final authority as to whether a goal is scored. The match referee is advised by assistant referees, whose view across the pitch from the sidelines may in some cases be more useful in determining whether the ball crossed the goal line or whether the attacking team committed an infringement.

Goals incorrectly awarded or disallowed due to mistakes in determining if the ball crossed the line are referred to as ghost goals. The goal net was one of the earliest tools employed to aid match officials in determining whether a goal was scored. Introduced in the 1890s, the goal net provides a simple way to help determine whether the ball passed on the correct side of the goal posts and crossbar. Although not mandated by the Laws of the Game, goal nets are now ubiquitous across most levels of organised football. Since 2012, goal-line technology has been used at the highest levels of professional football; it employs a system of cameras and/or sensors to provide the referee with a discreet signal when the ball has crossed the goal line. The video assistant referee was added in 2018 after years of trials; this is an additional assistant referee who constantly monitors video footage of the match and is empowered to advise the referee if he/she makes "clear and obvious errors" in matters, including in the awarding of goals.

== Attribution of goals ==
The Laws make no mention of attributing goals to individual players. Nevertheless, goals are almost always attributed to individuals, that player being the one who provided the final action causing the goal to be scored. Generally, this is the last player to touch the ball, notwithstanding inconsequential deflections such as failed attempts at a save. Should a player cause a goal to be scored against their own team, the goal is recorded as an own goal.

The authority on attributing goals varies between competitions. The Premier League in England has a dedicated Dubious Goals Committee for resolving attribution disputes.

For an individual player, scoring multiple goals in a game is considered a notable achievement. In association football, a hat-trick refers to the uncommon feat of scoring three goals in a single game. Awards exist for individual players who score the most goals in some competitions, such awards are often called the "Golden Boot".

While prose match reports have long mentioned when one player contributes to an attack which leads to a goal scored by another, it is only since the 1990s that statistics for such "assists" have been commonly tracked.

== Goal celebrations ==
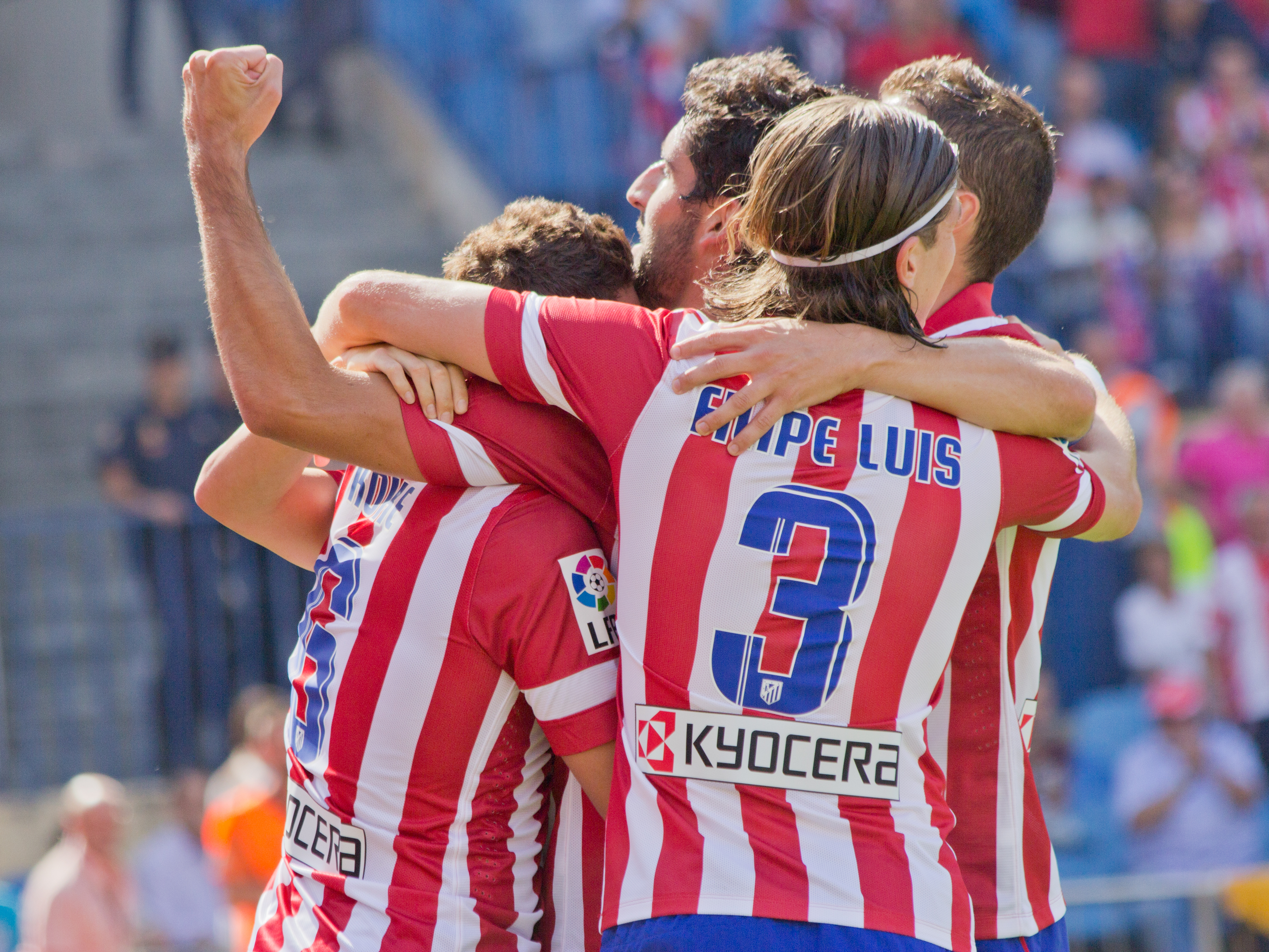
Atlético Madrid players celebrate a goal with a group hug

Players will typically celebrate scoring a goal with team mates, occasionally putting on elaborate displays for the crowd. The Laws allow this, but mandate that celebration must not be "excessive".

== Quantity of goals ==
On average, only a few scores occur per game in association football.

Scoring rate in major competitions
Competition	Average number of goals per game
2015–16 Premier League	2.70
2015–16 Bundesliga	2.83
2015–16 La Liga	2.74
2014 FIFA World Cup	2.67
2015 FIFA Women's World Cup	2.81

An analysis of several years' results from several English leagues found that 1–0 was the most common result, occurring in approximately 20% of games.

== History ==
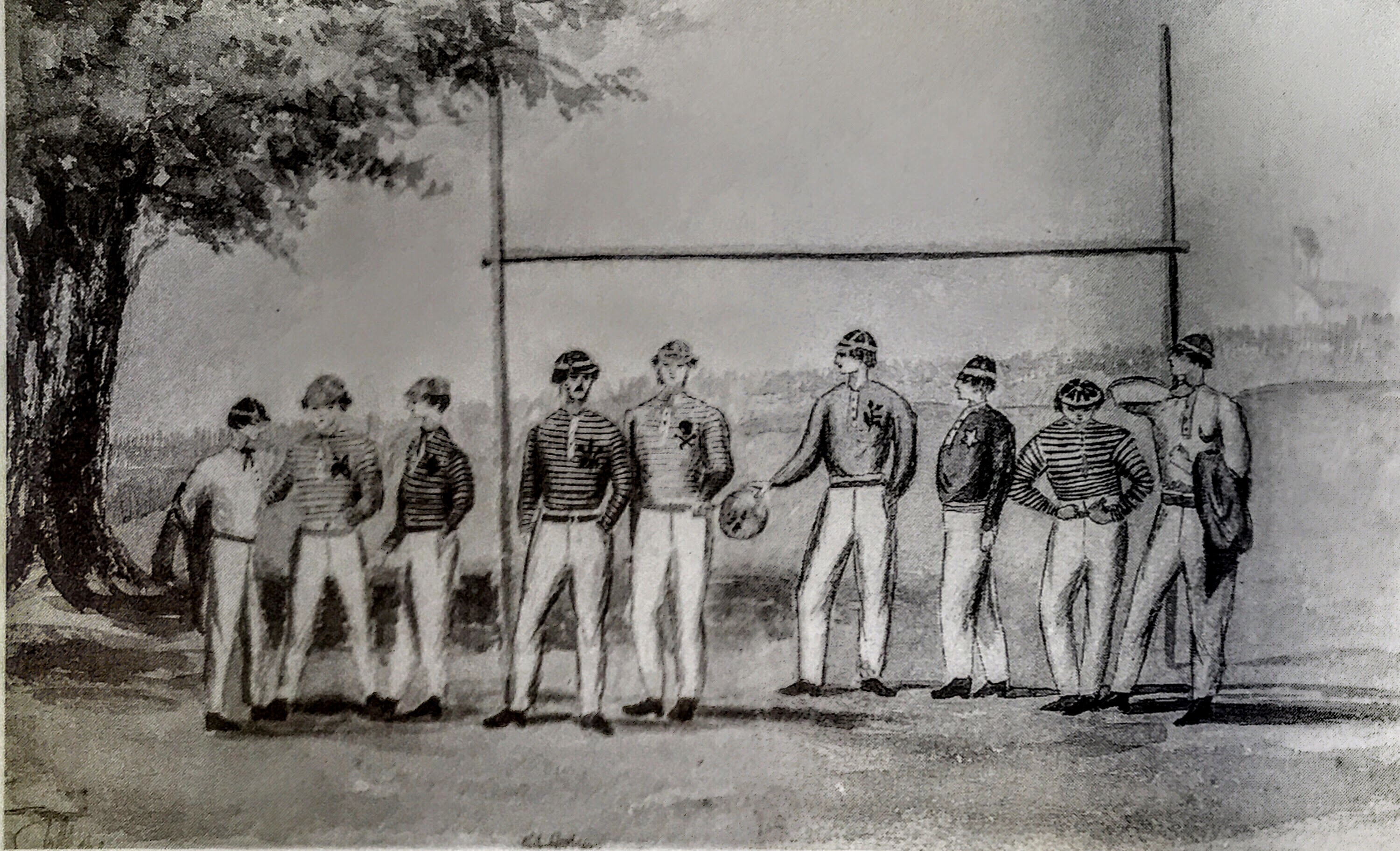
Illustration of the goals used at Rugby School (1858)

=== Before 1863 ===
In English traditional football, the object of the game was typically to convey a ball into a specified area, or to touch a specific object (the area or object often being called the "goal") defended by the opposing team. This feat might itself be called a "goal"; alternative names such as "inn" were also in use. The game might be decided by a fixed number of goals (e.g. first goal scored wins or best of three) or be played for a fixed period of time.

In the more formalised football games of English public schools and universities, the object was typically to kick the ball between goal-posts guarded by the opposition. This might be required to be above a crossbar (as in the game of football played at Rugby School), below a bar or other object (as in the Sheffield Rules of 1862) or at any height (as at Shrewsbury School).

Comparison of goals in some early football codes, c. 1863
Code	Year	Width	Height	Notes
Ball must go between posts above specified height
Rugby School	1862		10 feet	Must go above crossbar. Goal is void if ball is touched by opposition. Posts are 18 feet high. The width of the goal is not specified in the laws, but the novel Tom Brown's School Days (1857) reports it as approximately 14 feet.
Marlborough College	1863	24 feet	9 feet	
Ball must go between posts below specified height
Uppingham School	1857	"six paces"		Ball must go below cross-bar. Later version (1871) of rules specifies a goal 40 feet wide and 7 feet high.
Eton Field Game	1862	11 feet	7 feet	No crossbar; ball must not go above height of the posts.
Sheffield FC	1862	12 feet	9 feet	Must go below crossbar.
The Simplest Game	1862			Ball must go below crossbar. Goal disallowed "if thrown by hand".
Charterhouse School	1863			Ball must go below "cord". Goal void if ball "hit or otherwise impelled through by the hands of any one of the side who are not defending the goal".
Ball must go between posts at any height
Harrow School	1858	12 feet	—N/a	Goals (both the physical target and the method of scoring) are called "bases".
Melbourne FC	1860		—N/a	Width of the goal is agreed between captains. Goal is void if ball touches a post or a defending player.
Blackheath FC	1862		—N/a	Goal is void if ball touches a defending player.
Shrewsbury School	1863	40 feet	—N/a	
Cambridge Rules	1863	15 feet	—N/a	Earlier version of Cambridge Rules (1856) required ball to go under a "string".
Football Association	1863	24 feet	—N/a	Goal void if the ball is handled.
Ball must cross line (at any height)
Surrey FC	1849	—N/a	—N/a	Ball must cross "goal rope".
Winchester College	1863	—N/a	—N/a	Ball must cross goal-line. Earlier version of the game used "goal-sticks" (posts). Goal is void if "an opposing player can touch it as it passes, and then, leaping up, alight with one foot beyond the goal-line.".

=== The 1863 FA Rules ===
The size and type of goals were among the first questions decided by the Football Association (FA). At its second meeting, on 10 November 1863, the FA agreed on the following three resolutions:

- The goals should be defined by two upright posts without any tape or bar across them.
- That a goal should be scored whenever the ball was kicked between the goalposts or over the space between them.
- That the goal-posts be 8 yards apart.

The next meeting, on 17 November, added the further condition that a goal could not be scored when the ball was "thrown, knocked or carried" between the posts.

These points were reflected in the first draft of the Laws of the Game created by FA secretary E. C. Morley. Morley's proposal met with objections expressed in correspondence from J. C. Thring of Uppingham School, and also from William Chesterman of Sheffield F. C., principally on the grounds that it would be difficult to judge whether a ball that went above the height of the posts should count as a goal; Thring correctly predicted that a crossbar "w[ould] be adopted in the end". Nevertheless, this feature of the game was preserved in the Association's first published set of laws, which read:

A goal shall be won when the ball passes between the goal posts or over the space between the goal posts (at whatever height), not being thrown, knocked on, or carried

=== Subsequent developments ===
==== Introduction of tape / crossbar ====
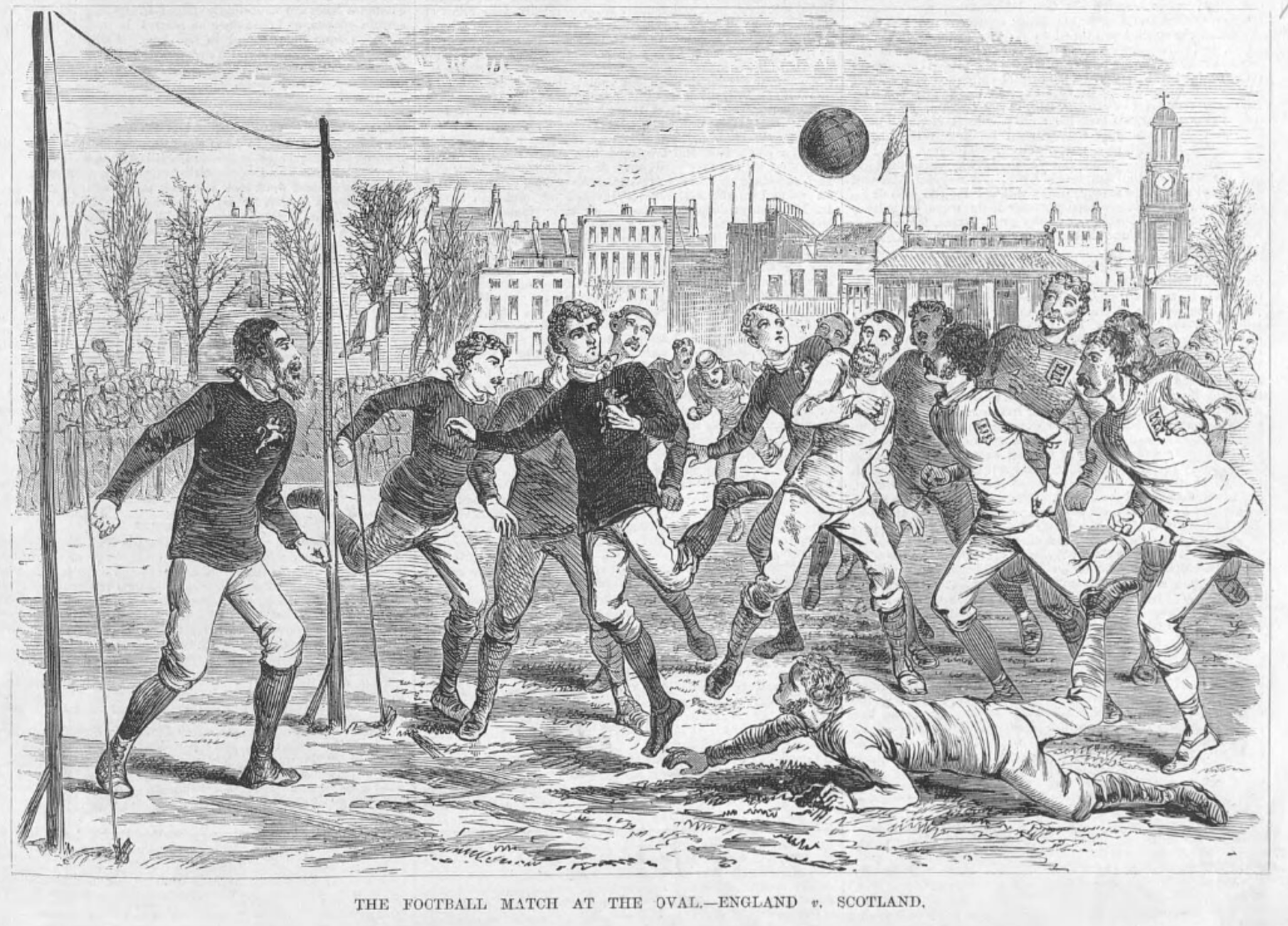
From 1866 to 1883, the laws provided for a tape between the goalposts

At the first revision of the FA rules, in 1866, a tape was introduced between the posts at a height of 8 feet, with a goal counting only if the ball went below this tape. According to a contemporary newspaper report of the meeting:

The chairman urged some strong reasons why a goal should not be won so long as the ball was between the posts at no matter what height, and quoted an instance which occurred at Reigate, where one of the opposite side raised the ball quite 90 feet in the air between the goal posts. A dispute arose as to whether the goal was won or not, and the bystanders decided that the ball was kicked between the posts, but he thought it was a most unsatisfactory goal, and was therefore decidedly in favour of goals being kicked under the tape.

In 1875, after a proposal by Queen's Park Football Club, the laws allowed the option of using either a crossbar or tape. At the International Football Conference of December 1882, it was decided to require a crossbar; this change was introduced into the Football Association's laws in 1883.

The dimensions of the goal [8 yards (24 feet) wide and 8 feet (2.6 yards) high] have remained unchanged since 1866.

==== Use of hands to score a goal ====
The original FA laws of 1863 disallowed a goal when the ball was "thrown, knocked on, or carried", even if the handling was otherwise legal. In 1882, a change in the laws, introduced by Nicholas Lane Jackson of Finchley FC and Morton Betts of Old Harrovians FC, made it possible to score an own goal by use of the hands.

In 1962, a change introduced by the Scottish Football Association permitted a goalkeeper to score a goal by throwing the ball into the opposing goal from his own penalty area. This innovation was heavily criticised in some quarters. In 1974, a further change to the laws allowed a goal to be scored when the ball was handled unintentionally by an attacker. In 2019 both of these changes were reversed:

- it was specified that a goalkeeper cannot score against the opposing team by throwing the ball directly into goal from his/her own penalty area. Should the ball go into the opponents' net in these circumstances, a goal kick is awarded to the defending team.
- it was made a handball offence for a player to "score in the opponents’ goal directly from their hand/arm, even if accidental, including by the goalkeeper"

==== Goal awarded for handball by opposition ====
The original laws of the game, in 1863, specified no punishments for infringements of the rules. In 1872, the indirect free kick was introduced as a punishment for handball. This indirect free-kick was thought to be an inadequate remedy for a handball which prevented an otherwise-certain goal. From a meeting of the Sheffield Football Association in February 1879, we have the following report:

It was proposed by Mr. T. Banks, on behalf of the Norfolk Club, to add to law 8 — "If any player of the defending side, except the goalkeeper, stop the ball with his hands within three yards of the goal, when it is going in goal, it shall count a goal to the opponents."

After a "long and noisy discussion", the change was rejected. At the 1881 meeting of the Football Association, a similar proposal was introduced by J. Arnall and J. B. Clayton of the Birmingham Football Association, but it was likewise rejected. Such a law was finally approved the next year, to become part of the FA's laws for the 1882-83 season:

When any player, other than the goal-keeper, wilfully stops a ball in the vicinity of his own goal by using his hands when, in the opinion of the umpires or referee, the ball would have passed through the goal, a goal shall be scored to his opponents.

This goal, which was similar to today's penalty try in rugby, survived as part of the game for only one season. At the International Football Conference of December 1882, it was decided to remove this law from the 1883-84 season. One commentator wrote that the rule "was the means of causing the referee a very awkward point to decide at times, and we all know the duties of the referee are heavy enough without this; and, further, the penalty, in my opinion, is too great [...] A free kick [...] is quite sufficient".

==== Goal scored from set-piece ====
The laws have at various times restricted the ability to score from a set piece situation (such as a free kick or corner-kick). If the ball goes into the goal directly from such a restart but the laws do not permit the awarding of a goal, depending on which team performed the set piece a goal kick or corner kick is awarded.

=== Summary ===
A goal may be scored directly from:
Year	Handling			Set-pieces								
Year	Keeper in own penalty area	Other		Kick-off	Dropped ball	Free kick awarded for			Penalty kick	Throw in	Goal kick	Corner kick
Year	Keeper in own penalty area	Not intentional	Intentional	Kick-off	Dropped ball	Fair catch or touch down	More serious offences (direct free kick)	Other offences (indirect free kick)	Penalty kick	Throw in	Goal kick	Corner kick
1863	—N/a	No	No	Yes	—N/a	Yes	—N/a	—N/a	—N/a	No	Yes	—N/a
1866	—N/a	No	No	Yes	—N/a	—N/a	—N/a	—N/a	—N/a	No	Yes	—N/a
1872	—N/a	No	No	Yes	—N/a	—N/a	No	—N/a	—N/a	No	Yes	Yes
1874	—N/a	No	No	Yes	—N/a	—N/a	No	No	—N/a	No	Yes	Yes
1875	—N/a	No	No	No	—N/a	—N/a	No	No	—N/a	No	Yes	No
1882	—N/a	Own goal only	Own goal only	No	—N/a	—N/a	No	No	—N/a	Own goal only	Yes	No
1888	—N/a	Own goal only	Own goal only	No	Yes	—N/a	No	No	—N/a	Own goal only	Yes	No
1890	—N/a	Own goal only	Own goal only	No	Yes	—N/a	No	No	—N/a	Own goal only	No	No
1891	—N/a	Own goal only	Own goal only	No	Yes	—N/a	No	No	Yes	Own goal only	No	No
1896	—N/a	Own goal only	Own goal only	No	Yes	—N/a	No	No	Yes (de facto attacking goal only)	Own goal only	No	No
1898	—N/a	Own goal only	Own goal only	No	Yes	—N/a	No	No	Yes (de facto attacking goal only)	No	No	No
1902	Own goal only	Own goal only	Own goal only	No	Yes	—N/a	No	No	Yes (de facto attacking goal only)	No	No	No
1903	Own goal only	Own goal only	Own goal only	No	Yes	—N/a	Yes	No	Yes (de facto attacking goal only)	No	No	No
1924	Own goal only	Own goal only	Own goal only	No	Yes	—N/a	Yes	No	Yes (de facto attacking goal only)	No	No	Yes
1927	Own goal only	Own goal only	Own goal only	No	Yes	—N/a	Attacking goal only	No	Yes (de facto attacking goal only)	No	No	Yes
1962	Yes	Own goal only	Own goal only	No	Yes	—N/a	Attacking goal only	No	Yes (de facto attacking goal only)	No	No	Yes
1974	Yes	Yes	Own goal only	No	Yes	—N/a	Attacking goal only	No	Yes (de facto attacking goal only)	No	No	Yes
1997	Yes	Yes	Own goal only	Yes (de facto attacking goal only)	Yes	—N/a	Attacking goal only	No	Yes (de facto attacking goal only)	No	Attacking goal only	Attacking goal only
2012	Yes	Yes	Own goal only	Yes (de facto attacking goal only)	No	—N/a	Attacking goal only	No	Yes (de facto attacking goal only)	No	Attacking goal only	Attacking goal only
2016	Yes	Yes	Own goal only	Attacking goal only	No	—N/a	Attacking goal only	No	Yes (de facto attacking goal only)	No	Attacking goal only	Attacking goal only
2019	Own goal only	Own goal only	Own goal only	Attacking goal only	No	—N/a	Attacking goal only	No	Yes (de facto attacking goal only)	No	Attacking goal only	Attacking goal only

== See also ==
- Determining the outcome of a Match (association football)
