= Ball in and out of play =

9th of the Laws of the Game of association football

Balls A, B and C are still in play as they have not wholly crossed the touchline. Ball D has completely passed over the touchline, and is out of play.

The ball in and out of play is the ninth law of the Laws of the Game of association football, and describes the two basic states of play in the game.

== In play ==
The ball remains in play from the beginning of each period to the end of that period, except when:

- The ball leaves the field by entirely crossing a goal line or touch line with or without touching the ground (this includes when a goal is scored); or
- Play is stopped by the referee (for example when The Laws have been infringed, an injured player requires medical attention, or a period of play has concluded).
- The ball touches a match official, remains on the field of play, and one of the following occurs:
  - A team starts a promising attack
  - The ball goes directly into the goal
  - The team possessing the ball changes

The first criterion can be phrased as "all of the ball must cross all of the line" and is of particular importance in decisions regarding goals. The question of whether the ball has crossed the line has often caused controversy in high-profile matches, such as in the example of Geoff Hurst's goal in the 1966 World Cup Final, that put England 3-2 up over West Germany in extra time. The Law specifically notes that the ball remains in play if it rebounds off a goal frame or corner flag (both of which are considered "neutral elements" of the game) onto the field, or in any case of the ball touching a match official that is not mentioned above. Until 2019, match officials were also considered neutral elements, so a goal that rebounded on a referee in the pitch would be considered valid, such as what happened with Brazilian referee José de Assis Aragão in a 1983 match.

The association football codes for "out of play" differ from those in sports such as basketball, volleyball, table tennis, or in some instances of gridiron football where a player can "save" a ball by playing it while it is still in the air despite being over an out-of-bounds area; instead the ball is "out" if it fully crosses over a boundary line in the air. When the ball is in play players may play the ball, contest the ball, and goals may be scored. Players are liable to punishment for committing fouls. Substitutions may not occur whilst the ball is in play.

In the case a foul is committed or misconduct occurs, the referee may "play advantage" and elect to allow play to continue if the team of the player who was victimized would be benefited if play were to continue. Once play has stopped, the referee may choose to issue punishments.

== Restarts ==
When the ball becomes out of play, the ball is put back into play by the appropriate restart. The restarts in football are:

- Kick-off: following a goal by the opposing team, or to begin each period of play. (Law 8).
- Throw-in: when the ball has entirely crossed the touch line; awarded to opposing team to that which last touched the ball. (Law 15).
- Goal kick: when the ball has entirely crossed the goal line having last been touched by an attacker; awarded to defending team. (Law 16).
- Corner kick: when the ball has entirely crossed the goal line having last been touched by a defender; awarded to attacking team. (Law 17).
- Indirect free kick: awarded to the opposing team following "non-penal" fouls (like obstruction, offside, etc.), certain technical infringements, or when play is stopped to caution/send-off an opponent without a specific foul having occurred. (Law 13).
- Direct free kick: awarded to fouled team following certain listed "penal" fouls, (Law 13).
- Penalty kick: awarded to fouled team following "penal" foul having occurred in their opponent's penalty area. (Law 14).
- Dropped-ball: occurs when the ball touches an official in the circumstances described above, or when the referee has stopped play for any other reason (e.g. a serious injury to a player, interference by an external party, or a ball becoming defective). This restart is uncommon in adult games. (Law 8).

Once the ball is out of play, the only restart is the restart appropriate for the reason the ball went out of play in the first place; subsequent actions do not change the restart. For example, if the ball goes out of play because of a foul by Team A against Team B, the restart must be a free kick to Team B even if a Team B player strikes an opponent; offending Team B player would, however, be liable for misconduct (i.e. yellow card or red card).

Note, however, that the referee may change the original restart if he realises he has made an error or on the advice of his assistant referees, provided play has not yet restarted. For example, if the ball has gone out of play because the ball was kicked into goal by Team A and the referee has signalled that a goal has been scored, but then notices that an assistant referee has indicated a foul by a Team A player immediately before the goal was scored, the referee would change to the correct restart of a free kick to Team B where the foul occurred.
