= Goal kick =

Method of returning the ball in association football

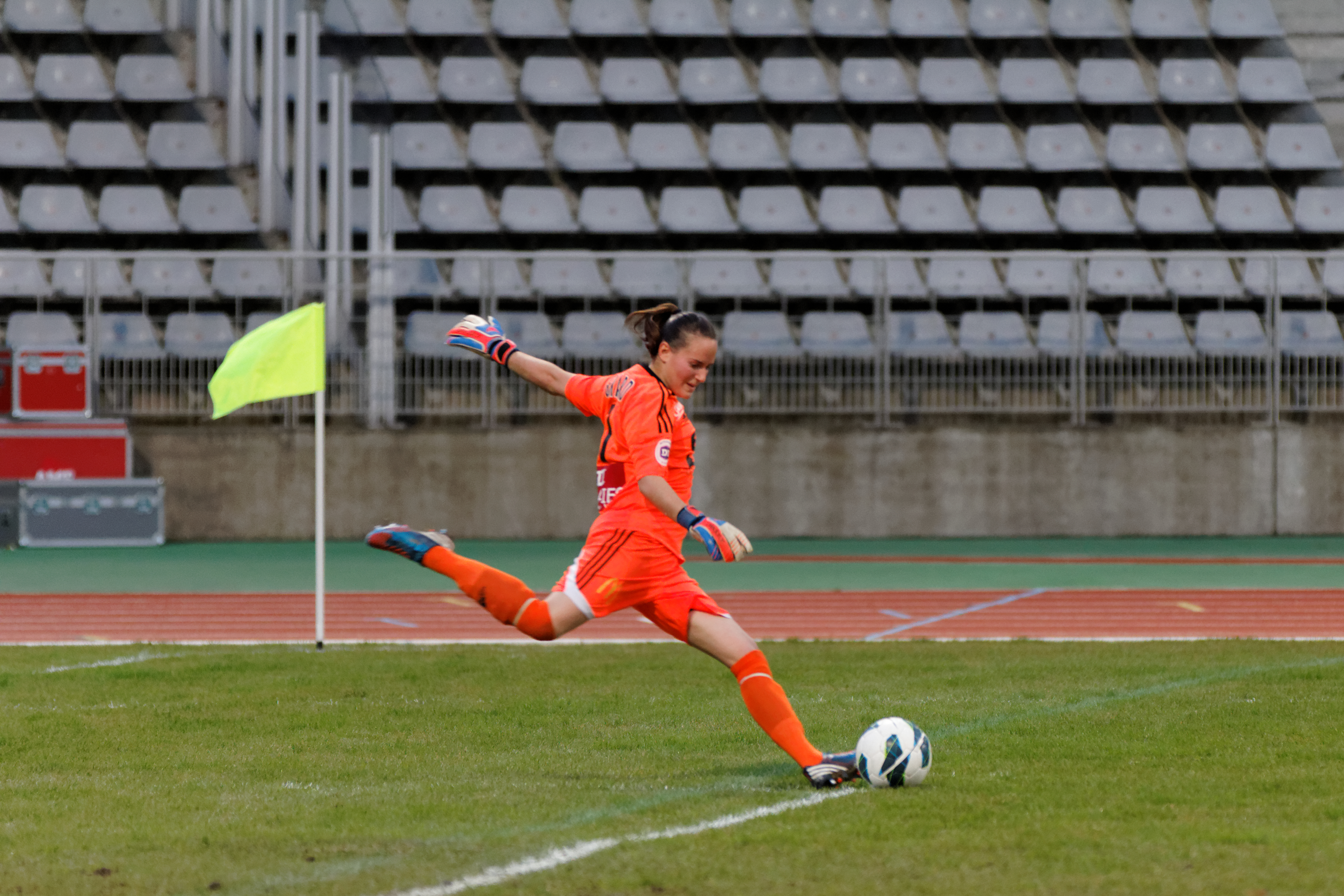
Saint-Étienne goalkeeper Méline Gérard takes a goal kick.

A goal kick is a method of returning the ball in a game of association football. Its procedure is dictated by Law 16 of the Laws of the Game.

== Award ==
A goal kick is awarded to the defending team when the ball goes out of the field of play by crossing, either on the ground or in the air, the goal line, without a goal being scored, when the last player to touch the ball was a member of the attacking team. If the last player to touch the ball was a member of the defending side, a corner kick is instead awarded to the attackers.

A goal kick is also awarded to the defending team when the ball goes directly into the goal, having last been touched by the attacking team, from a situation in which the laws do not permit an attacking goal to be scored directly. These are:

- an indirect free kick
- a throw-in by the attacking team
- a dropped ball (Note: A goal kick is awarded in this situation if the ball is not touched by at least two players following a properly taken dropped ball. An improperly taken dropped ball is retaken.)
- a ball thrown by the attacking goalkeeper from within his/her own penalty area.

The referee signals a goal kick by pointing downwards towards the goal area from which the kick is to be taken.

== Procedure ==
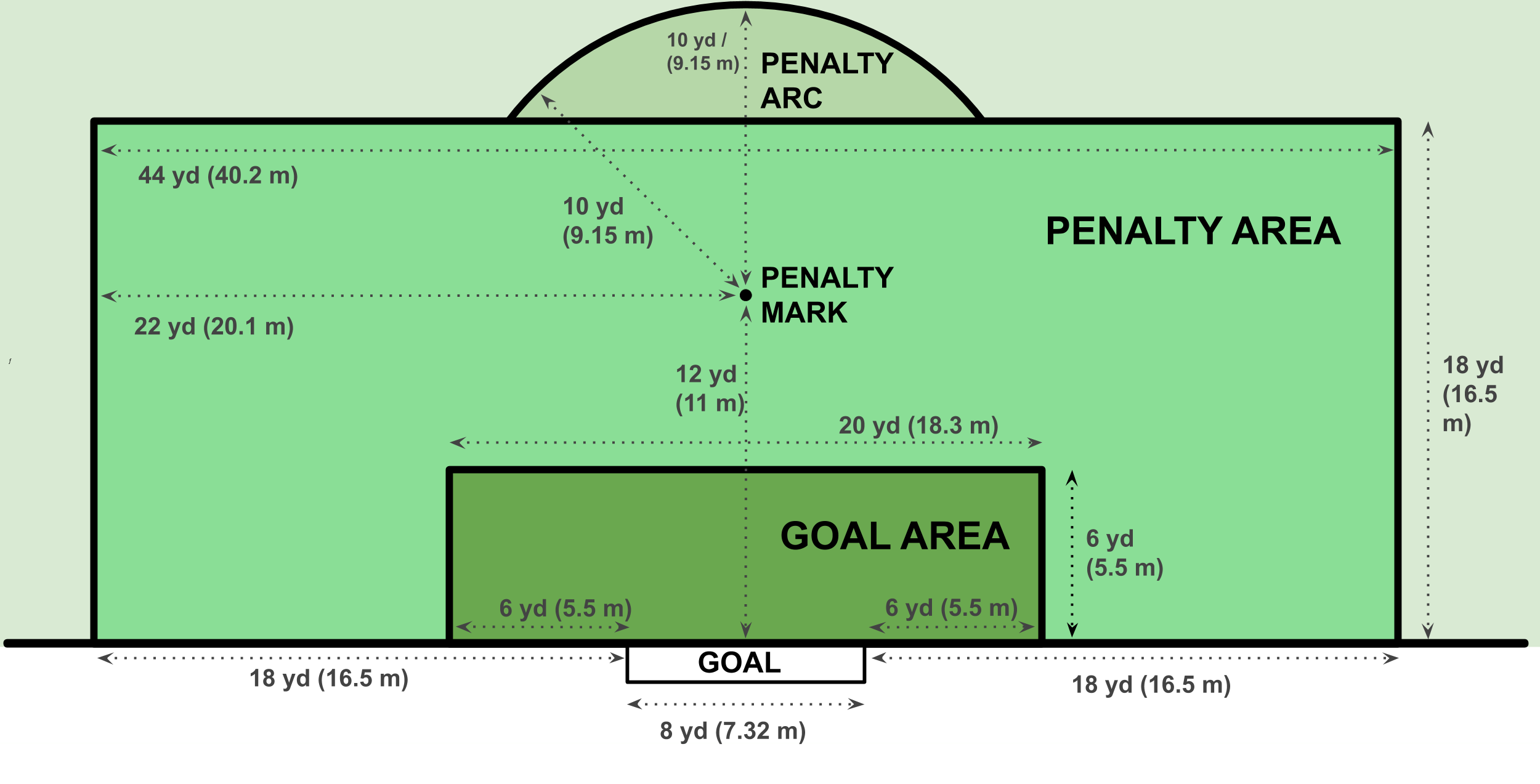
The goal

- The ball must be stationary and on the ground within the kicking team's goal area (also known as the six-yard box). All opposing players must be outside the penalty area until the ball is in play. The ball must be kicked (a goalkeeper may not pick up the ball).
- The ball becomes in play as soon as it is kicked and clearly moves. The player taking the goal kick cannot touch the ball a second time until another player touches the ball.
- A goal can be scored directly from a goal kick against the opposing team. An own goal cannot be scored from a goal kick; in the extremely rare circumstance that the ball enters the kicker's own goal before being touched by another player, a corner kick is awarded.
- A player may not be penalized for offside directly from a goal kick.

Goal kicks are often taken by goalkeepers, but any player can take them.

== Infringements ==
If the kick is taken with a moving ball, or from the wrong place, the goal kick is retaken.

Opponents must attempt to leave the penalty area before the goal kick is taken. However, if a "quick" goal kick is taken while an opponent is attempting to leave the penalty area, that opponent may touch or challenge for the ball once it is in play.

If an opposing player deliberately remains inside the penalty area, or enters the penalty area before the goal kick is taken, the goal kick is retaken. If this happens a number of times, the opposing player is booked for persistent infringement of the Laws of the Game.

If the kicker touches the ball a second time before it has been touched by another player, an indirect free kick is awarded to the opposing team from the place where the offence occurred, unless the second touch was also a more serious handling offence, which is punished by a direct free kick (or a penalty kick if within the penalty area and the kicker was not the goalkeeper) for the opposing team.

From 2026, a corner kick can be awarded to the opposition to penalise excessive delays in taking a goal kick. This occurs if the kick is not taken within five seconds of a warning from the referee.

== History ==
=== Before 1863 ===
Analogues of the goal kick are found in early codes of football. The first published set of rules for any code of football, that of Rugby School (1845), featured a "kick out" from ten yards or twenty-five yards after a team touched the ball down in its own goal area. This was the ancestor of the 22-metre drop out in modern rugby union. A similar 25-yard "kick out" was found in the first version of the Sheffield rules (1858). The Cambridge rules of 1856 provided for a kick-out from "not more than ten paces", while the Melbourne Football Club rules of 1859 stipulated a 20-yard "kick off". Published laws of the Eton field game (1857) and Harrow football (1858), meanwhile, provided for a defensive kick-off from the goal-line itself whenever the ball went behind the goal without the attacking team scoring.

=== 1863 FA rules ===
The original FA rules of 1863 defined the "free kick from the goal line", the ancestor of the goal-kick, thus:

In case the ball goes behind the goal line, if a player on the side to whom the goal belongs first touches the ball, one of his side shall be entitled to a free kick from the goal line at the point opposite the place where the ball shall be touched. If a player of the opposite side first touches the ball, one of his side shall be entitled to a free kick (but at the goal only) from a point 15 yards from the goal line opposite the place where the ball is touched. The opposing side shall stand behind their goal line until he has had his kick.

There are several differences between this "free kick from the goal line" and the modern goal-kick:

- It was awarded when the defensive team was the first to touch the ball down after it had crossed the goal-line. This contrasts with modern association football, which awards the goal-kick against the last team to touch the ball before it went out of play.
- It was taken from the goal line itself.
- It was taken in line with the spot where the ball was touched down.
- It could be taken "in such manner as the kicker may think fit"—i.e. as a punt, drop-kick, or place-kick.

It was not possible for a player to be offside from such a kick, a feature of the laws that has remained constant to the present day.

=== 1866–1873 developments ===
In 1866, the law was changed to award a goal-kick to the defending team regardless of which team touched the ball. (If the attacking team touched the ball down, it was awarded a "touch down", which served as a tie-breaker if the match ended level on goals; however the defending team was still awarded a goal-kick.) In 1867, following an amendment proposed by Wanderers FC, the law was simplified; both the requirement for a touch-down, and the short-lived "touch-down" tiebreaker, were completely removed from the laws. The goal-kick could now be taken from any point "within six yards from the limit of [the] goal", and the opponents were forbidden from approaching within six yards of the ball.

One problem with these early rules was mentioned at the 1867 FA meeting:

Where one side was very much weaker than the other, a very great deal of time was wasted by players intentionally letting the ball go behind their own goal-line (in some instances kicking it there themselves) particularly in playing against time.

This state of affairs lasted until 1872, when the corner-kick law was introduced from Sheffield rules football. Under the 1872 law, a goal-kick could be awarded only when the ball was kicked directly over the goal (by either side). When the ball crossed the goal-line to the side of the goal, a corner-kick was awarded to either the attacking or defensive side, depending on which team last touched the ball before it went out of play. This law was rewritten the next year (1873) on the basis of a proposal by Great Marlow FC: a goal kick was awarded when the ball was kicked out of play over the goal-line by the attacking side. The kick had to be taken from within six yards of the nearest goal post.

The 1873 law ran:

When the ball is kicked behind the goal-line by one of the opposite side, it shall be kicked off by any one of the players behind whose goal line it went, within six yards of the nearest goal post; but if kicked behind by any one of the side whose goal line it is, a player of the opposite side shall kick it from the nearest corner flag-post. In either case no other player shall be allowed within six yards of the ball until kicked off.

=== Subsequent changes ===
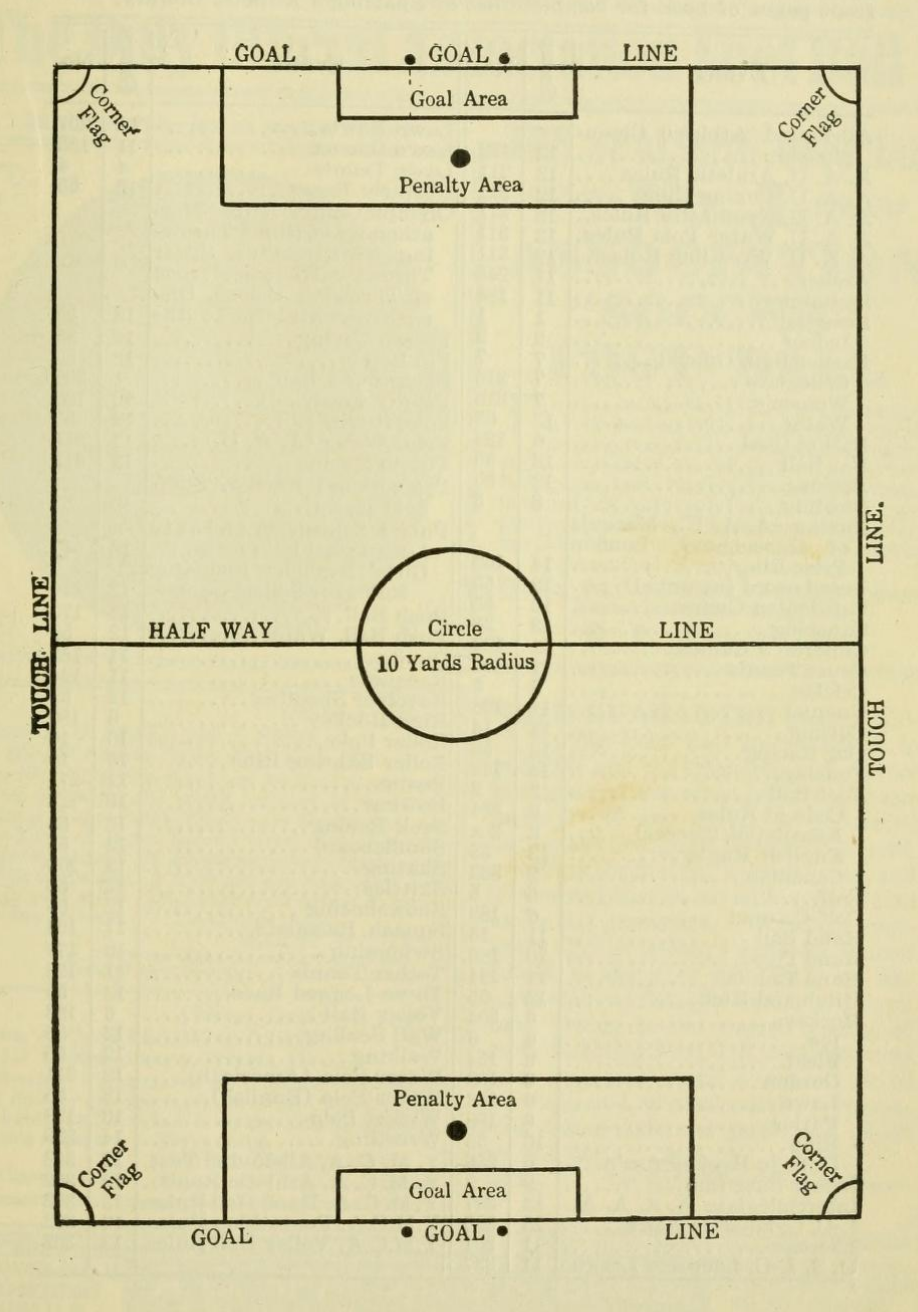
The laws of 1902 introduced the modern goal area

=== Name ===
The phrase "goal kick" is recorded in general usage as early as 1867, but does not appear in the laws of the game until 1890. Before this, phrases such as "kick it off from the goal line" were used.

=== Position of the kick ===
The goal kick of 1873 was taken from "within 6 yards of the goal post nearest the point where the ball went out of play". In 1891, pitch markings were added to define the six-yard radius from each goal-post. In 1902, the term "goal area" was introduced for the place from which the goal kick was taken; it assumed its modern dimensions as a rectangle extending six yards from each goal post. The goal-kick had to be taken from the half of the goal area nearest to the spot where the ball went out of play. This requirement was removed in 1992, when it was permitted to take the goal-kick from any point within the goal-area. This change was made in order to "eliminate[] one of the common timewasting tactics".

=== Position of opponents ===
In 1913 and 1914, the distance opponents were required to retreat was increased from six yards to ten yards. In 1948, opponents were required to be completely outside the penalty area when the goal-kick was taken.

=== Putting the ball into play ===
In 1905, it was specified that the ball "must make a complete circuit or travel the distance of its circumference" before being in play. In 1936, after a proposal by the Scottish Football Association, a new restriction was added: it was specified that the goal-kick must leave the penalty area before becoming in play; if the ball does not leave the penalty area, the kick has to be retaken. The goalkeeper was also explicitly forbidden from "receiv[ing] the ball into his hands from a goal-kick in order that he may thereafter kick it into play". In 2019, the requirement that the ball had to leave the penalty area was removed: the ball became in-play as soon as it was kicked and clearly moved.

=== Scoring a goal from a goal kick ===
In 1890, it was forbidden to score a goal directly from a goal-kick. In 1997, the laws were amended to allow a goal to be scored directly from a goal-kick, but only against the opposing team.

=== Touching the ball twice from a goal kick ===
In 1890, the player taking the goal kick was forbidden from touching the ball a second time before it had touched another player.

=== Punishment for infringement ===
In 1890, an indirect free-kick was awarded to the opposition when the player taking the goal kick touched the ball twice. In 1939, it was clarified that this penalty did not apply if the ball was touched twice before it had entered play by leaving the penalty area—in that case the kick was to be retaken instead.

In 1905, encroachment by the opposition at a goal-kick was also punished with an indirect free-kick. This penalty was removed in 1937. In 1997, the laws explicitly stated that, in the case of encroachment by the opposition, the kick should be retaken.

=== Summary ===
This table describes all kicks awarded to the defending team after the ball goes out of play over the goal line, including the defensive corner kick from the 1872 laws.

Date	Terminology used in laws	Awarded when	Location	Minimum distance required (opponents)	Ball must leave penalty area	Kicker may play ball again before it is touched by another player	Attacking goal may be scored	Own goal may be scored	Player may be offside
1863	Free kick from the goal line	Ball first touched by a member of the defending team after going out of play	From the goal-line, in line with the place where the ball was touched down	None	—N/a	Yes	Yes	Yes	No
1866	"Kick it off from the goal line"	In all cases	From the goal-line, in line with the place where the ball was touched down	None	—N/a	Yes	Yes	Yes	No
1867	Kick-off	In all cases	Within 6 yards of "the limit of the goal"	6 yards	—N/a	Yes	Yes	Yes	No
1872	Kick-off OR "Kick (it) from the nearest corner flag"	Ball goes out of play directly above the goal OR Ball last touched by a member of the attacking team before going out of play	Within 6 yards of "the limit of the goal" (if ball went directly above the goal) From the corner-flag nearest the point where the ball went out of play (otherwise)	6 yards	—N/a	Yes	Yes	Yes	No
1873	"Kick(ed) off"	Ball last touched by a member of the attacking team before going out of play	Within 6 yards of the goal post nearest the point where the ball went out of play	6 yards	—N/a	Yes	Yes	Yes	No
1890	Goal kick	Ball last touched by a member of the attacking team before going out of play	Within 6 yards of the goal post nearest the point where the ball went out of play	6 yards	—N/a	No	No	No	No
1902	Goal kick	Ball last touched by a member of the attacking team before going out of play	The half of the goal area nearest the point where the ball went out of play	6 yards	No	No	No	No	No
1913/1914	Goal kick	Ball last touched by a member of the attacking team before going out of play	The half of the goal area nearest the point where the ball went out of play	10 yards	No	No	No	No	No
1936	Goal kick	Ball last touched by a member of the attacking team before going out of play	The half of the goal area nearest the point where the ball went out of play	10 yards	Yes	No	No	No	No
1948	Goal kick	Ball last touched by a member of the attacking team before going out of play	The half of the goal area nearest the point where the ball went out of play	Must be outside the penalty area	Yes	No	No	No	No
1992	Goal kick	Ball last touched by a member of the attacking team before going out of play	Anywhere within the goal area	Must be outside the penalty area	Yes	No	No	No	No
1997	Goal kick	Ball last touched by a member of the attacking team before going out of play	Anywhere within the goal area	Must be outside the penalty area	Yes	No	Yes	No	No
2019	Goal kick	Ball last touched by a member of the attacking team before going out of play	Anywhere within the goal area	Must be outside the penalty area	No	No	Yes	No	No
