= Fouls and misconduct (association football) =

Unfair act by a football player

A Venn diagram showing the relationship between fouls and misconduct in association football, with examples. The offside offence is an example of a technical rule infraction that is neither a foul nor a misconduct. The referee is given considerable discretion as to the rules' implementation, including deciding which offences are cautionable "unsportsmanlike" conduct.

In the sport of association football, fouls and misconduct are acts committed by players which are deemed by the referee to be unfair and are subsequently penalised. An offence may be a foul, misconduct or both depending on the nature of the offence and the circumstances in which it occurs. Fouls and misconduct are addressed in Law 12 of the Laws of the Game.

A foul is an unfair act by a player, deemed by the referee to contravene the game's laws, that interferes with the active play of the match. Fouls are punished by the award of a free kick (possibly a penalty kick) to the opposing team. A list of specific offences that can be fouls are detailed in Law 12 of the Laws of the Game (other infractions, such as technical infractions at restarts, are not deemed to be fouls); these mostly concern unnecessarily aggressive physical play and the offence of handling the ball. An offence is classified as a foul when it meets all the following conditions:

1. It is committed by a player (not a substitute);
2. It occurs while the ball is in play;
3. It is committed against an opponent (for fouls concerning contact or conduct between players).

For example, a player striking the referee or a teammate is not a foul, but may be considered misconduct.

Misconduct is any conduct by a player that is deemed by the referee to warrant a disciplinary sanction (caution or send-off). Misconduct may include acts which are, additionally, fouls. Unlike fouls, misconduct may occur at any time, including when the ball is out of play, during half-time and before and after the game, and players, team officials and substitutes may be sanctioned for misconduct.

Misconduct will result in the offender either receiving a caution (indicated by a yellow card) or being dismissed ("sent off") from the field (indicated by a red card). A dismissed player cannot be replaced; their team is required to play the remainder of the game with one fewer player. A second caution results in the player being sent off. The referee has considerable discretion in applying the Laws; in particular, the offence of unsporting behaviour may be used to deal with most events that violate the spirit of the game, even if they are not listed as specific offences.

The system of cautioning and dismissal has existed in the Laws since 1881. Association football was the first sport to introduce penalty cards to indicate the referee's decisions, a practice since adopted by many other sports. The first major use of the cards was in the 1970 FIFA World Cup, but they were not made mandatory at all levels until 1992.

== Categories of fouls ==
The laws divide fouls into two categories depending on the type of free kick awarded to the opposition, either a direct or indirect free kick.

=== Direct free kick offences ===
Direct free kick offences are the most common type of foul. If a direct free kick is awarded in the penalty area of the offending player's team, a penalty kick is awarded.

The majority of fouls concern contact between opponents. Although contact between players is a part of the game, the Laws prohibit most forceful contact, meaning that, unlike other football codes, a tackle in association football is required to be predominantly directed against the ball rather than the player in possession of it. Specifically the laws prohibit charging, jumping at, kicking (or attempting to kick), pushing, striking (or attempting to strike), tripping (or attempting to trip), tackling or challenging an opponent in a manner considered to be careless, reckless or "using excessive force". Being careless makes it an offence, being reckless makes it a cautionable offence and using excessive force makes it a sending-off offence. Such classification of contact is a matter of judgement for the referee.

The handball offence is also penalised with a direct free kick. Players in association football are prohibited from touching the ball below the armpit while the ball is in play, with the exception of the goalkeeper in their penalty area. When determining a handball offence, not every touch of the player's hand/arm to the ball is an offence. The area of the arm in line with the bottom of the armpit and above is allowed to touch the ball. Unavoidable accidental contact is not penalised - such as if the ball is struck against a player's arm at short range and the player could not have reasonably avoided the contact. However, if the player has positioned their arm so as to make their body "unnaturally bigger" and contact occurs, this is considered handball. Additionally, if a player scores in the opponent's goal with their hand or arm, even if accidental and unavoidable, this is considered handball and the goal does not stand. The goalkeeper also has the same rules regarding handballs outside of the penalty area. If the goalkeeper handles the ball inside the penalty area when not allowed to do so, an indirect free kick is awarded.

Direct free kicks are also awarded for holding an opponent, impeding them with contact, biting or spitting at other persons, throwing an object (other than the ball) at an opponent or match official, or making contact with the ball with a held object.

=== Indirect free kick offences ===
An indirect free kick is awarded if a player:

- plays in a dangerous manner
- impedes the progress of an opponent without any contact being made
- is guilty of dissent, using offensive, insulting or abusive language and/or action(s) or other verbal offences
- prevents the goalkeeper from releasing the ball from their hands or kicks or attempts to kick the ball when the goalkeeper is in the process of releasing it
- initiates a deliberate trick for the ball to be passed (including from a free kick or goal kick) to the goalkeeper with the head, chest, knee etc. to circumvent the back-pass rule, whether or not the goalkeeper touches the ball with their hands
- commits any other offence, not previously mentioned in the Laws, for which play is stopped to caution or send off a player

An indirect free kick is awarded if a goalkeeper, inside their penalty area, commits any of the following offences:

- touches the ball again with their hands after releasing it from possession and before it has touched another player
- touches the ball with their hands after it has been deliberately kicked to them by a team-mate, or thrown to them from a throw-in taken by a team-mate (the so called "back-pass rule")

An indirect free kick is also awarded if an offside offence occurs, though offside is not considered a foul and will never be punished by a caution or dismissal.

Indirect free kicks are taken from the place where the offence occurred, even if it was inside the offending player's penalty area. If the offence took place inside their goal area the indirect free kick is taken from the nearest point on the goal area line which runs parallel to the goal line.

=== Other offences ===
Not all infractions of the Laws are fouls. Non-foul infractions may be dealt with as technical infractions (e.g. as breaching the rules governing the restarts of play) or misconduct (these are punishable by a caution or sending-off). Persistent offences of the Laws is an offence for which the player may be cautioned.

== Misconduct ==
The referee may consider serious or persistent offences to be misconduct worthy of an official caution or dismissal from the game. Association football was the first sport to use coloured cards to indicate these actions.

=== Yellow card (caution) ===
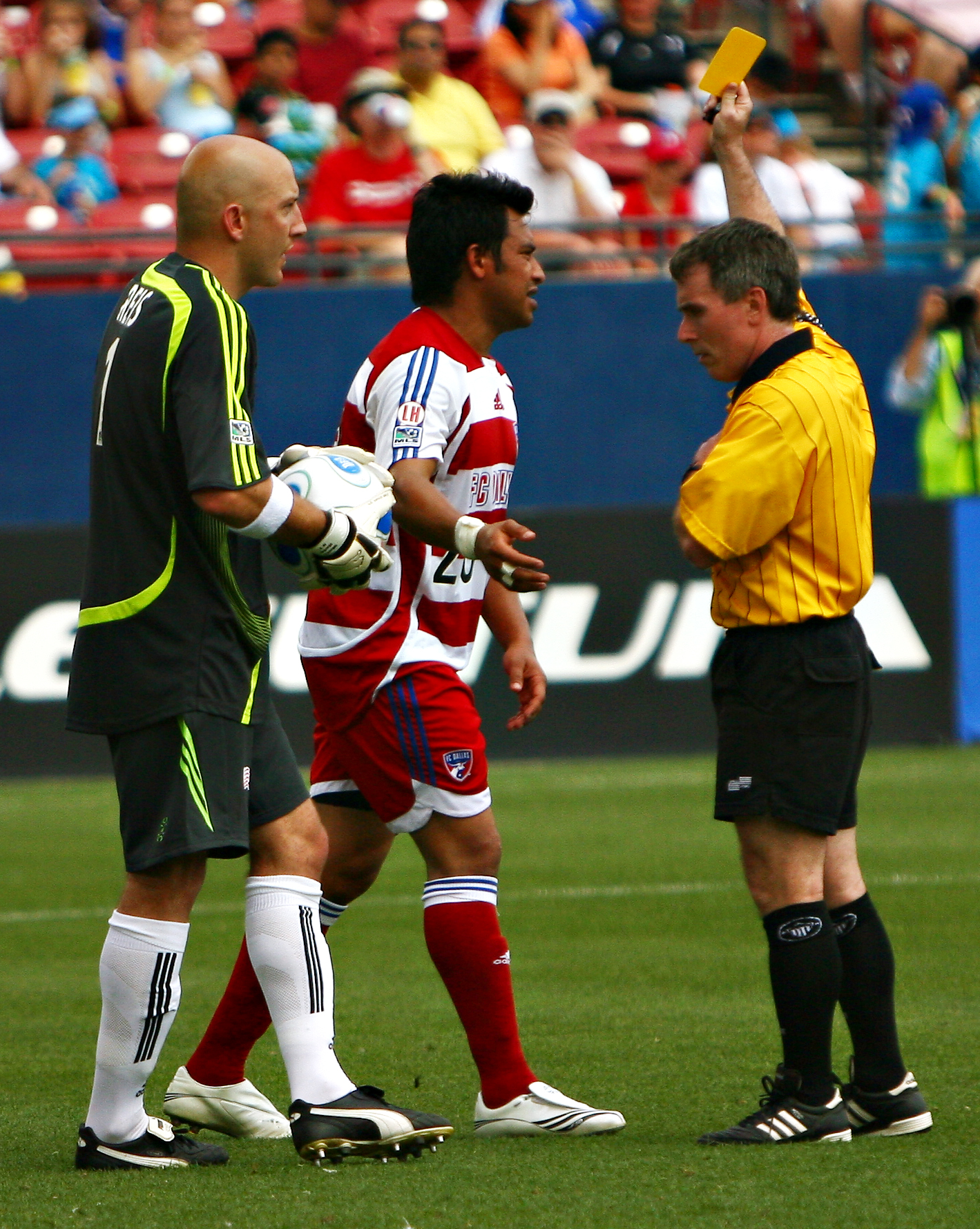
A player (middle) is cautioned and shown a yellow card.

A yellow card is shown by the referee to indicate that a player has been officially cautioned. The player's details are then recorded by the referee in a small notebook; hence a caution is also known as a "booking". A player who has been cautioned may continue playing in the game; however, a player who receives a second caution in a match is sent off (shown the yellow card again, and then a red card). Law 12 of the Laws of the Game lists the types of offences and misconduct that may result in a caution. Players can be cautioned and shown a yellow card if they commit the following offences:

- Delaying the restart of play
- Dissent by word or action
- Entering, re-entering or deliberately leaving the field of play without the referee's permission
- Failing to respect the required distance when play is restarted with a dropped ball, corner kick, free kick, or throw-in
- Persistent offences
- Unsporting behaviour (a broad category of caution-worthy acts, see below)

There are also two offences which apply in matches using the video assistant referee system:

- Entering the referee review area
- Excessively using the "review" (TV screen) hand gesture

What constitutes cautionable unsporting behaviour is generally at the referee's discretion, though Law 12 lists a number of examples. These include simulation, i.e., attempts to deceive the referee, or attempting to score by handling the ball. Fouls which are committed recklessly or fouls which are committed with the intention of stopping a promising attack (SPA) are also considered unsporting behaviour and punishable with a yellow card. Fouls which are committed with excessive force, however, or most fouls which are deliberately committed to deny a goal or an obvious goalscoring opportunity (DOGSO) are punishable by a red card.

The Laws state that goals may be celebrated, but that such celebrations should not be "excessive". Removing one's shirt or covering one's face with the shirt will result in a caution. Players may also be cautioned for climbing onto a perimeter fence or approaching/entering spectator areas in a manner that causes safety and/or security concerns.

In most tournaments, accumulating a certain number of yellow cards over several matches results in suspending the offending player for a certain number of subsequent matches, the exact number of cards and matches varying by jurisdiction (these sanctions are not regulated by the Laws of the Game). In the UEFA Champions League, for instance, accumulating two yellow cards in a tournament stage will lead to a one-game suspension. In such situations players have often been suspected of (and occasionally even admitted to) deliberately incurring a second booking in a tournament when the following game is of little importance, thus resetting their yellow card tally to zero for subsequent games (known as "cleaning cards"). However, while technically within the rules of competition, this is considered unsportsmanlike. UEFA has occasionally acted on such choices and has given additional fines and/or suspensions to the players and managers involved. For example, Sergio Ramos both in 2010 and 2019 picked up extra Champions League suspensions after publicly suggesting during interviews that a yellow card that he accrued was on purpose for card cleaning, the first of which came together with Xabi Alonso under José Mourinho's orders.

In 2017 IFAB approved temporary dismissals (sin-bins) for cautionable offences similar to that seen in other sports; however, this is only permitted for youth, veterans, disability and grassroots football. Competitions' use of this system—rather than normal yellow cards—is optional, and there are variations in how it can be implemented. For 90-minute games, the length of the temporary dismissal is 10 minutes.

=== Red card (dismissal) ===
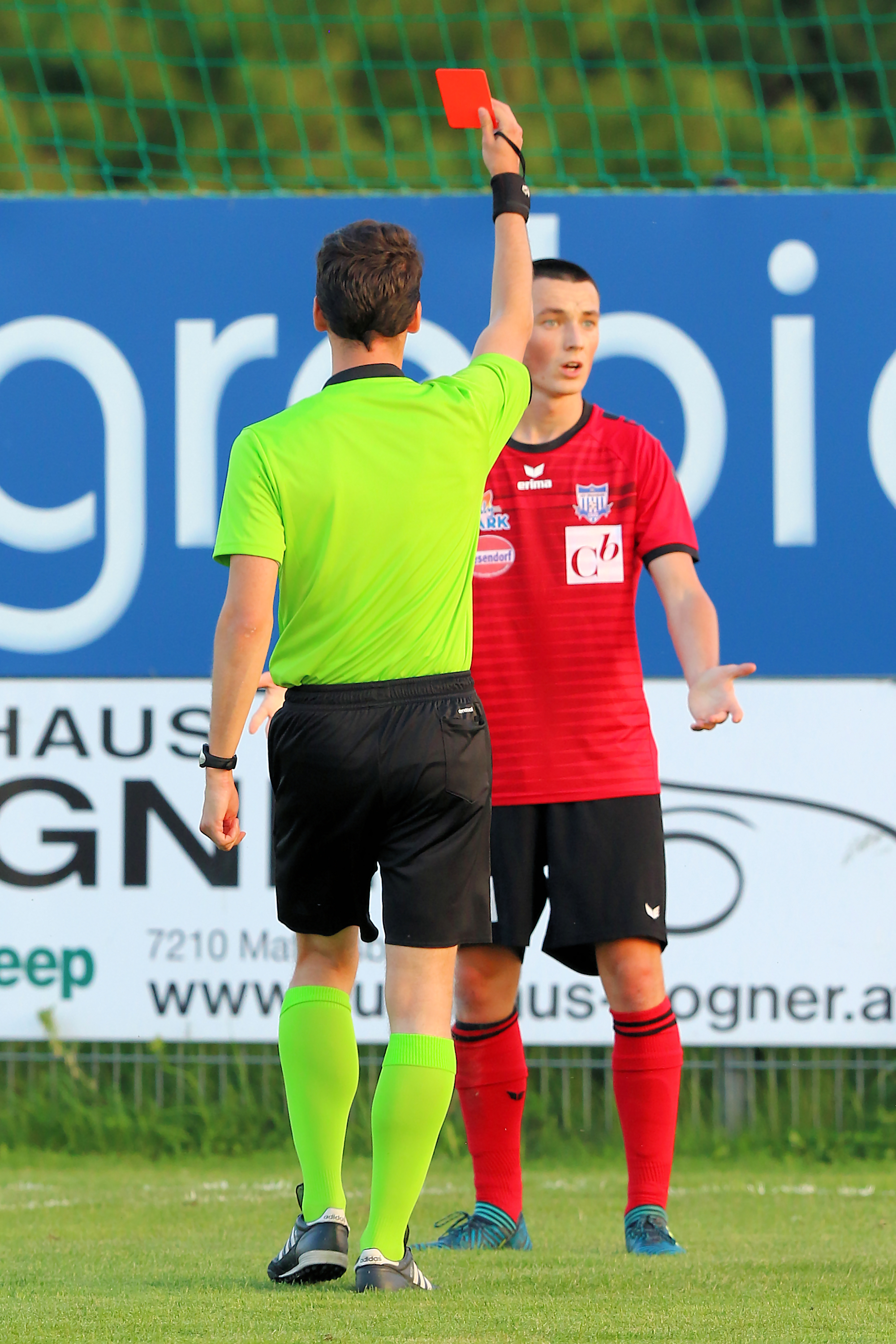
A player is shown a red card to indicate his dismissal from the game.

A red card is shown by a referee to signify that a player must be sent off. A player who has been sent off is required to leave the field of play immediately, must take no further part in the game and cannot be replaced by a substitute, forcing their team to play with one fewer player. If a team's goalkeeper receives a red card another player is required to assume goalkeeping duties, so teams usually (but are not required to) substitute another goalkeeper for an outfield player if they still have substitutes available.

Law 12 of the Laws of the Game lists the categories of misconduct for which a player may be sent off. These are:

- denying the opposing team a goal or an obvious goalscoring opportunity by a deliberate handball offence (this does not apply to a goalkeeper within their penalty area)
- denying the opposing team a goal or an obvious goalscoring opportunity by committing a deliberate handball offence outside their own penalty area
- denying a goal or an obvious goalscoring opportunity to an opponent by an offence punishable by a free kick (subject to some exceptions outlined in Law 12)
- serious foul play
- biting or spitting at someone
- violent conduct
- using offensive, insulting or abusive language and/or action(s)
- receiving a second yellow card (caution) in the same match

In matches using the video assistant referee system, the list also includes entering the video operation room.

Serious foul play is a foul committed using excessive force (i.e., "the player has far exceeded the necessary use of force and is in danger of injuring his opponent when challenging for the ball and when it is in play."). Violent conduct is distinct from serious foul play in that it may be committed by any player, substitute, or substituted player against any person, e.g., teammates, match officials, or spectators, and is not committed by a player while challenging for the ball.

Once a player has been sent off, they are not permitted to stay in the team's technical area and must leave the immediate field or playing area.

Should a team's on-field players receive a total of 5 red cards, it will be unable to field the required minimum of 7 players, resulting in the match being abandoned.

Starting in August 2020 amid the COVID-19 pandemic, IFAB and the Football Association stated that any player who deliberately coughs at others will receive a straight red card. Less severe incidents are classified as "unsporting behaviour" and will result in a yellow card.

=== History and origin ===
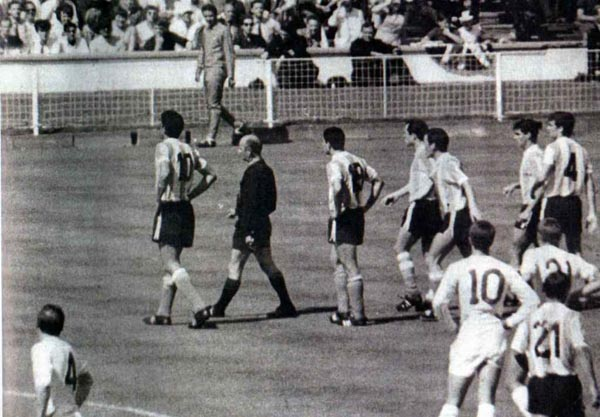
Antonio Rattín (left of referee) being sent off in the 1966 World Cup. The confusion inspired the adoption of yellow and red cards at the 1970 World Cup.

The practice of cautioning and sending off players who make serious breaches of the rules has been part of the Laws of the Game since 1881. However, the practice of using language-neutral coloured cards to indicate these actions did not follow for almost 90 years.

The idea originated with British football referee Ken Aston. Aston had been appointed to the FIFA Referees' Committee and was responsible for all referees at the 1966 FIFA World Cup. In the quarter-finals, England met Argentina at Wembley Stadium. After the match, newspaper reports stated that referee Rudolf Kreitlein had cautioned both Bobby and Jack Charlton, as well as sending off Argentine Antonio Rattín. The referee had not made his decision clear during the game, and England manager Alf Ramsey approached FIFA for post-match clarification. This incident started Aston thinking about ways to make a referee's decisions clearer to both players and spectators. Aston realised that a colour-coding scheme based on the same principle as used on traffic lights (yellow as caution, red as stop) would traverse language barriers and clarify whether a player had been cautioned or expelled. As a result, yellow cards to indicate a caution and red cards to indicate an expulsion were used for the first time in the 1970 FIFA World Cup in Mexico (though no players were sent off in that tournament). The use of penalty cards has since been adopted and expanded by several sporting codes, with each sport adapting the idea to its specific set of rules or laws.

Until 1992, a player committing a second bookable offence was shown only a red card; in that year, the IFAB mandated that a yellow card be shown before the red card.

With the help of the video assistant referee, it is now possible to upgrade a yellow card to a red card after an on-field review of the infraction. In that case, the referee will show the yellow card, make a no-good gesture, and show the red card to the offending player.

== Frequency ==
Fouls are very common occurrences in games. For example, the 2012–13 football season saw fouls-per-game rates in the major European leagues ranging from 23 in the Premier League to 32 in the Bundesliga.

Yellow cards are less common, though a typical game will feature a few – at the 2014 FIFA World Cup there were, on average, about three cautions per game. Dismissals are much rarer; that same tournament saw an average of 0.2 red cards per match.

== Referee's discretion ==
The referee has a certain degree of discretion as to the enforcement of the 17 Laws including determining which acts constitute cautionable offences under the very broad categories. For this reason, refereeing decisions are sometimes controversial. Some Laws may specify circumstances under which a caution should or must be given, and numerous directives to referees also provide additional guidance. The encouragement for referees to use their common sense used to be known colloquially as "Law 18" or the "spirit of the game". The "spirit of the game" is now explicitly mentioned in the Laws of the Game

== Advantage ==
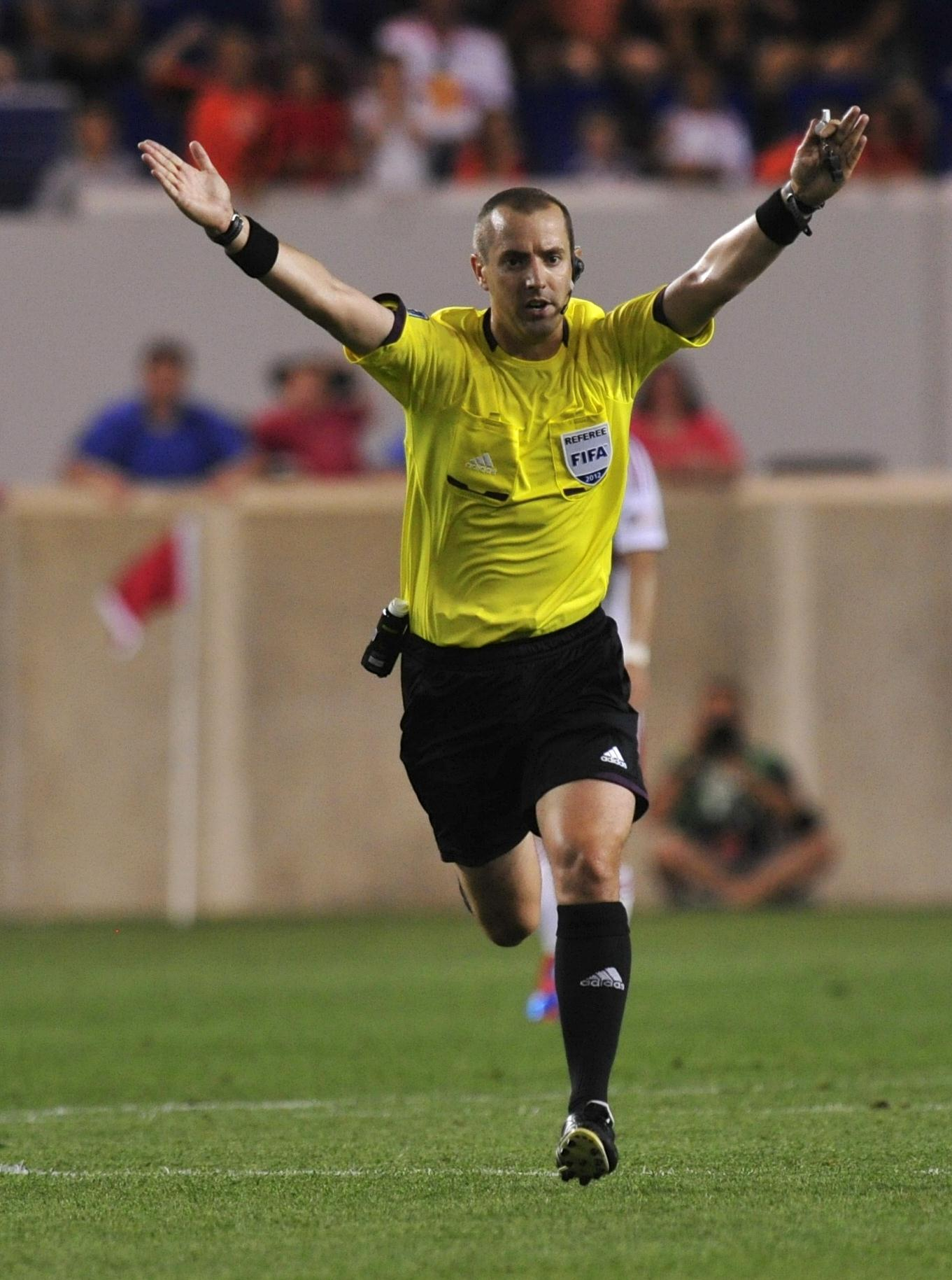
Mark Geiger signalling for advantage during a 2012 MLS match

According to the principle of advantage, play should be allowed to continue when an offence occurs and the non-offending team will benefit from ongoing play. If the anticipated advantage does not ensue within a few seconds, the referee will stop play and restart with a direct or indirect free kick or a penalty kick (depending on the offence).

== Restarts ==
If the ball is out of play when an infraction of the Laws of the Game occurs, play is restarted according to the reason the ball became out of play before the infraction. (Any infraction of the Laws of the Game that occurs while the ball is out of play can be misconduct, but is not a foul.)

If the misconduct occurs when the ball is in play, play need not be stopped to administer a caution or a dismissal, as these may be done at the next stoppage of play (this is usually the case when the opposing team would gain an advantage in having play continue). When this is the case, play is restarted according to the reason for the ball becoming out of play, e.g. a throw-in if play stopped due to the ball crossing a touchline.

If play is stopped to administer a caution or send-off:

- If a foul has occurred as well as misconduct, play is restarted according to the nature of the offence (either an indirect free kick, direct free kick or penalty kick to the opposing team)
- If no foul under Law 12 has occurred, play is restarted with an indirect free kick to the opposing team

== Team officials ==
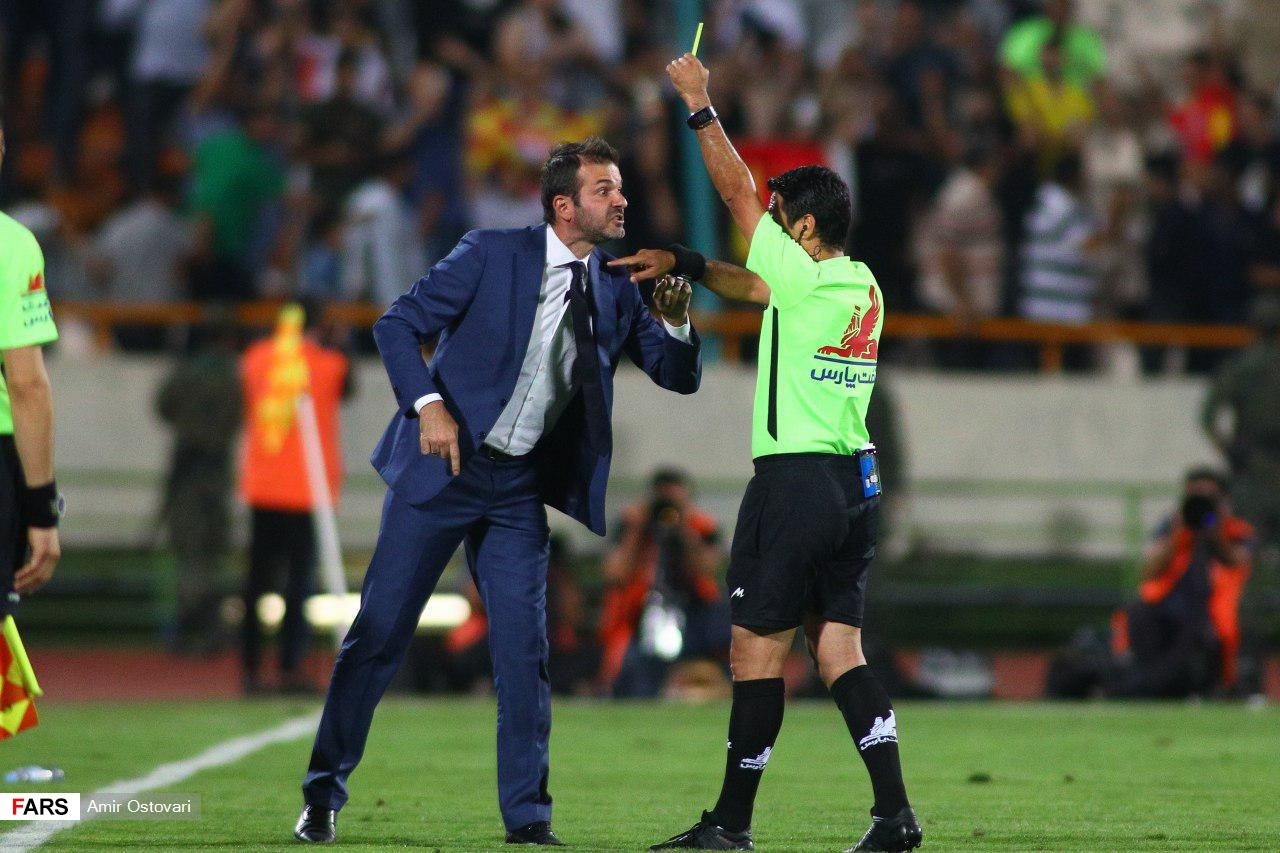
Alireza Faghani issuing a yellow card to Andrea Stramaccioni in 2019

In 2019 the IFAB approved the use of red and yellow cards for team officials and since then, in most competitions, the system operates in much the same way as the card system for players (i.e. if a team official, such as the manager or a coach, receives two yellow cards they are given a red). Depending on the seriousness of the offence, that official then may be subject to a subsequent touchline ban, a fine and/or some other form of additional punishment, depending on the rules of their competition and national football association.

Up until this law change, team officials such as managers and coaches were originally not subject to the cautionable and sending-off offences listed above, as these apply only to players, substitutes, and substituted players. As such, they were not physically shown cards if they committed an offence. However, according to Law 5 the referee could caution or dismiss team officials from their technical areas and immediate surroundings (which was still sometimes colloquially referred to as a "sending off").

== Post-match penalties ==
Many football leagues and federations impose off-field penalties for players who accumulate a certain number of cautions in a season, tournament or phase of a tournament. Typically, these take the form of suspending a player from playing in his team's next game(s) after reaching a particular number of cautions. Such off-field penalties are determined by league rules, and not by the Laws of the Game. A unique rule regarding this penalty was introduced by Major League Soccer in its reserve league of MLS Next Pro at the halfway point of Next Pro's inaugural 2022 season. A player who is sent off serves his suspension in his team's next match against the same opponent.

Similarly, a direct red card usually also results in additional sanctions, most commonly in the form of suspensions from playing for a number of future games, although financial fines may also be imposed. The exact punishments are determined by tournament or competition rules, and not by the Laws of the Game. FIFA in particular has been adamant that a red card in any football competition must result in the guilty player being suspended for at least the next game, with the only grounds of appeal being mistaken identity.

At the 2006 FIFA World Cup, any player receiving two yellow cards during the three group stage matches, or two yellow cards in the knockout stage matches had to serve a one-match suspension for the next game. A single yellow card did not carry over from the group stage to the knockout stages. Should the player pick up his second yellow during the team's final group match, he would miss the Round of 16 if his team qualified for it. However, suspensions due to yellow cards do not carry beyond the World Cup finals.

For the 2010 FIFA World Cup, the rules were changed so that any player who received two yellow cards between the beginning of the tournament and the end of the quarterfinal round (instead of the end of the group stage matches) would serve a one-match suspension for the next game. As a result, only players that received a red card (whether directly or after a second booking) in the semifinal game would not be able to play in the final.

In some league/group competitions, a team's fair play record, as measured by the total number of yellow and red cards acquired by a team, may be used as a potential tie-breaking method to determine final table position. This method was used for the first time in the World Cup's history in 2018, where Japan advanced to the round of 16 over Senegal in Group H after being tied in every other category (Japan received four yellow cards in the group, fewer than Senegal's six).

== See also ==
- Laws of the Game (association football)
- Professional foul § Association football
