= Determining the outcome of a match (association football) =

10th of the Laws of the Game

Determining the Outcome of a Match is the 10th of the Laws of the Game of association football.

It addresses two aspects of the game:

- The procedure for scoring a goal
- Procedures for determining, when necessary, the winner of a "drawn" match, in which each team has scored the same number of goals after 90 minutes.

The current name and content of Law 10 date from 2016. From 1938 until 2016, Law 10 was titled "Method of Scoring", and addressed only the procedure for scoring a goal. Procedures for breaking ties were addressed, if at all, in a supplemental section of the laws.

== Determining the winner of a drawn match ==
In most games, a draw is an allowable outcome. League competitions using the common three points for a win system award a single point to both teams for a drawn match.

However in some competitions, primarily knock-out tournaments, it is necessary to resolve a victor. Some competitions employ replays, otherwise there are three procedures permitted by Law 10 to determine the winner of a drawn match:

1. the away goals rule (for two-legged matches only)
2. extra time, consisting of two periods of 15 minutes each
3. a penalty shoot-out

Normally these are applied in the order listed above — i.e. for a two legged match, extra time is played if the away goals rule does not determine a victor. After extra time, if the score is still level, a penalty shoot-out takes place.

In a few cup competitions extra time is ignored completely and the game goes directly to penalties. Most of the time this applies to the whole tournament and is decided before the tournament begins, but on rare occasions can be decided for individual games before kick off. Examples of where this happens include the EFL Cup and County Cups.

== History ==
=== Before 1863 ===
Most codes of football from before 1863 provided only one means of scoring (typically called the "goal", although Harrow football used the word "base"). The two major exceptions (the Eton field game and Sheffield rules, which borrowed the concept from Eton) both used the "rouge" (a touchdown, somewhat similar to a try in today's rugby) as a tie-breaker.

=== The 1863 FA laws ===
The 1863 laws of the game provided for only one means of scoring: the goal. There was no procedure to break ties.

=== The "touch down" ===
In February 1866, association football briefly adopted a tie-breaker known as the "touch down" (plural: "touches down"). This "touch down" had similarities to the "rouge" used in the Eton field game and Sheffield rules, and also to the try in today's rugby codes. It was defined thus:

In case the ball goes behind the goal line, a player on the side to whom the goal belongs shall kick it off from the goal line, at the point opposite the place where the ball is touched by a player with any part of his body; but if a player of the opposite side first touches the ball, after it has gone behind the goal line of his adversary, one "touch down" shall be scored by his side, and in the event of no goals being got on either side, or an equal number of goals being got on each side, the side obtaining the greater number of "touches down" shall be the winners of the match

An example of a game being decided by "touches down" is Barnes FC v. Civil Service FC, played on Saturday December 8th, 1866. The match "resulted in a victory for the Civil Service by three touches down to none, no goal being obtained by either side". In the historic London v. Sheffield match played on March 31, 1866, "London" (a representative team from the Football Association) won by two goals and four touches down to nil.

The "touch down" lasted only one year. It was abolished in February 1867, on the basis of a proposal by Wanderers FC. FA Secretary Robert Graham later explained the benefit of its removal, writing that "the whole play is now directed to obtaining a goal, whereas formerly this chief object in the game was frequently lost sight of in the efforts to obtain a 'touch down'".

=== Explicit statement that the goal is the only means of scoring ===
In 1923, the following statement was added to the Laws of the Game:

A game shall be won by the team scoring the greater number of goals. If no goals have been scored, or the scores are equal at the end of the game, the game shall be drawn

This change was made in order to prevent the use of the corner-kick as a tie-breaker.

=== Drawing of lots ===
Between 1867 and 1970, the laws of the game said nothing about the means by which ties should be broken in a tournament which required a definitive result. The most common practice, as seen in the 1928 Olympics "consolation final" and the semi-final of the 1968 European Championships, was to use a random procedure such as drawing of lots or tossing a coin.

=== Use of corner-kicks as tiebreaker ===
Despite the 1923 law mentioned above, the Dublin City Cup (until the 1960s) and Dublin and Belfast Inter-City Cup (in the 1940s) used corner count as a tiebreaker in knockout rounds.

=== Penalty shoot-out ===
The use of drawing of lots was "discontinued" by the International Football Association Board at its 1970 meeting, to be replaced by the penalty shoot-out.

=== Golden goal ===
The golden goal, originally known as "sudden death", was a procedure introduced experimentally in 1993, by which the match ended immediately if a goal was scored during extra-time and the team scoring it declared to be the winner. The golden goal was used at the 1998 and 2002 World Cup tournaments, before being abolished in 2004. During the latter part of this period, a variant known as the "silver goal" was also used.
