= International Football Conference =

1882 meeting of football associations

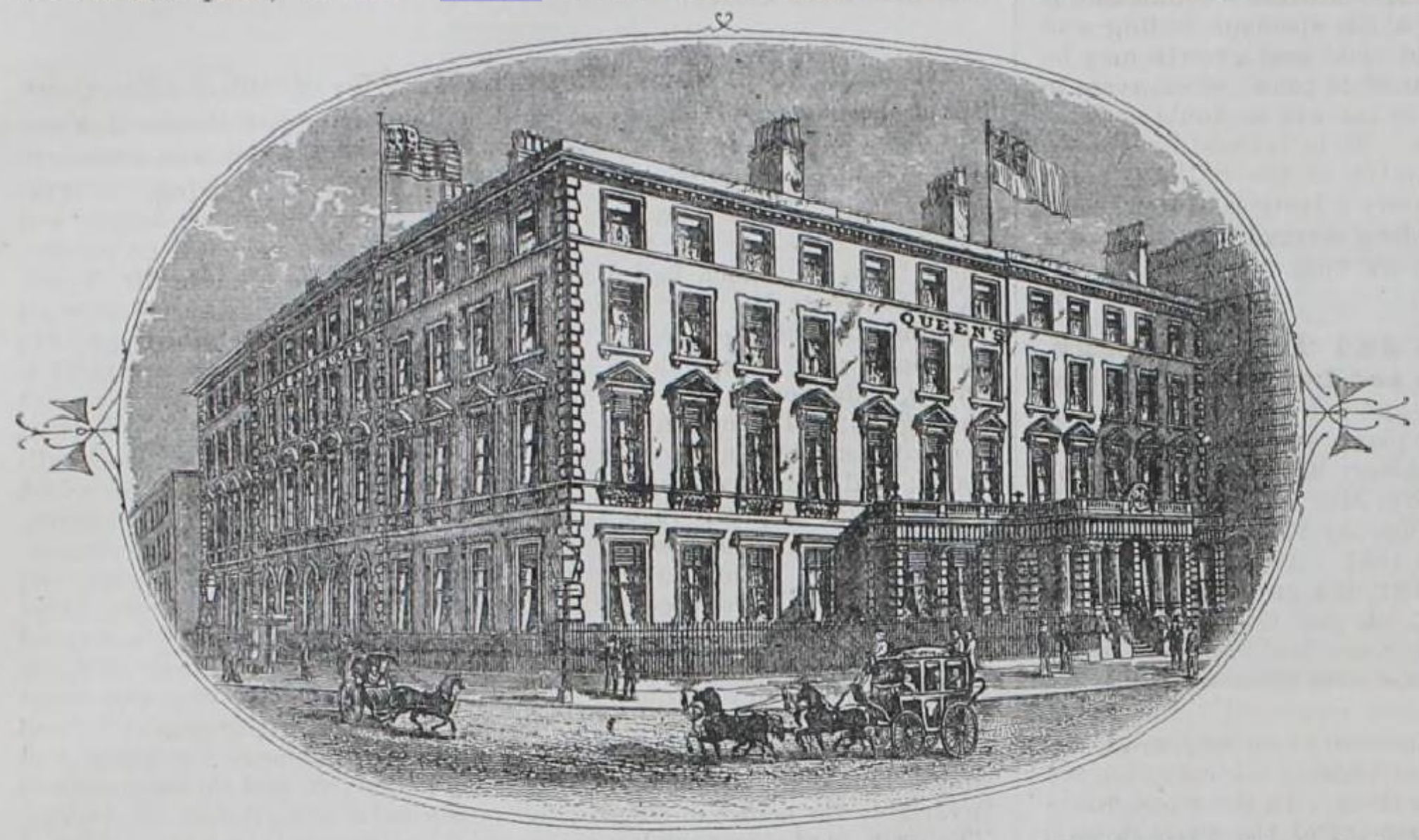
The conference was held at the Queen's Hotel, Manchester

The International Football Conference was a meeting of the four football associations of the Home Nations, held in 1882.

== History ==
England's Football Association (The FA), the Scottish Football Association (SFA), the Football Association of Wales (FAW) and the Irish Football Association (IFA) met at the Queen's Hotel, Manchester, on 6 December 1882. A precursor to the International Football Association Board, the meeting's major purpose was to address inconsistencies between the laws of the various associations, particularly between England and Scotland.

== Resultant actions ==
Among the changes resulting from the conference were:

- The throw-in had to be taken from over the head with two hands (the FA had previously allowed the ball to be thrown in with one hand).
- The use of a crossbar was made mandatory (the FA had previously permitted either a tape or a crossbar to be used).
- The kickoff had to be kicked forwards (not previously required by the FA).
- The award of an automatic goal for handball by an opponent that prevented a goal (adopted by the FA earlier that year) was eliminated.
- It was no longer possible to be offside from a corner-kick (previously allowed by the FA).
- The boundary of the field of play should be marked by a touch line as well as by flags.

The new laws were used in the international matches of the 1882–83 season (with the exception of the first, England v. Wales, which still used the old rules). They took general effect in the Laws of the Game at the beginning of the 1883–84 season.

== Delegates ==
- Francis Marindin (president of the FA, representing England)
- William Peirce Dix (vice-president of the FA and treasurer of the Sheffield Football Association, representing England)
- John Wallace (member of the Committee of the SFA, representing Scotland)
- Thomas Laurie (vice-president of the SFA, representing Scotland)
- Llewellyn Kendrick (representing Wales)
- W. R. Owen (representing Wales)
- John Sinclair (vice-president of the IFA, representing Ireland)
- J. M. McCallery (secretary of the IFA, representing Ireland)
