= Back-pass rule =

Association football rule

In association football, the back-pass rule prohibits the goalkeeper from handling the ball in most cases when it is kicked or thrown to them by a teammate. It is described in Law 12, Section 2 of the Laws of the Game.

== Award ==
Goalkeepers are normally allowed to handle the ball within their own penalty area. Once they have control of the ball in their hands, opposition players may not challenge them for it. However, the back-pass rule prohibits goalkeepers from handling the ball after it has been deliberately kicked to them by a team-mate or directly after a throw-in taken by a team-mate. Deliberate back-passes with parts of the body other than the foot, such as their head, chest, shin, or knee, are allowed as the laws define a kick as using a foot. Despite its name, the "back-pass rule" does not apply only to backwards kicks or throw-ins. Handling by the goalkeeper is forbidden regardless of the direction the ball travels.

The penalty for the offence is an indirect free kick. This is awarded from the position where the handling occurred, unless it is within the 6-yard goal area, in which case the kick is taken from the point on the 6-yard line closest to the point of the offence.

=== Tricks to circumvent the rule ===
Players are not permitted to attempt to use a deliberate trick to pass the ball to their goalkeeper with a part of the body other than the foot to circumvent the rule. This includes flicking the ball up with the foot and then heading the ball back to the goalkeeper, or heading a ball on the ground that would otherwise be regularly playable with the foot.

The United States Soccer Federation (USSF) has provided the following guidance to goalkeepers about when they cannot use their hands on the ball in the penalty area:

The offense rests on three events occurring in the following sequence:

- The ball is kicked (played with the foot, not the knee, thigh, or shin) by a teammate of the goalkeeper,
- This action is deemed to be deliberate, rather than a deflection or miskick, and
- The goalkeeper handles the ball directly (no intervening touch of play of the ball by anyone else)

When, in the opinion of the referee, these three conditions are met, the violation has occurred. It is not necessary for the ball to be "passed", it is not necessary for the ball to go "back", and it is not necessary for the deliberate play by the teammate to be "to" the goalkeeper.

— Jim Allen (USSF National Instructor and National Assessor), Ask A Soccer Referee

== History and impact ==
The back-pass rule was introduced in 1992 to discourage time-wasting and unduly defensive play after the 1990 World Cup was widely criticised as excessively dull, rife with back-passing and goalkeepers holding up the ball to waste time. Daniel Jeandupeux, then the manager of Ligue 1 team Caen, proposed the rule in December 1990 in a letter to the FIFA technical committee after analysing data from Ligue 1 goalkeepers. Six months later, FIFA planned an experiment to be run during the 1991 U17 World Championship to trial it, after which it was formally adopted by IFAB and FIFA in May 1992. The last tournament prior to the back-pass rule was UEFA Euro 1992.

The first games played with the new rule were at the 1992 Summer Olympics. Early matches played under the new rule caused some confusion among defenders; in the very first game, Italy fell foul of it, allowing the United States to score from an indirect free kick awarded 15 yards from goal.

In 1997, the back-pass rule was extended to prevent goalkeepers handling the ball when received directly from a team-mate's throw in.

A goal scored by Bayern Munich from an indirect free kick, awarded for a back-pass late in a game between them and Hamburg, was decisive in Bayern's winning the 2000–01 Bundesliga.

The back-pass rule is considered one of the most popular and successful rule changes in the modern game. As well as reducing dull play, it also required goalkeepers to become more proficient with playing the ball with their feet, and has been cited as the start of the evolution of the playmaking "sweeper-keeper".
