= Dropped-ball =

Method of restarting play in association football

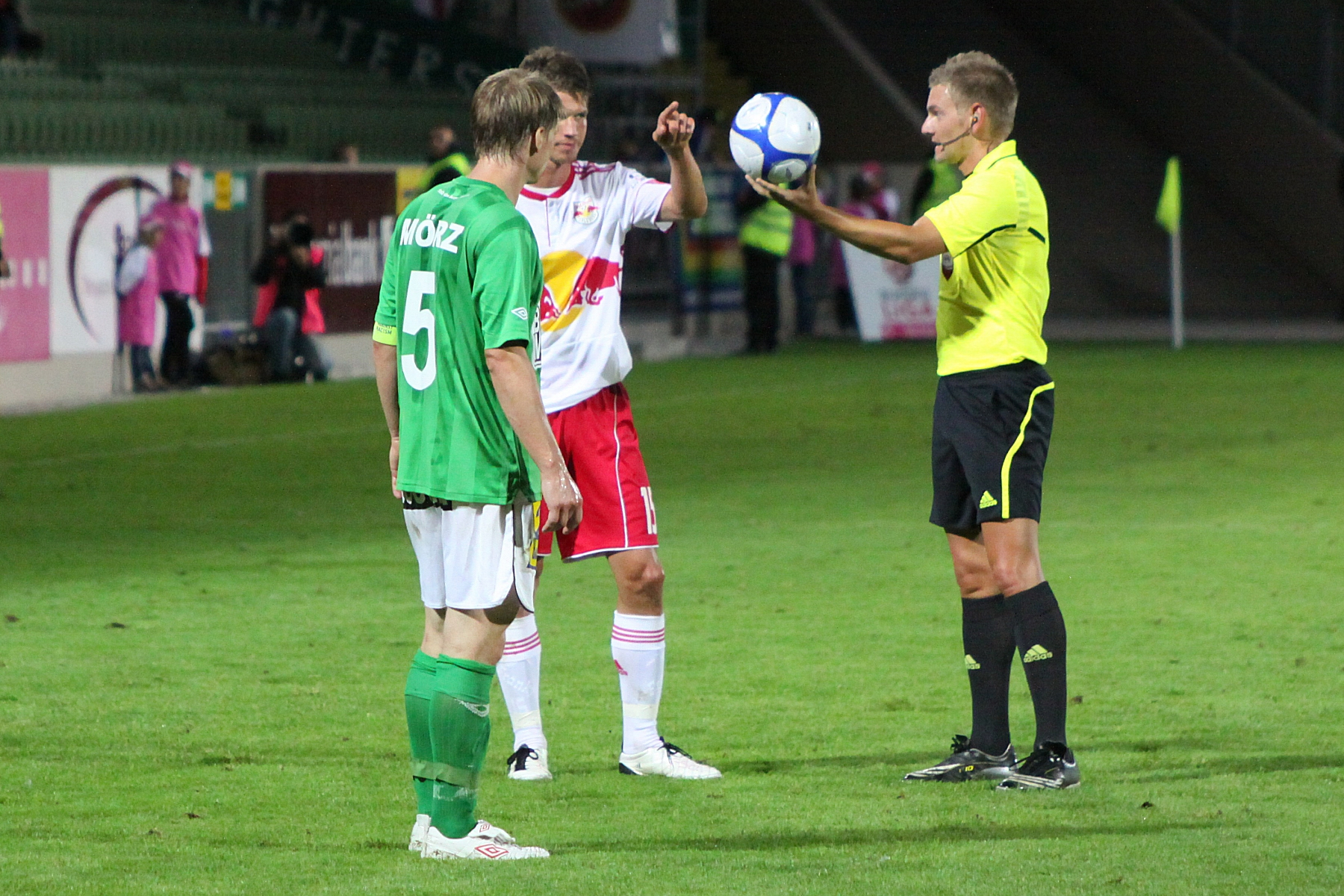
Dropped-ball in football (prior to 2019)

A dropped-ball (or drop-ball) is a method of restarting play in a game of association football. It is used when play has been stopped due to reasons other than normal gameplay, fouls, or misconduct. The situations requiring a dropped-ball restart are outlined in Law 8 and Law 9 of the Laws of the Game; Law 8 also contains the dropped-ball procedure.

== Award ==
A dropped ball is used to restart play when the referee has stopped play, and the laws do not specify a different method of restarting the match; a full list is given below.

In games which use video assistant referees (VAR), if a VAR review determines that play should not have been stopped, such as when a decision to award a penalty is reversed, play is restarted with a dropped ball at the point of the incorrect call.

== Procedure ==
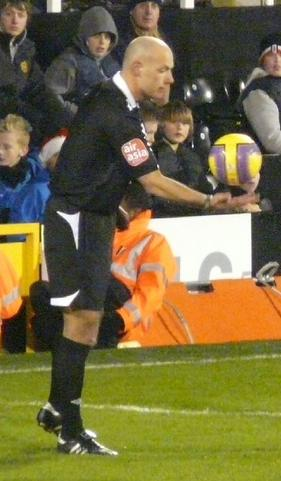
Howard Webb performing a dropped-ball in a Premier League match in 2007

Following changes to the Laws of the Game effective from June 2019, the dropped ball is explicitly awarded to a specific player:

- the goalkeeper of the defending team, if the ball was in the penalty area when play was stopped, or the ball was last touched in the penalty area
- a player of the team that last touched the ball, in all other cases.

The ball is dropped by the referee at the point where the ball was last touched by a player, official, or outside agent, unless this is within the penalty area (or the ball was in the penalty area when play was stopped), in which case the ball is dropped within the penalty area.

All players of either side, other than the designated player, must be 4 metres (4.4 yd) away from the ball until it touches the ground.

The ball becomes in play as soon as it touches the ground. No player may touch the ball until it has touched the ground. If the ball leaves the field of play before it has been touched by a player (including if the ball enters either goal), the drop-ball is retaken.

== Infringements ==
If a player touches the ball before it touches the ground, the drop-ball is retaken. If a player persistently touches the ball before it touches the ground, and the referee believes that the player is deliberately doing so, this may be considered misconduct and the referee may caution the player with a yellow card for delaying the restart of play.

A goal may not be scored from a dropped ball until it has been touched by two different players. If the ball enters either goal without having been touched by two players, the result is a goal-kick or corner-kick. A dropped ball is the only restart which allows the first player who touches the ball to touch it a second time without penalty.

== Situations in which the dropped ball is used ==
The following are the situations in which the 2020 Laws of the Game specify that play should be restarted with a dropped ball:

- the crossbar becomes displaced or broken
- the ball becomes defective
- an outside agent enters the field of play
- a player suffers a serious injury, unless the injury was caused by an offence
- a spectator blows a whistle which interferes with play
- an extra ball, other object or animal enters the field of play and interferes with play
- the referee signals a goal before the ball has passed wholly over the goal line
- a player commits a physical offence inside the field of play against any person other than a player, team official or match official
- after a penalty kick has been taken, the ball rebounds into the field of play from the goalkeeper, crossbar or goalposts and is then touched by an outside agent
- the ball touches a match official, remains on the field of play, and one of the following occurs:
  - a team starts a promising attack
  - the ball goes directly into the goal
  - the team in possession of the ball changes
- the referee stops play for any other reason for which the Laws do not define the method of restart

== History ==
In 1888, a new law was added to the rules of association football allowing the referee to restart the game after a temporary suspension of play by "throwing up the ball at the spot where play was suspended". The ball could not be played until it had touched the ground. In 1905, the referee was instructed to "throw the ball down" rather than up, and in 1914, to "drop the ball".

In 1984, a special case was added for a dropped ball within the goal area; instead of being dropped at the point where play was suspended, the ball would be dropped at the closest point on the six-yard line. This change was made in order to avoid "crowding" and "jostling".

=== Scoring from a dropped ball ===
In 2012, scoring a goal directly from a dropped ball was forbidden (if the dropped ball was kicked directly into the goal, a goal-kick or corner-kick was awarded instead). The justification given by the Football Association for this change was that "[t]here have been a number of occasions where goals have been scored from 'uncontested' dropped balls ... We then have the unseemly situation where the opposition allows the team to score from the kick-off without any players trying to stop them in order to rebalance the game." In 2016, it was further required that the ball must touch two players before going into the goal; if it does not do so, the goal is disallowed and play is restarted with a goal-kick or corner-kick.

=== Remedy for infringement ===
In 1891, an infringement of the laws at a dropped ball (for example, playing the ball before it touched the ground) was punished with an indirect free kick to the opposition. This penalty was removed in 1937, and replaced with a retake.

=== Abolition of contested dropped ball ===
In 2019, the contested dropped ball was abolished. The dropped ball still took place, but was awarded to:

- the goalkeeper of the defending team, if the ball was in the penalty area when play was stopped, or the ball was last touched in the penalty area
- a player of the team that last touched the ball, in all other cases.

All other players, of both teams, were required to be at least 4 metres from the ball until it touched the ground.

Before 2019, any number of players from either side were allowed to contest a dropped ball. However, this rarely occurred, as many players sportingly elected to kick the ball out of play when an event requiring the stoppage of play – most often an injury – occurred. Contested drop balls became exceedingly rare in the modern game. After the situation had been resolved, the opposing team typically, but not always, conceded possession to the other team after returning the ball into play via the throw-in, as a gesture of good sportsmanship. When the referee did stop play and a dropped ball occurred, a similar return of possession was almost always made from the restart, with the ball being kicked back to the original possessors' defence.

The official justification given for this change was that "[t]he [previous] dropped ball procedure often leads to a 'manufactured' restart which is 'exploited' unfairly (e.g. kicking the ball out for a throw-in deep in the opponents' half) or an aggressive confrontation. Returning the ball to the team that last played it (had possession) restores what was 'lost' when play was stopped, except in the penalty area where it is simpler to return the ball to the goalkeeper. To prevent that team gaining an unfair advantage, all players of both teams, except the player receiving the ball, must be at least 4 m (4.5 yds) away."

The 2019 rule change also provided for a dropped ball restart for certain situations involving the ball touching a match official. Previously, the match officials were considered part of the field and play continued if the ball touched an official regardless of the result, unless the ball went out of play for a different reason such as going off the field. The rule change allows the referee to stop play and award a dropped ball if either team gains an advantage from the ball touching an official. The official explanation for this change was that "[i]t can be very unfair if a team gains an advantage or scores a goal because the ball has hit a match official, especially the referee".

=== Summary ===
Date	Location of restart	Receiving player		Minimum distance of other players	Manner of dropping	The first player to touch the ball scores		Remedy for infringement
Date	Location of restart	Inside the penalty area	Outside the penalty area	Minimum distance of other players	Manner of dropping	A goal	An own goal	Remedy for infringement
1888	Last location of the ball in play	None (any player may contest the ball)			Throw the ball up	Goal awarded		None specified
1891	Last location of the ball in play	None (any player may contest the ball)			Throw the ball up	Goal awarded		Indirect free kick
1905	Last location of the ball in play	None (any player may contest the ball)			Throw the ball down	Goal awarded		Indirect free kick
1914	Last location of the ball in play	None (any player may contest the ball)			Drop the ball	Goal awarded		Indirect free kick
1937	Last location of the ball in play	None (any player may contest the ball)			Drop the ball	Goal awarded		Retake
1984	Same as above, if outside the goal area; otherwise, the nearest point on the six-yard line	None (any player may contest the ball)			Drop the ball	Goal awarded		Retake
2012	Same as above, if outside the goal area; otherwise, the nearest point on the six-yard line	None (any player may contest the ball)			Drop the ball	Goal kick	Corner kick	Retake
2019	Penalty area in which the stoppage or the last touch occurred; otherwise, the location of the last touch	Goalkeeper of the defending team	Player of the team that touched the ball last	4 metres (4.4 yd)	Drop the ball	Goal kick	Corner kick	Retake
2025	Penalty area in which the stoppage occurred; otherwise, the last location of the ball in play	Goalkeeper of the defending team	Same as above, if the team in possession can't be determined; otherwise, the player of the team in possession	4 metres (4.4 yd)	Drop the ball	Goal kick	Corner kick	Retake
