= Throw-in =

Method of returning the ball in association football

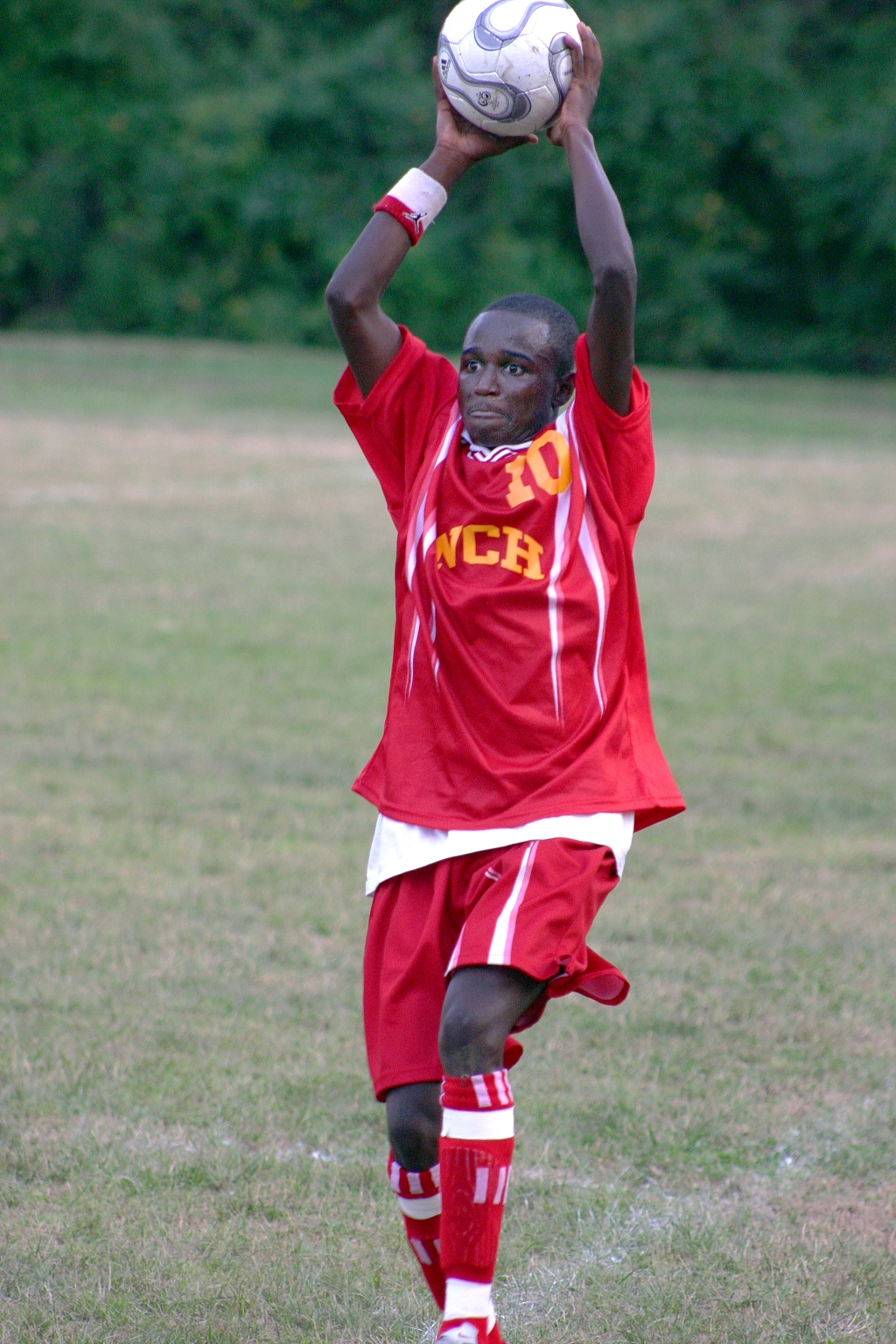
A player taking a correct throw-in during a game.

A throw-in is the method of returning the ball in association football when the whole ball passes over the touchline. It is governed by Law 15 of the Laws of the Game. In Scotland, it is known as a shy.

== Award ==
When the ball goes out of play past the touch-line to the side of the pitch, a throw-in is awarded to the opponents of the player who last touched the ball, whether deliberately or accidentally.

== Procedure ==
The throw-in is taken from the point where the ball crossed the touch-line, either on the ground or in the air, though typically a referee will tolerate small discrepancies between the position where the ball crossed the touch-line and the position of the throw-in. Opposing players may not approach closer than 2 m (2.2 yd) to the point on the touch-line from which the throw-in is to be taken.

When delivering the ball, the thrower must face the field of play. The thrower must have part of each foot on the touch-line or the ground outside the touch-line and use both hands to deliver the ball from behind and over the head.

The ball becomes in play as soon as it enters the field.

A goal cannot be scored directly from a throw-in; if a player throws the ball directly into their own goal without any other player touching it, the result is a corner kick to the opposing side. Likewise, an offensive goal cannot be scored directly from a throw-in; the result, in this case, is a goal kick for the defending team.

A player may not be penalised for an offside offence when receiving the ball directly from a throw-in. Skillful attackers can sometimes take advantage of this rule by getting behind the last defender(s) to receive the throw-in and having a clear path to the goal.

The optimal release angle for attaining maximum distance is about 30 degrees above the horizontal, according to researchers at Brunel University. According to the study, players can throw the ball with greater release velocity for lower angles.

== Offences ==
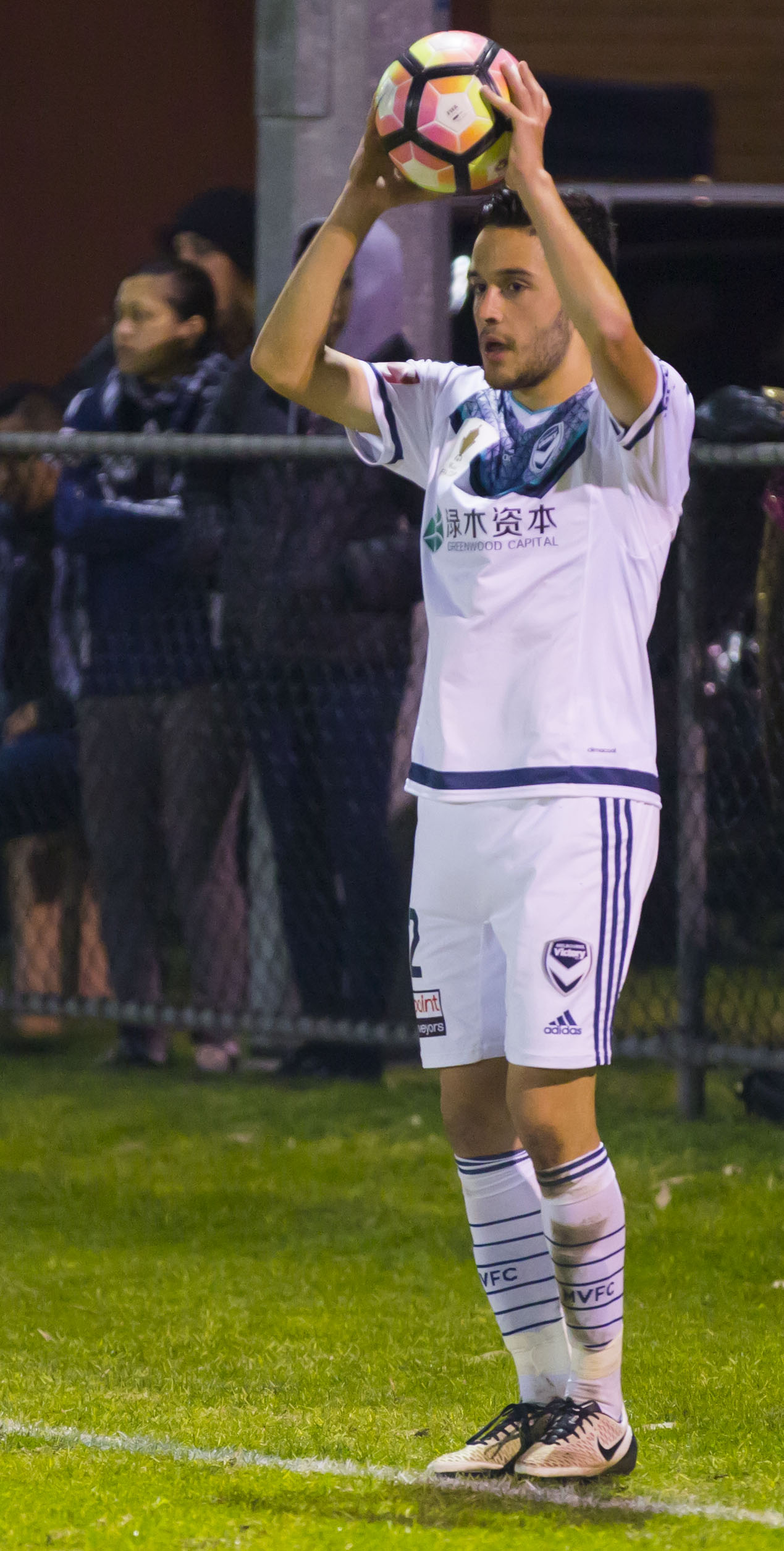
Stefan Nigro takes a throw-in for Melbourne Victory

Opposing players failing to respect the required distance (2 m) before the ball is in play, or otherwise unfairly distract or impede the thrower, may receive a caution (yellow card) for unsporting behaviour. If the throw-in has already been taken when the referee stops play for this offence, an indirect free kick is awarded.

If the thrower fails to deliver the ball per the required procedure or from a point other than where the ball left the field of play, the throw-in is awarded to the opposing team. This is commonly known as a "foul throw". However, if the ball touches the ground before entering the field (but it was taken correctly), the same team retakes the throw-in from the same position.

It is an infringement for the thrower to touch the ball a second time before another player has touched it; this is punishable by an indirect free kick to the opposing team from where the offence occurred, unless the second touch was also a more serious handling offence, in which case it is punishable by a direct free kick or penalty kick.

If a player appears to take a throw-in but suddenly leaves it to a teammate to take, the player may be cautioned for delaying the restart of play. Any player who excessively delays the restart of play may also be cautioned.

A goalkeeper cannot handle a ball thrown directly by a teammate. The keeper cannot circumvent this by using the feet before handling the ball. An indirect free kick is awarded if this infringement occurs within the goalkeeper's penalty area, and a direct free kick is awarded if the infringement occurs outside the goalkeeper's penalty area.

== History ==
=== Before 1863 ===
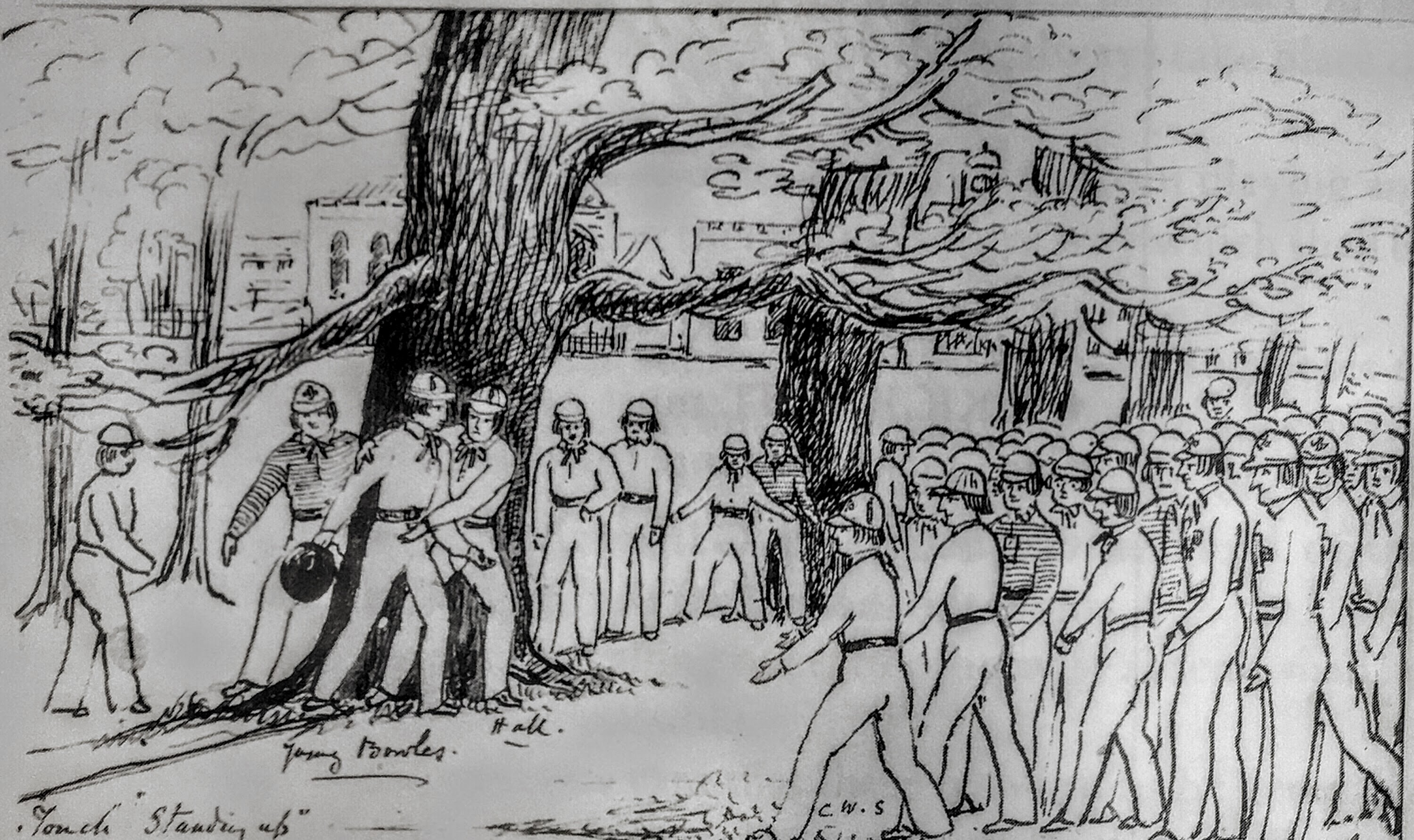
Illustration of the line-out used at Rugby School (1845)

A detailed description of an early predecessor of the throw-in is recorded in the novel Tom Brown's School Days, published in 1857 but based on the author's experiences at Rugby School from 1834 to 1842:

You see this gravel walk running down all along this side of the playing-ground, and the line of elms opposite on the other? Well, they're the bounds. As soon as the ball gets past them, it's in touch and out of play. And then whoever first touches it has to knock it straight out amongst the players-up, who make two lines with a space between them, every fellow going on his side ... He stands with the ball in his hand, while the two sides form in deep lines opposite one another: he must strike it straight out between them.

Several features of these passages are notable:

- possession is awarded to the first player to touch the ball after it goes out of play (this is the origin of the term "touch" for the area beyond the field of play)
- the ball must be played "straight out" (i.e. perpendicular to the touch-line)
- the player must "knock" or "strike" the ball back into play

The 1851 rules of Rugby School describe a similar procedure, except that the ball is thrown in rather than struck or hit; this is the ancestor of the line-out in rugby union:

A ball in touch is dead; consequently, the first player on his side must touch it down, bring it to the edge of touch, and throw it straight out.

Similar "throw-in" laws are found in the Cambridge rules of 1856, the Sheffield rules of 1858, the laws of Melbourne FC (1859), and indeed the original FA laws of 1863 (see below).

Other codes had a kick-in rather than a throw-in. These included the "Foot-Ball Club" of Edinburgh (1833), Harrow football (1858), Barnes FC (1862), Blackheath FC (1862), and the later Cambridge rules from November 1863. Some of these laws permitted the ball to be kicked in any direction, while others required that it be perpendicular to the touch-line. At Harrow, the ball could be kicked in by "any bystanders" or player.

The Eton field game's rules, as recorded in 1847, specified that a throw-in and a "bully" (scrummage) should be used alternately, while its 1857 rules used the bully exclusively.

=== The FA laws of 1863 ===
At its second meeting, on 10 November 1863, the Football Association agreed that "when the ball is out of bounds it should be kicked or thrown in straight by the person who should first touch it down." The first draft of the game's laws reflected this decision, but the option of a kick-in was removed before the final version of the laws was adopted on 8 December 1863.

This left the 1863 throw-in law very similar to those of Rugby School and Sheffield described earlier:

When the ball is in touch, the first player who touches it shall throw it from the point on the boundary line where it left the ground, in a direction at right angles with the boundary line.

The throw-in from the 1863 rules features several differences from the throw-in in modern association football:

- possession is awarded to the first player to touch the ball after it goes out of play (in the modern game, it is awarded against the team last touching the ball before it goes out of play)
- the ball must be thrown perpendicular to the touch-line (in the modern game, the ball may be thrown in any direction)
- the manner in which the ball is thrown is not specified (in the modern game, the ball must be thrown with two hands from above the head)

=== Subsequent developments ===
==== Unity with Sheffield rules ====
In 1867, the laws of the Sheffield Football Association awarded the throw-in against the team kicking the ball out of play. In 1868, these Sheffield rules were revised to award a kick-in instead of a throw-in. It continued to be awarded against the team that kicked the ball into touch and could now be played in any direction.

In 1873, Nottingham Forest F.C. proposed a change in the FA's throw-in law to make it more similar to the Sheffield rule: the throw-in would be awarded against the team who kicked out of play, and a kick-in could optionally replace it. The FA's meeting approved only part of the suggested change: the throw-in would be awarded against the team that kicked the ball out of play, but a kick-in could not replace it. It was still required to be thrown perpendicular to the touch-line.

At the FA meetings of 1875 and 1876, the Sheffield clubs attempted to introduce their kick-in into the FA's laws. Both times, the change was narrowly rejected after a heated debate. Matters came to a head in 1877. At the regular meeting of the FA, in February, the Sheffield Association again proposed its kick-in rule, while Clydesdale FC proposed a compromise rule which retained the throw-in but allowed it to go in any direction. The Sheffield Association agreed to withdraw its proposal in favour of Clydesdale FC's compromise. However, even this compromise proposal was rejected, "to the intense regret of those who desired one common code of rules." This rejection prompted the publication of a pseudonymous letter in The Sportsman decrying the "hasty, ill-judged decision ... bringing the Football Association into disrepute," and denying that it represented "the general body of [Football] Association players – even of those in London." A subsequent extraordinary general meeting of the FA was held on 17 April, at which the Clydesdale amendment was reconsidered and passed. As a result of this change in the FA laws, the Sheffield Association held a meeting one week later at which it agreed to abandon its own rules and accept the FA laws.

As a result of these developments, the throw-in of 1877 looked quite similar to today's: it was awarded against the team who kicked the ball out of play, and it could be thrown in any direction. There was no restriction on the technique by which the ball could be thrown; players would throw the ball great distances using only one arm. It is reported that the England international Norman Bailey could propel the ball "from the centre of the ground into the goal mouth."

==== Unity with Scotland ====
The International Football Conference of December 1882 addressed discrepancies between the laws used by the English, Scottish, Welsh and Irish football associations. One of the topics settled at this conference was the throw-in: in April 1882, at the proposal of the Third Lanark club, the Scottish FA had changed its rugby-style throw-in law (i.e. one-handed, perpendicular to the touchline) to the version in use today, i.e. thrown in any direction, but with two hands over the head; while the English laws, as described above, allowed the ball to be thrown with one hand in any direction. As a result of the conference, the Scottish version of the throw-in law was accepted. This new throw-in law, requiring the ball to be thrown from over the head with two hands, was formally adopted by the FA in 1883.

==== Scoring a goal from a throw-in ====
The game's laws have never permitted a goal to be scored directly from a throw-in by the attacking team. In 1882, a change in the laws, introduced by Nicholas Lane Jackson of Finchley FC and Morton Betts of Old Harrovians FC, made it possible to score an own goal directly from a throw-in. This possibility was removed in 1898.

In 2002, Aston Villa goalkeeper Peter Enckelman scored an own goal from a team-mate's throw-back to him when he misscontrolled the ball, but appeared to touch it slightly with his foot before it crossed the line, though Enkelman denied this. The incident received widespread media attention because it occurred in an important Birmingham derby match in the Premier League.

==== Offside from a throw-in ====
Under the original laws of 1863, it was not possible to be offside from a throw-in; however, since the ball was required to be thrown in at right angles to the touch-line, it would have been unusual for a player to gain significant advantage from being ahead of the ball. After the ball was permitted to be thrown in any direction in 1877, the following year (1878), a new law was introduced to allow a player offside from a throw-in. This situation lasted until 1920, when the law was altered to prevent a player from being offside from a throw-in.

==== Position of thrower's feet ====
In 1895, the thrower was required to "stand on the touch line." In 1896, it was clarified that the thrower could have "any part of both feet on the [touch] line." In 1925, this was changed to "both feet on the ground outside the touch-line," but in 1932 it reverted to "both feet on or outside the touch-line." In 1937, the requirement was again changed to "part of each foot shall be either on or outside the touchline." In 1960, the wording was further refined to "part of each foot shall be either on the touch-line or on the ground outside the touch-line."

==== Manner of throwing ====
In 1895, the player taking the throw-in was required to face the field of play. In 1965, the ball was required to be thrown from "behind and over" the head of the thrower.

==== Throw-In While Kneeling ====
Under Law 15 of the International Football Association Board (IFAB) Laws of the Game, a player must stand while taking a throw-in. The player must face the field of play, have part of each foot on the touchline or on the ground outside it, and deliver the ball using both hands from behind and over the head.

==== Position of opponents ====
Since 2005, opponents have been forbidden from approaching closer than 2 meters to the player taking the throw-in. This change was made because FIFA perceived "an increasing trend for an opponent to stand immediately in front of the thrower at a throw-in, with his feet virtually on the touch-line," with the result that "the thrower is being impeded from completing the throw-in." There was also a concern about the possibility of "a confrontational situation developing between both players."

==== Double touch ====
Since 1866, the player taking the throw-in has been forbidden to touch the ball again until another player has touched it.

==== Defunct requirements ====
In 1866, players were forbidden from playing the ball before it had touched the ground. This requirement was removed when the Clydesdale throw-in law was adopted in 1877.

In 1871, a law change introduced by Wanderers FC forbade players from playing the ball until it had travelled at least six yards. This requirement was dropped when the Scottish throw-in law was adopted in 1883.

==== Punishment for violations of the throw-in law ====
In 1882, an indirect free-kick was awarded for any violation of the throw-in law. In 1931, on a proposal by the Irish Football Association, this was changed to an award of the throw-in to the opposing team (except for a violation of the double-touch rule, which remained punishable by an indirect free-kick).

In 1966, it was specified that opponents who "dance about or gesticulate in a way calculated to distract or impede the thrower" should be cautioned for ungentlemanly conduct. In 1997, this wording was updated to punish with a yellow card an opponent who "unfairly distracts or impedes the thrower" for "unsporting behaviour." In 2016, the same punishment was applied to an opponent who approached closer than the minimum 2 metre distance; it was further specified that an indirect free-kick must be awarded if the ball was thrown in when the referee stops play to deal with the offence.

==== Name ====
The name "throw-in" is first found in the laws of 1891.

=== Summary ===
Date	Throw-in awarded to	Ball must be thrown in				Opponents may approach within 2 metres of thrower	Thrower may touch ball twice	Ball may be played before it		Goal may be scored from a throw-in		Player may be offside from a throw-in	Remedy for		Date
Date	Throw-in awarded to	at right angles to the touch-line	with two hands from above the head	from behind the head	with thrower facing the field of play	Opponents may approach within 2 metres of thrower	Thrower may touch ball twice	touches the ground	has travelled 6 yards	Attacking goal	Own goal	Player may be offside from a throw-in	foul throw	touching the ball twice	Date
1863	First player to touch the ball after it goes out of play	Yes	No	No	No	Yes	Yes	Yes	Yes	No	No	No	None	None	1863
1866	First player to touch the ball after it goes out of play	Yes	No	No	No	Yes	No	No	Yes	No	No	No	None	None	1866
1871	First player to touch the ball after it goes out of play	Yes	No	No	No	Yes	No	No	No	No	No	No	None	None	1871
1873	Opposite team to that which last touched the ball before it went out of play	Yes	No	No	No	Yes	No	No	No	No	No	No	None	None	1873
1877	Opposite team to that which last touched the ball before it went out of play	No	No	No	No	Yes	No	Yes	No	No	No	No	None	None	1877
1878	Opposite team to that which last touched the ball before it went out of play	No	No	No	No	Yes	No	Yes	No	No	No	Yes	None	None	1878
1882	Opposite team to that which last touched the ball before it went out of play	No	No	No	No	Yes	No	Yes	No	No	Yes	Yes	Indirect free-kick to opponents	Indirect free-kick to opponents	1882
1883	Opposite team to that which last touched the ball before it went out of play	No	Yes	No	No	Yes	No	Yes	Yes	No	Yes	Yes	Indirect free-kick to opponents	Indirect free-kick to opponents	1883
1895	Opposite team to that which last touched the ball before it went out of play	No	Yes	No	Yes	Yes	No	Yes	Yes	No	Yes	Yes	Indirect free-kick to opponents	Indirect free-kick to opponents	1895
1898	Opposite team to that which last touched the ball before it went out of play	No	Yes	No	Yes	Yes	No	Yes	Yes	No	No	Yes	Indirect free-kick to opponents	Indirect free-kick to opponents	1898
1920	Opposite team to that which last touched the ball before it went out of play	No	Yes	No	Yes	Yes	No	Yes	Yes	No	No	No	Indirect free-kick to opponents	Indirect free-kick to opponents	1920
1931	Opposite team to that which last touched the ball before it went out of play	No	Yes	No	Yes	Yes	No	Yes	Yes	No	No	No	Throw-in to opponents	Indirect free-kick to opponents	1931
1965	Opposite team to that which last touched the ball before it went out of play	No	Yes	Yes	Yes	Yes	No	Yes	Yes	No	No	No	Throw-in to opponents	Indirect free-kick to opponents	1965
2005	Opposite team to that which last touched the ball before it went out of play	No	Yes	Yes	Yes	No	No	Yes	Yes	No	No	No	Throw-in to opponents	Indirect free-kick to opponents	2005

== Unusual throw-ins ==
=== Long throws ===
Rory Delap was highlighted for his throw-in technique: a former schoolboy javelin champion, Delap was renowned for having one of the longest and most powerful throw-ins in football, sending the ball into the six-yard box from distances up to 50 yd (46 m). In the English Football League, some teams with a long-throw specialist provided towels at home matches to allow the ball to be dried to improve accuracy; the EFL banned this with effect from the 2023–24 season to cut timewasting and improve ball-in-play statistics; the concurrent adoption of the multiball system should ensure a dry ball is available regardless. Wrexham A.F.C.'s Ben Tozer was also noted for his Delap-inspired long throws.

=== Flip throws ===
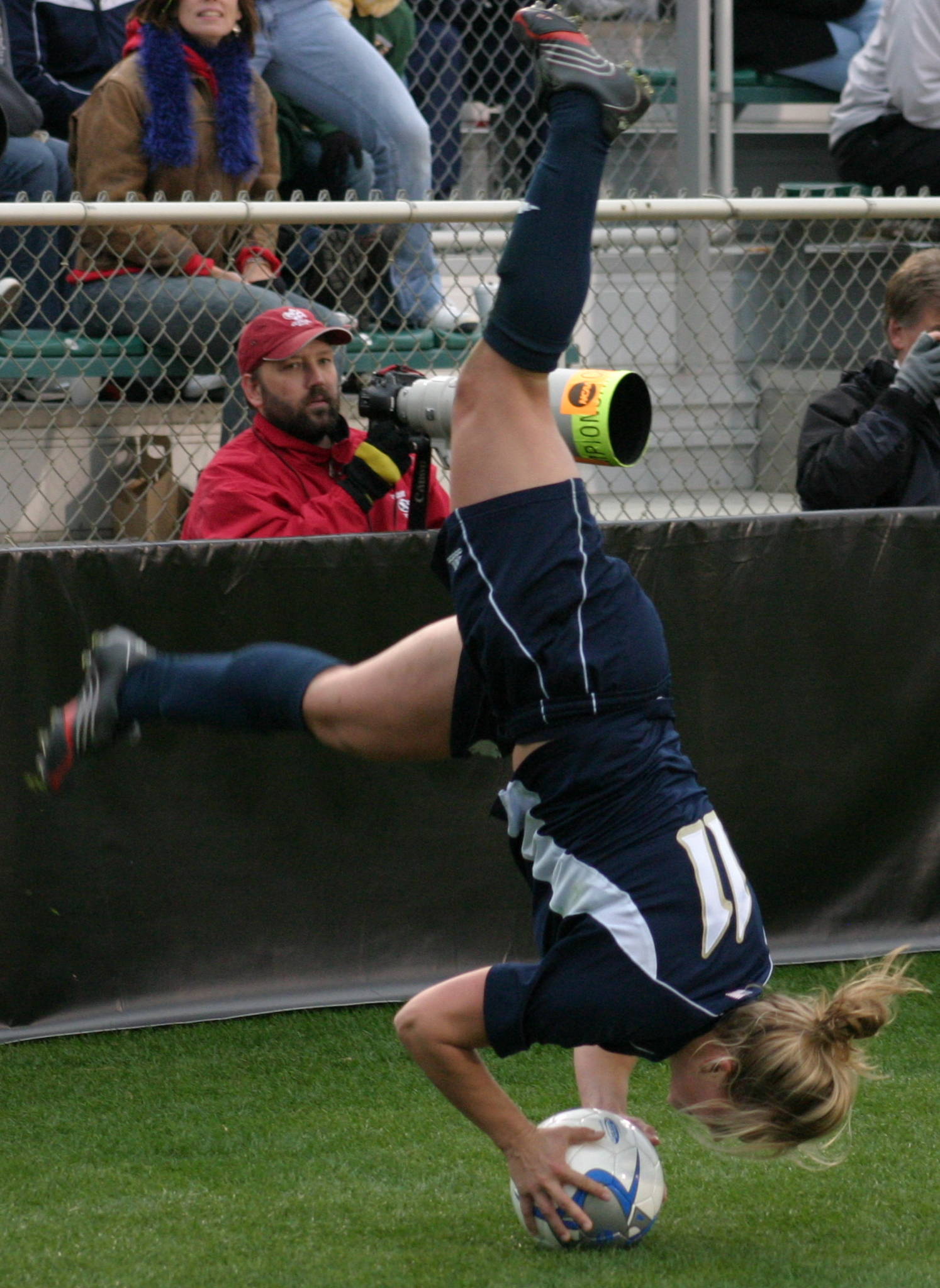
Michele Weissenhofer, a forward for Notre Dame Fighting Irish women's soccer player attempting a flip throw

An uncommon but effective technique for delivering a faster than usual throw is the flip throw (notably employed in recent years by, among others, Estonian player Risto Kallaste, and Icelander Steinþór Freyr Þorsteinsson): in it the player, during the run-up, plants the ball on the ground, flips over it and uses the momentum gained from the flip to increase the velocity of the ball. American flip thrower Michael Lewis set a new Guinness World Record when he recorded a throw-in of 59.817 m (65.417 yd) in Frisco, Texas, in April 2019. British footballers Dave Challinor and Andy Legg are among the previous record holders. Iranian defender Milad Mohammadi made a failed attempt at a flip throw in the group-stage match against Spain at the 2018 FIFA World Cup; two years later, compatriot Nader Mohammadi scored using the technique in a domestic match (the goalkeeper touched the ball on its way in).

Invention of the manoeuvre has been credited to Tony Hyndman, son of coach Schellas Hyndman, who had learned tumbling from his gymnast mother.
