= Multiball =

Multiball may refer to:

- Multiball system, a method in association football where an assistant supplies another football when the original ball has gone out of play
- A situation in pinball where several balls are in play at the same time
- A training method in table tennis where balls are continuously fed to the player, either by another player or a ball robot
