= Eton wall game =

Game that originated at Eton College, England

Coordinates: 51.4932°N 0.6078°W

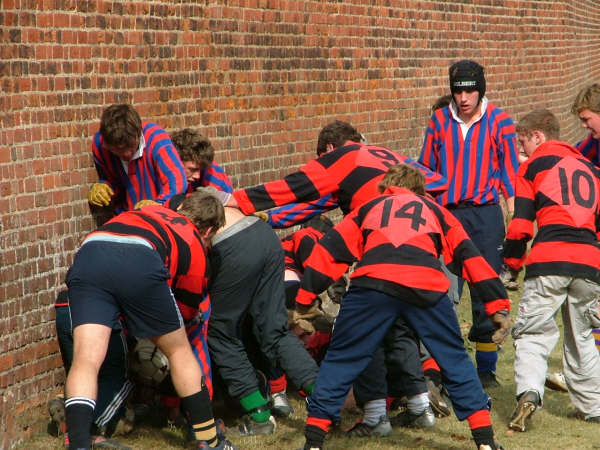
- Intra-school Eton wall game in progress
- First played: 1766; 260 years ago
- Clubs: Eton College

Characteristics
- Contact: Yes
- Type: Football ball
- Venue: Eton College field

Presence
- Country or region: England
- Olympic: No
- World Championships: No
- Paralympic: No
- World Games: No

The Eton wall game is a game that originated at and is still played at Eton College. It is played on a strip of ground 5 metres wide and 110 metres long ("The Furrow") next to a slightly curved brick wall ("The Wall") erected in 1717. It is one of two unique forms of football played at Eton, the other being the Eton field game.

The traditional and most important match of the year is played on Saint Andrew's Day, as the Collegers (King's Scholars) take on the Oppidans (the rest of the school). Although College has only 70 boys to pick from, compared to the 1250 or so Oppidans, the Collegers have one distinct advantage: access to the field on which the wall game is played is controlled by a Colleger. Despite this, it is usual for them to allow the Oppidans to use it whenever they wish.

At the annual St Andrew's Day match, the Oppidans climb over the wall, after throwing their caps over in defiance of the Scholars, while the Collegers march down from the far end of College Field, arm-in-arm, towards the near end, where they meet the Oppidans.

The wall game is also played on Ascension Day, immediately after a 6 a.m. service on the roof of College Chapel. Various scratch matches are also played throughout the Michaelmas and Lent halves (terms), where boys from different year groups, as well as former pupils and masters, take part.

== History ==
The wall against which the game is played was constructed in 1717. On the other side of the wall is the Slough Road. According to an 1868 article, the Wall Game "used formerly to be played in [a playing area with a width of] twenty yards, with the field rules in use, only with the exception that the ball used frequently to be held against the wall, and the goals were, at one end a door, at the other a tree. However, the distance from the wall where 'the [boundary] line' was made became 'fine by degrees and beautifully less,' and it is now only six yards from the wall".

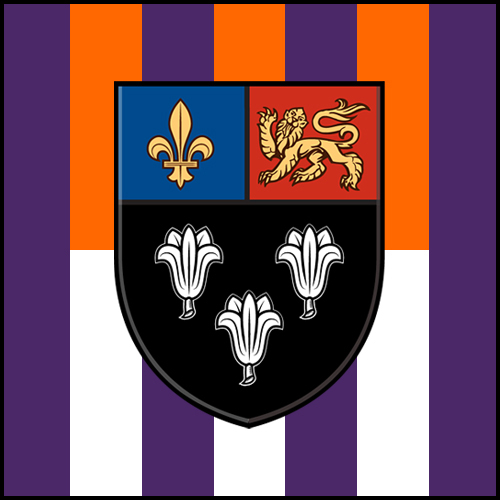
Coat of arms of Eton College, where the game was developed. The background represents the wall game: the College X's purple and the Oppidan X's orange.

A possible early reference to the wall game occurs in the anonymously-published reminiscences of Henry John Blake (born 1791). Blake reports that he was "going away with the ball in style towards the goal, a large tree" when he was fouled by an opponent.

Between 1811 and 1822, "football was almost confined to the Wall game, and at most forty players, mostly constant", although there were also "occasional trifling games in the open [i.e., the Field game], rare in interval and rare in players".

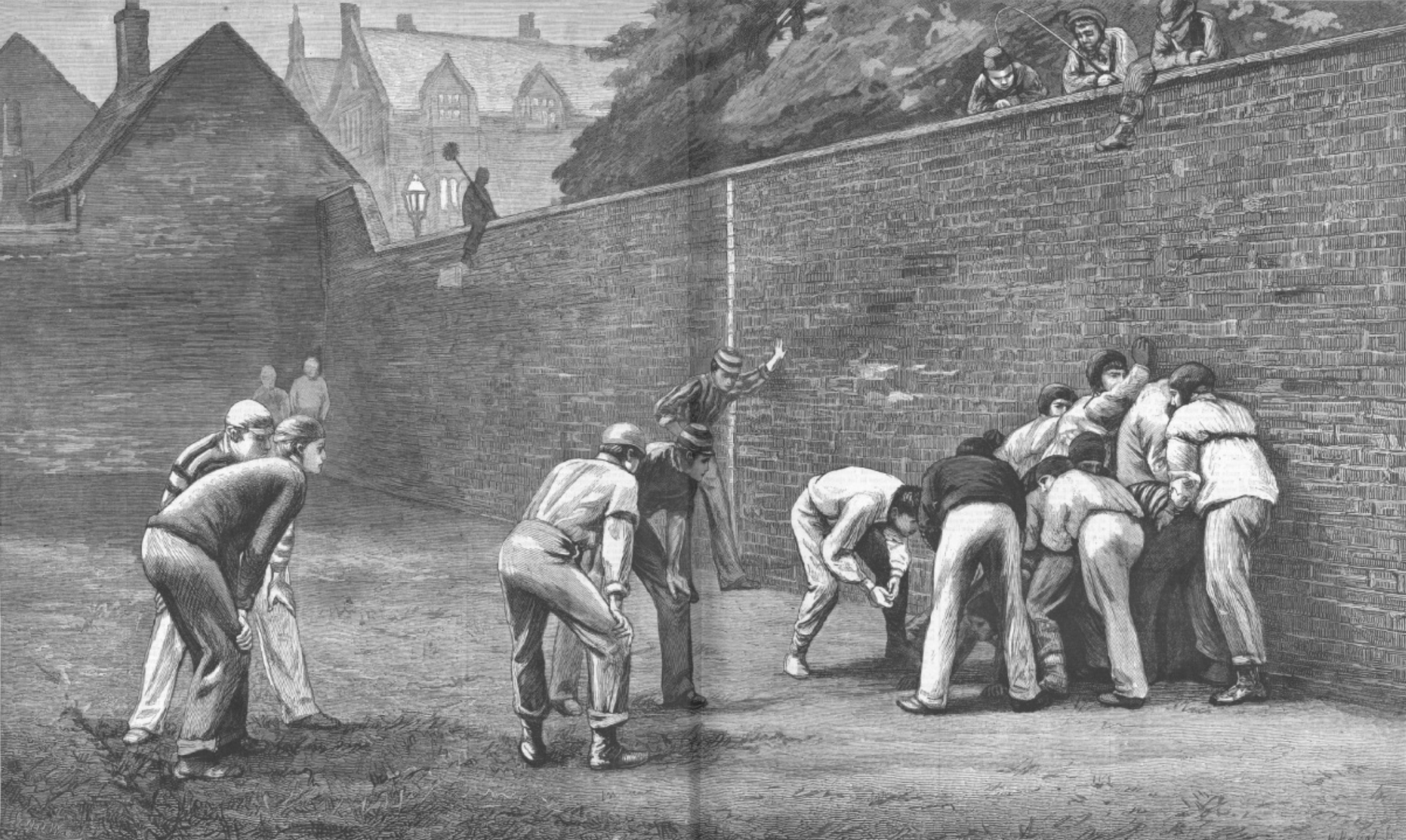
A bully just outside good calx (1876)

A letter from March 1821 states "there is a wall ... against which they play Foot-ball in the season; indeed they say it is capital weather for it now, but it is not the fashionable game, so nobody dares to propose it."

The Collegers v. Oppidans match was banned in 1827 for ten years after a fight broke out during the game. It had resumed by 1836.

An article on "Eton games" in the 19 November 1832 issue of the Eton College magazine includes a detailed description of the wall game (called simply "Foot-ball"). It notes that the game was already played "in a space not more than five or six yards wide". The 29 November 1840 issue of Bell's Life in London features a description of "the annual match ... between Collegers and Oppidans" played on 24 November 1840: the Collegers won by seven "shies", with no goal being scored by either side. The article adds that this was "the first time since 1836 that the Oppidans have been beaten".

The rules of the Wall Game were first written down in 1849. They were subsequently revised in 1862, 1871, and 1953. Eton College archives possess copies of the rules from 1885 and 1933. The 16th revision of the rules was made in 2001.

== Scoring ==
The aim of the game is to move the ball towards the opponents' end of the playing area. In those last few yards of the field is an area called the "calx" (Latin for "chalk"). In this area a player can earn a "shy" (worth one point) by lifting the ball against the wall with his foot. A teammate then touches the ball with his hand and shouts "Got it!" These two plays must happen within the calx. After this, if the umpire says "Given", the scoring team can attempt a goal (worth a further nine points, making 10 in all) by throwing the ball at a designated target (a garden door at one end of the field and a tree at the other end). A player can also score a kicked goal, worth five points, if he kicks the ball out and it hits a goal during the normal course of play.

== Play ==
Gameplay footage from the 1921 match

The main game consists of the two sets of players forming a rugby-style scrummage (called a "Bully") in which neither team may "furk" the ball, which is to hook it backwards (except in Calx, where a different type of Bully called a Calx Bully occurs). The Bully is formed next to the Wall and crabs slowly along the Wall until the ball emerges. Many players, particularly those whose position is actually against the Wall, lose the skin off their elbows, hips and knees. Because of this, players usually wear long sleeves. Players within the Bully shove and push each other, mostly with their bodies but also by placing their fists against the faces of the opposition and attempting to lever them backwards and away from the Wall. Actual punching is not permitted, and grabbing an opponent's shirt ("holding") is also not allowed.

The fastest way to make ground is by kicking the ball upfield and out of play whenever it comes sideways out of the Bully; unlike most types of football, play is restarted opposite where the ball stops after it had gone out, or was touched after it had gone out.

Consequently, the most common tactic revolves around the formation of a 'phalanx'. This consists of a tunnel (coming out from the wall, diagonally forward from the position of the ball) of players from one team who are crouching on hands and feet next to each other. Once the team in possession of the ball has formed a successful phalanx, it attempts to pass the ball down the 'tunnel' using the knees of the players forming it, to a player standing at the end of the phalanx (i.e. furthest away from the Wall), known as Lines, whose job it is to kick the ball upfield. The team not in possession is constantly attempting to disrupt this, and win the ball back.

The game lasts up to 55 minutes, with two halves of 25 minutes each and an additional 5 minutes as half-time break. Many games end 0-0. Goals (worth ten points) are very rare; they occur about once every couple of years. No goals have been scored in the St Andrew's Day game since 1909. However, shies (worth 1 point) are scored more frequently.

== Positions ==
Each team has ten players (hence the abbreviation "X") and two substitutes:

- Second: Player on the Ball
- Second: Player on the Ball
- Third: Player supporting Player on the Ball
- Fourth: Player outside Third
- First Wall: Standing player stopping progress of opposition Second
- Second Wall: Standing player preventing opposition First Wall from disrupting his First Wall’s actions
- Third Wall: Supports Second Wall
- Lines: Calls offences and kicks ball when loose
- Fly: Organises bully's actions and tells team where the ball is
- Long: Stands many yards behind the bully, to stop the ball if it gets past his bully, like a Goalkeeper in Association Football.
- Blood Sub: Comes on if any of his team bleeds
- 12th Man: Other sub who may only be used in case of injuries. Takes notes on the match for the archives.

== Organisation ==
The Wall Game is organised entirely by boys, particularly by the Keepers (captains) of College Wall, Oppidan Wall and Mixed Wall. Famous past players of the Wall Game include Prince Harry who played for the Oppidans, Boris Johnson (Keeper of the College Wall), George Orwell and Harold Macmillan. The First World War flying ace Arthur Rhys Davids also played, representing College with Ralph Dominic Gamble in 1915.

There are organised sessions on Tuesdays and Thursdays in the Lent half, by the Master in Charge.

Members of the College Wall also annually commemorate the outstanding player and Keeper of the Wall Logie Leggatt, who was killed in the First World War at the age of 22, making a toast at each year's Christmas Sock Supper with the words in piam memoriam L.C.L (in affectionate memory of L.C.L). Despite its renown outside the school, only a very small number of the 250 or so boys in each year group ever take part in the sport, unlike the lesser-known but much more widely played Eton field game.

The Eton Wall Game has been played twice by all-female teams, including in 2005.

== Historical results ==
- 1927: 0-0
- 1951: 0-0
- 1954: 0-0
- 1955: Collegers 1-0 Oppidans
- 2017: 0-0
- 2018: 0-0
- 2019: Not played (Covid-19 Pandemic)
- 2020: Not played (Covid-19 Pandemic)
- 2021: 0-0
- 2022: Collegers 1-0 Oppidans
- 2024: Collegers 1-0 Oppidans
- 2025: Collegers 0-4 Oppidans

== In popular culture ==
The game was first televised by the BBC in 1948.

The sitcom Green Wing features a fictional game, Guyball (/ˈɡiːbɔːl/), which parodies the obscurity of public school pastimes such as the Eton wall game. It is introduced by Guy Secretan, who learned the sport at the fictional school Whiteleaf (/ˈhwɪtlɪf/). The object of the game is to throw balls in a "Topmiler", a wicker basket on top of a leather flying helmet. However, the rules of Guyball are never fully explained and are designed to be as confusing and as difficult to understand as possible. Fans of the show have however created their own rules, and the game was occasionally played 'for real'.

In Terry Pratchett's Discworld series, the Ankh-Morpork Assassins' Guild has a far more sadistic variant of the "Wall Game", and is essentially an extreme hybrid of rock-climbing and dodgeball.

In the first of Charlie Higson's Young Bond novels, SilverFin, the young James Bond comes to Eton and learns the rules of the Wall Game.

The game was a subject of the 1987 book, The Sports Hall of Shame, by Bruce Nash and Allan Zullo.

The game is mentioned in the novels The Bancroft Strategy, The Cobra, The IPCRESS File, and Burma Sahib. The television programme Taskmaster discussed the Wall Game as the epitome of "snootiness".

== See also ==
- English public school football games

== Bibliography ==
- "The Wall Game". Saturday Review. 56 (1466): 695–697. 1 December 1883.
  - Reprinted in A New Book of Sports. London: Richard Bentley and Son. 1885. pp. 62–71.
- Alcock, Charles W. (n.d.) [1874]. Football: Our Winter Game. London: Field Office. pp. 31–36.
- Clutton-Brock, A. (1900). Eton. London: George Bell and Sons. pp. 224–235.
- James, Sydney R. (1892). "Eton Football: the 'Wall' Game". In Marshall, Frank (ed.). Football: the Rugby Union Game. London: Cassell & Company. pp. 23–31.
- Macnaghten, R. E. (February 1898). "The Eton Wall-Game". Badminton Magazine of Sports and Pastimes. vi (xxxi). London: Longmans, Green, and Co.: 171–183.
  - Reprinted with some alterations in Shearman, Montague (1899). Football: History. London: Longmans, Green, and Co. pp. 49–63. hdl:2027/chi.19338017.
- C. H. M. (1905). Recollections of an Eton Colleger. Eton: Spottiswode and Co. pp. 109–140.
- Parker, Eric (1914). Eton in the 'Eighties. London: Smith, Elder, & Co. pp. 114–152.
