= Voga Wallace =

American college soccer player

Voga Wallace (1962–2000) was an American college soccer player at the University of Virginia known for his somersault technique when taking a throw-in.
