= Cordner–Eggleston Cup =

School football trophy in Australia

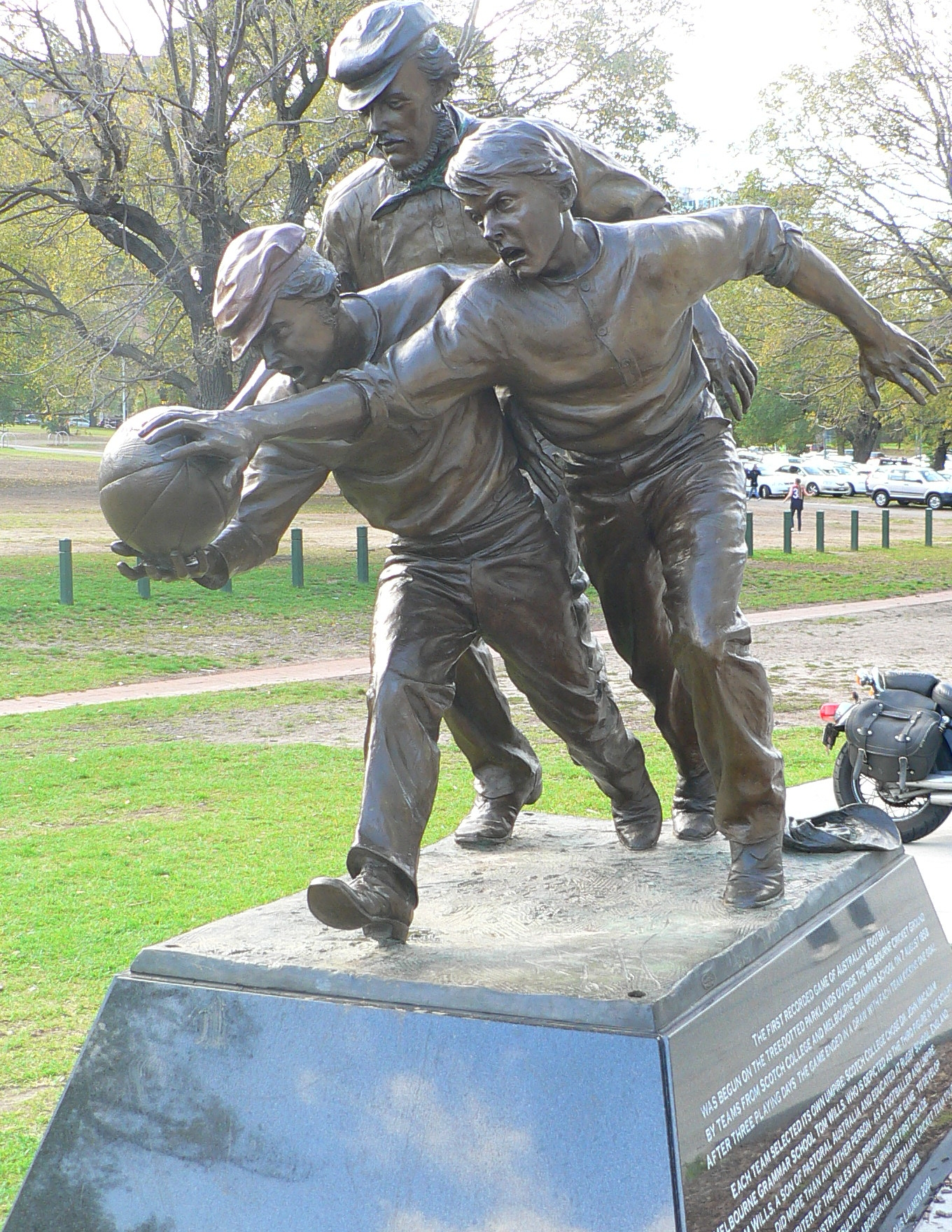
Statue at the Melbourne Cricket Ground of Tom Wills umpiring the earliest known football match between Scotch College and Melbourne Grammar

The Cordner–Eggleston Cup is a retrospective award commemorating the historic school football rivalry between Melbourne Grammar School and the Scotch College which has been contested since 1858. Competition between these schools is believed to have been pivotal in the establishment of Australian rules football.

The cup, instituted in 1989 was named after prominent alumni from the respective schools – Dr Don Cordner (Melbourne Grammar) and Mr Michael Eggleston (Scotch College). Prior to the award, the two schools competed for honours and were recorded in the yearbooks and other sports logbooks of the respective schools. Other prominent schools at times also competed in the prestigious tournaments since the 1860s, including Geelong Grammar School.

The first football fixture was played under experimental rules on 7 August 1858 at Yarra Park giving the Cup a claim to being the longest continuously running football competition in the world. It is also of cultural importance to Australia, as it is the best documented early football match in Australia and is believed by many historians to have played a key role in the Origins of Australian football. The first match is commemorated by a bronze statue depicting the game outside the Melbourne Cricket Ground (MCG).

The 150th anniversary of the cup was celebrated by the match being played at the MCG, where most notable football matches are played, including the Grand Final of the Australian Football League, the senior competition of Australian Rules.

== The "first" match ==
In the tradition of English Rugby School football, the first game was the best of three goals and ran for three days, over three consecutive Saturdays, and each team selected an umpire: Melbourne Grammar chose Tom Wills; Scotch chose Dr John Macadam. The teams were 40-a-side and used a rugby ball. By the completion of the third day, the match was ended in a 1–1 draw.

In recent years historians have found evidence of earlier matches between the two schools, and subsequently the origin of the game remains one of the most contested areas of Australian history. Both Melbourne Grammar and Scotch have acknowledged the ongoing research of historians.

== The Cup ==
The cup, instituted in 1989, is a retrospective award which was named after prominent alumni from the respective schools – Dr Don Cordner (Melbourne Grammar) and Mr Michael Eggleston (Scotch College). Before the cup the clubs competed for honours and were recorded in the yearbooks and other sports logbooks of the respective schools.

== Relationship with Australian football ==
Australian football is the code which the match is played today, however the first match was played under experimental rules.

The AFL Commission officially regards it as the first match of Australian football.

Historians draw a connection to the modern code of Australian football primarily through the involvement of Tom Wills as an organiser and participant as well as the fact that the match was co-ordinated by Thomas H. Smith who was later, along with Wills, one of the founders of the Melbourne Football Club and signatory of the first known Laws of Australian Football. Wills is believed to have been involved due to his interest in establishing football in Victoria and experimenting with rules as part of his quest for a "code of laws" by which the game could be organised.

History has been uncovered which, in fact, suggests that Melbourne Grammar School played football against both St. Kilda Grammar School and a number of men from St. Kilda in June and July 1858. It was not until August that the two recognised schools met to play the "first" recorded match.

Tim Shearer of the Old Scotch Collegians Association, and a former AFL umpire, explained to The Age that the College is "careful to say we don't dogmatically claim this was the first game of Australian football and that there are differing views which we respect. But we do like to say that this is the first recorded game by two teams who still exist today."

To celebrate the schools' 150-year-old rivalry, the Cordner–Eggleston Cup in 2008 was played at the Melbourne Cricket Ground; the match was won by Melbourne Grammar.

== Outcome history ==
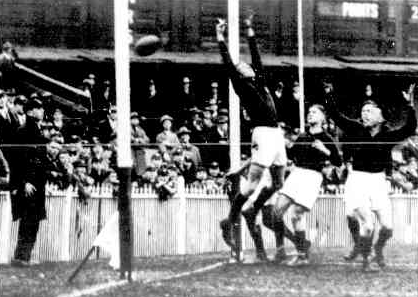
Scotch College vs Melbourne Grammar at Melbourne Cricket Ground 1929

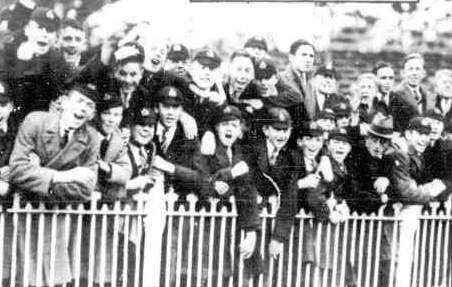
Melbourne Grammar supporters football team supporters in 1929

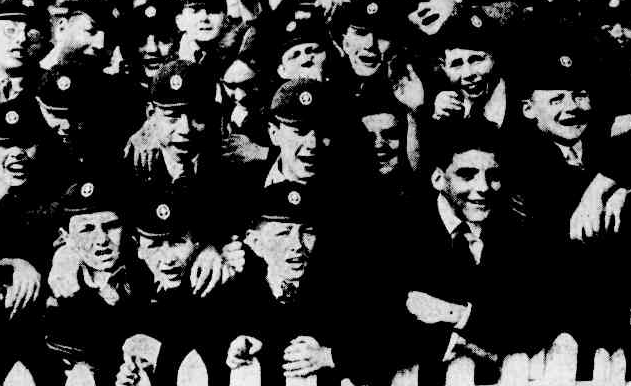
Scotch College students cheering on their football team in 1930

Year Played	Location	Winner
1858	Richmond Paddock	1:1 Draw
1859	Richmond Paddock	Scotch College 2 to 0
1860		0:0 Draw
1869	Melbourne	Melbourne Grammar School 2 to 1
1870	Richmond Paddock	Melbourne Grammar School (0) def. by Scotch College (2)
1909	Melbourne Cricket Ground	Scotch College
1923	Melbourne Cricket Ground	Melbourne Grammar School
1924	Melbourne Cricket Ground	Melbourne Grammar School 10–15–75 to 5–6–36
1925	Melbourne Cricket Ground	Melbourne Grammar School 96 to 6–15
1926	Junction Oval	Melbourne Grammar School 14-14 to 12–8
1929	Melbourne Cricket Ground	Melbourne Grammar School 10–15–71 to 7–8–50
1930	Melbourne Cricket Ground	Melbourne Grammar School 8–11-59 to 7–15-57
1931	Melbourne Cricket Ground	Melbourne Grammar School 8–11 to 7–4
1933	Melbourne Cricket Ground	Melbourne Grammar School 9–5-59 to 6–19-55
1934	Olympic Park	Melbourne Grammar School 12–12 to 9–6
1935	Olympic Park	Melbourne Grammar School 14–20 to 13–14
1936	Olympic Park	Melbourne Grammar School 10–15 to 9–14
1938	Melbourne Cricket Ground	Melbourne Grammar School 11–17 to 10–18
1939	Scotch College	Scotch College 17–11 to 15–13
1941	Scotch College	Melbourne Grammar 14-16 to 8–14
1942	Grimwade House	Scotch College 20–15 to 12–12
1943	Scotch College	Scotch College 15-17 to 12–16
1944	Melbourne Grammar	Melbourne Grammar 11-24 to 12–10
1946	?	Melbourne Grammar 12-8 to 9–15
1949	?	Melbourne Grammar 16.8 to 7.6
1950	MCG	Melbourne Grammar 14.4 to 8.12
1951	Scotch College	Melbourne Grammar 9.7 to 6.11
1952	MCG	Scotch College 11.11 to 7.11
1953	Scotch College	Scotch College 12.8 to 10.8
1954	Junction Oval	Scotch College 10.8 to 7.7
1995	Scotch College	Scotch College
1996	?	Scotch College
1997	Scotch College	Scotch College
1998	Melbourne Grammar School	Scotch College
1999	?	Scotch College
2000	?	Scotch College
2001	MCG	Scotch College
2002	?	Scotch College
2003	MCG	Scotch College
2004	Melbourne Grammar School	Melbourne Grammar School
2005	Scotch College	Scotch College
2006	MGS Edwin Flack Park	Scotch College
2007	Scotch College	Scotch College
2008	MCG	Melbourne Grammar School
2009	Scotch College	Scotch College
2010	MGS Edwin Flack Park	Melbourne Grammar School
2011	Scotch College	Scotch College
2012	MGS Edwin Flack Park	Scotch College
2013	Scotch College	Melbourne Grammar School
2014	MGS Edwin Flack Park	Melbourne Grammar School
2015	Scotch College	Melbourne Grammar School
2016	MGS Edwin Flack Park	Scotch College 96 to 71
2017	Scotch College	Scotch College 12–11–83 to 4–5–29
2018	MGS Edwin Flack Park	Melbourne Grammar School
2019	Scotch College	Scotch College 9–3–57 to 6–7–43
2020 & 2021	-	No Match (COVID-19 pandemic)
2022	Scotch College	Scotch College by 10 points
2023	MGS Edwin Flack Park	Scotch College 116 to 25
2024	Scotch College	Melbourne Grammar School 12-3-75 to 9-19-73
2025	MGS Edwin Flack Park	Scotch College 10.9.69 to 9.6.60
2026	Scotch College	Scotch College 11.10.76 to 8.10.58
