= Ball boy =

Individual who retrieves and supply balls for players or officials in some sports

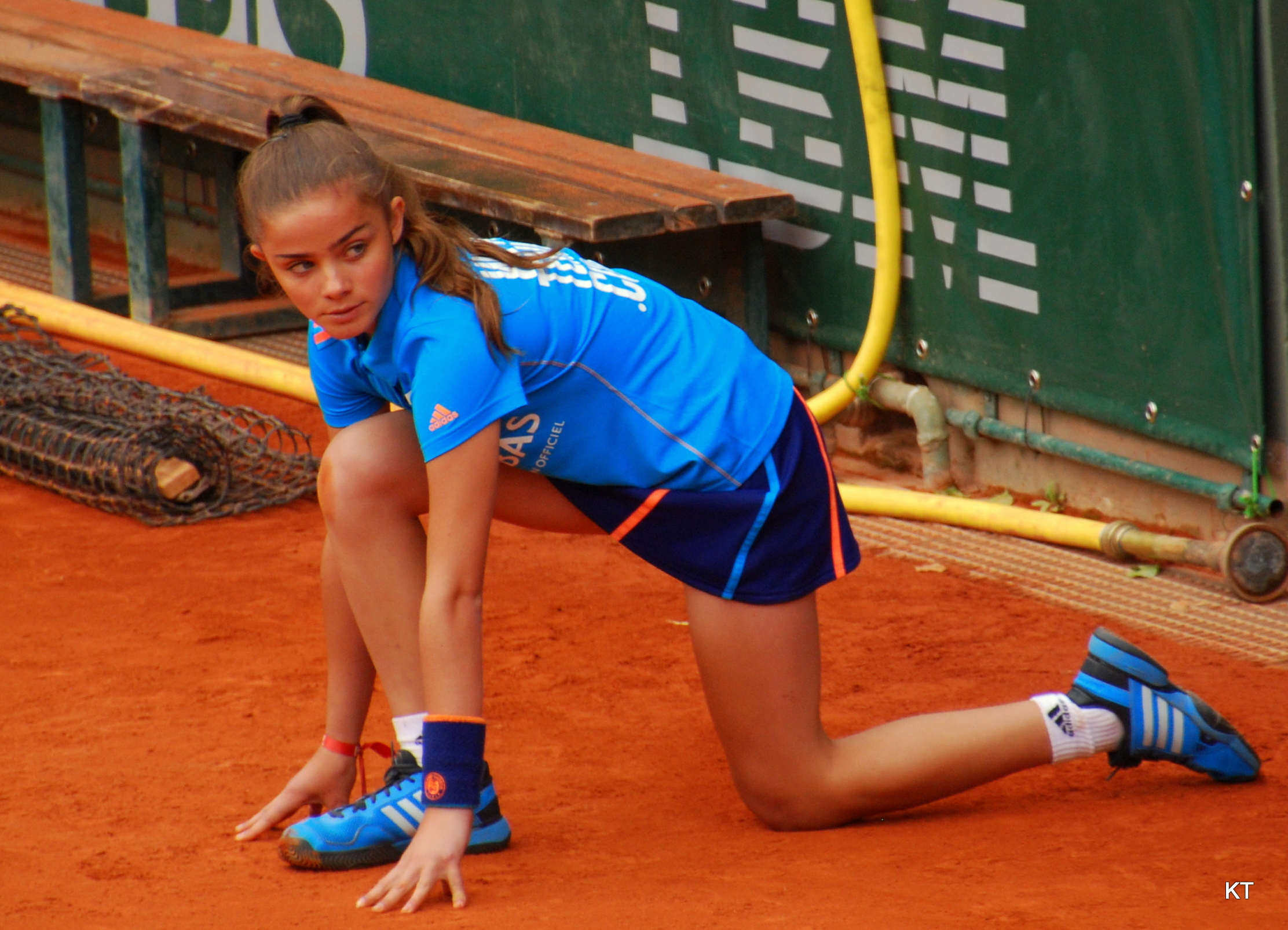
A ball girl at the 2014 French Open in tennis

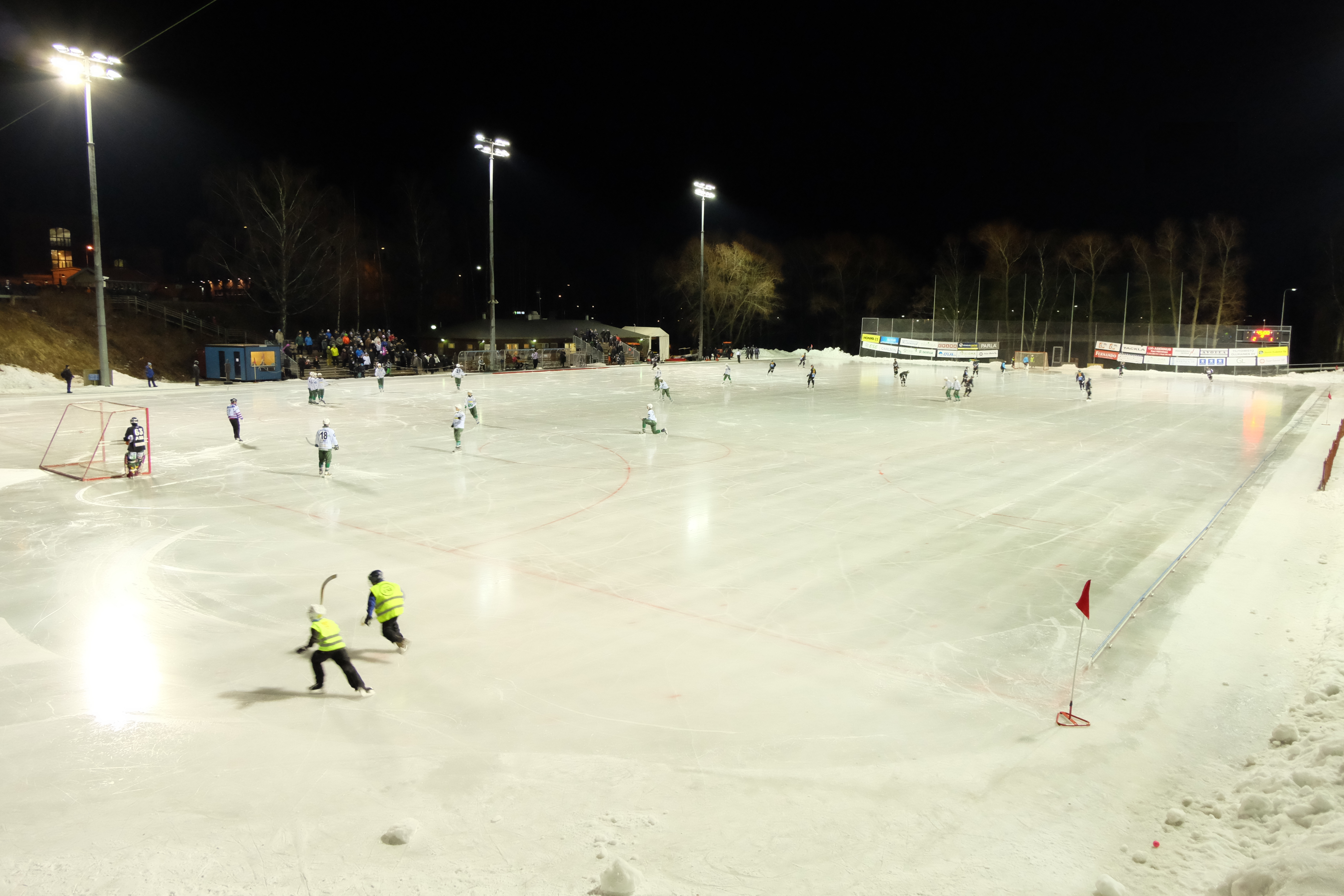
The skaters in yellow vests in the foreground are ball boys at this bandy game.

Ball boys and ball girls, also known as ball kids or collectively as the ball crew, are individuals, usually youths, who retrieve and supply balls for players or officials in various ball sports. Though non-essential, their activities help to speed up play by reducing the amount of inactive time.

== Tennis ==
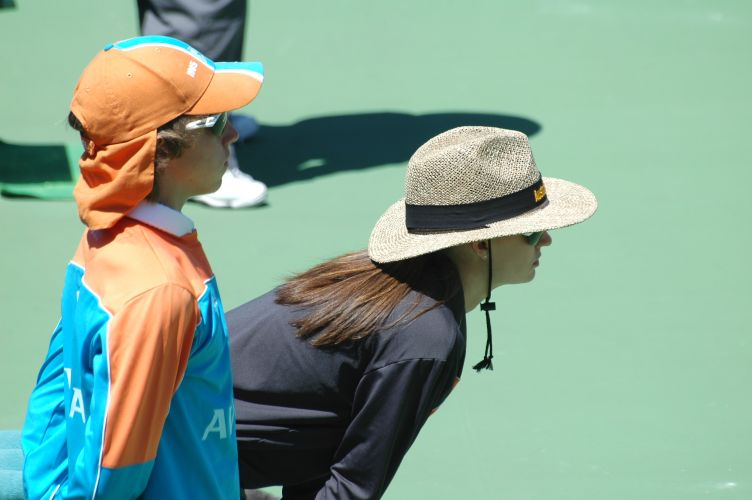
Ball boy (left) and line judge (right) during the 2005 Australian Open

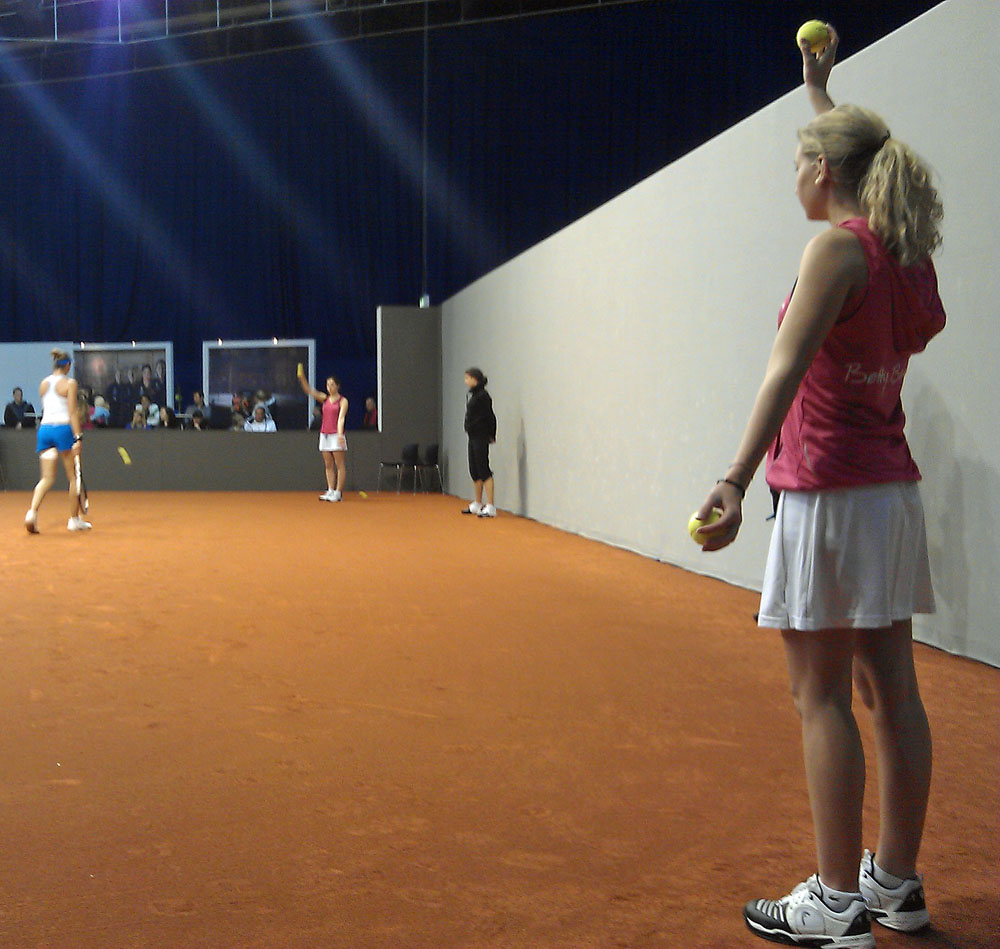
Two ball girls in pose offering balls to the player

Quick retrieval of loose balls and delivery of the game balls to the servers are necessary for quick play in tennis. In professional tournaments, every court will have a trained squad of ball boys/girls with positionings and movements designed for maximum efficiency, while also not interfering with active play. As well as dealing with the game balls, ball boys/girls may also provide the players with other assistance, such as the delivery of towels and drinks.

=== Positions ===
- Nets are located on either side of the net to retrieve balls that are trapped by the net. Their job is to gather dead balls from the court and feed them to the bases after a point. This is usually done by rolling them alongside the court.
- Bases are located just off each corner (at either end of the baseline at either end of the court). Their job is to retrieve balls from the nets or dead balls along the baseline and then feed balls to the server, or, if the server is down the opposite end of the court, roll them back to the nets who will then in turn roll them to the base on the server's end of the court.

=== Feeding ===
Feeding is how the ball boys and girls give the balls to the players. At different tournaments, they use different techniques for feeding. At some tournaments, bases have both arms in the air, feeding the balls with one arm; at others, they have one arm in the air which they feed the balls and the other arm behind their back or held out in front of them. When feeding the ball, they must also be aware of a player's preference. Most players accept the standard, which is for the ball boy or girl to gently toss the ball (from the position with their arms extended upwards) such that it bounces one time then to the proper height for the player to catch the ball easily.

=== Hiring ===
There are various methods for selecting the ball boys and girls for a tournament. In many tournaments, such as Wimbledon and the Queen's Club Championships, they are picked from or apply through schools, where they are selected by tournaments, and they have to go through a number of selections and tests. In some other tournaments, such as the Nottingham Open, Australian Open and the US Open, positions are advertised and there are open try-outs.

Applicants are required to pass a physical ability assessment. In addition to fitness and stamina, the abilities to concentrate and remain alert are essential.

== Rugby codes football ==
In first class rugby matches, to reduce delays caused by use of having only a single football on hand, the concept of having on immediate call at the touchline one or two reserve footballs with the complimentary adoption of ball boys (also later later ball girls) was introduced, with the first documented instances occurring at major rugby union and rugby league contests in Sydney and Brisbane in Australia in the inter-war era.

== Association football ==
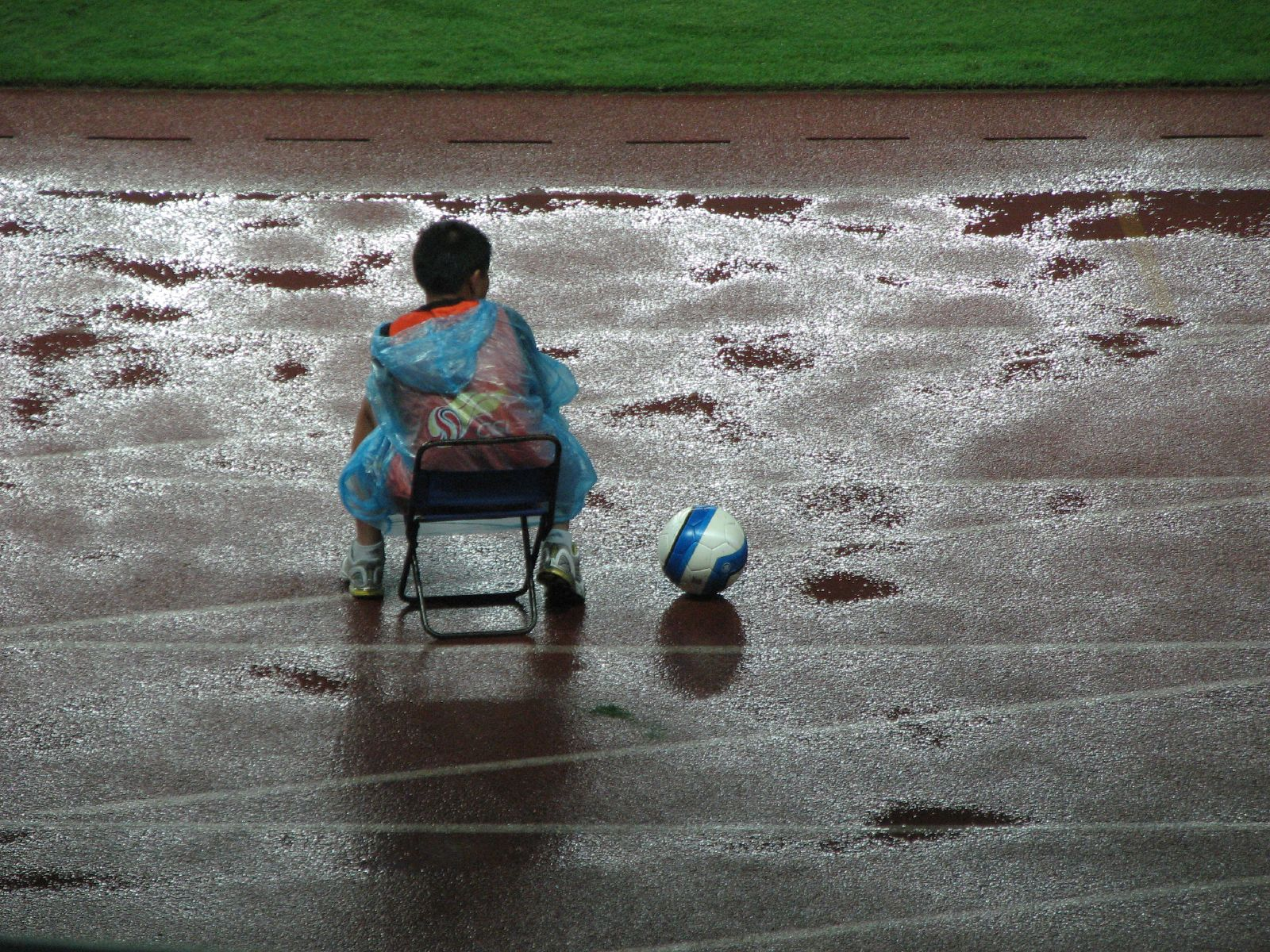
A ball boy at a football match in China in 2007

In 2006, the IFAB Laws of the Game of association football were changed to allow multiple balls to be used under the direction of a referee. Higher level organised matches now commonly use 6+ balls with ball boys scattered around the pitch to quicken the pace of play. Typically positioned behind advertising boards surrounding the pitch, ball boys will try to be in possession of a spare ball at all times, so that this can be given to the players prior to the loose ball being retrieved. Balls may also be stored on cones near sidelines, so that they are readily available for restarts, and to prevent ball boys from accelerating returns to home players, and delaying returns to away players.

Methods for selecting ball boys vary between grounds. On occasion, away teams have complained about perceived favour of ball boys towards home sides.

In a 2013 EFL Cup match Eden Hazard, a member of the away team, which was trailing at the time, got into an altercation with an apparently time-wasting ball boy who was lying on top of the ball. Hazard was subsequently sent off for violent conduct and suspended for three games.

== Baseball ==
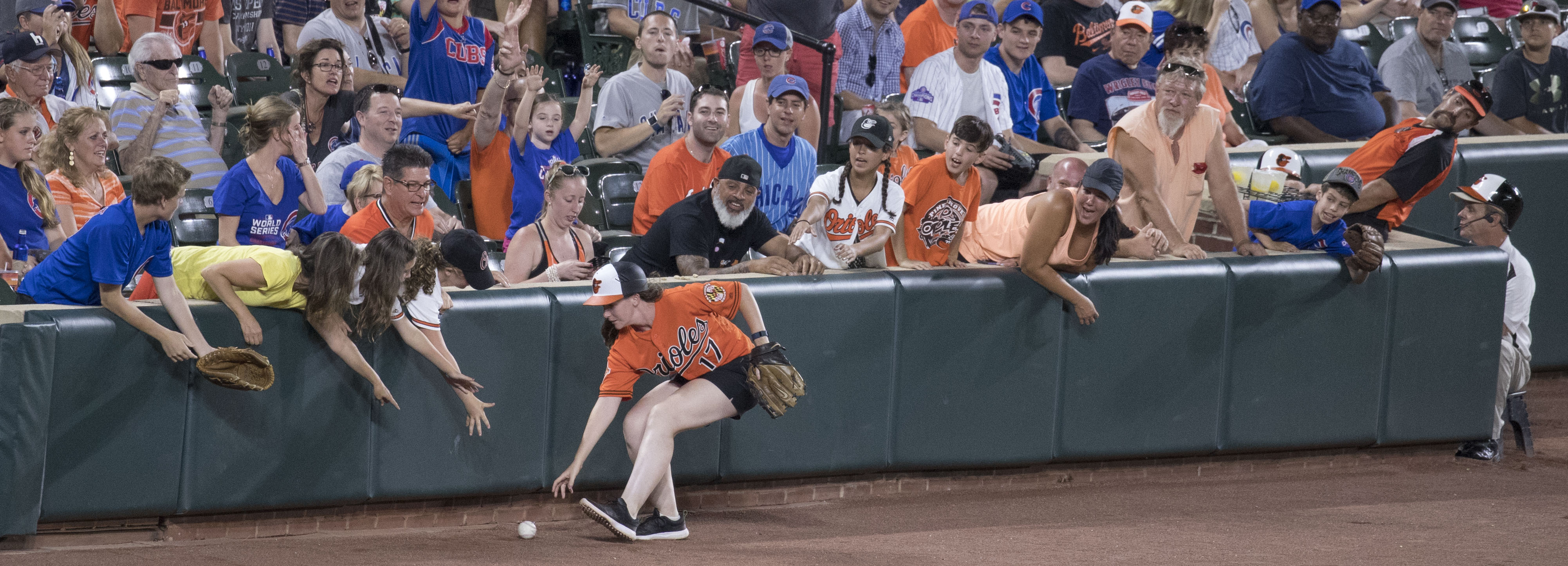
A ball girl retrieving a foul ball at a Baltimore Orioles game

Ball kids are stationed in out-of-play areas near the first and third base foul lines to retrieve out-of-play baseballs. They should not be confused with bat boys and bat girls, who remain in or near a team's dugout and the home plate area, primarily to tend to a team's baseball bats.

As ball kids are stationed on the field, albeit in foul territory, they can occasionally interfere with play; such events are governed by Rule 6.01(d), the main point of which is that if the interference is unintentional, any live ball remains alive and in play. For this reason, most teams will use experienced individuals who understand the rules, to minimize mistaken interference. One of the more infamous examples was the use of a Hooters girl as a promotion. The woman unfortunately snagged a ball that was fair and live in a Tampa Bay Rays game, throwing it to the fans. The batter was awarded a double on the interference.

Since 1992, the San Francisco Giants have employed older men as "balldudes", instead of the traditional youths. In 1993, Corinne Mullane became the first "balldudette", and she and her daughter Molly, who began working as a balldudette in the 2000s, have since been included in the National Baseball Hall of Fame as the first mother-daughter ball-retrieving duo in baseball.

== Cricket ==
Ball boys are stationed around the field just outside the boundary to retrieve any balls struck into the spectator stands or to the boundary rope.

In India, disabled people are not allowed to be ball-boys anymore after a controversy occurred in 2017, after criticism of the Board of Control for Cricket in India surrounding the appearance of a polio-afflicted fan who had been serving as a ball-boy for a few years.

== See also ==
- Water boy
- Boot boy
