= Logie Leggatt =

English cricketer

Logie Colin Leggatt (24 September 1894 – 31 July 1917) was an English sportsman and cricketer who was killed during the First World War.

== Life ==
Leggatt was born on 24 September 1894 at St John's Hill, Bangalore and was educated at Eton College and King's College, Cambridge.

Leggatt was a successful schoolboy cricketer in a strong Eton side, and scored 74 against Winchester in 1913. Going up to Cambridge in 1914 he made some big scores in Trial Matches but was unable to establish himself in the eleven. He played in a single first-class match for Cambridge, against Yorkshire and was dismissed by England internationals in each innings: Wilfred Rhodes for 3 in the first and Major Booth for 6 in the second.

He was a skilled Eton Wall Game player. During a St Andrew's Day match in 1912, he scored a goal for College against the Oppidans, an extraordinarily difficult feat. However, an Oppidan player claimed he had touched the ball before the goal was given, which according to the rule denies the goal. Leggatt honourably trusted the words of his opponent more than what he thought he had seen, and did not claim the goal. Since 1909 no goal has been scored in the Wall Game on St Andrew's Day - a handful have been scored in other matches. He has been memorialised each year since 2012 with the toast, 'In Piam Memoriam L.C.L.', said by the College Wall to the rest of the house at the Christmas Sock Supper.

Leggatt was commissioned a 2nd Lieutenant in the Coldstream Guards, and was killed by a sniper's bullet through the heart at Pilckem Ridge, Belgium on 31 July 1917, the opening day of the Battle of Passchendale. His love for Eton was portrayed in a letter he sent to his parents, bequeathing the £50 that he possessed to the College 'not that it will go very far'. He was wearing a College Wall scarf, in the colours purple and white, at the moment that he was killed. He is buried at Artillery Wood Commonwealth War Graves Commission Cemetery, where the epitaph on his gravestone reads "FLOREAT ETONA".

Logie's great-nephew George Leggatt was also a distinguished King's Scholar at Eton and Keeper of the Wall.

His aunt, Muriel Annie Thompson, served with the First Aid Nursing Yeomanry FANY in France from 1915 to 1918. She was awarded the British Military Medal, the Belgian Chevalier de l'Ordre de Leopold II and the French Croix de Guerre. She received the latter from Géneral de la Guiche in St Omer on 31 July 1918, writing in her diary of her grief that it was on the anniversary of Logie's death. (Muriel Thompson diary, FANY archives, London)
