= English public school football games =

Development and codification of football at English public schools

Forms of football were played at English public schools, leading to the first written codes of football including the Eton College (1815) and Aldenham school (1825) football rules, and Rugby School's rugby football (1845). The earliest known match between two schools was Eton College v. Harrow School in 1834. Rules of association football were later born when The Football Association began to accept the 1863 Cambridge rules through a meeting of the Football Association in 1863.

== History of football ==
=== Late middle ages ===
The earliest reference to ball games at English universities comes from 1303 when "Thomas of Salisbury, a student of Oxford University, found his brother Adam dead, and it was alleged that he was killed by Irish students, whilst playing the ball in the High Street towards Eastgate".

=== 16th century ===
The first direct evidence that games probably resembling football were being played at English public schools comes from the Vulgaria by William Horman in 1519. Horman had been headmaster at Eton (1485/6–1494/5) and Winchester College. His Latin textbook includes a translation exercise with the phrase "We wyll playe with a ball full of wynde", a rough translation of the original Latin "Lusui erit follis pugillari spiritu tumens", which Francis Peabody Magoun translated as "In sport we shall have a ball inflated with air to kick". As early as 1519, Horman wrote of the value of sports to children's education and the need to temper their enthusiasm in order not to affect their studies: "There muste be a measure in gyuynge of remedies or sportynge to chyldren, leste they be wery of goynge to theyr boke if they haue none, or waxe slacke if they haue to many".

This conflict was discussed further by Christopher Johnson, who was headmaster at Winchester in the 1560s. Johnson mentions the activities which he enjoyed when a scholar at Winchester himself between 1549 and 1553. He says that he "cared much more for balls, quoits and tops than he did for books and school".

Richard Mulcaster, a former student at Eton and later headmaster at Merchant Taylors' School (1561) and St Paul's School (1596), has been described as "the greatest sixteenth Century advocate of football". He wrote that towards the end of the 16th century football in England had grown to "greatnes ... [and was] much used ... in all places". Mulcaster mentioned "the hand ball" and "the armeball". He referred to the many benefits of his "footeball" in his personal publication of 1581 in English entitled 'Positions Wherein Those Primitive Circumstances Be Examined, Which Are Necessarie for the Training up of Children'. He stated that football had positive educational value and it promoted health and strength. Mulcaster describes a game for small teams that is organised under the auspices of a referee (and provides clear evidence that his game had evolved from disordered and violent "mob" football): "Some smaller number with such overlooking, sorted into sides and standings, not meeting with their bodies so boisterously to trie their strength: nor shouldring or shuffing one another so barbarously ... may use footeball for as much good to the body, by the chiefe use of the legges".

In 1591, it is clear that ball games were being played at Lyon's Free Grammar School in Harrow'. He says that "upon Thursday only sometimes when the weather is fine, and upon Saturday, or half-holidays after evening prayer. And their play shall be to drive a top, to toss a handball, to run, or to shoot".

=== 17th century Scotland ===
There is evidence that the rules where "hand tossing" was not allowed and where a player "kept goal" were first developed at Aberdeen Grammar School in Scotland, in the mid 17th century. In 1633 (cited in other references as 1636), David Wedderburn, a teacher from Aberdeen, mentioned elements of football games in a short Latin textbook called the "Vocabula". Wedderburn cites phrases that school boys might use during their game. The text below is given in two forms: Francis Peabody Magoun's 1938 original (and more literal) translation and then Marples 1956 version.

Let us choose sides//Let's pick sides.
pick your man first//You have first choice.
Those on our side come here//Those who are on our side, come over here.
How many are against us?/How many are there in the other team?
Kick out the ball so that we may begin the game/Kick off, so that we can begin the match.
Come, kick it here/Pass it here.
You keep the goal/You keep goal.
Snatch the ball from that fellow if you can/Get hold of the ball before he does, if you can manage it.
Come, throw yourself against him/Go on, intercept him.
Run at him/Charge him.
Kick the ball back/Pass the ball back.
Well done. You aren't doing anything/Well done! You’re slacking.
To make a goal/To score a goal.
This is the first goal, this the second, this the third/This is the second, this the third goal.
Drive that man back/Keep him out, otherwise the other side wins.
The opponents are, moreover, coming out on top, If you don't look out, he will make a goal/If you’re not careful, he’ll score in a minute.
Unless we play better, we'll be done for/If we don’t play better, we’re done for.
Ah, victory is in your hands/Hi! You’re the winners.
Ha, hurrah. He is a very skilled ball player/Hurrah! He’s a very good player.
Had it not been for him, we should have brought back the victory/If it has been for him we should have won.
Come, help me. We still have the better chance/Come on, help me. We still have a better side?"

The original Latin is cited by Magoun (1938): Sortiamur partes; tu primum socium dilige; Qui sunt nostrarum partium huc se recipient; Quot nobis adversantur; Excute pilam ut ineamus certamen; Age, huc percute; Tu tuere metum; Praeripe illi pilam si possis agere; Age objice te illi; Occurre illi; Repercute pilam; Egregie. Nihil agis; Transmittere metum pila; Hic primus est transmissus. Hic secundus, hic tertius est transmissus; Repelle eum, alioqui, adversarii evadunt superiores; Nisi cavesjam occupabit metam; Ni melius a nobis ludatur, de nobis actum est. Eia penes vos victoria est; Io triumphe. Est pilae doctissimus; Asque eo fuisset, reportassimus vicoriam; Age, subservi mihi; Adhuc potiores habemus, scilicet partes.

Another mention of football at public schools can be found in a Latin poem by Robert Matthew, a Winchester College scholar from 1643 to 1647. He describes how "...we may play quoits, or hand-ball, or bat-and-ball, or football; these games are innocent and lawful...". That football at Winchester was "innocent and lawful" at this time is very noteworthy.

A more detailed description of football is given in Francis Willughby's Book of Sports, written in about 1660. This account refers to football by name and describes goals and a pitch ("a close that has a gate at either end. The gates are called Goals"), tactics ("leaving some of their best players to guard the goal"), scoring ("they that can strike the ball through their opponents' goal first win") and the way teams were selected ("the players being equally divided according to their strength and nimbleness"). He describes a law of football: "They often break one another's shins when two meet and strike both together against the ball, and therefore there is a law that they must not strike higher than the ball". His account of the ball itself is "They blow a strong bladder and tie the neck of it as fast as they can, and then put it into the skin of a bull's cod and sew it fast in". He adds: "The harder the ball is blown, the better it flies. They used to put quicksilver into it sometimes to keep it from lying still". His book includes a basic diagram illustrating a football pitch.

=== 18th century ===
English public school football codes, with the schools that started them, and first confirmed dates

In 1710, football was recorded as being played on the green at Westminster School and the Abbey Chapter failing to repress it.

=== 19th century ===
The earliest versions of any football code rules were written down in the early 19th century, including by Eton College (1815) and Aldenham School (1825).

== Oldest school football clubs ==
These are the earliest schools to have evidence of regular, organised football. Each school originally played its own code.

Date	School	Current codes	Notes
1766	Eton College	Eton wall game, Eton field game, Rugby union, Association	Football fields established by 1766.
1794	Charterhouse School	Association	Football part of the school song in 1794. Played in the cloisters.
1813	Rugby School	Rugby union, Association	First definite reference to Bigside football being played at Rugby in 1813.
1814	Harrow School	Harrow football, Rugby union, Association	Football first mentioned in 1814 school diary.
1815	Westminster School	Association	Earliest reference in 1815 school documents. Played in the cloisters until the 1820s.
1825	Winchester College	Winchester College Football, Association	First known rules from 1825, 25 players a side.
1836	Shrewsbury School	Association, Rugby union	Established by new headmaster B.H. Kennedy in 1836.
1840	Haileybury College	Original school closed 1858	Football played from at least 1840 when ex-Rugby pupil joined the school.
1844	Cheltenham College	Rugby union, association	College Rugby club established 1844 by ex-Rugby school pupils.
1846	Sherborne School	Rugby union	Introduced by Headmaster Penrose in 1846.
1850	St Paul's School	Rugby union	Rugby was first played at St Paul's school in 1850, and the school was one of the founder members of the Rugby Football Union.
1850	Lancing College	Association	Football began two years after college founded.
1850	Durham School	Rugby union, Association	Club founded in 1850.
1852	Marlborough College	Rugby union, Association	First record of school match in 1852.
1852	Radley College	Rugby union, Association	Early pupil describes first football in 1852.
1854	Edinburgh Academy	Rugby union, Association	Crombie brothers introduced rugby rules from Durham School in 1854.
1856	St Peter's School, York	Rugby union	School's own rules, based on rugby code, first published 1856. There are also records of 'foote ball' being played at the school in 1566.
1856	Royal High School, Edinburgh	Rugby union, Association	Rugby rules brought to the school in 1856 by an English public schoolboy.
1856	Repton School	Association	Large school games played from circa 1856.
1856	Bedford School	Rugby union, Association	First record of match versus Bedford town eleven in 1856.
1857	Tonbridge School	Rugby union, Association	First record of school match.
1857	Uppingham School	Rugby union, Association	First football rules established in 1857.
1857	Forest School	Association	Established by new headmaster F.B. Guy in 1857.
1858	Chigwell School	Association	First recorded match in 1858.
1858	Rossall School	Association	First recorded match in 1858.
1858	Merchiston Castle School	Rugby union, Association	First recorded match in 1858.
1858	Melbourne Grammar School	Australian	First recorded match on 7 August 1858. Continues to contest the Cordner–Eggleston Cup.
1858	Scotch College, Melbourne	Australian	First recorded match on 7 August 1858. Continues to contest the Cordner–Eggleston Cup.
1859	Mill Hill School	Rugby union, Association	Gravel football pitch established by 1859.
1859	Brighton College	Rugby union, Association	First reported match in 1859.
1859	Merchant Taylors' School	Rugby union, Association	School club established 1859.
1862	Highgate School	Association	First recorded matches in 1862.

- Aldenham School F.C. was reported in The Football Annual 1873 (Charles Alcock) to have been founded in 1825 but there are no primary sources to support this and it is disputed.

The earliest known matches involving public schools are as follows:

- 9 December 1834: Eton College v. Harrow School.
- 1840s: Old Rugbeians v. Old Salopians (played at Cambridge University).
- 1840s: Old Rugbeians v. Old Salopians (played at Cambridge University the following year).
- 1852: Harrow School v. Westminster School.
- 13 February 1856: Charterhouse School v. St Bartholemew's Hospital.
- 1857: Haileybury College v. Westminster School.
- 24 February 1858: Forest School v. Chigwell School.
- 1858: Westminster School v. Winchester College.
- 24 November 1858: Westminster School v. Dingley Dell Club.

== Rugby football ==
William Webb Ellis, a pupil at Rugby school, is said to have "showed a fine disregard for the rules of football, as played in his time" by picking up the ball and running to the opponents' goal in 1823. This act is popularly said to be the beginnings of Rugby football, but the evidence for this bold act does not stand up to close examination and most sports historians believe the story to be apocryphal. In older forms of football, handling the ball was allowed, or even compulsory; for example, the English writer William Hone, writing in 1825 or 1826, quotes the social commentator Sir Frederick Eden, 2nd Baronet, regarding "Foot-Ball", as played at Scone, Scotland:

The game was this: he who at any time got the ball into his hands, run [sic] with it till overtaken by one of the opposite part; and then, if he could shake himself loose from those on the opposite side who seized him, he run on; if not, he threw the ball from him, unless it was wrested from him by the other party, but no person was allowed to kick it.

In 1845, three boys at Rugby school, William Delafield Arnold, W. W. Shirley and Frederick Hutchins, were tasked with codifying the rules then being used at the school.

== Association football ==
During the early-mid nineteenth century, different sets of rules for football began to be drawn up in schools, universities, and clubs. The first such set of rules to be published was that of Rugby School in 1845.

During the early 1860s, there were increasing attempts in England to unify and reconcile the various football games that were played in the public schools as well in the industrial north under the Sheffield Rules. In 1862, J. C. Thring, who had been one of the driving forces behind the original Cambridge Rules, was a master at Uppingham School and issued his own rules of what he called "The Simplest Game" (aka the Uppingham Rules). In early October 1863, a new set of Cambridge Rules was drawn up by a seven-member committee representing former pupils of Eton, Harrow, Shrewsbury, Rugby, Marlborough and Westminster.

After several meetings, the recently-published Cambridge Rules of 1863 were considered, which differed from the draft FA rules in two main areas – running with (carrying) the ball and hacking (kicking opposing players in the shins). After the final meeting on 8 December the FA published the "Laws of Football", the first comprehensive set of rules for the game later known as association football.

== Other codes ==
Some schools maintain their own football games – for example, the Field Game and the Wall Game at Eton; Harrow Football; and Winchester Football.

The first intercollegiate football game in the United States, between teams from Rutgers College (now Rutgers University) and the College of New Jersey (now Princeton University) took place in 1869 under the FA's 1863 rules, which were influenced by the 1863 Cambridge rules, developed by public school boys at the university. Subsequently, gridiron football developed from the rules of association football and rugby football.

== Contributions to the rules ==
=== Dribbling, passing, "scientific football" ===
Dribbling and passing of the ball (including forward passing) are all parts of public school games. In addition, the introduction of the FA rules that allowed both dribbling and forward passing of the ball were instigated by former public school boys. These key elements of modern Association football were taken from the various versions of public school association football. Dribbling was a key part of the Eton game and passing, in particular forward passing ("passing on") was argued for by representatives of Charterhouse during the establishment of the Football Association rules in the 1860s.

In 1856 Lancing College created its own code of association football which was regarded as a means of fostering teamwork.

"Scientific" football is first described in 1862 at Rugby School: here one could see "scientific play", magnificent "drops" and "gallant run ins".

Passing the ball continues to survive in traditional public school association football games. Even in Harrow Football, which is essentially a dribbling game, the ball may be chipped into the hands of a team-mate.

=== Half-time ===
The division of the game into two-halves was initiated to allow games between schools. The rules of one school would be played by for the first half, and the rules of the other school in the second half. Changing ends at half time (if no goals had been scored) was part of the following schools codes: Brighton, Eton, Rossall, Sheffield, Winchester. Other schools changed every time that side scored (Cheltenham, FA, Harrow, Marlborough, Rugby, Shrewsbury, Uppingham schools).

== See also ==
- Harrow Football
- Eton wall game
- Eton field game
- Winchester College Football
- History of rugby union
- History of rugby league
