= Eton field game =

Sport unique to and invented at Eton College

The field game is one of two codes of football devised and played at Eton College. The other is the Eton Wall Game. The game is like association football in some ways – the ball is round, but one size smaller than a standard football, and may not be handled – but the off-side rules – known as sneaking – are more in keeping with rugby. There is also a small scrum or bully of either six or seven a side. Goals can be scored much as in football, although there is no goalkeeper. But a team gains more points for scoring a rouge by kicking the ball so that it deflects off one of the opposing players, or achieve a charge-down, and then goes beyond the opposition's end of the pitch. The ball is then rougeable and must be touched – although not necessarily to the ground – by an attacking player to complete the rouge for five points. Rouges are similar to tries in that the scoring team then attempts to convert them for two points.

It is the only game at Eton that virtually every boy plays, at least for his first three years in the school, and it occupies prime position in the games programme throughout the Lent Half. Farrer House is generally accepted as the ultimate field game powerhouse, winning a plethora of titles and trophies.

== History ==
Although some sources claim that the rules of the field game were written down as early as 1815, this is contradicted by other sources, including the school's own archivist, who state that the first rules date from 1847.

Between 1811 and 1822, the field game was rarely played, with the wall game being more common: "[f]ootball was almost confined to the Wall game, and at most forty players, mostly constant", although there were also "occasional trifling games in the open [i.e., the field game], rare in interval and rare in players". An article on "Eton games" in the 19 November 1832 issue of the Eton College magazine gives a detailed discussion of the Wall game (called simply foot-ball), comparing it favourably to the game "played in the minor clubs of Eton, and in all other places, viz., that which takes place in an open field".

Eton field game was one of the first varieties of football to have match reports in the English press. The 29 November 1840 issue of Bell's Life in London featured a description of a game played on 23 November 1840: "The 7 got 1 'gaol' and 1 'ruge;' the 11 got 1 'gaol' and 4 'ruges.'" The House Football Cup was first awarded in 1860, making it one of the earliest trophies in any code of football. It was competed for annually into the 1960s.

In the modern era, referees are first advocated in English public school football games, notably Eton football in 1845.

== Positions ==
The positions in the field game are divided into two main groups: The "Bully" and the "Behinds".

Bully

The "Bully" is most aptly compared to the forwards in the game of rugby and consists of, 3 "Corners", 2 "Sideposts", 1 "Post", 1 "Bup" and the "Fly".

Behinds

The 'behinds' are a group of players made up of two 'Shorts' and a 'Long'. The job of the Shorts is to kick the ball over the Bully, and allow players of their own side to run onto the ball, and hopefully to either score a goal or rouge. The opposing Shorts are trying to do the same thing, and so a kicking war often develops between the two teams of Shorts. This can be advantageous for a team with a fitter bully, as it gives them an opportunity to create an off-side "Sneaking", and then win a kick. The Long essentially remains in the goal-mouth, and his job is to kick back any ball which goes over the Shorts, or to defend the goal. He is not like a goalkeeper in football, however, as he cannot use his hands to prevent a goal.

== Laws ==
=== Penalties ===
When a foul occurs, there are two main ways of restarting the game. One way is a bully, with the non-offending team having heads. Alternatively, for more serious offences, a kick can be given, which is similar to a free-kick in football.

=== Scoring ===
There are two main ways of gaining points in the field game, either a rouge or a goal.

==== Goals ====
There is a goal at each end of the pitch. The goals are smaller than in football but no player is allowed to use their hands to touch the ball. If a player kicks the ball into the opponent's goal his team scores 3 points.

==== Rougeables ====
If the ball comes from a defender and goes behind the infinite line created by extending their goal line, it is rougeable. The ball is also rougeable when a defender kicks it so that it rebounds off an attacker over the goal line, in such a case where, in the opinion of the referee, the attacker makes no deliberate attempt to play the ball over the line. A contact rougeable may also be created by an attacker if he plays the ball over the infinite line from close range while in contact (other than via the arm below the elbow) with a defender.

When a ball is rougeable, players from both teams race to reach it first.

If an attacker reaches it first their team scores a rouge, worth five points, and also attempts a conversion (see below).

If a defender reaches it first the attacking team has a choice of point or bully: they can choose either to be awarded a single point or to form a bully (like a scrum), close to the opponent's end of the pitch. If they drive the ball over the end of the pitch they score a bully rouge (5 points) and as before can convert it.

==== Conversions ====
In a conversion the attackers move the ball down tramlines at the end of the pitch from the side towards the goal. The attacker has to keep the ball moving and avoid it leaving the tramlines. They try either to score a goal or to hit the ball off a defender to score a rouge.

The conversion in its current form was introduced by rule changes in 2002. It replaced the ram, in which a column of four players from the attacking side lifted their feet to the sound of "left up right up left up right up, one two three", then, to the shout of "ram", charged a defensive goalpost scrum from a range of 2.5 yards with the aim of forcing the ball over the line between the posts.

== See also ==
- English public school football games
