= Frank Marshall (referee) =

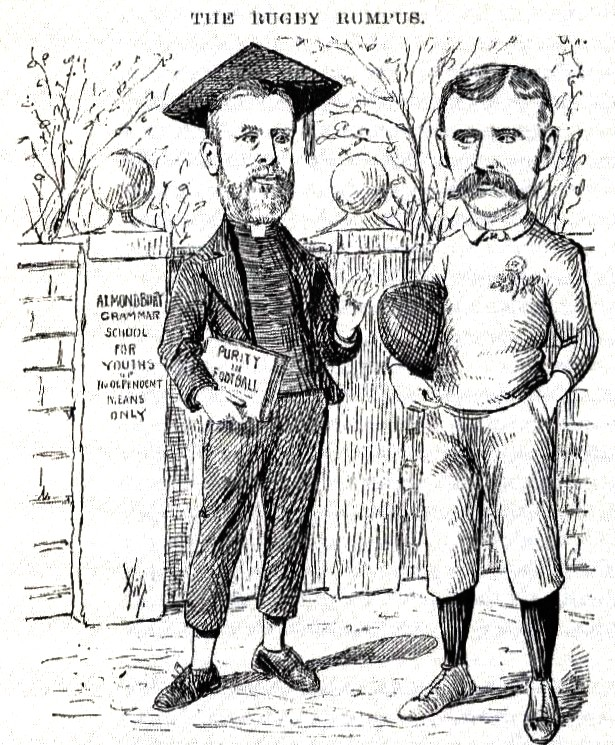
- Rev. Frank Marshall (left) portrayed in a satirical cartoon
- Born: Francis Marshall; 19 September 1845; West Bromwich, Staffordshire, England
- Died: 21 April 1906 (aged 60); Mileham, Norfolk, England
- Occupations: Church of England Minister, Rugby Union referee & Headmaster
- Known for: Defending the amateur status of Rugby Union in the British Isles
- Title: Reverend

Francis Marshall known as Frank Marshall (19 September 1845 – 21 April 1906) was a British schoolmaster, cleric and rugby administrator. A fierce advocate of amateurism in the early years of rugby football, his hardline position on payments to players contributed to the schism in the game in 1895 and the birth of the breakaway Rugby League.

Marshall, who opposed the introduction of so-called "broken-time payments", made by clubs in northern England to compensate working men for wages lost while playing matches, has been described as the "witch-finder general, rooting out incipient professionalism".

The debate about Marshall continues into the 21st century. In 2021 the Old Almondburians Society sought permission to erect a blue plaque to Marshall on the old schoolhouse. The planning application was rejected by Kirklees Council for whom an officer said "Whether his actions were driven by prejudice towards working class people or by his adherence to the purity of amateurism in Rugby Union is debatable, but his words and actions would be out of place in contemporary society without contextual explanation."

== Life ==
Born in West Bromwich, Marshall attended Brewood Grammar School before studying at St John's College, Cambridge. The headmaster of Almondbury Grammar School, Huddersfield, (now King James's School, Almondbury), Marshall believed rugby was a middle-class pastime. He burnished his reputation as “the man with bell, book and candle facing the evil spirit of professionalism” by banning his own club, Huddersfield, in 1893 for breaching the amateur code.

== In literature ==
Marshall, the author of Football: The Rugby Union Game, first published in 1892, features as a central character in Broken Time, a play by Mick Martin that had its premiere at the Theatre Royal, Wakefield in 2011.
