= Harrow football =

Type of football

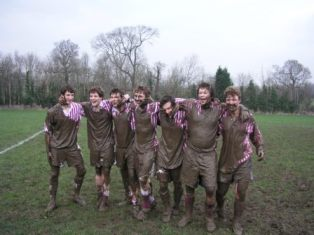
Rendalls boys after a muddy Harrow football game (circa 2005)

Harrow football is a code of football played between two teams of eleven players, each attempting to win by scoring more bases (goals) than their opponent. Harrow Football is played predominantly with the feet, but players may use any part of their body including, in certain circumstances, their hands and arms to propel the ball. The leather ball is shaped like a giant pork pie, about 18 inches in diameter and 12 inches (300 mm) deep. It tends to soak up mud and water and become extremely heavy. It is believed to be ancestral to other football codes including Association football and possibly Australian rules football.

The oldest surviving rules for Harrow football were drawn up in 1858, though it is likely to have been played exclusively at Harrow School earlier than this, both between teams of boys currently at the school and between boys at the school and old boys. The school now also play a small number of exhibition games against non-Harrow or Old Harrovian opposition. This includes games against Eton, Sunningdale Prep School Masters, Mossbourne Academy, Hatch End High School and The John Lyon School.

== Nature of the game ==
Two teams of equally numbered players each compete to get a ball (itself known as a football) into the other team's goal, thereby scoring a base. The team which has scored the most bases at the conclusion of the game is the winner; if both teams have an equal number of bases then the game is a draw. Players mainly use their feet to move the ball around, and in general they may use any part of their bodies other than their hands or arms. But they can catch the ball with their hands if it has not touched the ground since it was kicked, and the kick was not a forward pass from a fellow team member.

In typical game play, players attempt to move towards a base through individual control of the ball, such as by dribbling (running with the ball close to their feet), by passing the ball from teammate to teammate and by taking shots at the base. Opposition players may try to regain control of the ball by intercepting a pass or through tackling the opponent who controls the ball. Tackling usually means barging a player on the opposing side. Barging must be done with the shoulder and must not be from directly behind the opponent as to hit their back. You are permitted to tackle even if the opponent is not in possession of the ball.

Harrow Football is generally a free-flowing game with the ball in play at all times except when it has left the field of play over a boundary line, or play has been stopped by the referee. When play has been stopped, it recommences with a specified restart (see below).

== The Laws of the Game ==
=== Overview of the Laws ===
The Laws of Harrow football are often framed in broad terms, which allows flexibility in their application depending on the nature of the game. There is no definitive guide and arguments over more obscure laws on the sidelines often result because of this.

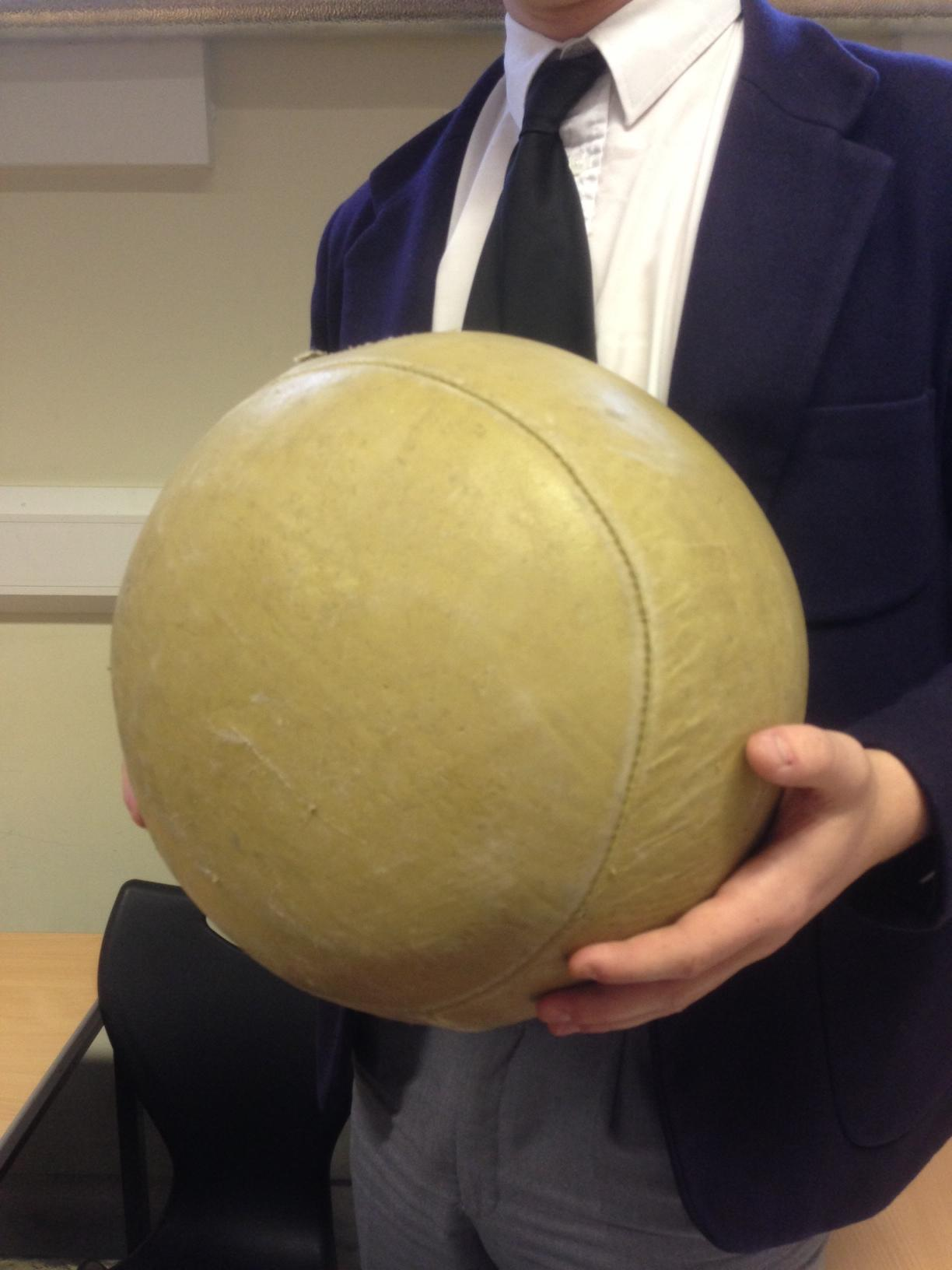
Pupil holding a harrow football

=== Players and equipment ===
Teams consist of equal numbers of players (excluding substitutes). There is no upper limit to the number of players, although it is most common to field eleven players in inter-house and other organised matches. Competition rules may state a minimum number of players required to constitute a team (this is usually seven). There are a variety of positions in which the players are strategically placed, though these positions are not defined or required by the Laws. The positions are usually the backs (also referred to as the threes on account of their number), the forwards and the wings. There are two wings on each wing to facilitate the giving of "yards". The backs pivot on the centre back depending on the position of the ball - hence the graceful alignment referred to in the Harrow Song "Yards". The forwards are often four in number and are the powerhouse which clears the way to allow the ball to be taken forward.

The basic equipment players are required to wear includes a shirt (usually the colour of a Harrow School boarding house or the official Harrow School colour), shorts, socks and footwear. Players are forbidden to wear or use anything that is dangerous to themselves or another player (including jewellery).

A number of players may be replaced by substitutes during the course of the game.

=== Officials ===
A game is ideally presided over by two umpires, whose decisions regarding facts connected with play are final. Each umpire carries a Yard Stick: a wooden stick used to mark the place from which yards are taken. Games were traditionally umpired by each House providing one umpire each. However, nowadays umpiring is undertaken by Beaks (Harrow Masters), House Masters and senior boys.

=== Playing field ===
Harrow Football is usually played on a pitch similar to rugby or association football pitch. The pitch can be muddy, wet, and even waterlogged. It is usually 100–130 yards (90–120m) in length by 50–100 yards (45–90m) in width. The pitch must be rectangular, with the length (touch lines) longer than the width (goal lines).

On the goal line at each end of the field is a 'base' which looks like rugby posts with their crossbar removed so a base may be scored at any point through them. The inner edges of the base posts must be 6 yards (5.5 m) apart.

The field has no other field markings, except for a half-way line which spans the width of the pitch and is equidistant from each goal line.

=== Duration ===
A standard Harrow football match consists of two periods (known as halves) of 40 minutes each. There is usually a 15-minute break between halves, known as half time. The end of the match is known as full-time.

=== Boshing ===
Boshing is the form of tackle used in Harrow Football. It is performed by a member of either the defensive or the offensive side, and its use is warranted by being within a reasonable distance from the ball. To perform a bosh, a member of one side shoulder barges a member of the opposition. There are several limitations to the bosh, as the bosher may not raise his arms or use his elbows, and it must be performed from either the front or the side (not behind). Any breach of these rules results in a Foul.

=== Starts and re-starts ===
Each playing period in Harrow football commences with a kick-off, which is a set kick from the centre by one team. The person kicking the ball does so by dropping it from his hands. At the kick-off all players are required to be in their half of the field until the ball is kicked. Kick-offs are also used to restart play following a base, though the team kicking off also has the option of dribbling the ball rather than kicking it.

Teams alternate taking the kick-off after each base, regardless of which team scored the base. The only exception is after half time, when the team who did not kick-off at the beginning of the match takes the kick.

From the initial kick-off of a period until the end of that period, the ball is "in play" at all times until the end of the playing period, except when the ball leaves the field of play or play is stopped by one of the umpires; in these cases play is restarted by one of the following five methods:

- Kick-off: following a base, or to begin each period of play.
- Throw-in: when the ball has wholly crossed the touchline; awarded to opposing team to that which last touched the ball. Ball may be thrown with one hand (and usually is, due to its weight). The receiving players usually 'head' or 'shoulder' it on from the throw.
- Base kick: when the ball has wholly crossed the base line without a base having been scored and having last been touched by an attacker; awarded to defending team. Taken from the baseline.
- Corner throw: when the ball has wholly crossed the base line without a goal having been scored and having last been touched by a defender; awarded to attacking team. The ball is thrown in from the point where the ball crossed the baseline. There is a formation similar to that of a 'line-out' in rugby allowed, with any number of players allowed in the line, so long as the opposing team supplies an equal number of players. There are no requirements as to how far the ball needs to be thrown, but the players must stand three yards or more from the base line to receive the ball.
- Yards: when the ball has been caught by a player either from the foot of an opposing player or from the foot of a team player who is playing back into their own half; awarded to the team whose member caught the ball. The umpire places their Yardstick on the pitch at the point that Yards is called. The player who caught the ball may take any length of run up, but may only take three strides after the yardstick has been reached. After this, they may take a shot at goal or kick the ball up and back to another player on their team (known as a 'transfer'). Yards can be called by the second player, but no strides may be taken unless the original player took none. For these kicks, the opposing team must stand no closer than ten yards in front of the kicker and may only build a wall with one or two players. Scoring a base without yards is possible but very difficult due to the muddy conditions the game is played in.

=== Fouls and misconduct ===
A foul occurs when a player commits a specific offence against an opponent, for example handling the ball, tripping an opponent, barging an opponent in the back, pulling at an opponent's shirt, etc., are punishable by a free kick depending on where the offence occurred.

Misconduct may occur at any time, and need not be against an opponent. Whilst the offences that constitute misconduct are listed, the definitions are broad. In particular, the offence of "unsporting behaviour" may be used to deal with most events that violate the spirit of the game, even if they are not listed as specific offences.

=== Offside ===
A player is deemed to be offside when they are positioned in front of the direction of play. When passing, the ball must either go backwards, or be kicked forwards and run onto from behind, similar to rugby. When a player is offside, other players will sometimes yell "you're off."

== Competitions ==
Harrow football is played between teams consisting of boys from each Harrow School boarding house between January and April each year. During the same period there are often matches between a school team and various teams consisting of old boys. In February each year, there are organised matches between teams from each school boarding house and old boys as part of the Harrow School Founders Day celebrations. Games are also played against the University of Newcastle.

== Names of the game ==
Harrow football is commonly known as footer within the bounds of Harrow School.

== Harrow Football in school songs ==
A number of Harrow Songs celebrate Harrow football, possibly more than the songs celebrating any other aspect of school life. They range from the well known "Yards" to less accessible songs such as "Plump-a-Lump".

== See also ==
- English public school football games
