= Multiball system =

Association football terminology

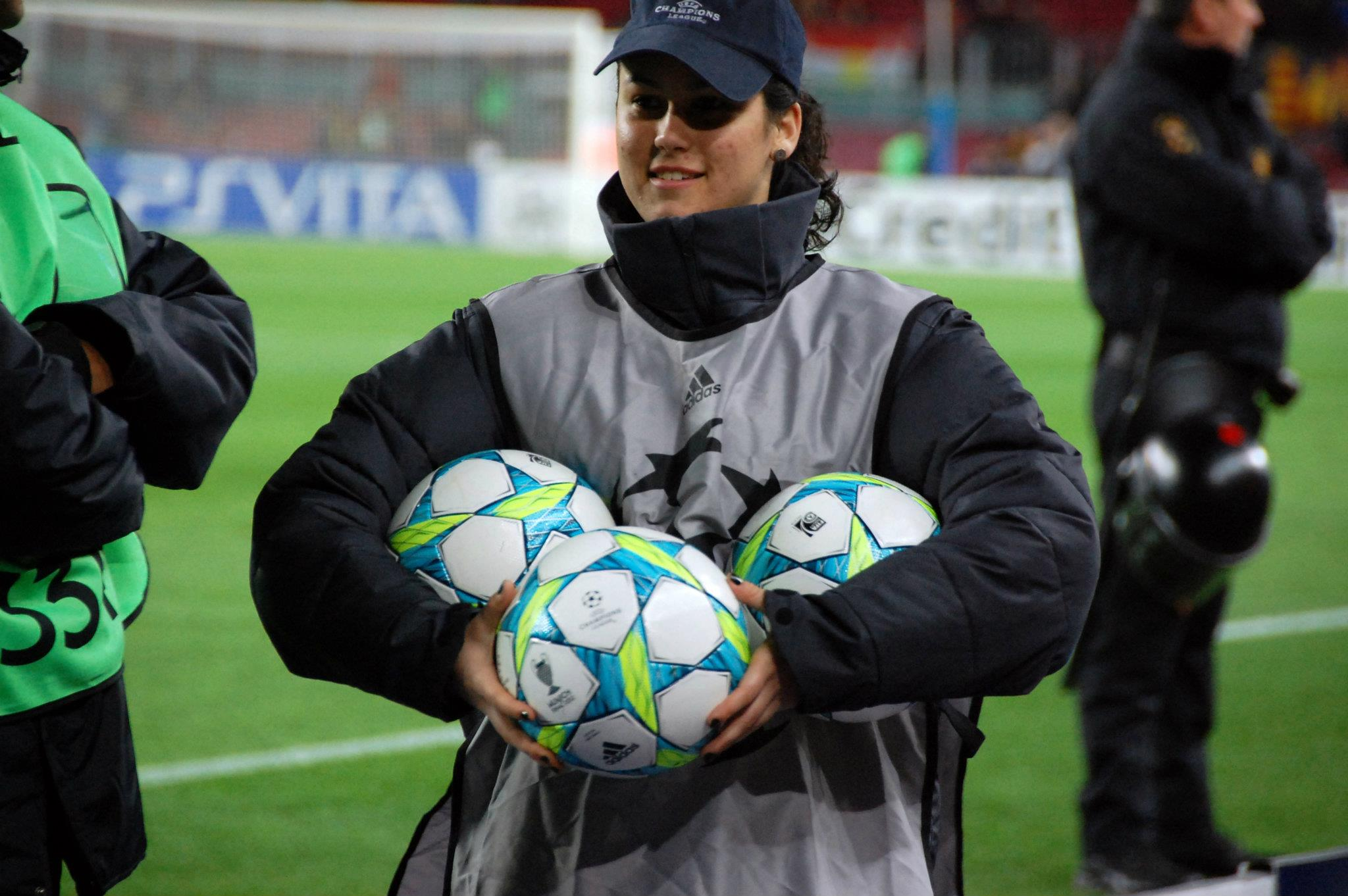
A ball tender at a UEFA Champions League match in 2012. All UEFA competitions use a multiball system.

The multiball system in football permits a match immediately to resume with another ball when the original match ball goes out of play. The International Football Association Board laws of the game were changed for the 2006/2007 edition to make it legal to use more than a single ball per game.

Traditionally, professional football matches employ the use of a single ball, and when the ball leaves the field of play, the game pauses until the ball is returned. According to the Laws of the Game, the ball may be changed on the "authority of the referee" if it "bursts or becomes defective", though typically it will also be replaced if kicked out of the stadium.

However, a new system was introduced by some football leagues and associations to increase the number of match balls used per game. In the multiball system, a number of match balls, often seven, are held by ball boys around the edge of the pitch. When one ball leaves the field of play, the nearest ball boy will release another ball to a player, allowing the game to resume immediately. The system is used for UEFA European club tournaments, international competitions and the FIFA World Cup. The Premier League introduced the system in 2022-23, initially with 10 balls, and as of 2026 uses 15 balls - one on the field of play, one with the fourth official, and 13 distributed around the field. The English Football League mandated the multiball system from the 2023-24 season; prior to this home teams had been free to choose whether to use the system The National League introduced the multiball system from the 2025-26 season, with 10 balls (one on the field of play, one with the fourth official, and eight distributed around the field

== Multiball system use ==
Nation	Competition	Multiball system	Single match ball	Optional
England	Premier League	Yes		
England	Football League	Yes		
England	FA Cup		Yes	
England	EFL Cup	Yes		
UEFA	UEFA European Championship	Yes		
UEFA	UEFA Champions League	Yes		
UEFA	UEFA Europa League	Yes		

== Criticism ==
While some commentators and managers support the system for maintaining the speed and flow of the game, others suggest that the way the system is implemented favours the home team.

=== Ballboys influencing matches ===
On 26 December 2023, while playing away at Bournemouth, the Fulham goalkeeper Bernd Leno pushed a Bournemouth ballboy in frustration while taking the football from him after it went out of play. The referee, Tim Robinson, asked for the Bournemouth stadium ballboys to retire from their duties, resulting in the cancellation of the multiball system for the rest of the match. Leno apologised to the boy during a later break in play.
