= 2018 West Coast Eagles season =

Australian rules football team in Perth, Western Australia

West Coast Eagles
2018 season
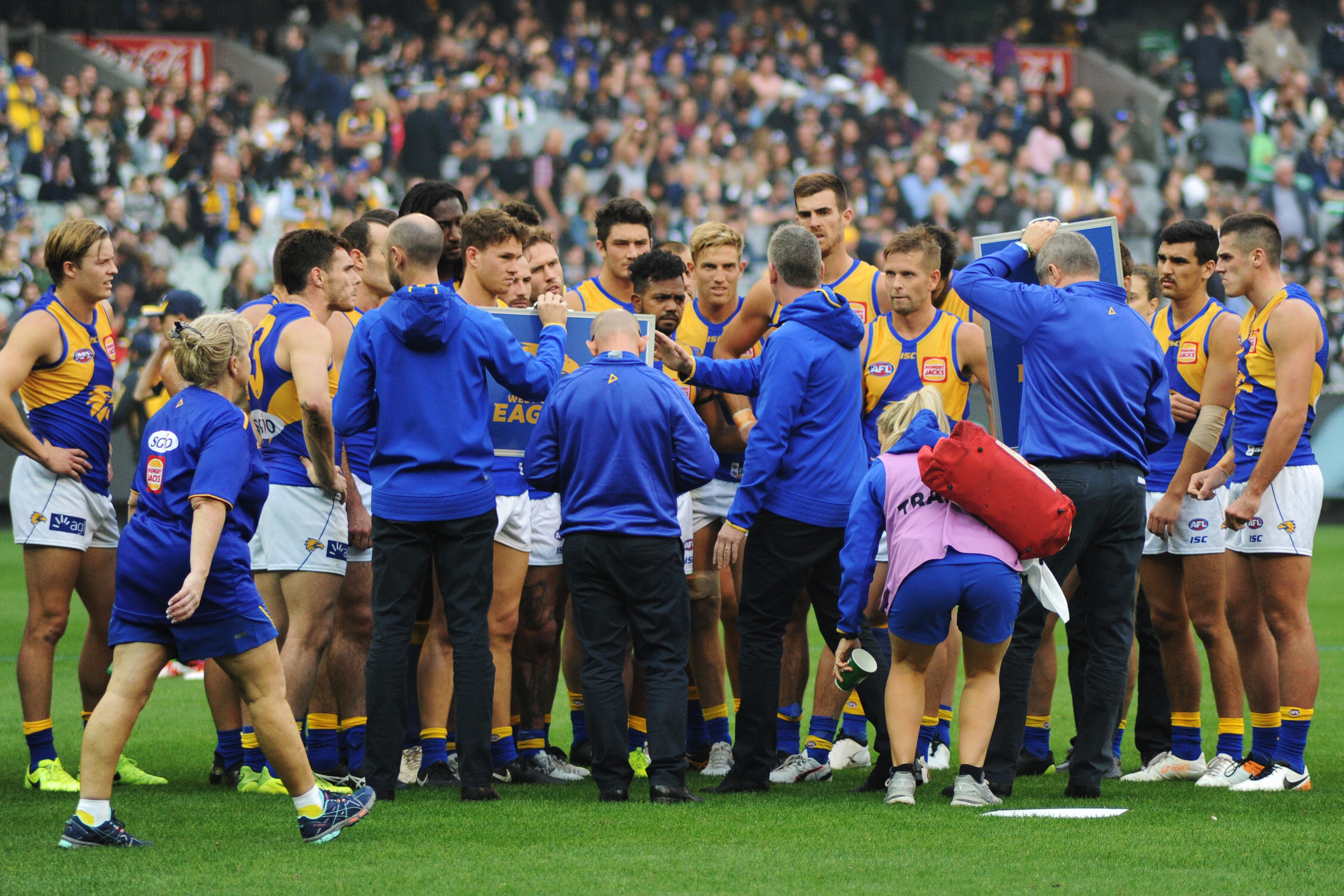
- Team huddle in round 5
- Coach: Adam Simpson (5th season)
- Captains: Shannon Hurn (4th season)
- Home ground: Optus Stadium
- AFL season: 2nd
- Best and Fairest: Elliot Yeo
- Leading goalkicker: Jack Darling (48)
- Highest home attendance: 100,022 vs. Collingwood (Grand Final)
- Lowest home attendance: 46,854 vs Western Bulldogs (round 18)
- Club membership: 80,290

The West Coast Eagles are an Australian rules football team based in Perth, Western Australia. Their 2018 season was their 32nd season in the Australian Football League (AFL), their fifth season under coach Adam Simpson, and their fourth season with Shannon Hurn as captain. The West Coast Eagles finished the season with 16 wins and 6 losses, placing them second on the ladder, qualifying for the 2018 AFL finals series. They would go on to win the Grand Final by 5 points against Collingwood.

== Background ==
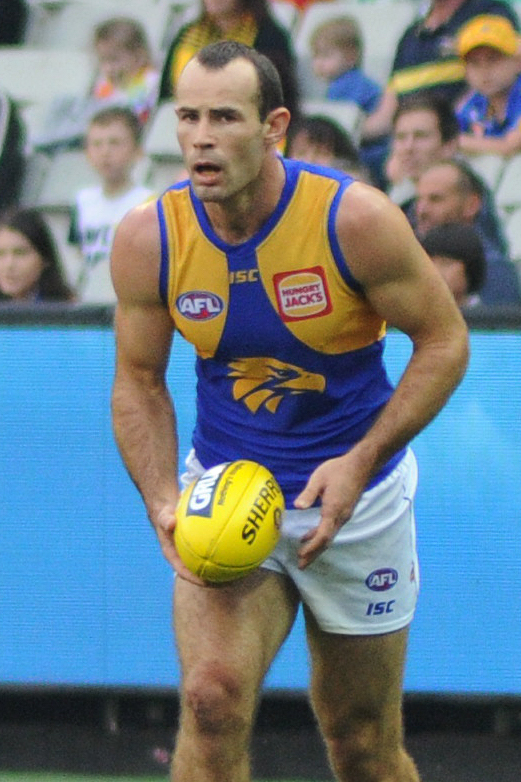
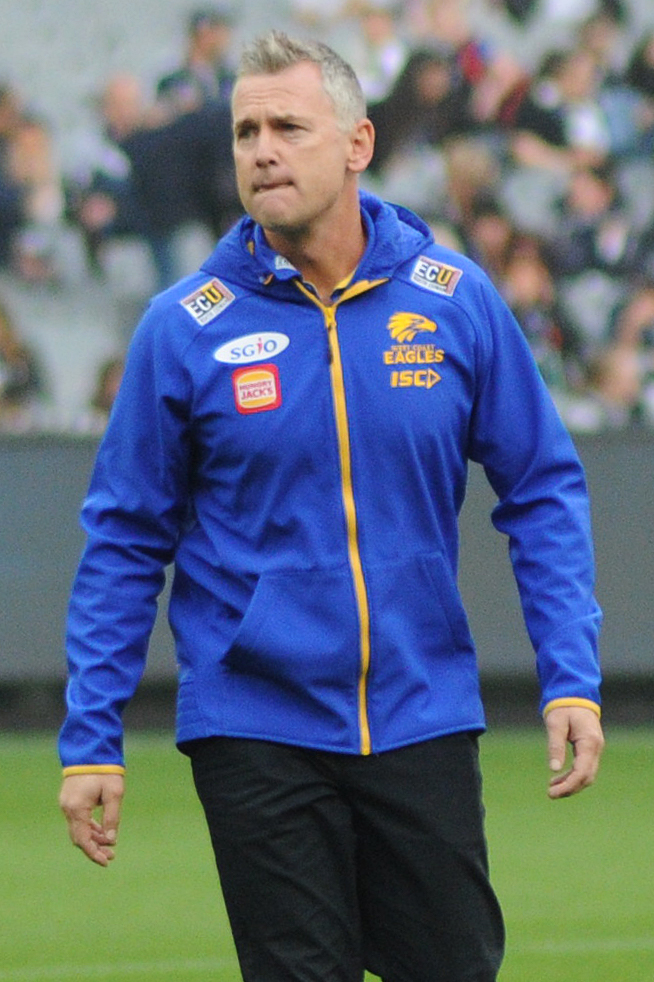
Shannon Hurn (captain) and Adam Simpson (coach)

The West Coast Eagles are an Australian rules football team based in Perth, Western Australia, that competes in the Australian Football League (AFL). They finished the 2017 home-and-away season eighth on the ladder. They were eliminated in the semi-finals.

Shannon Hurn was the team's captain in 2018 for a fourth consecutive year. Adam Simpson was the team's senior coach.

West Coast had 80,290 members in 2018, a 23.40% increase on 2017 numbers.

== Playing list ==
=== Statistics ===
Playing list and statistics
Player	No.	Games	Goals	Behinds	Kicks	Handballs	Disposals	Marks	Tackles	Notes/Milestone(s)
Liam Ryan	1	13	20	15	113	37	150	37	25	AFL debut (round 1)
Mark LeCras	2	23	32	21	230	101	331	89	70	
Andrew Gaff	3	19	12	4	339	244	583	100	56	
Dom Sheed	4	18	8	7	231	182	413	72	33	
Brad Sheppard	5	23	0	1	253	120	373	148	53	
Elliot Yeo	6	25	14	15	390	225	615	129	167	
Chris Masten	7	24	7	5	274	190	464	140	42	
Jack Redden	8	25	10	4	351	277	628	140	118	
Nic Naitanui	9	15	6	5	82	81	163	25	64	
Jarrod Brander	10	1	0	1	5	0	5	3	1	AFL debut (round 13)
Oscar Allen	12	2	0	1	13	8	21	8	5	AFL debut (round 16)
Luke Shuey	13	20	6	7	257	219	476	63	97	
Liam Duggan	14	24	2	2	291	116	407	115	49	
Jamie Cripps	15	25	38	18	249	149	398	122	97	
Eric Mackenzie	16	0	—N/a	—N/a	—N/a	—N/a	—N/a	—N/a	—N/a	
Josh Kennedy	17	14	43	20	117	38	155	68	28	
Daniel Venables	18	15	9	9	75	69	144	42	38	
Nathan Vardy	19	10	7	4	37	44	81	26	29	
Jeremy McGovern	20	24	6	2	259	97	356	169	31	
Jack Petruccelle	21	3	2	0	7	9	16	3	3	AFL debut (round 6)
Hamish Brayshaw	22	0	—N/a	—N/a	—N/a	—N/a	—N/a	—N/a	—N/a	
Lewis Jetta	23	20	1	1	227	101	328	91	32	
Luke Partington	24	0	—N/a	—N/a	—N/a	—N/a	—N/a	—N/a	—N/a	
Shannon Hurn	25	25	1	2	430	101	531	196	44	
Francis Watson	26	0	—N/a	—N/a	—N/a	—N/a	—N/a	—N/a	—N/a	Rookie
Jack Darling	27	21	48	27	188	88	276	129	50	
Tom Cole	28	21	0	1	151	124	275	73	51	
Scott Lycett	29	25	10	10	167	145	312	69	83	
Jackson Nelson	30	10	0	2	79	21	100	36	8	
Will Schofield	31	12	0	0	64	28	92	40	16	
Ryan Burrows	32	0	—N/a	—N/a	—N/a	—N/a	—N/a	—N/a	—N/a	Rookie
Brayden Ainsworth	33	3	1	0	27	14	41	10	13	AFL debut (round 8)
Mark Hutchings	34	20	9	5	212	130	342	69	87	
Josh Rotham	35	0	—N/a	—N/a	—N/a	—N/a	—N/a	—N/a	—N/a	
Fraser McInnes	36	3	1	3	15	10	25	9	8	Rookie
Tom Barrass	37	19	0	0	193	49	242	124	15	
Kurt Mutimer	38	0	—N/a	—N/a	—N/a	—N/a	—N/a	—N/a	—N/a	
Malcolm Karpany	39	0	—N/a	—N/a	—N/a	—N/a	—N/a	—N/a	—N/a	
Tony Olango	40	0	—N/a	—N/a	—N/a	—N/a	—N/a	—N/a	—N/a	Rookie
Brendon Ah Chee	41	8	2	5	54	55	109	30	25	West Coast debut (round 8)
Tarir Bayok	42	0	—N/a	—N/a	—N/a	—N/a	—N/a	—N/a	—N/a	Rookie
Matthew Allen	43	0	—N/a	—N/a	—N/a	—N/a	—N/a	—N/a	—N/a	
Willie Rioli	44	24	28	14	182	90	272	77	63	AFL debut (round 2)
Jake Waterman	45	16	13	12	118	60	178	75	23	AFL debut (round 1)
Callan England	46	0	—N/a	—N/a	—N/a	—N/a	—N/a	—N/a	—N/a	Rookie

== Season summary ==
West Coast started the 2018 season by facing Sydney in the first AFL match at the newly opened Perth Stadium (known under sponsorship as Optus Stadium). The Eagles lost that match by 29 points. West Coast would then go on to win their next 10 matches, the most notable of which was against Richmond at Optus Stadium in round 9. Richmond were the reigning premiers, and ladder leaders at the time, having lost just one game, and were ahead of West Coast on the ladder by percentage only. The Eagles managed to win that game by 47 points, putting West Coast first on the ladder and in serious contention for the premiership.

After their round 12 bye, West Coast lost the next three matches against Sydney, Essendon and Adelaide. West Coast broke their streak of bad games by beating Greater Western Sydney in round 16. This was followed by wins against Collingwood, Western Bulldogs, a loss against North Melbourne in Hobart, and a win against Fremantle in the season's second Western Derby. During the Derby, Eagles midfielder Andrew Gaff made an unprovoked and off-the-ball punch on Fremantle's Andrew Brayshaw, breaking his jaw. Gaff was criticised for this on social media and figures in the AFL world. Gaff received an eight match suspension for this punch.

The following week after the Western Derby, West Coast beat Port Adelaide after Jeremy McGovern kicked a goal after the siren. West Coast did not have the lead at any point during the match, and came from four goals down to win the game. This was the second time in a year within a year that West Coast beat Port Adelaide with a goal after the siren, the first being an elimination final in 2017. West Coast would then lose the second last match of the season to Melbourne, and win the last match against Brisbane Lions. At the end of the season, West Coast were second on the ladder, only behind Richmond. This qualified West Coast to have two home finals.

Their first final was a qualifying final against Collingwood. The Eagles came from 10 points down at three quarter time to win by 16 points. This sent West Coast into a preliminary final two weeks later against Melbourne. In the match, West Coast thrashed Melbourne by 66 points. In the first half, Melbourne scored no goals, the first time this happened in a final since 1927. This win sent West Coast into the 2018 AFL Grand Final against Collingwood at the Melbourne Cricket Ground.

In the first quarter of the grand final, West Coast trailed by as much as 29 points, as Collingwood kicked the opening five goals. From there, the Eagles clawed back the margin back to zero by three quarter time. In the final quarter, the Magpies kicked two early goals, leaving much of the rest of the quarter for the Eagles to be trailing. With two minutes remaining, and West Coast two points down, Dom Sheed kicked the winning goal from the boundary. The Grand Final finished with West Coast winning their fourth AFL premiership.

=== Results ===
Regular season results
Round	Day	Date	Result	Score			Opponent	Score			Ground		Attendance	Ladder
Round	Day	Date	Result	G	B	T	Opponent	G	B	T	Ground		Attendance	Ladder
1	Sunday	25 March	Lost	13	8	86	Sydney	18	7	115	Optus Stadium	H	53,553	14th
2	Sunday	1 April	Won	18	13	121	Western Bulldogs	9	16	70	Etihad Stadium	A	22,868	8th
3	Sunday	8 April	Won	14	11	95	Geelong	11	14	80	Optus Stadium	H	54,535	5th
4	Saturday	14 April	Won	21	13	139	Gold Coast	9	5	59	Optus Stadium	H	51,774	2nd
5	Saturday	21 April	Won	10	19	79	Carlton	10	9	69	Melbourne Cricket Ground	A	27,900	2nd
6	Sunday	29 April	Won	13	11	89	Fremantle	12	9	81	Optus Stadium	A	56,521	2nd
7	Saturday	5 May	Won	16	6	102	Port Adelaide	9	6	60	Optus Stadium	H	50,516	2nd
8	Saturday	12 May	Won	12	14	86	Greater Western Sydney	8	13	61	Spotless Stadium	A	9,253	2nd
9	Sunday	20 May	Won	20	10	130	Richmond	12	11	83	Optus Stadium	H	57,616	1st
10	Sunday	27 May	Won	11	9	75	Hawthorn	9	6	60	Etihad Stadium	A	28,077	1st
11	Saturday	2 June	Won	16	5	101	St Kilda	14	4	88	Optus Stadium	H	54,188	1st
12	Bye													1st
13	Friday	15 June	Lost	7	15	57	Sydney	10	12	72	Sydney Cricket Ground	A	36,402	2nd
14	Thursday	21 June	Lost	6	16	52	Essendon	12	8	80	Optus Stadium	H	51,409	3rd
15	Saturday	30 June	Lost	12	6	78	Adelaide	12	16	88	Adelaide Oval	A	44,771	3rd
16	Sunday	8 July	Won	13	8	86	Greater Western Sydney	10	15	75	Optus Stadium	H	52,105	3rd
17	Sunday	15 July	Won	15	12	102	Collingwood	9	13	67	Melbourne Cricket Ground	A	53,439	2nd
18	Sunday	22 July	Won	14	16	100	Western Bulldogs	6	10	46	Optus Stadium	H	46,854	2nd
19	Sunday	29 July	Lost	6	5	41	North Melbourne	12	9	81	Blundstone Arena	A	11,176	2nd
20	Sunday	5 August	Won	21	16	142	Fremantle	13	6	84	Optus Stadium	H	57,375	2nd
21	Saturday	11 August	Won	9	8	62	Port Adelaide	9	4	58	Adelaide Oval	A	32,534	2nd
22	Sunday	19 August	Lost	14	7	91	Melbourne	16	12	108	Optus Stadium	H	55,824	2nd
23	Sunday	26 August	Won	14	14	98	Brisbane Lions	11	6	72	The Gabba	A	16,367	2nd
QF	Saturday	8 September	Won	12	14	86	Collingwood	10	10	70	Optus Stadium	H	59,585	—N/a
PF	Saturday	22 September	Won	18	13	121	Melbourne	7	13	55	Optus Stadium	H	59,608	—N/a
GF	Saturday	29 September	Won	11	13	79	Collingwood	11	8	74	Melbourne Cricket Ground	H	100,022	—N/a

=== Ladder ===
Pos	Team	Pld	W	L	D	PF	PA	PP	Pts	Qualification
1	Richmond	22	18	4	0	2143	1574	136.1	72	2018 finals
2	West Coast (P)	22	16	6	0	2012	1657	121.4	64	2018 finals
3	Collingwood	22	15	7	0	2046	1699	120.4	60	2018 finals
4	Hawthorn	22	15	7	0	1972	1642	120.1	60	2018 finals
5	Melbourne	22	14	8	0	2299	1749	131.4	56	2018 finals
6	Sydney	22	14	8	0	1822	1664	109.5	56	2018 finals
7	Greater Western Sydney	22	13	8	1	1898	1661	114.3	54	2018 finals
8	Geelong	22	13	9	0	2045	1554	131.6	52	2018 finals
9	North Melbourne	22	12	10	0	1950	1790	108.9	48	
10	Port Adelaide	22	12	10	0	1780	1654	107.6	48	
11	Essendon	22	12	10	0	1932	1838	105.1	48	
12	Adelaide	22	12	10	0	1941	1865	104.1	48	
13	Western Bulldogs	22	8	14	0	1575	2037	77.3	32	
14	Fremantle	22	8	14	0	1556	2041	76.2	32	
15	Brisbane Lions	22	5	17	0	1825	2049	89.1	20	
16	St Kilda	22	4	17	1	1606	2125	75.6	18	
17	Gold Coast	22	4	18	0	1308	2182	59.9	16	
18	Carlton	22	2	20	0	1353	2282	59.3	8	

Source: AFL
Rules for classification: 1) points; 2) percentage; 3) number of points for.
(P) Premiers

== Awards ==
West Coast had four players in the 2018 All-Australian team. They were Andrew Gaff, Shannon Hurn, Jeremy McGovern and Elliot Yeo.
