= 2020 West Coast Eagles season =

West Coast Eagles
2020 season
- Coach: Adam Simpson (7th season)
- Captains: Luke Shuey (1st season)
- Home ground: Optus Stadium
- AFL season: 5th
- Best and Fairest: Nic Naitanui
- Leading goalkicker: Josh Kennedy (34)
- Highest home attendance: 32,865 vs. Collingwood (Elimination Final)
- Lowest home attendance: 0 vs. Melbourne (Round 1)
- Club membership: 100,776

The West Coast Eagles are an Australian rules football team based in Perth, Western Australia. Their 2020 season was their 34th season in the Australian Football League (AFL), their seventh season under premiership coach Adam Simpson, and the first season with Luke Shuey as captain. The West Coast Eagles finished the season with 12 wins and 5 losses, placing them fifth on the ladder, qualifying for the 2020 AFL finals series, in which they were eliminated in the first round by eighth-placed Collingwood. The COVID-19 pandemic had a significant impact on their season, with the team forced to hub in Queensland for much of the season due to restrictions on travelling to Western Australia from other states.

Nic Naitanui was West Coast's best and fairest player, winning the John Worsfold Medal. Previously his highest place for the medal was fifth, in 2010. Josh Kennedy, who kicked 34 goals was the club's leading goal-scorer for the seventh time in his career. Naitanui, Liam Ryan and Brad Sheppard were selected for the 2020 All-Australian team.

2020 was the first year for West Coast in the AFL Women's competition, in which they finished seventh. In addition, West Coast withdrew from the West Australian Football League competition in 2020 due to COVID-19 after fielding a team for the first time in 2019.

== Background ==
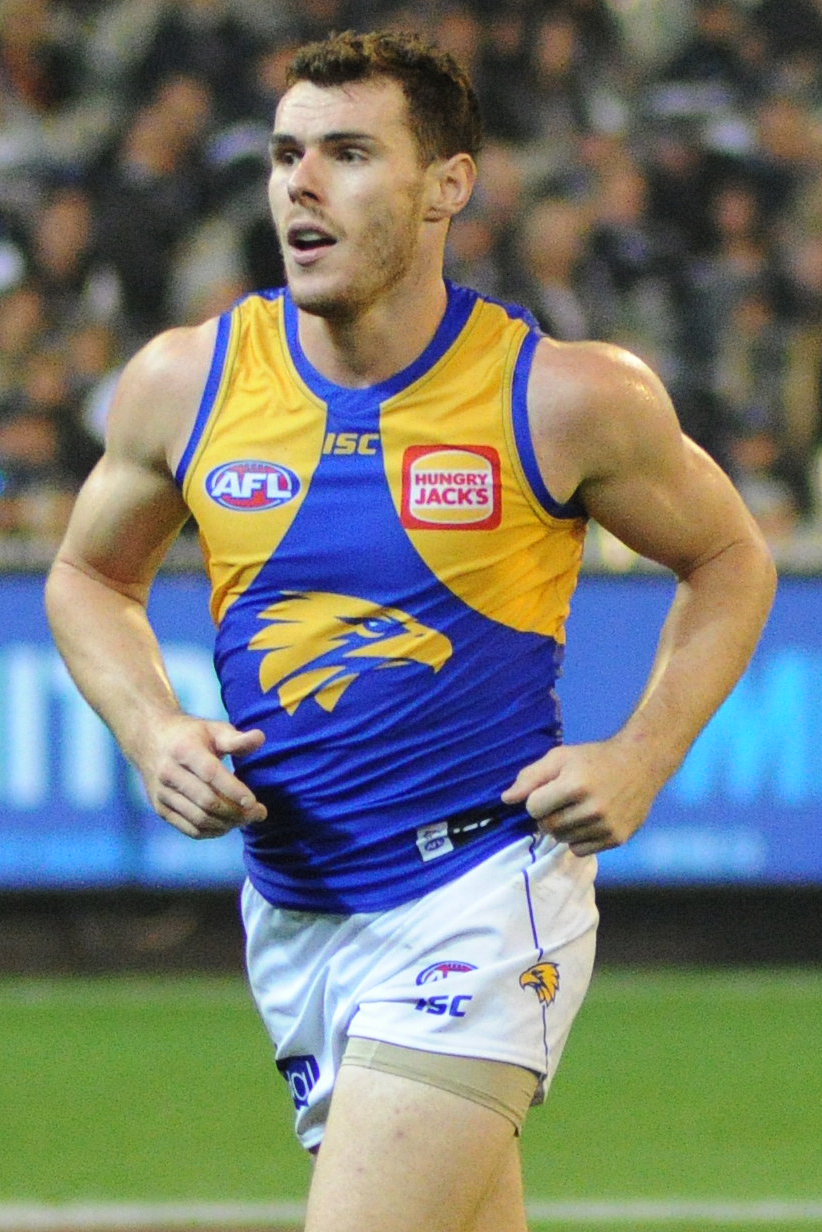
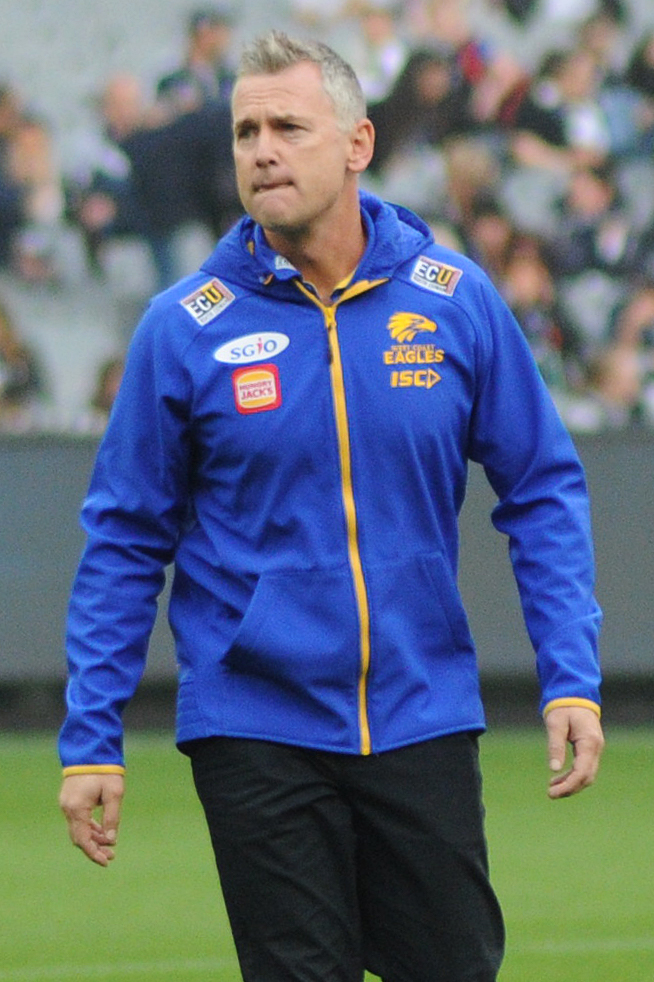
Luke Shuey (captain) and Adam Simpson (coach)

The West Coast Eagles are an Australian rules football team based in Perth, Western Australia, that competes in the Australian Football League (AFL). They ended the 2019 home-and-away season fifth on the ladder after spending the majority of the season in the top four. Their season ended after being beaten by Geelong in the semi-finals.

In December 2019, Luke Shuey was named captain of the West Coast Eagles, after Shannon Hurn stepped down from the role. Josh Kennedy remained one of the vice-captains, joined by Jeremy McGovern, who replaced Luke Shuey. Jack Darling, Andrew Gaff, Nic Naitanui and Elliot Yeo rounded out the leadership group.

Adam Simpson was head coach for a seventh season. Some of the assistant coaches changed roles; Jaymie Graham swapped from the forward line to the backline, Luke Webster swapped from the WAFL coach to the forwards coach, and Daniel Pratt swapped from backs to stoppages coach. Nathan van Berlo retained his position as midfield coach. The development coaches were Gavin Bell (head of development), Chance Bateman (forwards), Matt Rosa (midfield) and Mark Nicoski (backs).

In February 2020, as part of West Coast's overall rebrand over the past few years, they released a new version of their club song. The song, which contains a didgeridoo and clapstick intro was written, composed and produced by Ian Berney, and sung by Ian Kenny, both from Perth band Birds of Tokyo.

West Coast's major sponsors for 2020 were fast food outlet Hungry Jack's and online mortgage broker Lendi. The club had 100,776 members in 2020, an 11.4% increase on 2019 membership numbers, despite the COVID-19 pandemic. The membership was the highest in the AFL, the first time this happened to a club outside of Victoria.

== Playing list ==
=== 2019 off-season changes ===
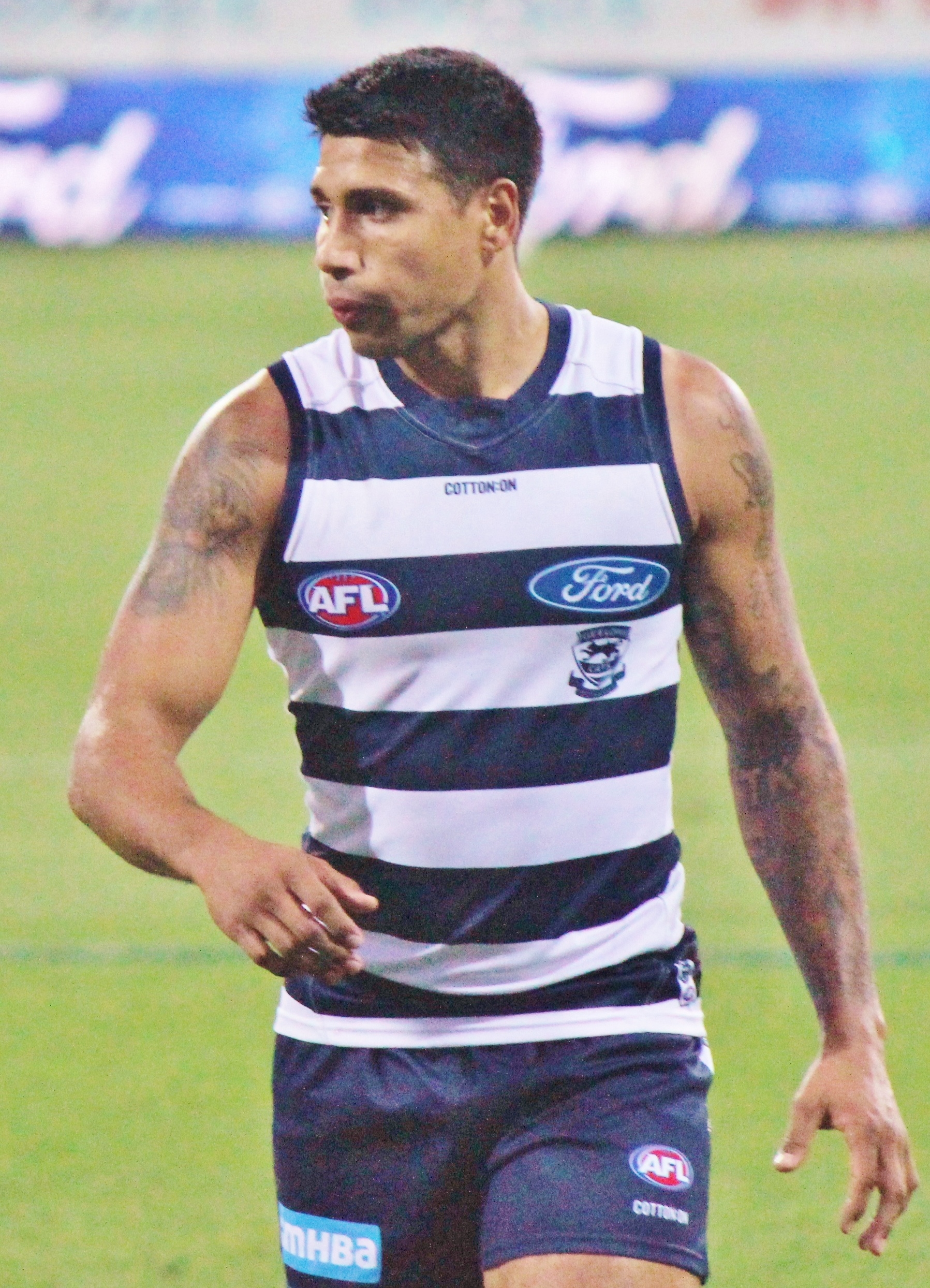
Tim Kelly joined West Coast in the off-season trade period from Geelong

At the end of their 2019 season, West Coast delisted premiership eagle Chris Masten, Fraser McInnes, Kurt Mutimer and Matthew Allen. In addition, Brodie Riach, Patrick Bines, Keegan Brooksby and Josh Smith from the rookie list were delisted. (Note: Delisting of Chris Masten. Delisting of Keegan Brooksby, Kurt Mutimer and Matthew Allen. Delisting of Fraser McInnes, Brodie Riach and Patrick Bines. Delisting of Josh Smith.) Brendon Ah Chee and Hamish Brayshaw were also delisted from the primary list, with the Eagles citing it as preparation for the draft. Ah Chee and Brayshaw were later drafted in the 2020 rookie draft.

West Coast's only trade in the 2019 trade period involved receiving Tim Kelly and a 2020 third round pick from Geelong, and pick 52 from Essendon, in exchange for picks 14, 24 and a 2020 first round pick going to Geelong, pick 33 going to Essendon, and Essendon and Geelong exchanging pick 37 and 57. The trade came after Kelly was overlooked by West Coast as a draft pick for five years, instead being drafted by Geelong, where he played the 2018 and 2019 seasons. The trade occurred due to Kelly's desire to return to Western Australia, having previously wanted to trade in the 2018 trade period. Kelly signed a six-year deal with West Coast, worth approximately $5 million.

In the 2019 national draft, Callum Jamieson (pick 49) and Ben Johnson (pick 58) were drafted, both of whom are from Western Australia. Francis Watson was elevated from the rookie list, signing on for another year. Anthony Treacy (pick 11), Mitch O'Neill (pick 25), Brendon Ah Chee (pick 33) and Hamish Brayshaw (pick 39) were drafted in the 2020 rookie draft. Nic Reid and Jamaine Jones were added to the rookie list in the supplementary selection period. Jamaine Jones previously played for Geelong in 2018 and 2019, but was delisted at the end of that year.

Removals from playing list
Player	Reason	Games played	Ref.
Chris Masten	Delisted	215	
Fraser McInnes	Delisted	14	
Brodie Riach	Delisted	0	
Patrick Bines	Delisted	0	
Kurt Mutimer	Delisted	4	
Matthew Allen	Delisted	0	
Keegan Brooksby	Delisted	14 (0 at West Coast)	
Josh Smith	Delisted	34 (2 at West Coast)	
Hamish Brayshaw	Delisted (Note: Hamish Brayshaw and Brendon Ah Chee were later drafted in the 2020 rookie draft.)	0	
Brendon Ah Chee	Delisted	36 (9 at West Coast)	

Additions to playing list
Player	Acquired	Former club	Former league	Ref.
Tim Kelly	Traded from Geelong	Geelong	AFL	
Callum Jamieson	No. 49, 2019 national draft	Claremont	WAFL	
Ben Johnson	No. 58, 2019 national draft	West Perth	WAFL	
Francis Watson	Rookie elevation	West Coast	AFL	
Anthony Treacy	No. 11, 2020 rookie draft	Claremont	WAFL	
Mitch O'Neill	No. 25, 2020 rookie draft	Tasmanian Devils	NAB League	
Brendon Ah Chee	No. 33, 2020 rookie draft	West Coast	AFL	
Hamish Brayshaw	No. 39, 2020 rookie draft	West Coast	AFL	
Nic Reid	Supplementary selection period	West Coast	WAFL	
Jamaine Jones	Supplementary selection period	Geelong	AFL	

=== Statistics ===
West Coast used 37 players from the 45 on its playing list, six of which were debutants. They were Harry Edwards (round 9), Nic Reid (round 12), Xavier O'Neill (round 13), Bailey Williams (round 14), Hamish Brayshaw (round 17) and Luke Foley (round 18). Tim Kelly (round 1) and Jamaine Jones (round 4) also played their first games for West Coast, after having previously played for Geelong. Six players played every match of the season. They were Tom Barrass, Jack Darling, Andrew Gaff, Tim Kelly, Liam Ryan and Brad Sheppard.

In February 2020, Daniel Venables was ruled out for the entire 2020 season due to concussion as a result of a head knock he suffered in round nine of 2019. Willie Rioli also did not play at all during the 2020 season, having been provisionally suspended for the entire season due to allegedly tampering with two urine tests in August and September 2019. He was eventually sentenced in March 2021 to a two year backdated suspension, starting in August 2019.

Playing list and statistics
Player	No.	Games	Goals	Behinds	Kicks	Handballs	Disposals	Marks	Tackles	Notes/Milestone(s)
Liam Ryan	1	18	26	16	140	54	194	66	32	
Jake Waterman	2	10	9	2	78	25	103	51	8	
Andrew Gaff	3	18	5	4	251	186	437	81	42	200th AFL game (round 3)
Dom Sheed	4	17	8	3	172	164	336	55	40	
Brad Sheppard	5	18	2	0	194	92	286	112	34	
Elliot Yeo	6	10	0	1	107	85	192	22	56	
Jack Redden	8	13	1	1	98	106	204	44	31	
Nic Naitanui	9	17	5	4	109	83	192	13	40	
Jarrod Brander	10	8	0	1	67	22	89	36	12	
Tim Kelly	11	18	5	4	208	153	361	46	75	West Coast debut (round 1)
Oscar Allen	12	15	18	8	86	46	132	44	41	
Luke Shuey	13	13	1	1	144	102	246	33	45	
Liam Duggan	14	17	0	2	211	70	281	98	31	
Jamie Cripps	15	14	9	7	94	73	167	36	45	
Tom Hickey	16	3	0	0	6	10	16	5	3	
Josh Kennedy	17	17	34	22	96	23	119	69	16	250th AFL game (round 7)
Daniel Venables	18	0	—N/a	—N/a	—N/a	—N/a	—N/a	—N/a	—N/a	Long-term injury (concussion)
Nathan Vardy	19	0	—N/a	—N/a	—N/a	—N/a	—N/a	—N/a	—N/a	
Jeremy Mcgovern	20	12	0	0	114	43	157	72	14	
Jack Petruccelle	21	6	2	5	22	20	42	9	7	
Hamish Brayshaw	22	1	0	1	3	2	5	1	1	Rookie, AFL debut (round 17)
Lewis Jetta	23	6	1	2	62	24	86	22	16	200th AFL game (round 4)
Xavier O'Neill	24	5	1	1	25	24	49	9	9	AFL debut (round 13)
Shannon Hurn	25	17	0	0	205	66	271	87	26	
Francis Watson	26	0	—N/a	—N/a	—N/a	—N/a	—N/a	—N/a	—N/a	
Jack Darling	27	18	30	12	112	57	169	64	35	200th AFL game (round 4)
Tom Cole	28	15	3	0	95	62	157	48	30	
Luke Foley	29	1	0	0	3	0	3	2	1	AFL debut (round 18)
Jackson Nelson	30	15	0	0	150	54	204	61	31	
Will Schofield	31	4	0	0	12	10	22	3	8	
Bailey Williams	32	3	1	1	10	11	21	5	5	AFL debut (round 14)
Brayden Ainsworth	33	9	3	1	44	33	77	26	12	
Mark Hutchings	34	3	0	0	15	9	24	5	4	
Josh Rotham	35	10	0	0	90	17	107	52	13	
Tom Barrass	37	18	0	0	144	37	181	94	4	
Ben Johnson	38	0	—N/a	—N/a	—N/a	—N/a	—N/a	—N/a	—N/a	
Jarrod Cameron	39	5	2	1	16	8	24	5	11	
Callum Jamieson	40	0	—N/a	—N/a	—N/a	—N/a	—N/a	—N/a	—N/a	
Brendon Ah Chee	41	16	6	5	77	78	155	36	26	Rookie
Harry Edwards	42	1	0	0	2	1	3	0	0	Rookie, AFL debut (round 9)
Anthony Treacy	43	0	—N/a	—N/a	—N/a	—N/a	—N/a	—N/a	—N/a	Rookie
Willie Rioli	44	0	—N/a	—N/a	—N/a	—N/a	—N/a	—N/a	—N/a	Did not play due to ASADA investigation
Mitch O'Neill	45	0	—N/a	—N/a	—N/a	—N/a	—N/a	—N/a	—N/a	Rookie
Nic Reid	46	3	1	1	8	13	21	1	8	Rookie, AFL debut (round 12)
Jamaine Jones	47	2	0	1	13	8	21	5	8	Rookie, West Coast debut (round 4)

== Season summary ==
The original fixture for the 2020 season was revealed by the AFL in October 2019. West Coast would have played 22 matches, facing Collingwood, Fremantle, Geelong, Richmond and Port Adelaide twice, and all other teams once. As part of their pre-season, West Coast faced Essendon and Fremantle in the Marsh Community Series, ending up beaten by both teams. The match against Essendon was originally scheduled for 28 February, but it was rescheduled to the day prior so that it did not occur at the same time as the State of Origin for Bushfire Relief Match.

West Coast played their first game of the regular season on 22 March against Melbourne at Optus Stadium. Melbourne were soundly beaten by 27 points in that match, which was Tim Kelly's first game for the Eagles. The match was played with no spectators present, and occurred just hours after AFL chief executive Gillon McLachlan announced that the 2020 AFL season would be suspended until at least the start of June, due to restrictions on interstate travel caused by the COVID-19 pandemic. The Eagles' round 1 match would be the last AFL match to be played for over two months.

On 25 May, the AFL revealed the revised fixtures for rounds 2 to 5. West Coast were to go into a hub on the Gold Coast for at least four weeks, completing matches only in Queensland for that time. On 8 June, the West Coast team arrived at the Royal Pines Resort on the Gold Coast. Their first match after the AFL season continuing was against Gold Coast at Metricon Stadium, on 13 June. The Suns thrashed the Eagles by 44 points in an upset, giving the 2019 wooden spooners their first win in 426 days. In round 3, West Coast played the Brisbane Lions at the Gabba, in which the Lions beat West Coast by 30 points. That was West Coast's first match with crowds attending, with 1,965 spectators at the game. West Coast then played Port Adelaide, the eventual minor premiers at Metricon Stadium, in which the Eagles were beaten 13.11 (89) to 6.5 (41). That game making it three losses in a row for the Eagles, continuing their horror run in the Queensland hub and placing them 16th on the AFL ladder. Jamaine Jones made his West Coast debut that game, and Will Schofield was suspended for one match after headbutting Zak Butters.

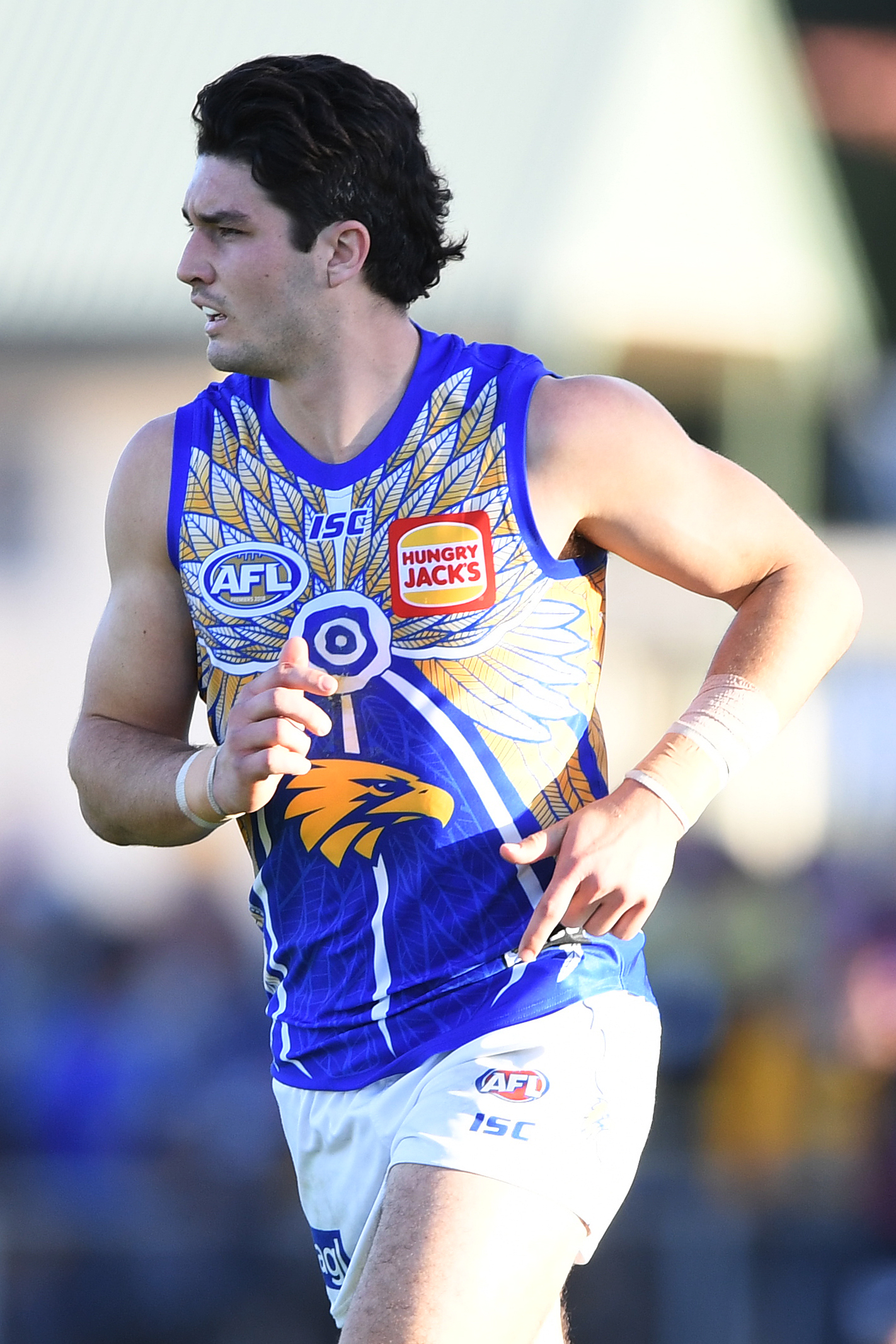
Tom Barrass took Mark of the Year contenders in rounds 5 and 6

West Coast were scheduled to play Richmond on round 5, but due to Queensland's latest quarantine requirements, West Coast would have had to quarantine for 14 days following a match against a Victorian side. This resulted in the Eagles playing Sydney instead, at Metricon Stadium. West Coast got their first win in the Queensland hub against Sydney, beating them by 30 points. Tom Barrass took a mark of the year contender, and Luke Shuey injured his hamstring, causing him to miss two games. The following round, West Coast beat the winless Adelaide by 33 points at the Gabba, in their last game in Queensland before heading home for 7 weeks. During the week prior, Crows ruckman Reilly O'Brien accidentally tweeted that Nic Naitanui was "lazy and unfit", among other notes about the Eagles ruckman. This incident gained notoriety in the days surrounding the round 6 match.

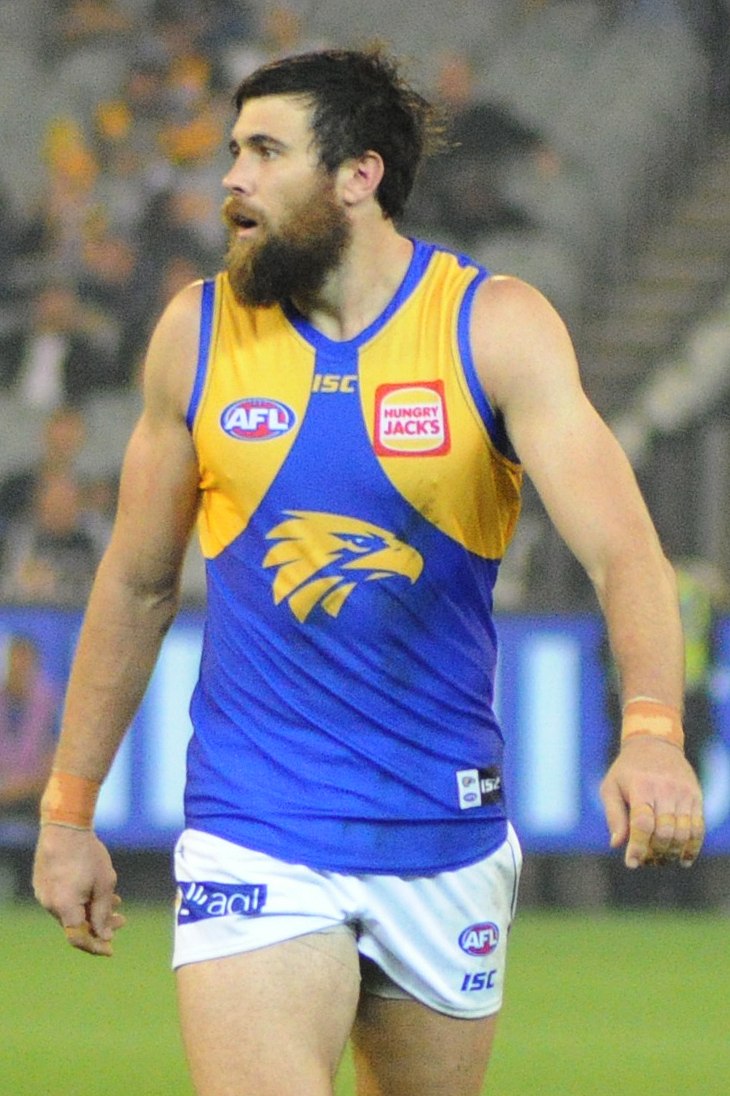
Josh Kennedy kicked the most goals for West Coast, with 34, finishing 3rd in the Coleman Medal.

West Coast's first game at Optus Stadium since round 1 was a Western Derby against Fremantle. The Eagles won 9.8 (62) to 5.2 (32), giving them the longest ever Western Derby winning streak, with 10 wins in a row against Fremantle. Josh Kennedy on his 250th AFL game won the Glendinning–Allan Medal. The game had the largest crowd of any Australian sporting event since the start of the COVID-19 pandemic. In round 8, West Coast beat Collingwood by 66 points. West Coast's 18.3 (111) was the largest score of the season at the time, against Collingwood's 6.9 (45). Josh Kennedy kicked 7 goals in the match. The next round, West Coast beat Geelong by 9 points, putting West Coast fourth on the ladder. The Eagles were behind by 21 points during the 3rd quarter, but were able to make a comeback. Josh Kennedy kicked 4 goals, putting him first in the Coleman Medal race. In round 10, West Coast had a bye.

Following the bye, West Coast had three more games in a row at Optus Stadium, of which they won all three. The games were against Carlton, with a margin of 22, Hawthorn, with a margin of 32, and Greater Western Sydney, with a margin of 12. Elliot Yeo developed a groin injury against Carlton, resulting in him missing the rest of the season. At the end of those three rounds, West Coast had the longest winning streak of the season, with eight wins in a row, and were fourth on the ladder. The round 13 Greater Western Sydney match was the first match in a series of five for West Coast over 19 days, from 23 August to 10 September. On 25 August, the team flew over to Queensland for their second hub in that state. The Eagles stayed Sanctuary Cove resort, on the Gold Coast for their hub.

West Coast's first match in their second Queensland hub was against Richmond at Metricon Stadium on Thursday, 27 August. Richmond beat West Coast by 27 points, ending their eight game winning streak. Josh Kennedy received a concussion, causing him to miss out on most of the Richmond game and West Coast's next game. The following Tuesday, West Coast faced Essendon, beating them by 15 points, with Liam Ryan kicking four goals. In round 16, after West Coast's second 5 day break in a row, they faced Western Bulldogs, who beat the Eagles in an upset. The margin was 2 points, and the result eventually caused West Coast to miss the top four.

West Coast were forced to make 6 player changes for their round 17 game against St Kilda, due to injuries. At the time, Brendon Ah Chee, Mark Hutchings, Lewis Jetta, Jack Redden, Dom Sheed, Luke Shuey and Elliot Yeo were injured, and Jamie Cripps couldn't be selected for personal reasons. Despite this, the Eagles won against St Kilda by 15 points, guaranteeing them a finals spot, however Jeremy McGovern injured his hamstring, leaving him out for the final match of the home-and-away season, against North Melbourne. West Coast won their round 18 match against North Melbourne by 15 points, giving them a small chance of a top 4 finish, but neither Richmond or Geelong lost their matches, causing West Coast to finish 5th at the end of the season, setting them up for an elimination final against Collingwood.

West Coast's elimination final against Collingwood occurred on Saturday, 3 October. The Eagles went into the match as favourites, due to having beat the Magpies by 66 points earlier in the season, having won all games at home during the home-and-away season, and being higher on the ladder than the Magpies. However, after several lead changes in the match, Collingwood ended up winning the elimination final by 1 point, ending West Coast's 2020 season. This was the first year since 2016 where West Coast did not progress beyond the first week of the finals.

=== Results ===
Marsh Community Series results
Game	Day	Date	Result	Score			Opponent	Score			Ground	Attendance
Game	Day	Date	Result	G	B	T	Opponent	G	B	T	Ground	Attendance
1	Thursday	27 February	Lost	13	9	87	Essendon	14	11	95	Mineral Resources Park	4,302
2	Saturday	7 March	Lost	7	12	54	Fremantle	8	7	55	HBF Arena	10,384

Regular season results
Round	Day	Date	Result	Score			Opponent	Score			Ground		Attendance	Ladder
Round	Day	Date	Result	G	B	T	Opponent	G	B	T	Ground		Attendance	Ladder
1	Sunday	22 March	Won	12	6	78	Melbourne	7	9	51	Optus Stadium	H	0	3rd
2	Saturday	13 June	Lost	6	10	46	Gold Coast	14	6	90	Metricon Stadium	A	0	12th
3	Saturday	20 June	Lost	6	8	44	Brisbane Lions	10	14	74	Gabba	A	1,965	15th
4	Saturday	27 June	Lost	6	5	41	Port Adelaide	13	11	89	Metricon Stadium	A	450	16th
5	Saturday	4 July	Won	11	11	77	Sydney	6	7	43	Metricon Stadium	H	2,238	15th
6	Saturday	11 July	Won	10	7	67	Adelaide	5	4	34	Gabba	H	210	11th
7	Sunday	19 July	Won	9	8	62	Fremantle	5	2	32	Optus Stadium	A	25,306	8th
8	Sunday	26 July	Won	18	3	111	Collingwood	6	9	45	Optus Stadium	H	24,824	5th
9	Saturday	1 August	Won	11	7	73	Geelong	10	4	64	Optus Stadium	H	26,211	4th
10	Bye													6th
11	Sunday	9 August	Won	11	6	72	Carlton	7	8	50	Optus Stadium	H	19,092	4th
12	Sunday	16 August	Won	12	9	81	Hawthorn	7	7	49	Optus Stadium	H	22,780	4th
13	Sunday	23 August	Won	9	7	61	Greater Western Sydney	7	7	49	Optus Stadium	H	27,339	4th
14	Thursday	27 August	Lost	9	7	61	Richmond	14	4	88	Metricon Stadium	A	3,628	5th
15	Tuesday	1 September	Won	9	6	60	Essendon	6	9	45	Gabba	H	1,932	5th
16	Sunday	6 September	Lost	7	5	47	Western Bulldogs	6	13	49	Metricon Stadium	A	532	5th
17	Thursday	10 September	Won	9	11	65	St Kilda	6	14	50	Gabba	A	1,925	5th
18	Thursday	17 September	Won	7	7	49	North Melbourne	4	10	34	Metricon Stadium	A	724	5th
EF	Saturday	3 October	Lost	11	9	75	Collingwood	12	4	76	Optus Stadium	H	32,865	—N/a

Key
H	Home game
A	Away game
EF	Elimination final

=== Ladder ===
Pos	Team	Pld	W	L	D	PF	PA	PP	Pts	Qualification
1	Port Adelaide	17	14	3	0	1185	869	136.4	56	Finals series
2	Brisbane Lions	17	14	3	0	1184	948	124.9	56	Finals series
3	Richmond (P)	17	12	4	1	1135	874	129.9	50	Finals series
4	Geelong	17	12	5	0	1233	901	136.8	48	Finals series
5	West Coast	17	12	5	0	1095	936	117.0	48	Finals series
6	St Kilda	17	10	7	0	1159	997	116.2	40	Finals series
7	Western Bulldogs	17	10	7	0	1103	1034	106.7	40	Finals series
8	Collingwood	17	9	7	1	965	881	109.5	38	Finals series
9	Melbourne	17	9	8	0	1063	986	107.8	36	
10	Greater Western Sydney	17	8	9	0	1007	1053	95.6	32	
11	Carlton	17	7	10	0	1017	1078	94.3	28	
12	Fremantle	17	7	10	0	866	924	93.7	28	
13	Essendon	17	6	10	1	938	1185	79.2	26	
14	Gold Coast	17	5	11	1	996	1099	90.6	22	
15	Hawthorn	17	5	12	0	1004	1194	84.1	20	
16	Sydney	17	5	12	0	890	1077	82.6	20	
17	North Melbourne	17	3	14	0	858	1205	71.2	12	
18	Adelaide	17	3	14	0	826	1283	64.4	12	

Source: AFL
Rules for classification: 1) points; 2) percentage; 3) number of points for.
(P) Premiers

== Impact of COVID-19 ==
During the week prior to the 2020 season starting, the AFL announced that the season would be shorted from 22 matches per team to 17 matches per team, with each team playing each other once. This meant 2020 was the first year where only one Western Derby took place. At the time, the AFL said the first four rounds of the season would remain as previously fixtured, with the remaining rounds to be refixtured. It also announced that there would not be any spectators at games for the first time in the league's history, and that each quarter would be only 16 minutes long, to facilitate shortening the breaks between each game. Round 1 went ahead as originally fixtured, however the AFL announced on the Sunday of round 1 that the league would be postponed until at least the start of June. The remaining matches of round 1 occurred, including the West Coast match, but no more matches occurred for over two months.

On 12 May 2020, the AFL ruled that AFL players are not allowed to play in state leagues as part of strict protocols implemented due to COVID-19. This resulted in West Coast withdrawing from the West Australian Football League for 2020. Western Australia's COVID-19 border restrictions meant that any travellers from interstate would have to quarantine for 14 days. This made it impractical to hold AFL matches in Perth. In order to get the season back up and running, West Coast stayed in a hub on the Gold Coast for five weeks, playing matches at Metricon Stadium and the Gabba. The season resumed on 11 June. From round 3 onwards, matches in Queensland were allowed to have small crowds.

From rounds 7 to 13, West Coast were back in Perth, playing consecutive games at Optus Stadium. To get around the interstate travel quarantine requirement, two interstate teams would go to Western Australia, and play each other for their first week in the state, under strict quarantine while doing so. After the 14 day quarantine period, then they played West Coast and Fremantle, before heading over east again. The first two teams to do this were Collingwood and Geelong, followed by Carlton and Hawthorn, and finally Sydney and Greater Western Sydney. Initially Optus Stadium was meant to be at its full capacity of 60,000 spectators, but the Western Australian government restricted it to 30,000 spectators after a spike in virus numbers in Victoria. Due to West Coast having already played Sydney, they flew back over to Queensland after playing Greater Western Sydney for a second hub on the Gold Coast.

West Coast played their remaining six matches of the home-and-away season at Metricon Stadium and the Gabba. Rounds 13 through to 17 were condensed in order for the season to finish sooner. This resulted in the Eagles playing five matches over 19 days. West Coast negotiated with North Melbourne to buy the rights from them to host their round 18 game in Perth. The deal would have meant West Coast pay North Melbourne between $700,000 and $800,000, however the AFL did not allow that deal to go ahead. The match was played at North Melbourne's preferred ground of Metricon Stadium.

West Coast went back home for their preliminary final against Collingwood, which they hosted at Optus Stadium. Prior to the match, West Coast quarantined in Perth for 14 days, and Collingwood quarantined for 7 days. Due to the Magpies' short quarantine period, it was initially believed that the Eagles would have to quarantine for 14 days if they lost, but it was later confirmed that they would quarantine for 7 days. The Western Australian government increased the allowed capacity of the stadium to 35,000, including staff and officials, meaning that approximately 33,000 spectators were allowed to attend the game.

== Awards ==
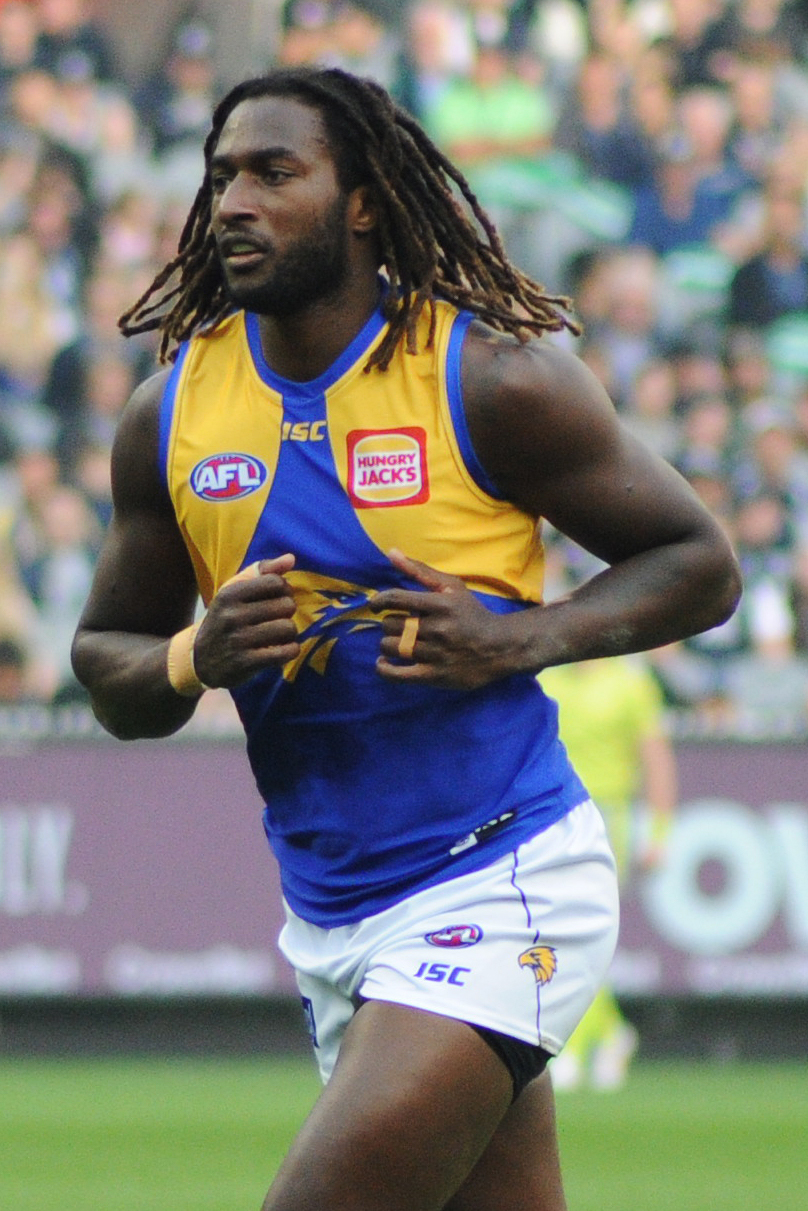
Nic Naitanui won the 2020 John Worsfold Medal

Nic Naitanui, Liam Ryan and Brad Sheppard were all selected in the 2020 All-Australian team. Andrew Gaff was in the 40-man initial squad but was not selected for the final team. West Coast had the equal highest number of players in the 2020 All-Australian team that year, with three. 2020 was the first time Liam Ryan and Brad Sheppard were selected in the All-Australian team, and the second time Nic Naitanui was selected.

West Coast held its awards night on 19 October at the Crown Perth Grand Ballroom. Nic Naitanui won the John Worsfold Medal with 194 votes. Behind him was Andrew Gaff (192), Brad Sheppard (163), Tom Barrass (154) and Liam Duggan (152). This was Naitanui's first John Worsfold Medal, and the second time a ruckman won the award. His previous highest place for the medal was fifth, in 2010. Other awards presented on the night were the Chris Mainwaring Medal for Best Clubman, awarded to Brad Sheppard; Emerging Talent, awarded to Josh Rotham; Player of the finals, awarded to Nic Naitanui; and Leading Goalkicker, awarded to Josh Kennedy. Jamie Cripps, who played his 150th game for the club in 2020 was awarded life membership of the West Coast Eagles, along with former eagles Eric Mackenzie and Beau Waters, and former club chairman Alan Cransberg.

Awards received by West Coast players
Award	Awarded by	Player	Result	Ref.
All-Australian team	Australian Football League	Andrew Gaff	Shortlisted	
All-Australian team	Australian Football League	Nic Naitanui	Selected	
All-Australian team	Australian Football League	Liam Ryan	Selected	
All-Australian team	Australian Football League	Brad Sheppard	Selected	
Mark of the Year	Australian Football League	Tom Barrass (round 5 and round 6)	Shortlisted	
Mark of the Year	Australian Football League	Jeremy McGovern (round 13)	Shortlisted	
Mark of the Year	Australian Football League	Liam Ryan (round 8)	Shortlisted	
Leigh Matthews Trophy for Most Valuable Player	AFL Players Association	Nic Naitanui	Nominated	
Leigh Matthews Trophy for Most Valuable Player	AFL Players Association	Liam Ryan	Nominated	
Leigh Matthews Trophy for Most Valuable Player	AFL Players Association	Brad Sheppard	Nominated	
Best Captain	AFL Players Association	Luke Shuey	Nominated	
Robert Rose Award for Most Courageous Player	AFL Players Association	Liam Duggan	Nominated	
Best First Year Player	AFL Players Association	Nic Reid	Nominated	
John Worsfold Medal	West Coast Eagles	Nic Naitanui	Won	
Chris Mainwaring Medal for Best Clubman	West Coast Eagles	Brad Sheppard	Won	
Emerging Talent	West Coast Eagles	Josh Rotham	Won	
Player of the Finals	West Coast Eagles	Nic Naitanui	Won	
Leading Goalkicker	West Coast Eagles	Josh Kennedy	Won	

== See also ==
- 2020 West Coast Eagles women's season
