= 2014 West Coast Eagles season =

West Coast Eagles
2014 season
- Coach: Adam Simpson
- Captains: Darren Glass (to rd. 12) Five co-captains Shannon Hurn; Josh Kennedy; Eric Mackenzie; Matt Priddis; Scott Selwood
- Home ground: Patersons Stadium
- AFL season: 9th
- Best & fairest: Eric Mackenzie
- Leading goalkicker: Josh Kennedy (61)
- Highest home attendance: 40,476 (v Fremantle, rd 7)
- Lowest home attendance: 25,076 (v Sydney, rd 16)
- Average home attendance: 34,198

The 2014 season was the West Coast Eagles' 28th season in the Australian Football League (AFL), the premier Australian rules football competition. The 2014 season also marks the first season of the club's reserves affiliation with the East Perth Football Club in the West Australian Football League (WAFL). West Coast finished thirteenth in the previous season, despite having made the finals in the two preceding seasons. At the end of the 2013 season, previous coach John Worsfold retired, after twelve seasons in the position, and was replaced by Adam Simpson, who had not coached previously at AFL level. Darren Glass was retained as captain for a seventh season, with Josh Kennedy and Scott Selwood as vice-captains. However, Glass retired from football after round 12, and was replaced by five acting co-captains: Shannon Hurn, Kennedy, Eric Mackenzie, Matt Priddis, and Selwood. Undefeated in the 2014 pre-season competition (which used a different format to previous years), West Coast started its season against the Western Bulldogs on 23 March. The club failed to qualify for the 2014 finals series, finishing its season in ninth place, with 11 wins and 11 losses. Priddis won the highest individual award, the Brownlow Medal, Beau Waters won the Jim Stynes Community Leadership Award, and Mackenzie was the club champion winning the John Worsfold Medal. No players from West Coast were selected on the All-Australian team.

== Squad and leadership group ==
Darren Glass was initially named captain of the West Coast Eagles for a seventh season, having taken over from Chris Judd from the 2008 season. Scott Selwood and Josh Kennedy were named vice-captains, while Dean Cox and Matt Priddis were also named to the leadership group. Beau Waters, who had been sole vice-captain for the 2012 and 2013 seasons, stepped down from the role to concentrate on his recovery from persistent shoulder injuries. Leadership positions were voted on by the playing group as a whole, and confirmed by the senior coach, the match committee, and the board. Darren Glass announced his retirement from football prior to round 13 of the season. Five players were named acting co-captains for the remainder of the season: Shannon Hurn, Josh Kennedy, Eric Mackenzie, Matt Priddis, and Scott Selwood.

- 1 Mitch Brown
- 2 Mark LeCras
- 3 Andrew Gaff
- 4 Dom Sheed
- 5 Brad Sheppard
- 6 Elliot Yeo
- 7 Chris Masten
- 8 Beau Waters
- 9 Nic Naitanui
- 10 Scott Selwood (v/c to rd. 12; c/c from rd. 13)
- 11 Matt Priddis (c/c from rd. 13)
- 12 Sharrod Wellingham
- 13 Luke Shuey
- 14 Jacob Brennan
- 15 Jamie Cripps
- 16 Eric MacKenzie (c/c from rd. 13)
- 17 Josh Kennedy (v/c to rd. 12; c/c from rd. 13)
- 18 Xavier Ellis
- 19 Adam Carter
- 20 Dean Cox
- 21 Brant Colledge
- 23 Darren Glass (ret.; c. to rd. 12)
- 24 Matt Rosa
- 25 Shannon Hurn (c/c from rd. 13)
- 26 Sam Butler
- 27 Jack Darling
- 28 Ashley Smith
- 29 Scott Lycett
- 30 Blayne Wilson
- 31 Will Schofield
- 32 Simon Tunbridge
- 34 Mark Hutchings
- 35 Patrick McGinnity
- 36 Fraser McInnes
- 37 Tom Barrass
- 39 Malcolm Karpany
- 40 Dylan Main
- 42 Jeremy McGovern
- 44 Jamie Bennell

Rookies:

- 22 Callum Sinclair
- 38 Murray Newman
- 41 Will Maginness
- 43 Rowen Powell

== Pre-season ==
=== List changes and coaching changes ===
West Coast delisted Bradd Dalziell and Cale Morton at the end of the 2013 season. Murray Newman was also delisted, but was redrafted by the club with pick 38 in the 2014 Rookie Draft. Brad Dick, Andrew Embley, Ashton Hams, Daniel Kerr, Mark Nicoski, and Adam Selwood all retired from AFL football at various stages during and after the season. During the trade period, Hawthorn player Xavier Ellis joined West Coast on a one-year contract as an unrestricted free agent. Midway through the season, in August 2014, West Coast signed former professional baseball player Corey Adamson, adding him to the rookie list under the three-year non-registered rule, which allows clubs to recruit players who have not been registered with an AFL-affiliated competition. He had previously played underage representative football for Western Australia.

The club's longest-serving senior coach, John Worsfold, resigned on 5 September 2013, after twelve seasons in the position. A number of candidates interviewed for the position, notably West Coast assistant Scott Burns, Hawthorn assistant Adam Simpson, Fremantle assistant Peter Sumich, and Sydney assistant Leigh Tudor. Simpson and Sumich, who had previously been an assistant under Worsfold, progressed to the final interview before the club's board, with Simpson announced as the club's new coach on 3 October 2013. A number of other coaching staff also left the club at the end of the 2013 season, though their departures were unrelated. Assistants Scott Burns and David Teague left to join Collingwood and St Kilda, respectively, while strategy coach Phil Walsh left to fill the same position at Port Adelaide, and was replaced by Don Pyke. After Adam Simpon's appointment as senior coach, former North Melbourne player Brady Rawlings and former Geelong and Carlton player Adrian Hickmott were made assistant coaches, joining Justin Longmuir. Two previous West Coast players, Adam Selwood and Jaymie Graham, and another former North Melbourne player, Daniel Pratt, were also appointed to development coaching roles.

=== Trades and draft selections ===
Trades:

- Picks 6 and 44 to Collingwood, in return for picks 11, 31, and 49.
- Pick 28 to the Brisbane Lions, in return for Elliot Yeo
- A round-three compensation pick in the 2014 AFL draft to Gold Coast, in return for pick 43 in the 2013 draft.

National Draft selections:

- 11 – Dom Sheed (Subiaco)
- 31 – Malcolm Karpany (Woodville-West Torrens)
- 43 – Tom Barrass (Claremont)
- 49 – Dylan Main (South Fremantle)
- 61 – Jamie Bennell (Melbourne, via West Coast) (rookie upgrade)
- 74 – Jeremy McGovern (East Fremantle, via West Coast) (rookie upgrade)
- 85 – Simon Tunbridge (Perth, via West Coast) (rookie upgrade)

Rookie Draft selections:

- 10 – Will Maginness (Oakleigh Chargers)
- 27 – Rowen Powell (Claremont)
- 38 – Murray Newman (Swan Districts, via West Coast) (re-drafted)

=== NAB Challenge and practice matches ===
Unlike previous pre-season tournaments, the 2014 NAB Challenge did not have a grand final or overall winner, instead consisting of "18 games in 18 days", with each team playing twice. West Coast began by defeating Fremantle by 84 points at Arena Joondalup, and also won their second game, against Sydney at Blacktown International Sportspark.

Date	Score	Opponent	Opponent's score	Result	Venue	Attendance
Tuesday, 18 February 4:10pm	2.20.10 (148)	Fremantle	0.10.4 (64)	Won by 84 points	Arena Joondalup	10,737
Thursday, 27 February 7:10pm	0.10.12 (72)	Sydney	0.5.7 (37)	Won by 35 points	Blacktown ISP	3,045
Thursday, 6 March 4:40pm	13.8 (86)	Fremantle	9.13 (67)	Won by 19 points	Patersons Stadium	12,000

== Home-and-away season ==
=== Results ===
Home team's score listed in bold:

Round	Date	Score	Opponent	Opponent's score	Result	Venue	Attendance
1	Sunday, 23 March 4:40pm	**21.8 (134)**	Western Bulldogs	11.3 (69)	Won by 65 points	Patersons Stadium	36,752
2	Sunday, 30 March 3:20pm	18.15 (123)	Melbourne	**4.6 (30)**	Won by 93 points	MCG	22,229
3	Saturday, 5 April 4:40pm	**12.11 (83)**	St Kilda	8.10 (58)	Won by 25 points	Patersons Stadium	36,448
4	Saturday, 12 April 7:40pm	4.8 (32)	Geelong	**16.11 (107)**	Lost by 75 points	Skilled Stadium	25,271
5	Saturday, 19 April 5:40pm	**7.14 (56)**	Port Adelaide	10.10 (70)	Lost by 14 points	Patersons Stadium	35,366
6	Saturday, 26 April 4:40pm	12.17 (89)	Carlton	**14.8 (92)**	Lost by 3 points	Etihad Stadium	31,005
7	Sunday, 4 May 2:40pm	**7.12 (54)**	Fremantle	11.7 (73)	Lost by 19 points	Patersons Stadium	40,476
8	Sunday, 11 May 2:40pm	**30.8 (188)**	GWS	12.5 (77)	Won by 111 points	Patersons Stadium	29,391
9	bye						
10	Saturday, 24 May 4:40pm	15.11 (101)	Collingwood	**17.7 (109)**	Lost by 8 points	MCG	53,049
11	Sunday, 1 June 5:40pm	**6.8 (44)**	North Melbourne	12.10 (82)	Lost by 38 points	Patersons Stadium	35,914
12	Saturday, 7 June 1:40pm	12.7 (79)	Hawthorn	**19.9 (123)**	Lost by 44 points	Aurora Stadium	15,504
13	Saturday, 14 June 2:40pm	**15.13 (103)**	Gold Coast	15.10 (100)	Won by 3 points	Patersons Stadium	32,942
14	Sunday, 22 June 3:20pm	10.10 (70)	St Kilda	**15.13 (103)**	Won by 33 points	Etihad Stadium	17,317
15	Saturday, 28 June 2:40pm	13.10 (88)	Fremantle	**11.15 (81)**	Lost by 7 points	Patersons Stadium	40,490
16	Sunday, 6 July 1:20pm	**7.9 (51)**	Sydney	10.19 (79)	Lost by 28 points	Patersons Stadium	25,076
17	Saturday, 12 July 7:40pm	9.10 (64)	Brisbane Lions	**11.10 (76)**	Won by 12 points	The Gabba	13,610
18	Friday, 25 July 6:40pm	**6.6 (42)**	Richmond	8.11 (59)	Lost by 17 points	Patersons Stadium	32,270
19	Saturday, 2 August 1:10pm	20.16 (136)	Adelaide	**16.9 (105)**	Won by 31 points	Adelaide Oval	49,470
20	Sunday, 10 August 2:40pm	**19.12 (126)**	Collingwood	10.6 (66)	Won by 60 points	Patersons Stadium	36,458
21	Saturday, 16 August 4:40pm	11.8 (74)	Essendon	**11.11 (77)**	Lost by 3 points	Etihad Stadium	35,905
22	Saturday, 23 August 5:40pm	**18.11 (119)**	Melbourne	8.5 (53)	Won by 66 points	Patersons Stadium	35,905
23	Sunday, 31 August 1:10pm	23.13 (151)	Gold Coast	**15.9 (99)**	Won by 52 points	Metricon Stadium	11,840

source: West Coast Eagles, 11 August 2014

== Tribunal cases ==
Seven West Coast Eagles players have so far been cited by the Match Review Panel during the 2014 season, with Patrick McGinnity, Luke Shuey, Darren Glass, Mark LeCras, and Josh Kennedy receiving suspensions:

Player	Round	Charge category	Subject of offence (club)	Result	Verdict	Carry-over^{[b]}
Patrick McGinnity	PS	Rough conduct	Danyle Pearce (Fremantle)	Guilty (early plea)	Suspension (one match)	96.17
Scott Selwood	PS	Misconduct	Craig Bird (Sydney)	Guilty (early plea)	Fine ($900)	0
Sharrod Wellingham	1	Tripping	Jason Johannisen (Western Bulldogs)	Guilty (early plea)	Reprimand	93.75
Luke Shuey	3	Striking	Tom Curren (St Kilda)	Guilty (early plea)	Suspension (one match)	85.63
Darren Glass	5	Rough conduct	Chad Wingard (Port Adelaide)	Guilty (early plea)	Suspension (one match)	64.06
Mark LeCras	8	Rough conduct	Will Hoskin-Elliott (GWS)	Guilty (early plea)	Suspension (one match)	26.56
Josh Kennedy	16	Rough conduct	Zak Jones (Sydney)	Guilty (early plea)	Suspension (one match)	82.81
Mark LeCras	18	Misconduct	Ty Vickery (Richmond)	Guilty (early plea)	Fine ($900)	0
Luke Shuey	18	Misconduct	Ty Vickery (Richmond)	Guilty (early plea)	Fine ($900)	0

== Season records and milestones ==
=== Team records ===
- Highest home attendance: 40,476 vs. Fremantle at Patersons Stadium, 4 May
- Highest away attendance: 53,049 vs. Collingwood at the MCG, 24 May
- Highest team score for: 30.8 (188) vs. GWS at Patersons Stadium, 11 May
- Highest team score against: 19.9 (123) by Collingwood at the MCG, 24 May
- Lowest team score for: 4.8 (32) vs. Geelong at Skilled Stadium, 12 April
- Lowest team score against: 4.6 (30) by Melbourne at the MCG, 30 March
- Great winning margin: 111 points vs. GWS at Patersons Stadium, 11 May
- Greatest losing margin: 75 points vs. Geelong at Skilled Stadium, 12 April
- Most consecutive wins: 3 (between rounds one and three)
- Most consecutive losses: 4 (between rounds four and seven)

Source: AFL Tables, 11 August 2014

=== Player records ===
Club records

- Most games: 19 – Jack Darling, Andrew Gaff, Eric Mackenzie, Matt Priddis
- Most goals: 61.33 – Josh Kennedy
- Most goals in a game: 11.0 – Josh Kennedy vs. GWS at Patersons Stadium, 11 May
- Most disposals: 627 – Matt Priddis
- Most kicks: 344 – Andrew Gaff
- Most handballs: 366 – Matt Priddis
- Most contested possessions: 330 - Matt Priddis
- Most clearances: 147 – Matt Priddis
- Most marks: 159 – Eric Mackenzie
- Most contested marks: 30 – Jeremy McGovern
- Most inside-50s: 88 – Luke Shuey
- Most rebound-50s: 74 – Eric Mackenzie
- Most tackles: 161 – Matt Priddis
- Most hit-outs: 438 – Nic Naitanui

Source: AFL Tables, 31 August 2014

AFL season records

- Matt Priddis led the AFL in disposals (627) and handballs (366). He was also ranked second for clearances (147) and contested possessions (330), and third for tackles (161). He recorded 18 tackles against Richmond in round 18, a season record.
- Adam Carter was ranked second in the AFL for disposal efficiency (95%).
- Eric Mackenzie was ranked equal third in the AFL for one-percenters (174), and fourth for marks (159).
- Andrew Gaff was ranked fifth in the AFL for uncontested possessions (382).
- Josh Kennedy was ranked fifth in the AFL for goals (61) and behinds (33). He kicked 11 goals against GWS in round 8, a season record.

Sources: AFL.com.au and AFL Tables, 31 August 2014

=== Milestones ===
- Eric Mackenzie played his 100th AFL game in round one, against the Western Bulldogs.
- Josh Kennedy played his 100th game for West Coast in round two, against Melbourne. (Coincidentally, Sydney's Josh P. Kennedy also played his 100th game for his club in the same round).
- Dean Cox played his 276th AFL game in round three, against St Kilda, equalling Glen Jakovich's club record, and surpassed the mark the following round. He played his 100th consecutive game in round seven, against Fremantle.
- Chris Masten played his 100th AFL game in round three.
- Brad Sheppard played his 50th AFL game in round six, against Carlton.
- Will Schofield played his 100th AFL game in round 12, against Hawthorn.
- Nic Naitanui played his 100th AFL game in round 14, against Gold Coast.
- Matt Rosa played his 150th AFL game in round 15, against Fremantle.
- Xavier Ellis played his 100th AFL game in round 17, against Brisbane.

=== Debuts ===
- Dom Sheed made his AFL debut in round one, against the Western Bulldogs, while Jamie Bennell, Xavier Ellis, and Elliot Yeo each made their club debuts for West Coast in the same match, having previously played for other clubs.
- Brant Colledge made his AFL debut in round three, against St Kilda.
- Jeremy McGovern made his AFL debut in round six, against Carlton.

== Ladder ==
2014 AFL ladder
Pos	Team	Pld	W	L	D	PF	PA	PP	Pts	
1	Sydney	22	17	5	0	2126	1488	142.9	68	Finals series
2	Hawthorn (P)	22	17	5	0	2458	1746	140.8	68	Finals series
3	Geelong	22	17	5	0	2033	1787	113.8	68	Finals series
4	Fremantle	22	16	6	0	2029	1556	130.4	64	Finals series
5	Port Adelaide	22	14	8	0	2180	1678	129.9	56	Finals series
6	North Melbourne	22	14	8	0	2026	1731	117.0	56	Finals series
7	Essendon	22	12	9	1	1828	1719	106.3	50	Finals series
8	Richmond	22	12	10	0	1887	1784	105.8	48	Finals series
9	West Coast	22	11	11	0	2045	1750	116.9	44	
10	Adelaide	22	11	11	0	2175	1907	114.1	44	
11	Collingwood	22	11	11	0	1766	1876	94.1	44	
12	Gold Coast	22	10	12	0	1917	2045	93.7	40	
13	Carlton	22	7	14	1	1891	2107	89.7	30	
14	Western Bulldogs	22	7	15	0	1784	2177	81.9	28	
15	Brisbane Lions	22	7	15	0	1532	2212	69.3	28	
16	Greater Western Sydney	22	6	16	0	1780	2320	76.7	24	
17	Melbourne	22	4	18	0	1336	1954	68.4	16	
18	St Kilda	22	4	18	0	1480	2436	60.8	16	

Source: AFL Tables
Rules for classification: 1) points; 2) percentage; 3) number of points for.
(P) Premiers

== Notes ==
^{b} Carry-over points accrue following a sanction. For example, 123.45 points would draw a one-match suspension, with 23.45 carry-over points (for every 100 points, a one-match suspension is given).
