= Nic Reid =

Australian Football League player

Personal information
- Full name: Nicolas Reid
- Born: 4 September 1995 (age 31)
- Original team: West Coast (Western Australian Football League)
- Draft: 2020 Pre-season Supplemental Selection Period, West Coast
- Debut: 16 August 2020, West Coast vs. Hawthorn, at Perth Stadium
- Height: 188 cm (6 ft 2 in)
- Weight: 88 kg (194 lb)
- Position: Medium Forward

Club information
- Current club: West Coast
- Number: 46

Playing career^{1}
Years	Club	Games (Goals)
2020	West Coast	3 (1)
- ^{1} Playing statistics correct to the end of Round 18 2020.

Nicolas Reid (born 4 September 1995) is an Australian rules footballer who played for the West Coast Eagles in the Australian Football League (AFL). He was recruited by West Coast through the 2020 Pre-season supplemental selection period.

== Early football ==
Reid played junior football for Claremont. He then decided to not continue onto professional football and played amateur football for his local side, North Beach Football Club. After kicking 48 goals in the 2018 season, he was selected to play for the West Coast reserves team in the Western Australian Football League (WAFL). In the 2019 WAFL season, he kicked 23 goals over the 15 games he played.

== AFL career ==
Reid was recruited by West Coast with during the 2020 pre-season supplemental selection period. Reid debuted in West Coast's 32 point win over Hawthorn in the 12th round of the 2020 AFL season. On debut, Reid kicked 1 goal and 1 behind, and collected 9 disposals and 3 tackles. Reid was delisted at the conclusion of the season after spending only the 2020 season with the Eagles

== Statistics ==
Statistics are correct to the 2020 season

Legend
G	Goals	K	Kicks	D	Disposals	T	Tackles
B	Behinds	H	Handballs	M	Marks

Season	Team	No.	Games	Totals							Averages (per game)						
Season	Team	No.	Games	G	B	K	H	D	M	T	G	B	K	H	D	M	T
2020 (Note: The 2020 season was played with 17 home-and-away matches per team (down from 22) and 16-minute quarters with time on (down from 20-minute quarters with time on) due to the impact of the COVID-19 pandemic.)	West Coast	36	3	1	1	8	13	21	1	8	0.3	0.3	2.7	4.3	7.0	0.3	2.7
Career			3	1	1	8	13	21	1	8	0.3	0.3	2.7	4.3	7.0	0.3	2.7

== Personal life ==
Before Reid turned to professional football, he was a Health & Physical Education teacher at Carine Senior High School.
