= Murray Newman =

Australian rules footballer

Personal information
- Full name: Murray Edgar Newman
- Born: 18 November 1993 (age 32); Perth, Western Australia
- Original team: Upper Swan JFC
- Draft: 23rd pick, 2011 National Draft (West Coast)
- Height: 179 cm (5 ft 10 in)
- Weight: 70 kg (154 lb)
- Positions: Forward pocket, midfielder

Playing career^{1}
Years	Club	Games (Goals)
2012–2015	West Coast	6 (4)
- ^{1} Playing statistics correct to the end of 2015.

Career highlights
- Western Australia under 18 team 2011

Murray Edgar Newman (born 18 November 1993) is a former professional Australian rules footballer who played for the West Coast Eagles in the Australian Football League (AFL).

From Perth, Western Australia, he played with the Swan Districts Football Club in the West Australian Football League (WAFL) before being drafted in the 2011 AFL National Draft. Having also represented Western Australia at the 2011 AFL Under 18 Championships, Newman has played a total of 19 games for Swan Districts. He made his senior debut for West Coast in Round 14 of the 2012 AFL season, in a game against the Gold Coast Suns at Patersons Stadium (30 June). Newman entered the game midway through the third quarter, kicking two goals in his debut.

After the 2012 season, Newman was involved in a fight outside a nightclub and was charged with causing grievous bodily harm. A few days later in two 2 kilometre training runs, Newman recorded the slowest times, even being beaten by his 44-year-old coach, John Worsfold.

He was delisted in October 2015.

Newman is an Australian Aboriginal of Yamatji and Noongar descent.
