= Francis Watson (footballer) =

Australian rules footballer

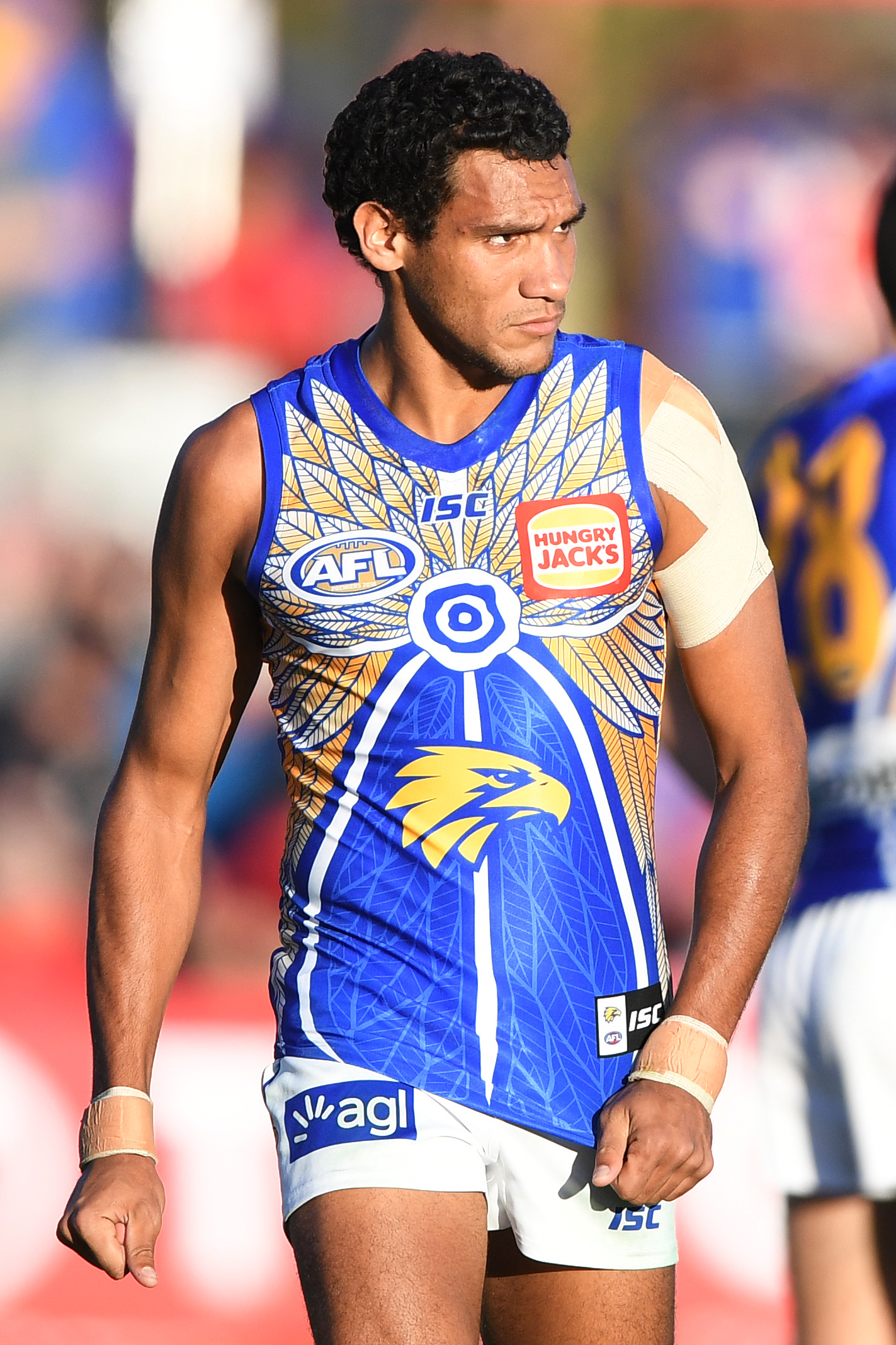
- Watson in July 2019

Personal information
- Full name: Francis Watson
- Nickname: Frankie
- Born: 29 September 1995 (age 31)
- Original team: Claremont (WAFL)
- Height: 187 cm (6 ft 2 in)
- Weight: 81 kg (179 lb)
- Position: Defender

Club information
- Current club: West Coast
- Number: 26

Playing career^{1}
Years	Club	Games (Goals)
2017-2020	West Coast	2 (0)
- ^{1} Playing statistics correct to the end of 2020.

Francis Watson (born 29 September 1995) is a professional Australian rules footballer who played for the West Coast Eagles in the Australian Football League (AFL).

== Early life ==
Watson grew up in the small East Kimberley community of Balgo, Western Australia. Watson started off at Claremont and played in the Colts WAFL premiership side in 2013. He made his West Australian Football League debut for Claremont in 2015, and played 19 senior games for Claremont over the 2015 and 2016 seasons. Due to his Indigenous background, the Fremantle Dockers sought permission to register him in the club's Next Generation Academy, but the application was rejected by the Australian Football League on the ground that he had not resided in the Kimberley during the relevant period. Watson was then eligible to sign with any club as a "Category B" rookie, and joined West Coast in November 2016.

== AFL career ==
Nearly three years after joining West Coast, Watson made his AFL debut as a late inclusion in their 13-point victory over Melbourne in round 18 of the 2019 AFL season. He came in at the expense of premiership captain Shannon Hurn with a calf injury moments before the game. Watson was delisted at the conclusion of the 2020 AFL season after just two games for the club.
