= Malcolm Karpany =

Australian rules footballer

Personal information
- Full name: Malcolm Karpany
- Born: 1 June 1995 (age 31)
- Original team: Woodville-West Torrens (SANFL)
- Draft: No. 31, 2013 national draft
- Debut: Round 19, 2016, West Coast vs. Collingwood, at MCG
- Height: 176 cm (5 ft 9 in)
- Weight: 73 kg (161 lb)
- Position: Midfielder

Playing career^{1}
Years	Club	Games (Goals)
2014–2018	West Coast	7 (6)
- ^{1} Playing statistics correct to the end of 2018.

Malcolm Karpany (born 1 June 1995) is a former professional Australian rules footballer who played for the West Coast Eagles in the Australian Football League (AFL).

He was raised in Adelaide and Moonta, South Australia. He is Indigenous Australian; his family are predominantly Narungga and he is related to Gavin Wanganeen and Michael O'Loughlin. During his high schooling, Malcolm moved to Adelaide and attended Rostrevor College. He was drafted by the West Coast Eagles with their second selection and thirty-first overall in the 2013 national draft. He made his debut in the nineteen point loss against Collingwood in round 19, 2016 at the Melbourne Cricket Ground. Karpany signed a one-year contract extension at the end of the 2017 season, but was delisted the following year.
