= Andrew Gaff =

Australian rules footballer

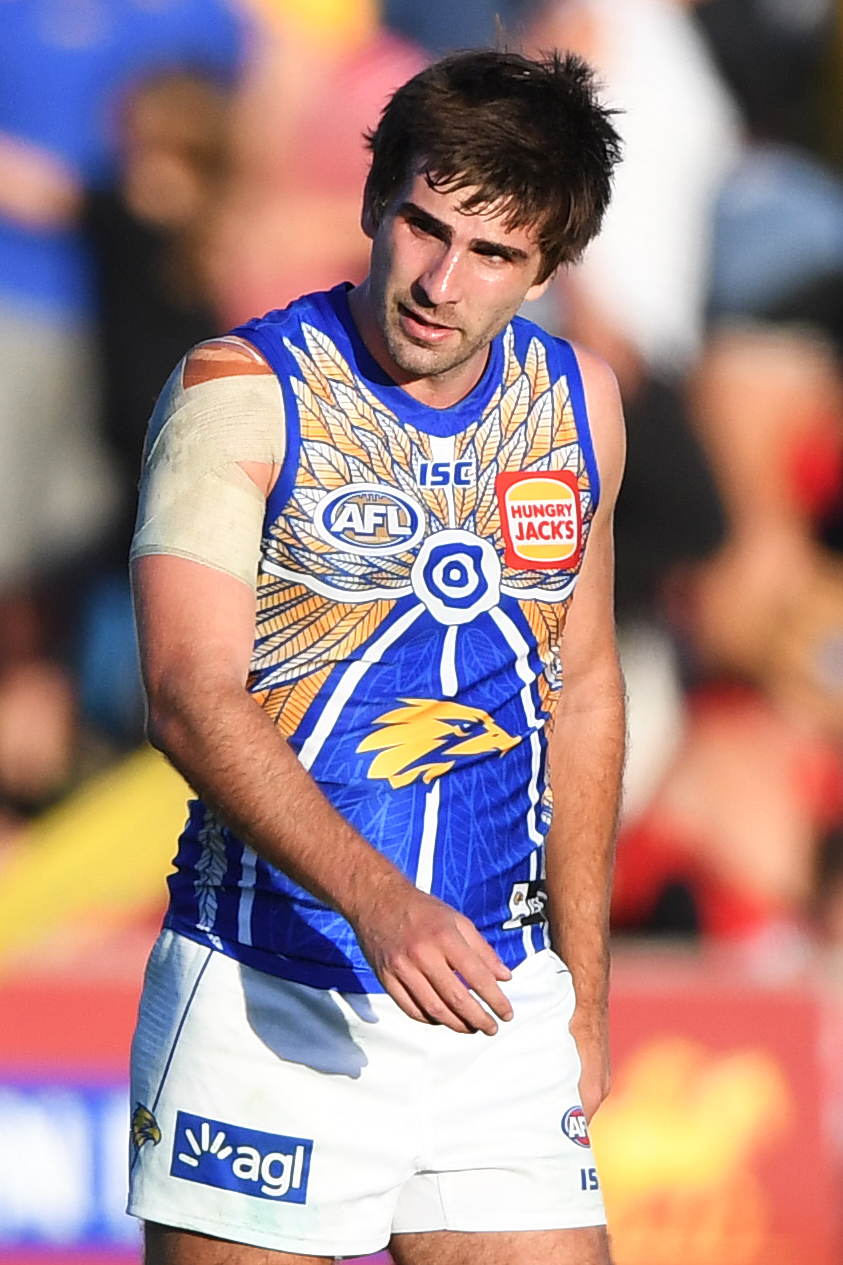
- Gaff playing for West Coast in July 2019

Personal information
- Full name: Andrew Gaff
- Nicknames: Gaffy, Gaffer tape
- Born: 16 June 1992 (age 34)
- Original team: Oakleigh Chargers (TAC Cup)
- Draft: No. 4, 2010 national draft
- Height: 183 cm (6 ft 0 in)
- Weight: 85 kg (187 lb)
- Position: Midfielder

Playing career
Years	Club	Games (Goals)
2011–2024	West Coast	280 (84)

Representative team honours
Years	Team	Games (Goals)
2020	Victoria	1 (2)

International team honours
2015	Australia	1 (0)

Career highlights
- 2× All-Australian team: 2015, 2018; John Worsfold Medal: 2015; West Coast Eagles Life Member: 2017; AFL Rising Star nominee: 2011

Andrew Gaff (born 16 June 1992) is a former professional Australian rules footballer who played for the West Coast Eagles in the Australian Football League (AFL). He played predominantly as a midfielder.

Gaff was recruited from the Oakleigh Chargers with the fourth pick in the 2010 National Draft. He made his debut in round one of the 2011 season, and later in the year was nominated for the AFL Rising Star Award. Gaff was a regular in the West Coast line-up since his debut, and in 2015 played in the club's grand final loss to Hawthorn. He won the John Worsfold Medal as West Coast's best and fairest player that year, and was also named in the 2015 All-Australian team. Gaff placed equal fourth in the 2016 Brownlow Medal. He was named in the 2018 All-Australian team.

== Early life ==
Gaff attended Kew East Primary School until 2004 and Carey Baptist Grammar School in his high school years. He starred in the Carey First XVIII football team as a hard-running midfielder who proved to be a prolific goalkicker.

Originally from the Kew Comets Junior Football Club in the Yarra Junior Football League, Gaff played in the TAC Cup with the Oakleigh Chargers. before being selected with the fourth pick overall in the 2010 National Draft by the West Coast Eagles. Recognised as one of the best prospects in his draft year, Gaff was renowned for his endurance, work ethic, kicking and ability to accumulate possessions.

Growing up, Gaff supported the Melbourne Football Club, and attended the 2000 AFL Grand Final as a spectator in which they lost to Essendon by 60 points.

== AFL career ==
Gaff played his first game for the Eagles in the pool round of the 2011 NAB Cup, playing against Hawthorn and gathering six possessions, before being rested in the second game against Fremantle.

He became the third player in the Eagles' history to wear the No. 3 jumper for the Eagles after Chris Mainwaring and Chris Judd. The jumper was retired for three years following Mainwaring's death in October 2007 and Judd's departure from the club prior to the 2008 season.

Gaff made his AFL debut in the opening round match against North Melbourne, replacing Chris Masten as the Eagles' first substitute player.

Gaff was rewarded for his form by being nominated for the 2011 AFL Rising Star award in round 19, 2011.

Gaff had an extremely consistent season in 2012, gathering a total of 591 disposals and booting 9 goals for the season.

His 2013 season wasn't as consistent as the season previous, but he still played 22 games and gathered 437 disposals.

In 2014, Gaff had further improved season, gathering 534 disposals and kicking 10 goals for the year, he also played 22 games.

2015 saw Andrew become a truly elite player in the competition, he amassed 738 disposals and kicked 11 goals for the season. Including a season highlight of 36 disposals and 3 goals against Adelaide in Round 15. As of the end of round 18, 2015, Gaff was having a career best year. He is ranked equal fifth in the AFL Coaches Association voting, and averages 29.9 touches a game, including a remarkable run of five straight games where he collected more than 30 disposals.

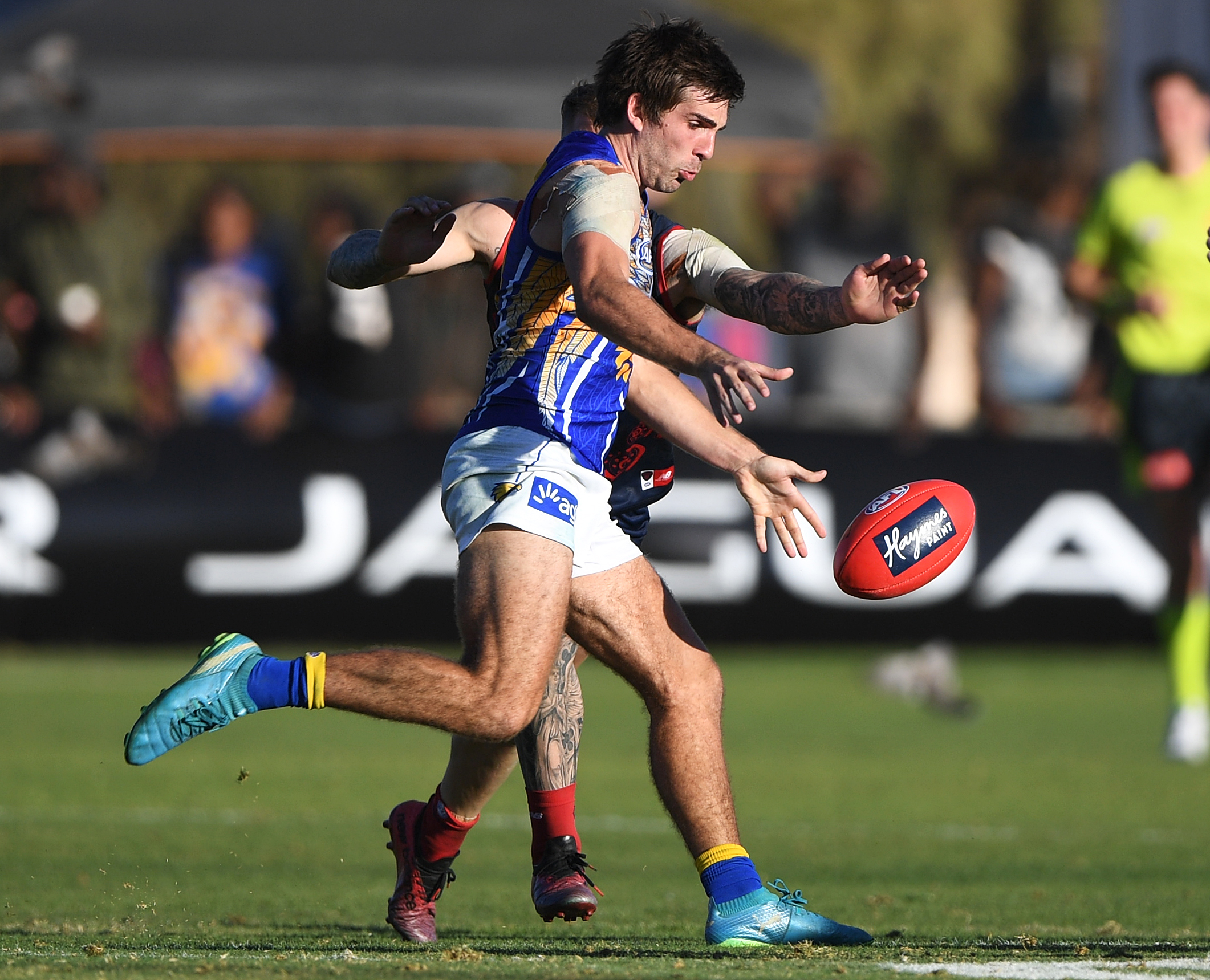
Andrew Gaff kicking during the 2019 AFL round 18

At the conclusion of the 2015 season, he was awarded the John Worsfold Medal as the club's best-and-fairest player. His outstanding form was recognised league-wide as he was named on the wing in the 2015 All-Australian team.

Gaff had another consistent year in 2016, despite being knocked unconscious in round 9 by Port Adelaide's Tom Jonas, causing him to miss a week and dip in form, albeit slightly. He rebounded strongly in the last month of the year as the Eagles found some stunning form. He had a career best 38 disposals in a clinical win over Hawthorn at Subiaco in round 22, and then set a new career-best tally with 41 disposals the next week against Adelaide at Adelaide Oval, as the Eagles entered the finals as the form team of the competition. He was rewarded with a place in the 40 person All-Australian squad, but was left out of the final 22-man team.

In 2018, Gaff was referred to the AFL Tribunal after an off-the-ball strike on Fremantle player Andrew Brayshaw which left Brayshaw with a broken jaw and three dislodged teeth. He was subsequently suspended for eight AFL matches leading to him missing out on playing in West Coast's premiership. In October, Gaff, a restricted free agent, announced he would turn down a contract with North Melbourne, reportedly for seven years and worth around $8 million, to stay at West Coast.

On August 7, 2024, Gaff announced that he will be playing his final two games before retiring at the conclusion of the 2024 AFL season.

== Statistics ==
Legend
G	Goals	K	Kicks	D	Disposals	T	Tackles
B	Behinds	H	Handballs	M	Marks

Season	Team	No.	Games	Totals							Averages (per game)							Votes
Season	Team	No.	Games	G	B	K	H	D	M	T	G	B	K	H	D	M	T	Votes
2011	West Coast	3	17	7	7	172	130	302	75	19	0.4	0.4	10.1	7.6	17.8	4.4	1.1	4
2012	West Coast	3	24	9	13	374	217	591	114	34	0.4	0.5	15.6	9.0	24.6	4.8	1.4	4
2013	West Coast	3	22	5	9	266	171	437	76	40	0.2	0.4	12.1	7.8	19.9	3.5	1.8	2
2014	West Coast	3	22	10	2	344	190	534	120	54	0.5	0.1	15.6	8.6	24.3	5.5	2.5	6
2015	West Coast	3	25	11	8	415	323	738	111	62	0.4	0.3	16.6	12.9	29.5	4.4	2.5	17
2016	West Coast	3	22	7	6	372	285	657	81	27	0.3	0.3	16.9	13.0	29.9	3.7	1.2	21
2017	West Coast	3	24	6	6	414	299	713	127	49	0.3	0.3	17.3	12.5	29.7	5.3	2.0	9
2018	West Coast	3	19	12	4	339	244	583	100	56	0.6	0.2	17.8	12.8	30.7	5.3	2.9	16
2019	West Coast	3	22	3	1	437	265	702	141	52	0.1	0.0	19.9	12.0	31.9	6.4	2.4	13
2020 (Note: The 2020 season was played with 17 home-and-away matches per team (down from 22) and 16-minute quarters with time on (down from 20-minute quarters with time on) due to the impact of the COVID-19 pandemic.)	West Coast	3	18	5	4	251	186	437	81	42	0.3	0.2	13.9	10.3	24.3	4.5	2.3	8
2021	West Coast	3	21	3	1	343	234	577	140	35	0.1	0.0	16.3	11.1	27.5	6.7	1.7	9
2022	West Coast	3	16	2	3	191	192	383	72	38	0.1	0.2	11.9	12.0	23.9	4.5	2.4	1
2023	West Coast	3	23	3	4	210	250	460	90	66	0.1	0.2	9.1	10.9	20.0	3.9	2.9	0
2024	West Coast	3	5	1	0	44	34	78	17	5	0.2	0.0	8.8	6.8	15.6	3.4	1.0	0
2025	West Coast	3	0	—	—	—	—	—	—	—	—	—	—	—	—	—	—	0
Career			280	84	68	4172	3020	7192	1345	579	0.3	0.2	14.9	10.8	25.7	4.8	2.1	110
