= Kurt Mutimer =

Australian rules footballer

Personal information
- Full name: Kurt Mutimer
- Born: 11 March 1997 (age 29)
- Original team: Dandenong Stingrays (TAC Cup)
- Draft: No. 57, 2015 national draft
- Debut: Round 6, 2017, West Coast vs. Fremantle, at Domain Stadium
- Height: 184 cm (6 ft 0 in)
- Weight: 81 kg (179 lb)
- Position: Midfielder

Club information
- Current club: West Coast
- Number: 38

Playing career^{1}
| Years | Club | Games (Goals) |
| 2016–2019 | West Coast | 4 (1) |
- ^{1} Playing statistics correct to the end of 2017.

Kurt Mutimer (born 11 March 1997) is a professional Australian rules footballer playing for the West Coast Eagles in the Australian Football League (AFL).

== Junior career ==
Mutimer grew up in Narre Warren North, Victoria, played for Narre North Foxes Football Club, and attended Hallam Secondary College. He later represented the Dandenong Stingrays in the TAC Cup. Mutimer averaged 15 possessions per match while playing in the AFL Under 18 Championships for Vic Country. He tested at the 2015 AFL Draft Combine, recording the equal-fastest 20 m (66 ft) sprint with a time of 2.88 seconds.

== AFL career ==
Mutimer was drafted by West Coast with their third selection and fifty-seventh overall in the 2015 national draft. West Coast's recruiting manager Rohan O'Brien commented on Mutimer's ability to play multiple midfield positions and his strong kicking skills and speed. During the 2016 pre-season, he aggravated a split left hamstring tendon suffered prior to the draft and underwent surgery. Mutimer was expected to be sidelined for ten weeks. In 2016, he played a total of 15 West Australian Football League (WAFL) games with West Coast's affiliate East Perth – seven in the reserves, eight in the league. Mutimer played four AFL games in 2017, making his debut in the forty-one point win against Fremantle at the Domain Stadium in round six.

In the WAFL, he played 15 games, including a 30-disposal, ten-tackle effort against the Perth Demons; a two-goal, 31-disposal match against East Fremantle; and a seven-tackle, 22-disposal game versus South Fremantle. Mutimer finished eighth in East Perth's best and fairest, polling 23 votes, the fourth-most of West Coast–listed players. In 2018, he played 17 WAFL matches, averaging 16.5 disposals.
