= Fraser McInnes =

Australian rules footballer (born 1993)

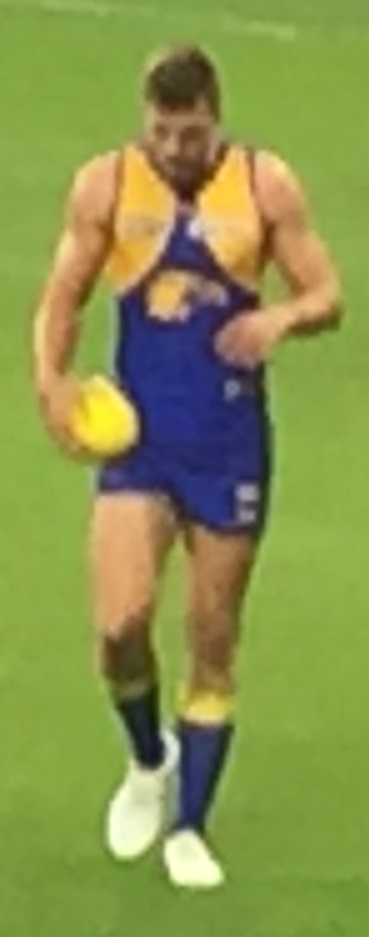

Personal information
- Full name: Fraser Campbell McInnes
- Born: 19 July 1993 (age 33)
- Original team: South Perth JFC
- Draft: No. 28, 2011 national draft No. 44, 2017 rookie draft
- Debut: Round 4, 2015, West Coast vs. Brisbane Lions, at The Gabba
- Height: 197 cm (6 ft 6 in)
- Weight: 97 kg (214 lb)
- Position: Utility

Club information
- Current club: West Coast
- Number: 36

Playing career^{1}
Years	Club	Games (Goals)
2012-2019	West Coast	14 (7)
- ^{1} Playing statistics correct to the end of round 15, 2018.

Fraser Campbell McInnes (born 19 July 1993) is a former professional Australian rules footballer who played for the West Coast Eagles in the Australian Football League (AFL).

From Perth, McInnes attended Trinity College before being drafted by West Coast with the twenty-eighth pick in the 2011 national draft. He did not make his senior debut for the club until much later, instead continuing to play in the West Australian Football League (WAFL), initially for the Perth Football Club and then with West Coast's new affiliate team, East Perth. In the WAFL, he played in a variety of positions, with stints as a key forward, key backman, and ruckman.

McInnes made his AFL debut for West Coast in round four of the 2015 season, where he recorded fifteen possessions, eight marks, and a goal against Brisbane. His most notable AFL game to date came against Gold Coast in round seven of the 2015 season, when he recorded twenty-two disposals, seven marks, and a single goal. He has kicked multiple goals in a game only once – two goals in a loss to North Melbourne, after which he was dropped to make way for Jack Darling's return from injury.

After playing only two matches during the 2016 season, McInnes was delisted in October, however, he was re-drafted by West Coast in the 2017 rookie draft. He was made captain of the inaugural West Coast Eagles' reserves team in the 2019 WAFL season.

McInnes was once again delisted by West Coast at the conclusion of the 2019 season.
