= Josh Rotham =

Australian rules footballer

Personal information
- Full name: Joshua Rotham
- Born: 25 February 1998 (age 28)
- Original teams: Whitford JFC; West Perth
- Draft: No. 37 in the 2016 national draft
- Debut: 6 April 2019, West Coast vs. Collingwood, at MCG
- Height: 193 cm (6 ft 4 in)
- Weight: 86 kg (190 lb)
- Position: Defender

Playing career
Years	Club	Games (Goals)
2017–2024	West Coast	72 (2)

Josh Rotham (born 25 February 1998) is an Australian rules footballer who last played for the West Coast Eagles in the Australian Football League (AFL). He was selected at pick #37 in the 2016 national draft. He made his senior debut against Collingwood in Round 3 of the 2019 season. Rotham won the Grand Final sprint for the 2021 AFL Grand Final, raising $5,000 for charity.

== Statistics ==
Legend
G	Goals	K	Kicks	D	Disposals	T	Tackles
B	Behinds	H	Handballs	M	Marks

Season	Team	No.	Games	Totals							Averages (per game)							Votes
Season	Team	No.	Games	G	B	K	H	D	M	T	G	B	K	H	D	M	T	Votes
2019	West Coast	35	4	0	0	34	15	49	24	6	0.0	0.0	8.5	3.8	12.3	6.0	1.5	0
2020 (Note: The 2020 season was played with 17 home-and-away matches per team (down from 22) and 16-minute quarters with time on (down from 20-minute quarters with time on) due to the impact of the COVID-19 pandemic.)	West Coast	35	10	0	0	90	17	107	52	12	0.0	0.0	9.0	1.7	10.7	5.2	1.2	0
2021	West Coast	35	19	0	1	232	73	305	161	18	0.0	0.1	12.2	3.8	16.1	8.5	0.9	0
2022	West Coast	35	13	2	0	103	38	141	71	21	0.2	0.0	7.9	2.9	10.8	5.5	1.6	0
2023	West Coast	35	13	0	0	102	28	130	68	18	0.0	0.0	7.8	2.2	10.0	5.2	1.4	0
2024	West Coast	35	13	0	0	88	19	107	60	11	0.0	0.0	6.8	1.5	8.2	4.6	0.8	0
2025	West Coast	35	0	—	—	—	—	—	—	—	—	—	—	—	—	—	—	0
Career			72	2	1	649	190	839	436	86	0.0	0.0	9.0	2.6	11.7	6.1	1.2	0
