= 2019 WAFL season =

West Australian Football League season

- Teams: 10
- Premiers: Subiaco; 15th premiership
- Minor premiers: Subiaco; 17th minor premiership
- Sandover Medallist: Lachlan Delahunty; Subiaco (28 votes)
- Bernie Naylor Medallist: Ben Sokol; Subiaco (51 goals)

The 2019 WAFL season (officially the 2019 Optus WAFL Premiership Season) was the 135th season of the various incarnations of the West Australian Football League (WAFL). The season commenced on 6 April and concluded on 22 September 2019. Subiaco defeated South Fremantle in the Grand Final by 96 points, the club's fourth premiership in six years and fifteenth overall. The 2019 season saw the introduction of a 10th team into the league, the West Coast Eagles reserves, after their alignment with East Perth was terminated in July 2018.

== Ladder ==
2019 WAFL ladder
Pos	Team	Pld	W	L	D	PF	PA	PP	Pts	
1	Subiaco (P)	18	17	1	0	1700	911	186.6	68	Finals series
2	South Fremantle	18	13	5	0	1556	1212	128.4	52	Finals series
3	Claremont	18	12	6	0	1368	1042	131.3	48	Finals series
4	West Coast	18	9	9	0	1214	1216	99.8	36	Finals series
5	West Perth	18	9	9	0	1389	1425	97.5	36	Finals series
6	Perth	18	9	9	0	1226	1335	91.8	36	
7	Peel Thunder	18	7	11	0	1285	1318	97.5	28	
8	East Fremantle	18	5	13	0	1109	1493	74.3	20	
9	East Perth	18	5	13	0	1004	1446	69.4	20	
10	Swan Districts	18	4	14	0	1005	1458	68.9	16	

Source: Australian Football
Rules for classification: 1) points; 2) percentage; 3) number of points for.
(P) Premiers

== Finals ==
=== Qualifying and Elimination Finals ===
	Qualifying Final
Saturday 31 August (2:40 pm)	South Fremantle 11.5 (71)	def.	Claremont 9.10 (64)	Fremantle Oval (crowd: 2,226)	Report

	Elimination Final
Sunday 1 September (2:40 pm)	West Coast 5.15 (45)	def.	West Perth 6.6 (42)	Arena Joondalup (crowd: 1,794)	Report

=== Semi-finals ===
	Semi-finals
Sunday 9 September (2:10 pm)	Claremont 10.6 (66)	def.	West Coast 8.12 (60)	Claremont Oval (crowd: 3,349)	Report
Sunday 9 September (2:10 pm)	Subiaco 14.13 (97)	def.	South Fremantle 10.3 (63)	Leederville Oval (crowd: 2,873)	Report

=== Preliminary final ===
	Preliminary final
Sunday 15 September (3:10 pm)	South Fremantle 9.9 (63)	def.	Claremont 4.9 (33)	Fremantle Oval (crowd: 3,494)	Report

=== Grand Final ===
2019 WAFL Grand Final
Sunday 22 September (2:40 pm)	Subiaco	v	South Fremantle	Optus Stadium (crowd: 18,491)	Report; Scorecard
4.3 (27); 9.7 (61); 13.7 (85); 18.12 (120)	Q1; Q2; Q3; Final	1.1 (7); 1.2 (8); 2.5 (17); 3.6 (24)	Umpires: Matt Adams (6), Dan Johanson (9), Jordan Wright (25); Simpson Medal: Ben Sokol (Subiaco); Television broadcast: Seven Network
Sokol 6, Marsh 3, Delahunty 2, Kitchin, Joyce, Moore, Newton, Wheeler, Horsley, Edwards-Baldwin	Goals	Bewick, Schloithe, Stewart
Sokol, Delahunty, Horsley, Marsh, Newton	Best	Main, Suban, Higgins

=== Bracket ===
Qualifying / Elimination Final
2	South Fremantle	11.5 (71)
3	Claremont	9.10 (64)
4	West Coast	5.15 (45)
5	West Perth	6.6 (42)

Semi-finals
1	Subiaco	14.13 (97)
2	South Fremantle	10.3 (63)
3	Claremont	10.6 (66)
4	West Coast	8.12 (60)

Preliminary final
2	South Fremantle	9.9 (63)
3	Claremont	4.9 (33)

Grand Final
1	Subiaco	18.12 (120)
2	South Fremantle	3.6 (24)

== See also ==
- List of WAFL premiers
- Australian rules football
- West Australian Football League
- Australian Football League
- 2019 AFL season
