= Brendon Ah Chee =

Australian rules footballer

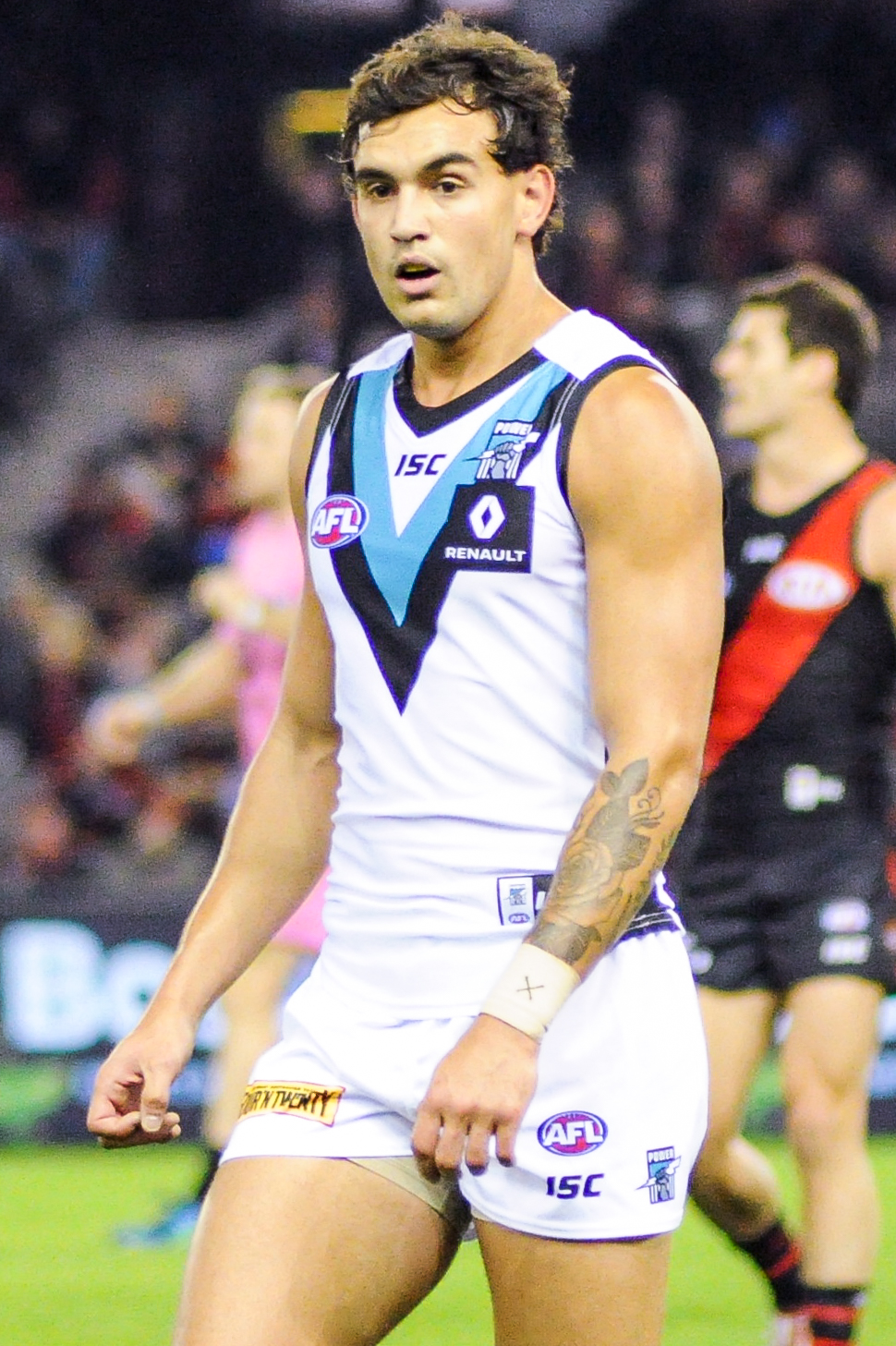
- Ah Chee playing for Port Adelaide in June 2017

Personal information
- Full name: Brendon Ah Chee
- Nickname: "Polly"
- Born: 21 December 1993 (age 32); Western Australia
- Original team: South Fremantle Football Club
- Draft: No. 45, 2011 national draft
- Height: 189 cm (6 ft 2 in)
- Weight: 88 kg (194 lb)
- Position: Midfielder/forward

Playing career^{1}
Years	Club	Games (Goals)
2012–2017	Port Adelaide	27 (17)
2018–2021	West Coast	31 (14)
Total		58 (31)
- ^{1} Playing statistics correct to the end of 2021.

Career highlights
- Port Adelaide SANFL best and fairest 2017

Brendon Ah Chee (born 21 December 1993) is a former Australian rules footballer who played for the West Coast Eagles and Port Adelaide in the Australian Football League (AFL). He now plays for South Fremantle in the WAFL.

An agile midfielder or forward, Ah Chee was recruited from South Fremantle Football Club in the 2011 AFL draft. His ancestors were Australian Aboriginal, Chinese, Dutch, and Scottish. His great-grandfather was Chinese. He is the older brother of Brisbane Lions player Callum Ah Chee. Ah Chee has the nickname Polly, because of his ability to handball unusually long distances like Graham "Polly" Farmer.

In season 2015, Ah Chee began his fourth season at Port Adelaide without a senior game to his name and needing to make an impression just to retain his spot on the list at season's end. Following some strong SANFL form, he was selected to make his AFL debut against North Melbourne in round 3. He started as substitute but had a late impact, setting up the winning goal with what eventually became his trademark long range handball. Ah Chee played a further 10 games and began to establish himself as an AFL player late in the season, collecting 24 disposals, 3 goals and 3 Brownlow Medal votes against Greater Western Sydney and then 25 disposals and a goal against Hawthorn. His combination of a strong body, athletic prowess, and a lightning handball made Ah Chee a valuable contributor to the Power.

In 2017, Ah Chee requested a trade from Port Adelaide, citing a lack of opportunity as the primary reason. At the start of the trade period, he then nominated the West Coast Eagles as his preferred club. Ah Chee was traded to West Coast in October.
