= Tom Cole (footballer) =

Australian rules footballer

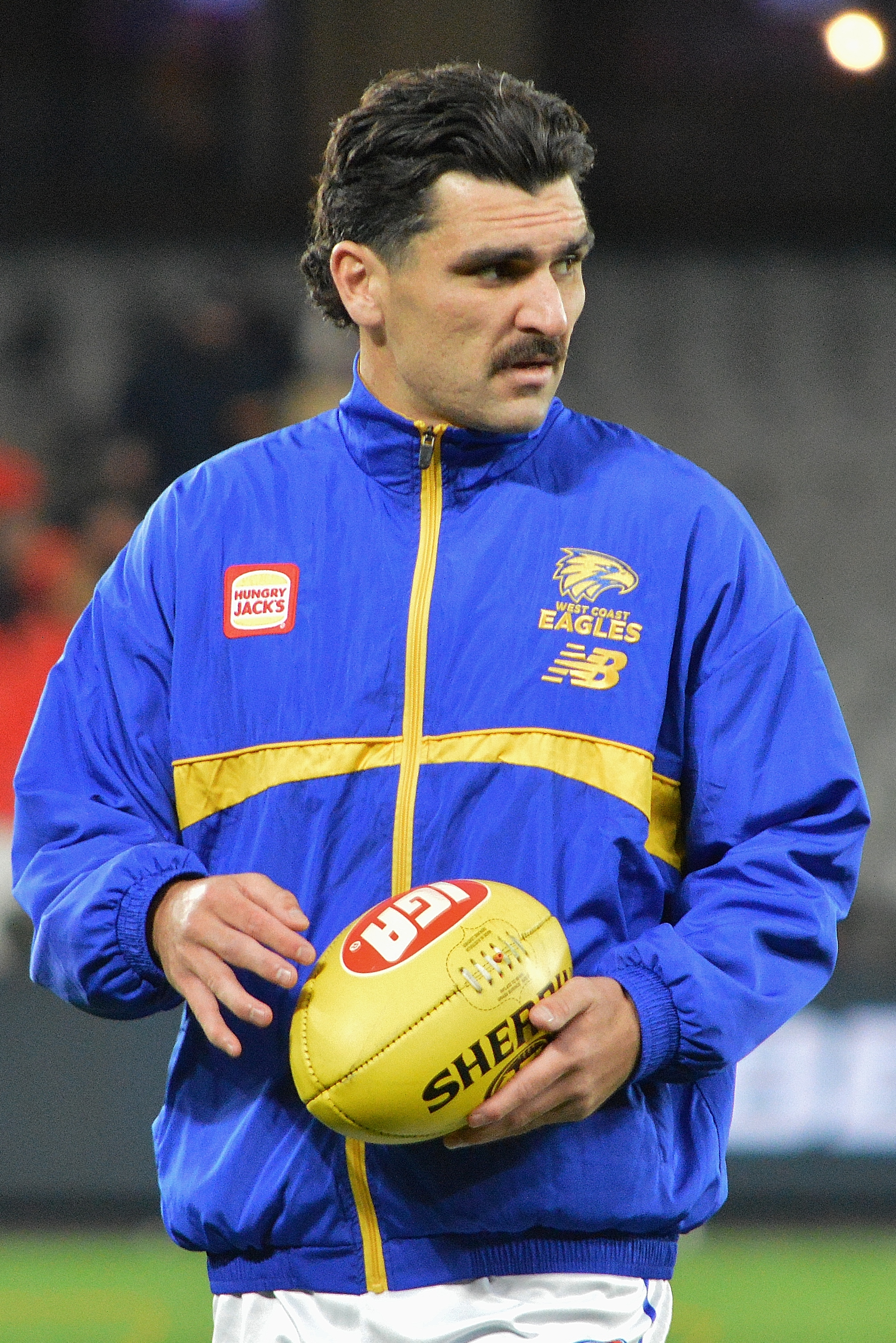
- Cole in May 2026

Personal information
- Full name: Thomas Cole
- Born: 28 May 1997 (age 29)
- Original team: Bendigo Pioneers (TAC Cup)
- Draft: No. 36, 2015 national draft
- Debut: Round 10, 2016, West Coast vs. Gold Coast, at Domain Stadium
- Height: 186 cm (6 ft 1 in)
- Weight: 81 kg (179 lb)
- Position: Defender / midfielder

Club information
- Current club: West Coast
- Number: 28

Playing career^{1}
Years	Club	Games (Goals)
2016–	West Coast	146 (13)
- ^{1} Playing statistics correct to the end of round 22, 2026.

Career highlights
- AFL premiership player: 2018; AFL Rising Star nominee: 2018

Thomas Cole (born 28 May 1997) is an Australian rules footballer playing for the West Coast Eagles in the Australian Football League (AFL). He was drafted by the West Coast Eagles with their second selection and thirty-sixth overall in the 2015 national draft. He made his debut in the seventy-seven point win against Gold Coast in round 10, 2016 at Domain Stadium. In round 19, 2018, Cole was nominated for the AFL Rising Star after recording 18 disposals, 11 intercept possessions and 5 rebound 50s in a 40 point loss to North Melbourne. He married Lily Burke in December 2022. His child Teddy Grace Cole was born in October 2023.

== Statistics ==
Updated to the end of round 22, 2026.

Legend
G	Goals	K	Kicks	D	Disposals	T	Tackles
B	Behinds	H	Handballs	M	Marks
#	Played in that season's premiership team

Season	Team	No.	Games	Totals							Averages (per game)							Votes
Season	Team	No.	Games	G	B	K	H	D	M	T	G	B	K	H	D	M	T	Votes
2016	West Coast	28	2	0	0	13	13	26	8	2	0.0	0.0	6.5	6.5	13.0	4.0	1.0	0
2017	West Coast	28	4	0	0	17	16	33	7	10	0.0	0.0	4.3	4.0	8.3	1.8	2.5	0
2018^{#}	West Coast	28	21	0	1	151	124	275	73	51	0.0	0.0	7.2	5.9	13.1	3.5	2.4	0
2019	West Coast	28	14	0	0	107	53	160	67	47	0.0	0.0	7.6	3.8	11.4	4.8	3.4	0
2020 (Note: The 2020 season was played with 17 home-and-away matches per team (down from 22) and 16-minute quarters with time on (down from 20-minute quarters with time on) due to the impact of the COVID-19 pandemic.)	West Coast	28	15	3	0	95	62	157	49	30	0.2	0.0	6.3	4.1	10.5	3.3	2.0	0
2021	West Coast	28	22	0	0	203	98	301	105	44	0.0	0.0	9.2	4.5	13.7	4.8	2.0	0
2022	West Coast	28	0	—	—	—	—	—	—	—	—	—	—	—	—	—	—	0
2023	West Coast	28	12	1	0	108	86	194	67	29	0.1	0.0	9.0	7.2	16.2	5.6	2.4	0
2024	West Coast	28	23	0	2	222	137	359	98	71	0.0	0.1	9.7	6.0	15.6	4.3	3.1	0
2025	West Coast	28	18	1	2	156	139	295	90	53	0.1	0.1	8.7	7.7	16.4	5.0	2.9	0
2026	West Coast	28	15	8	5	106	76	182	60	38	0.5	0.3	7.1	5.1	12.1	4.0	2.5	0
Career			146	13	10	1178	804	1982	624	375	0.1	0.1	8.1	5.5	13.6	4.3	2.6	0
