= Eric Mackenzie (footballer) =

Australian rules footballer (born 1988)

Personal information
- Full name: Eric William Ross Mackenzie
- Nickname: Eazy
- Born: 19 May 1988 (age 38); Perth
- Original team: Christ Church Grammar School
- Draft: No. 29, 2006 national draft
- Height: 196 cm (6 ft 5 in)
- Weight: 100 kg (220 lb)
- Position: Defender

Playing career^{1}
Years	Club	Games (Goals)
2007–2018	West Coast	147 (7)
- ^{1} Playing statistics correct to the end of 2018.

Career highlights
- West Coast captain: 2014; John Worsfold Medallist 2014

Eric William Ross Mackenzie (born 19 May 1988) is a former Australian rules footballer who played for the West Coast Eagles in the Australian Football League (AFL). Originally from Claremont in the West Australian Football League (WAFL), Mackenzie was drafted by West Coast at the 2006 National Draft, and made his debut during the 2007 season.

== Career ==
=== West Coast Eagles ===
Mackenzie was drafted in the 2nd round of the 2006 AFL Draft.

A key position defender, he had his best season to date in 2014. He replaced the retiring Darren Glass as the club's leading backman and was named acting co-captain of the club for the remainder of the season, along with four other players. He ended the year by winning the Eagles' best and fairest award, the John Worsfold Medal, beating Brownlow Medallist Matt Priddis by 11 votes.

He missed the entire 2015 AFL season after tearing his anterior cruciate ligament in West Coast's first pre-season game of the year against Carlton.

In the final minutes of the 2017 Elimination Final played against Port Adelaide Power, with scores level, Mackenzie kept Port Adelaide from scoring a behind, throwing the full force of his body into the point post in the process. This helped force the Elimination Final into extra time, where the Eagles emerged victorious.

Mackenzie retired at the end of the 2018 season, after consistent troubles with injury.
