= Brad Sheppard =

Australian rules footballer (born 1991)

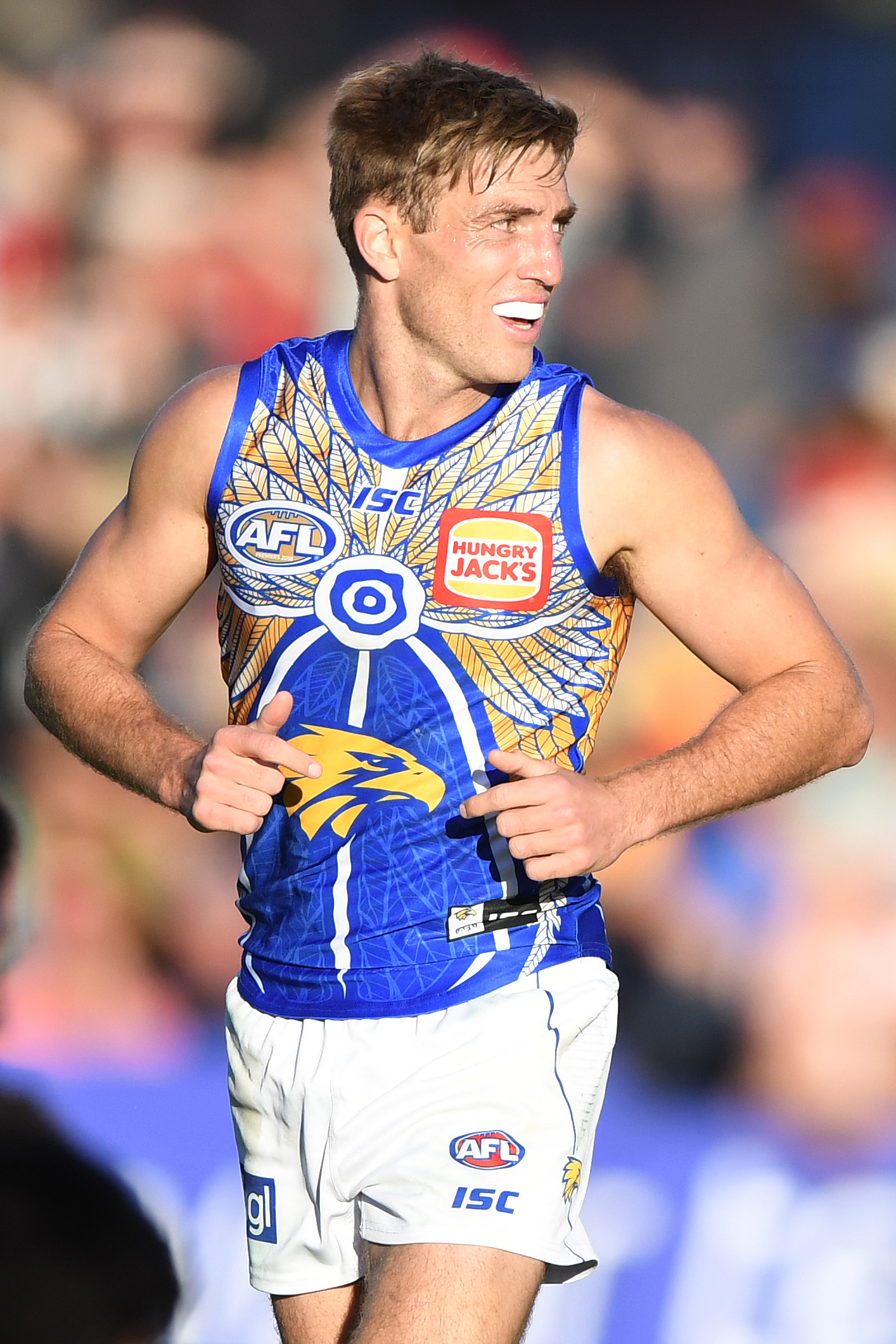
- Sheppard playing for West Coast in July 2019

Personal information
- Full name: Bradley Ross Sheppard
- Born: 23 May 1991 (age 35); Perth, Western Australia
- Original teams: East Fremantle, WAFL
- Draft: 7th overall pick, 2009; West Coast
- Height: 189 cm (6 ft 2 in)
- Weight: 73 kg (161 lb)
- Position: Defender

Playing career^{1}
Years	Club	Games (Goals)
2010–2021	West Coast	216 (19)

Representative team honours
Years	Team	Games (Goals)
2020	All Stars	1 (0)
- ^{1} Playing statistics correct to the end of 2021.

Career highlights
- All-Australian team: 2020; Glendinning–Allan Medal: 2019 (round 16); West Coast Eagles life member: 2018; Chris Mainwaring Medal (West Coast best clubman) 2020

Bradley Ross Sheppard (born 23 May 1991) is a former Australian rules footballer who played for the West Coast Eagles in the Australian Football League (AFL). He was selected seventh overall in the 2009 National Draft.

== Early career ==
Sheppard was born Perth, Western Australia and attended Wesley College. He represented Western Australia at the National AFL U18 Championships in both 2008, when he was ineligible to be drafted, and again in 2009, his draft year. In 2009, he played 15 games at WAFL League level with the East Fremantle Football Club and was also awarded a position in the Under 18 All-Australian as a back pocket for his performance at the 2009 AFL U18 Championships. Sheppard was invited to and attended the annual AFL Draft Camp at the Australian Institute of Sport in Canberra in October 2009 and tested in the top 10 in the 20 m sprint (=10th, 2.96s) and 6x30m repeat sprints (24.69s) out of those that attended.

He has represented Western Australia in cricket at under-17 level and is related to the Australian cricketing Marsh family, with Geoff Marsh as an uncle and cousins Shaun and Mitchell Marsh.

== AFL career ==
Sheppard made his debut for the West Coast Eagles against Hawthorn in round 7, 2010. He was on the end of a dangerous tackle from Hawthorn's Chance Bateman which saw him suspended for two weeks.

In 2015, he was named the club's player of the finals after an impressive campaign which saw the Eagles make the Grand Final, ultimately losing to a rampant Hawthorn. Sheppard was one of the best in the deciding match.

In Round 17 of the 2018 Season, Sheppard played his 150th match against the Fremantle Dockers.

In the first week of the 2018 Finals series, Sheppard suffered a season-ending hamstring injury and subsequently missed playing in the 2018 AFL Grand Final which was won by West Coast. Sheppard bounced back the next two seasons, making the All Australian squad in 2019, Sheppard made the final cut in 2020 being selected as a defender in the All-Australian team.

Sheppard suffered two major concussions in 2021, the first a serious head collision with Carlton’s Adam Saad in Round 12, the other in Round 22 against Fremantle suffering delayed concussion after landing head first on concrete after falling over a fence at Optus Stadium, Sheppard was force to miss games the following week from both incidents. In December of that year, Sheppard, still suffering ongoing symptoms from the two head knocks, was forced into retirement after receiving medical advice that if he would continued to play he would risk more damage to himself.

== Playing style ==
As a young player, Sheppard was considered well-rounded with good ball carrying ability, neat and reliable foot skills, fine decision making ability, strong work-ethic and athleticism (speed and endurance) as strengths.

== Statistics ==
Statistics are correct to the end of the 2021 season

Legend
G	Goals	K	Kicks	D	Disposals	T	Tackles
B	Behinds	H	Handballs	M	Marks
†	Led the league for the season

Season	Team	No.	Games	Totals							Averages (per game)						
Season	Team	No.	Games	G	B	K	H	D	M	T	G	B	K	H	D	M	T
2010	West Coast	12	14	2	6	118	90	208	42	31	0.1	0.4	8.4	6.4	14.9	3.0	2.2
2011	West Coast	12	6	1	0	48	26	74	17	22	0.2	0.0	8.0	4.3	12.3	2.8	3.7
2012	West Coast	5	12	6	3	98	58	156	47	24	0.5	0.3	8.2	4.8	13.0	3.9	2.0
2013	West Coast	5	13	3	4	97	57	154	37	31	0.2	0.3	7.5	4.4	11.9	2.6	2.4
2014	West Coast	5	14	0	1	162	72	234	57	34	0.0	0.1	11.6	5.1	16.7	4.1	2.4
2015	West Coast	5	25	3	4	264	163	427	141	39	0.1	0.2	10.6	6.5	17.1	5.6	1.6
2016	West Coast	5	23	1	2	207	167	374	110	48	0.0	0.1	9.0	7.3	16.3	4.8	2.1
2017	West Coast	5	24	1	0	188	169	357	99	71	0.0	0.0	7.8	7.0	14.9	4.1	3.0
2018	West Coast	5	23	0	1	253	120	373	148	53	0.0	0.0	11.0	5.2	16.2	6.4	2.3
2019	West Coast	5	24	0	2	324	139	463	188^{†}	37	0.0	0.1	13.5	5.8	19.3	7.8	1.5
2020 (Note: The 2020 season was played with 17 home-and-away matches per team (down from 22) and 16-minute quarters with time on (down from 20-minute quarters with time on) due to the impact of the COVID-19 pandemic.)	West Coast	5	18	2	0	194	92	286	112	34	0.1	0.0	10.8	5.1	15.9	6.2	1.9
2021	West Coast	5	20	0	0	220	127	347	129	32	0.0	0.0	11.0	6.4	17.4	6.5	1.6
Career			216	19	23	2173	2544	3453	1127	456	0.1	0.1	10.1	5.9	16.0	5.2	2.1
