= Chris Masten =

Australian rules footballer

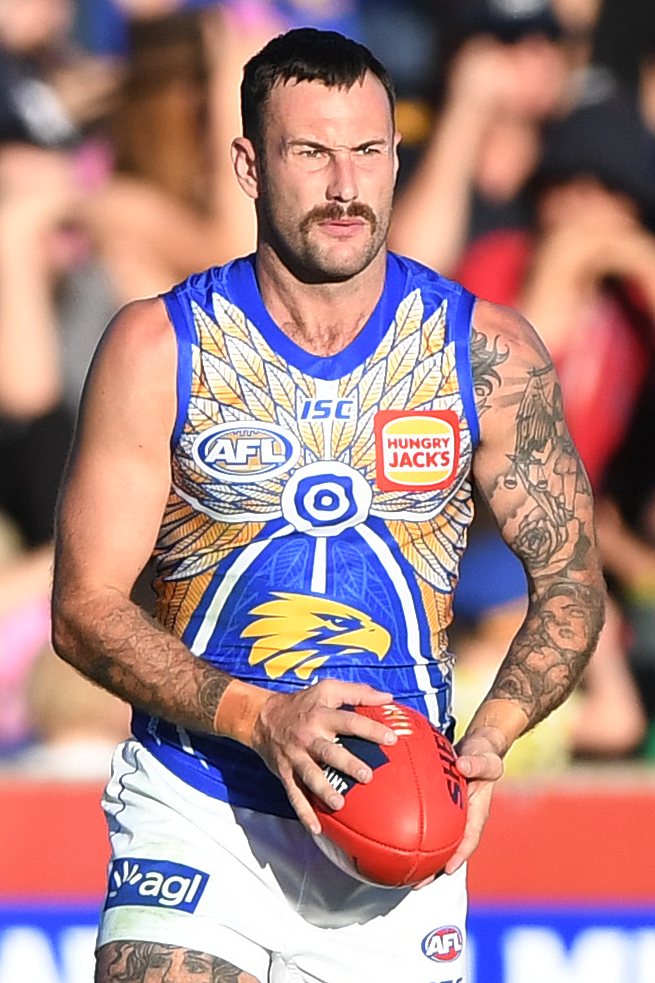
- Masten playing for West Coast in July 2019

Personal information
- Full name: Christopher Michael Masten
- Born: 2 May 1989 (age 37)
- Original team: East Fremantle (WAFL)West Coast Eagles(AFL)
- Draft: No. 3, 2007 national draft
- Height: 179 cm (5 ft 10 in)
- Weight: 77 kg (170 lb)
- Position: Midfielder

Playing career^{1}
Years	Club	Games (Goals)
2008–2019	West Coast	215 (70)
- ^{1} Playing statistics correct to the end of 2019.

Career highlights
- AFL premiership player: 2018; AFL Rising Star nominee 2009

Christopher Michael Masten (born 2 May 1989) is an Australian rules footballer and former player for the West Coast Eagles in the Australian Football League (AFL) and was delisted at the end of the 2019 season, after playing a pivotal role in the Eagles premiership in 2018. He was chosen as the first-round pick (number 3 overall) in the 2007 AFL draft by the Eagles, the team he had supported as a child.

== Career ==
Masten showed strong leadership in the 2007 Under-18 championships, captaining Western Australia to win the tournament and on an individual level winning All-Australian honours averaging 25 disposals and five clearances across the 3 games. He was also a graduate of the AIS/AFL Academy in 2006.

He made his senior debut for West Australian Football League (WAFL) team East Fremantle in the round 1 win against South Fremantle, gathering 17 disposals and kicking 3 goals. Masten went on to play 15 games and average 14 disposals per game while also kicking 6 goals for the season.

Masten made his professional debut in round 2 of the 2008 season against Adelaide. While in his debut match he gathered 11 possessions, he was dropped for the next match against arch-rivals Fremantle. He returned for the next match against Sydney finishing with 16 possessions, the second highest possession getter for the team in that match, he went to play a further seven matches of the season including West Coast's win over Adelaide in round 9 of 2008, in that match he also scored his first goal in the AFL before being sent away mid-season to have groin surgery for osteitis pubis.

He returned in 2009 and was awarded an AFL rising star nomination in round 16 against Port Adelaide, with a career-high 38 possession game.

In 2012 Masten played in every game and finished seventh in the club's best and fairest award. He repeated the top 10 finishes for the next two years as he cemented his position in the Eagles midfield.

In August 2015, Masten was found guilty of biting Fremantle player Nick Suban by the AFL tribunal. He was suspended for two matches. It was the first biting case in the AFL since former Eagle Chris Lewis was banned for three matches in 1991.

After 215 games with West Coast, Masten and the club parted ways in September 2019.

== Statistics ==
Statistics are correct to the end of the 2022 season

Legend
G	Goals	K	Kicks	D	Disposals	T	Tackles
B	Behinds	H	Handballs	M	Marks
#	Played in that season's premiership team

Season	Team	No.	Games	Totals							Averages (per game)							Votes
Season	Team	No.	Games	G	B	K	H	D	M	T	G	B	K	H	D	M	T	Votes
2008	West Coast	13	9	1	4	79	57	136	39	41	0.1	0.4	8.8	6.3	15.1	4.3	4.6	2
2009	West Coast	13	19	5	11	175	211	386	39	53	0.3	0.6	9.2	11.1	20.3	2.1	2.8	0
2010	West Coast	7	13	4	3	87	119	206	35	31	0.3	0.2	6.7	9.2	15.8	2.7	2.4	0
2011	West Coast	7	13	7	4	91	99	190	32	42	0.5	0.3	7.0	7.6	14.6	2.5	3.2	3
2012	West Coast	7	24	20	9	298	223	521	104	78	0.8	0.4	12.4	9.3	21.7	4.3	3.3	3
2013	West Coast	7	19	9	3	282	218	500	84	74	0.5	0.2	14.8	11.5	26.3	4.4	3.9	8
2014	West Coast	7	21	5	2	272	207	479	101	76	0.2	0.1	13.0	9.9	22.8	4.8	3.6	3
2015	West Coast	7	22	2	11	252	296	548	86	48	0.1	0.5	11.5	13.5	24.9	3.9	2.2	5
2016	West Coast	7	21	4	4	231	237	468	83	38	0.2	0.2	11.0	11.3	22.3	4.0	1.8	0
2017	West Coast	7	13	3	2	126	167	293	55	35	0.2	0.2	9.7	12.8	22.5	4.2	2.7	0
2018^{#}	West Coast	7	24	7	5	274	190	464	140	42	0.3	0.2	11.4	7.9	19.3	5.8	1.8	1
2019	West Coast	7	17	3	1	168	114	282	93	30	0.2	0.1	9.9	6.7	16.6	5.5	1.8	0
Career			215	70	59	2335	2138	4473	891	588	0.3	0.3	9.9	10.1	20.8	4.1	2.7	25

== Off-field incident ==
On Australia Day in 2008, Masten was arrested for disorderly conduct after drunkenly punching a man to the ground. Masten pleaded guilty to the disorderly conduct charge and was fined $750 and ordered to pay costs of $110 and received a spent conviction. Masten was also fined $2000 and suspended by the West Coast Eagles from the pre-season NAB Cup.
