= List of AFL debuts in 2014 =

During the 2014 Australian Football League (AFL) season a total of 83 Australian rules footballers made their AFL debut with 50 more playing their first game for a new club.

== Summary ==
Summary of debuts in 2014
Club	AFL debuts	Change of club
Adelaide	3	2
Brisbane Lions	10	3
Carlton	4	4
Collingwood	4	3
Essendon	7	2
Fremantle	2	1
Geelong	4	1
Gold Coast	6	0
Greater Western Sydney	4	5
Hawthorn	7	2
Melbourne	4	5
North Melbourne	6	3
Port Adelaide	4	2
Richmond	2	4
St Kilda	5	5
Sydney	5	3
West Coast	3	3
Western Bulldogs	3	2
Total	83	50

== AFL debuts ==
Name	Club	Age at debut	Debut round	Games (in 2014)	Goals (in 2014)	Notes
Tom Langdon	Collingwood	19 years, 278 days	1	19	0	Pick 65 (2013 National Draft), round 7 nomination 2014 AFL Rising Star
Jack Martin	Gold Coast	19 years, 45 days	1	11	10	Pick 1 (2012 Mini Draft), round 23 nomination 2014 AFL Rising Star
Clay Cameron	Gold Coast	19 years, 292 days	1	9	1	Pick 58 (2012 National Draft)
Sean Lemmens	Gold Coast	19 years, 133 days	1	18	3	Pick 27 (2013 National Draft)
Tom Clurey	Port Adelaide	19 years, 358 days	1	1	0	Pick 29 (2012 National Draft)
Jarman Impey	Port Adelaide	18 years, 250 days	1	18	3	Pick 21 (2013 National Draft), round 8 nomination 2014 AFL Rising Star
Luke McDonald	North Melbourne	19 years, 39 days	1	23	0	Pick 8 (2013 National Draft), son of Donald McDonald, round 4 nomination 2014 AFL Rising Star
Patrick Ambrose	Essendon	22 years, 200 days	1	16	13	Pick 26 (2014 Rookie Draft)
Martin Gleeson	Essendon	19 years, 207 days	1	9	2	Pick 53 (2013 National Draft)
Zach Merrett	Essendon	18 years, 168 days	1	20	11	Pick 26 (2013 National Draft), brother of Jackson Merrett, round 11 nomination 2014 AFL Rising Star
Tim O'Brien	Hawthorn	19 years, 359 days	1	4	2	Pick 28 (2012 National Draft)
Derick Wanganeen	Hawthorn	23 years, 45 days	1	1	0	Pick 33 (2014 Rookie Draft)
James Aish	Brisbane Lions	18 years, 134 days	1	21	6	Pick 7 (2013 National Draft), son of Andrew Aish, nephew of Michael Aish, round 6 nomination 2014 AFL Rising Star.
Lewis Taylor	Brisbane Lions	19 years, 33 days	1	22	12	Pick 28 (2013 National Draft), round 9 nomination 2014 AFL Rising Star, and winner of the Ron Evans Medal (Rising Star Award)
Michael Close	Brisbane Lions	19 years, 235 days	1	14	10	Pick 32 (2012 National Draft)
Jack Billings	St Kilda	18 years, 216 days	1	16	14	Pick 3 (2013 National Draft)
Luke Dunstan	St Kilda	19 years, 52 days	1	16	9	Pick 18 (2013 National Draft), round 1 nomination 2014 AFL Rising Star
Eli Templeton	St Kilda	18 years, 215 days	1	6	4	Pick 3 (2014 Rookie Draft)
Jay Kennedy Harris	Melbourne	19 years, 1 day	1	14	9	Pick 40 (2013 National Draft)
Alex Georgiou	Melbourne	24 years, 49 days	1	7	0	Pick 35 (2014 Rookie Draft)
Dom Sheed	West Coast	18 years, 347 days	1	10	1	Pick 11 (2013 National Draft), winner 2013 Larke Medal, round 15 nomination 2015 AFL Rising Star
Angus Litherland	Hawthorn	21 years, 167 days	2	13	0	Pick 55 (2010 National Draft)
Josh Kelly	Greater Western Sydney	19 years, 46 days	2	18	13	Pick 2 (2013 National Draft), son of Phil Kelly, round 3 nomination 2014 AFL Rising Star
Kade Kolodjashnij	Gold Coast	18 years, 232 days	2	18	5	Pick 5 (2013 National Draft), brother of Jake Kolodjashnij, round 10 nomination 2014 AFL Rising Star
Daniel Currie	North Melbourne	25 years, 44 days	2	4	3	Pick 56 (2012 National Draft), previously drafted by Sydney Swans
Matt Crouch	Adelaide	18 years, 349 days	3	8	3	Pick 23 (2013 National Draft), brother of Brad Crouch, round 5 nomination 2014 AFL Rising Star
Brant Colledge	West Coast	19 years, 162 days	3	2	0	Pick 45 (2012 National Draft)
Jason Ashby	Essendon	19 years, 325 days	3	5	0	Pick 34 (2012 National Draft)
Sam Lloyd	Richmond	24 years, 39 days	4	8	10	Pick 66 (2013 National Draft)
Patrick Cripps	Carlton	19 years, 22 days	4	3	0	Pick 13 (2013 National Draft), round 4 nomination 2015 AFL Rising Star
Sam Gray	Port Adelaide	22 years, 70 days	4	7	6	Pick 29 (2014 Rookie Draft)
Nick Robertson	Brisbane Lions	18 years, 313 days	4	8	0	Pick 34 (2013 National Draft)
Tom Cutler	Brisbane Lions	19 years, 51 days	4	7	2	Pick 33 (2013 National Draft)
Dylan van Unen	Essendon	23 years, 295 days	4	1	0	Pick 51 (2012 National Draft)
Darcy Gardiner	Brisbane Lions	18 years, 207 days	5	17	2	Pick 38 (2013 National Draft)
Jake Lloyd	Sydney	20 years, 211 days	5	20	8	Pick 16 (2013 Rookie Draft)
Tom Boyd	Greater Western Sydney	18 years, 241 days	5	9	8	Pick 1 (2013 National Draft)
Marcus Bontempelli	Western Bulldogs	18 years, 147 days	5	16	15	Pick 4 (2013 National Draft)
Mitch Hallahan	Hawthorn	21 years, 217 days	5	6	2	Pick 38 (2010 National Draft)
Jeremy McGovern	West Coast	22 years, 11 days	6	13	13	Pick 44 (2011 Rookie Draft), son of Andrew McGovern
Christian Salem	Melbourne	18 years, 285 days	6	12	6	Pick 9 (2013 National Draft)
Billy Hartung	Hawthorn	19 years, 100 days	7	7	3	Pick 24 (2013 National Draft)
Blake Acres	St Kilda	18 years, 208 days	7	3	1	Pick 19 (2013 National Draft), round 6 nomination 2016 AFL Rising Star
Ben Newton	Port Adelaide	21 years, 268 days	7	4	0	Pick 35 (2010 National Draft)
Charlie Cameron	Adelaide	19 years, 314 days	9	7	9	Pick 7 (2014 Rookie Draft)
Ben Lennon	Richmond	18 years, 316 days	9	7	2	Pick 12 (2013 National Draft)
Jed Bews	Geelong	20 years, 154 days	9	7	0	Pick 86 (2011 National Draft), son of Andrew Bews
Zac O'Brien	Brisbane Lions	23 years, 216 days	11	5	1	Pick 23 (2014 Rookie Draft)
Luke Lowden	Hawthorn	23 years, 106 days	12	1	3	Pick 63 (2008 National Draft)
Rory Lobb	Greater Western Sydney	21 years, 119 days	12	2	1	Pick 29 (2013 National Draft)
Cam Ellis-Yolmen	Adelaide	21 years, 132 days	12	1	0	Pick 64 (2011 National Draft)
Brad Hartman	Geelong	19 years, 211 days	13	5	1	Pick 77 (2012 National Draft)
Darcy Lang	Geelong	18 years, 206 days	13	1	1	Pick 16 (2013 National Draft)
Tim Broomhead	Collingwood	20 years, 86 days	13	8	9	Pick 20 (2012 National Draft)
Zak Jones	Sydney	19 years, 98 days	14	4	1	Pick 15 (2013 National Draft)
Shane Kersten	Geelong	21 years, 99 days	14	9	10	Pick 34 (2011 National Draft)
Ben Brown	North Melbourne	21 years, 214 days	14	11	18	Pick 47 (2013 National Draft)
Daniel McStay	Brisbane Lions	19 years, 4 days	15	9	7	Pick 25 (2013 National Draft)
Max Warren	North Melbourne	21 years, 151 days	15	1	0	Pick 10 (2011 Rookie Draft)
Mitch Honeychurch	Western Bulldogs	19 years, 120 days	15	3	1	Pick 60 (2013 National Draft), round 2 nomination 2015 AFL Rising Star
Dom Barry	Melbourne	20 years, 115 days	15	5	0	Received in trade, 2012
Blaine Johnson	Carlton	18 years, 336 days	15	5	1	Pick 43 (2014 Rookie Draft)
Michael Apeness	Fremantle	19 years, 159 days	16	2	0	Pick 17 (2013 National Draft)
Jack Redpath	Western Bulldogs	23 years, 205 days	16	3	2	Pick 62 (2012 Rookie Draft)
Dean Towers	Sydney	24 years, 70 days	17	6	3	Pick 22 (2012 National Draft)
Louis Herbert	Gold Coast	20 years, 30 days	18	3	0	Pick 4 (2014 Rookie Draft)
Alex Woodward	Hawthorn	21 years, 46 days	18	2	0	Pick 53 (2011 National Draft)
Tim Membrey	Sydney	20 years, 68 days	19	1	0	Pick 46 (2012 National Draft)
Orazio Fantasia	Essendon	18 years, 328 days	20	3	0	Pick 55 (2013 National Draft)
Kayne Turner	North Melbourne	18 years, 221 days	20	6	8	Pick 25 (2014 Rookie Draft)
Ciarán Sheehan	Carlton	19 years, 246 days	20	4	0	Pick 60 (2014 Rookie Draft)
Max Duffy	Fremantle	21 years, 121 days	20	2	2	Pick 39 (2012 National Draft)
Jonathan Freeman	Brisbane Lions	20 years, 106 days	20	4	6	Pick 62 (Academy selection) (2013 National Draft)
Ariel Steinberg	Essendon	21 years, 355 days	21	3	0	Pick 31 (2010 National Draft), redrafted pick 8 (2013 Rookie Draft)
Nick Holman	Carlton	19 years, 85 days	22	1	0	Pick 51 (2013 National Draft)
Jack Leslie	Gold Coast	19 years, 118 days	22	2	0	Pick 20 (2013 National Draft)
Jackson Ramsay	Collingwood	19 years, 276 days	22	2	0	Pick 38 (2012 National Draft)
Spencer White	St Kilda	19 years, 336 days	22	2	4	Pick 25 (2012 National Draft)
Corey Gault	Collingwood	21 years, 305 days	23	1	2	Pick 65 (2011 National Draft)
Sam Naismith	Sydney	22 years, 45 days	23	1	0	Pick 58 (2013 Rookie Draft)
Mason Wood	North Melbourne	20 years, 351 days	23	1	3	Pick 41 (2012 National Draft)
Jordon Bourke	Brisbane Lions	19 years, 292 days	23	1	0	Pick 56 (2013 Rookie Draft)
Cam McCarthy	Greater Western Sydney	19 years, 153 days	23	1	1	Pick 14 (2013 National Draft)

== Change of AFL club ==
Name	Club	Age at debut	Debut round	Games (in 2014)	Goals (in 2014)	Notes
Taylor Adams	Collingwood	20 years, 175 days	1	12	2	Previously played for Greater Western Sydney, Received in trade, 2013
Lance Franklin	Sydney	27 years, 44 days	1	21	75	Previously played for Hawthorn, Received during free agency, 2013
Jeremy Laidler	Sydney	24 years, 222 days	1	19	3	Previously played for Carlton & Geelong, Received during free agency, 2013
Shane Mumford	Greater Western Sydney	27 years, 253 days	1	17	4	Previously played for Sydney & Geelong, Received in trade, 2013
Heath Shaw	Greater Western Sydney	28 years, 108 days	1	18	0	Previously played for Collingwood, Received in trade, 2013
Josh Hunt	Greater Western Sydney	32 years, 1 day	1	14	4	Previously played for Geelong, Received in trade, 2013
Dylan Addison	Greater Western Sydney	26 years, 159 days	1	5	0	Previously played for Western Bulldogs, Received during free agency, 2013
Shaun Hampson	Richmond	25 years, 349 days	1	11	1	Previously played for Carlton, Received in trade, 2013
Matt Thomas	Richmond	27 years, 6 days	1	13	4	Previously played for Port Adelaide, Pick 42, 2014 Rookie Draft
Matt White	Port Adelaide	26 years, 335 days	1	22	25	Previously played for Richmond, Received during free agency, 2013
Jared Polec	Port Adelaide	21 years, 155 days	1	24	17	Previously played for Brisbane Lions, Received in trade, 2013
Dale Thomas	Carlton	26 years, 268 days	1	20	12	Previously played for Collingwood, Received during free agency, 2013
Andrejs Everitt	Carlton	25 years, 3 days	1	17	13	Previously played for Sydney & Western Bulldogs, Received in trade, 2013
Hamish McIntosh	Geelong	29 years, 196 days	1	19	7	Previously played for North Melbourne, Received in trade, 2012
Eddie Betts	Adelaide	27 years, 113 days	1	22	51	Previously played for Carlton, Received during free agency, 2013
James Podsiadly	Adelaide	32 years, 190 days	1	21	26	Previously played for Geelong, Received in trade, 2013
Nick Dal Santo	North Melbourne	29 years, 28 days	1	25	9	Previously played for St Kilda, Received during free agency, 2013
Paul Chapman	Essendon	32 years, 137 days	1	20	22	Previously played for Geelong, Received in trade, 2013
Ben McEvoy	Hawthorn	24 years, 254 days	1	12	6	Previously played for St Kilda, Received in trade, 2013
Trent West	Brisbane Lions	26 years, 156 days	1	10	4	Previously played for Geelong, Received in trade, 2013
Shane Savage	St Kilda	23 years, 76 days	1	14	3	Previously played for Hawthorn, Received in trade, 2013
Luke Delaney	St Kilda	24 years, 271 days	1	22	0	Previously played for North Melbourne, Received in trade, 2013
Bernie Vince	Melbourne	28 years, 171 days	1	22	13	Previously played for Adelaide, Received in trade, 2013
Daniel Cross	Melbourne	30 years, 357 days	1	17	1	Previously played for Western Bulldogs, Received during free agency, 2013
Viv Michie	Melbourne	22 years, 30 days	1	6	0	Previously played for Fremantle, Received in trade, 2013
Dom Tyson	Melbourne	20 years, 287 days	1	22	16	Previously played for Greater Western Sydney, Received in trade, 2013
Stewart Crameri	Western Bulldogs	25 years, 225 days	1	22	37	Previously played for Essendon, Received in trade, 2013
Elliot Yeo	West Coast	20 years, 173 days	1	13	2	Previously played for Brisbane Lions, Received in trade, 2013
Xavier Ellis	West Coast	26 years, 23 days	1	17	7	Previously played for Hawthorn, Received during free agency, 2013
Jamie Bennell	West Coast	23 years, 289 days	1	19	1	Previously played for Melbourne, Pick 26 (2013 Rookie Draft)
Tom Derickx	Sydney	26 years, 112 days	2	12	5	Previously played for Richmond, Received during free agency, 2013
Jesse White	Collingwood	26 years, 80 days	2	18	20	Previously played for Sydney, Received in trade, 2013
Nathan Gordon	Richmond	24 years, 52 days	3	12	11	Previously played for Sydney, Pick 50 (2013 National Draft)
Jackson Paine	Brisbane Lions	20 years, 295 days	4	6	3	Previously played for Collingwood, Received in trade, 2013
Jed Lamb	Greater Western Sydney	21 years, 175 days	4	8	6	Previously played for Sydney, Pick 1 (2014 Pre-season draft)
Robin Nahas	North Melbourne	26 years, 154 days	4	8	7	Previously played for Richmond, Received during free agency, 2013
Billy Longer	St Kilda	20 years, 336 days	4	16	1	Previously played for Brisbane Lions, Received in trade, 2013
Luke McGuane	Brisbane Lions	27 years, 65 days	5	3	0	Previously played for Richmond, Received during free agency, 2013
Josh Bruce	St Kilda	21 years, 315 days	5	10	4	Previously played for Greater Western Sydney, Received in trade, 2013
Joel Tippett	North Melbourne	25 years, 181 days	6	4	0	Previously played for Gold Coast, Pick 8 (2014 Rookie Draft)
Sam Docherty	Carlton	20 years, 197 days	7	16	7	Previously played for Brisbane Lions, Received in trade, 2013
Maverick Weller	St Kilda	22 years, 80 days	7	16	3	Previously played for Gold Coast, Pick 20 (2014 Rookie Draft)
Kurt Aylett	Essendon	22 years, 38 days	8	2	0	Previously played for Greater Western Sydney, Received in trade, 2013
Aidan Riley	Melbourne	22 years, 155 days	9	9	3	Previously played for Adelaide, Received during free agency, 2013
Anthony Miles	Richmond	22 years, 101 days	12	13	5	Previously played for Greater Western Sydney, Pick 27 (2014 Rookie Draft)
Ben Ross	Hawthorn	25 years, 265 days	13	4	1	Previously played for North Melbourne, Pick 57 (2014 Rookie Draft)
Colin Sylvia	Fremantle	28 years, 218 days	13	6	1	Previously played for Melbourne, Received during free agency, 2013
Sam Darley	Western Bulldogs	21 years, 135 days	15	5	1	Previously played for Greater Western Sydney, Received in trade, 2013
Cameron Wood	Carlton	27 years, 137 days	18	6	2	Previously played for Brisbane Lions & Collingwood, Pick 28 (2014 Rookie Draft)
Tony Armstrong	Collingwood	24 years, 308 days	19	5	0	Previously played for Adelaide & Sydney, Received during free agency, 2013
