= 2019 West Coast Eagles season =

West Coast Eagles
2019 season
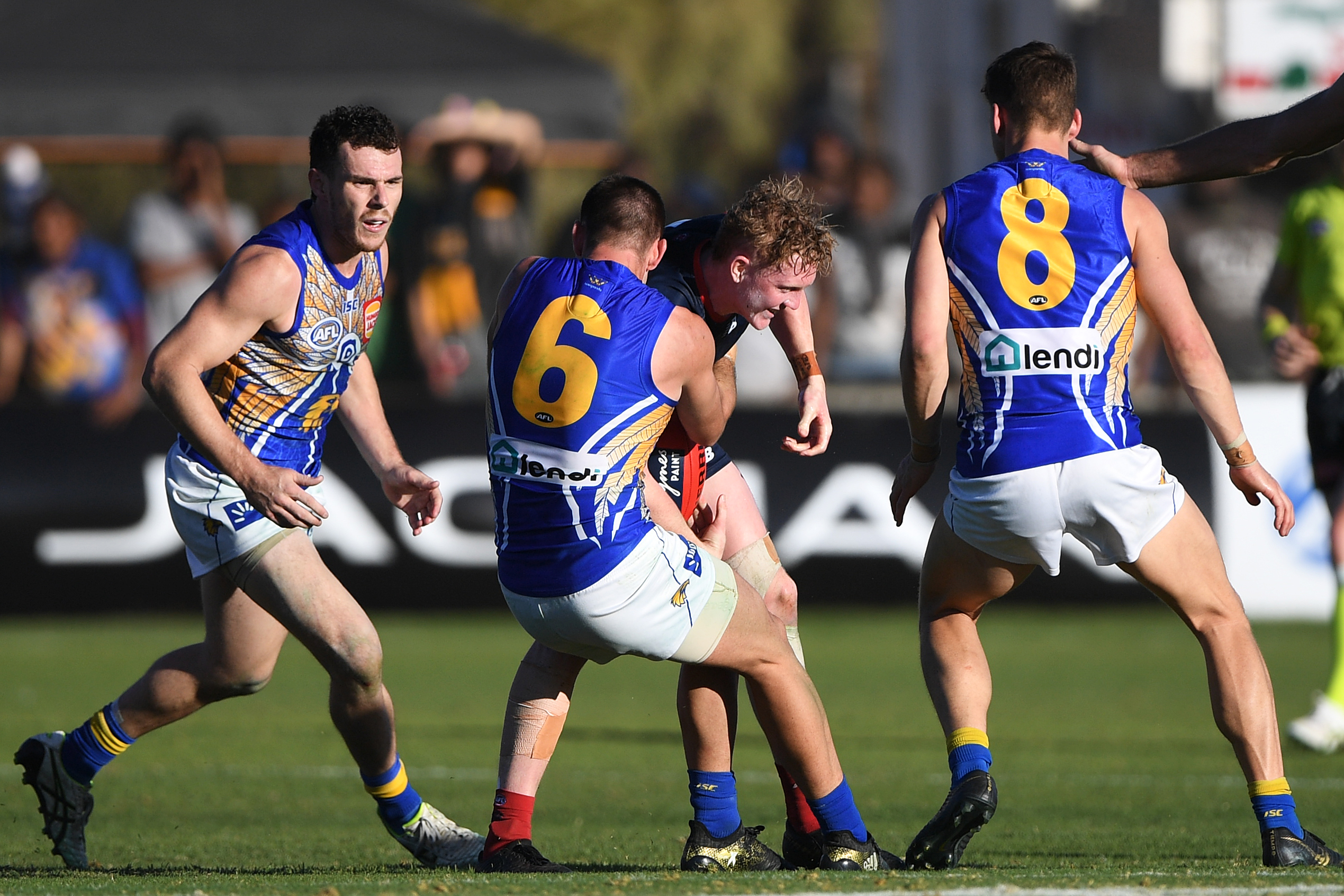
- Elliot Yeo tackling Melbourne's Clayton Oliver during their round 18 match.
- Coach: Adam Simpson (6th season)
- Captains: Shannon Hurn (5th season)
- Home ground: Optus Stadium
- Best and Fairest: Luke Shuey
- Leading goalkicker: Jack Darling (59)
- Highest home attendance: 59,216 vs. Essendon (Elimination final)
- Lowest home attendance: 47,497 vs. Gold Coast (round 7)
- Club membership: 90,445

The West Coast Eagles are an Australian rules football team based in Perth, Western Australia. Their 2019 season was their 33rd season in the Australian Football League (AFL), their sixth season under coach Adam Simpson, and their fifth and final season with Shannon Hurn as captain. Having won the 2018 AFL Grand Final, expectations were that West Coast would finish in the top four on the ladder. They won only three of their first six games, losing by greater than 40 points to the Brisbane Lions, Port Adelaide and Geelong, placing the Eagles 12th on the ladder at the end of round six. They then won 12 of their next 14 games, the losses being to Sydney by 45 points and to Collingwood by 1 point. By the end of round 21, West Coast had been in the top four since round 14, and were aiming to finish in the top two. They then had a disappointing six-point loss to Richmond, and a shock 38-point loss to Hawthorn at home, to finish the season fifth on the ladder. This meant West Coast missed out on the double chance that top four teams get in the AFL finals, significantly lowering their chances of winning the Grand Final. In the 2019 AFL finals series, they faced Essendon in an elimination final, beating them by 55 points, before losing to Geelong in a semi-final by 20 points, ending West Coast's season.

Notable events include Daniel Venables suffering a career-ending concussion in round nine, Nic Naitanui returning from injury in round 15, having been out since round 17, 2018, and Willie Rioli being provisionally suspended before the semi-final after tampering with a drug test. Jack Darling, who kicked 59 goals, was the club's leading goal-scorer for the third time in his career. Darling, Hurn, Jeremy McGovern and Elliot Yeo were selected for the 2020 All-Australian team. Liam Ryan won Mark of the Year for a mark he took in round nine against Melbourne. Luke Shuey was West Coast's best and fairest player, winning the John Worsfold Medal. West Coast fielded a reserves team in the West Australian Football League for the first time in 2019.

== Background ==
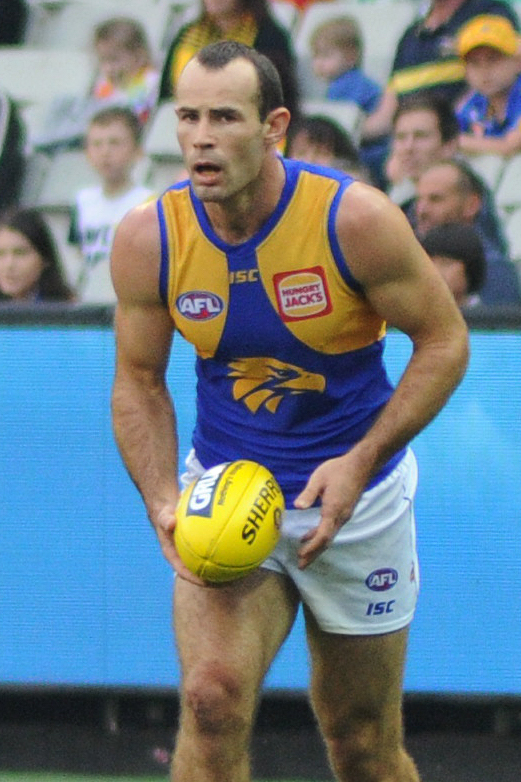
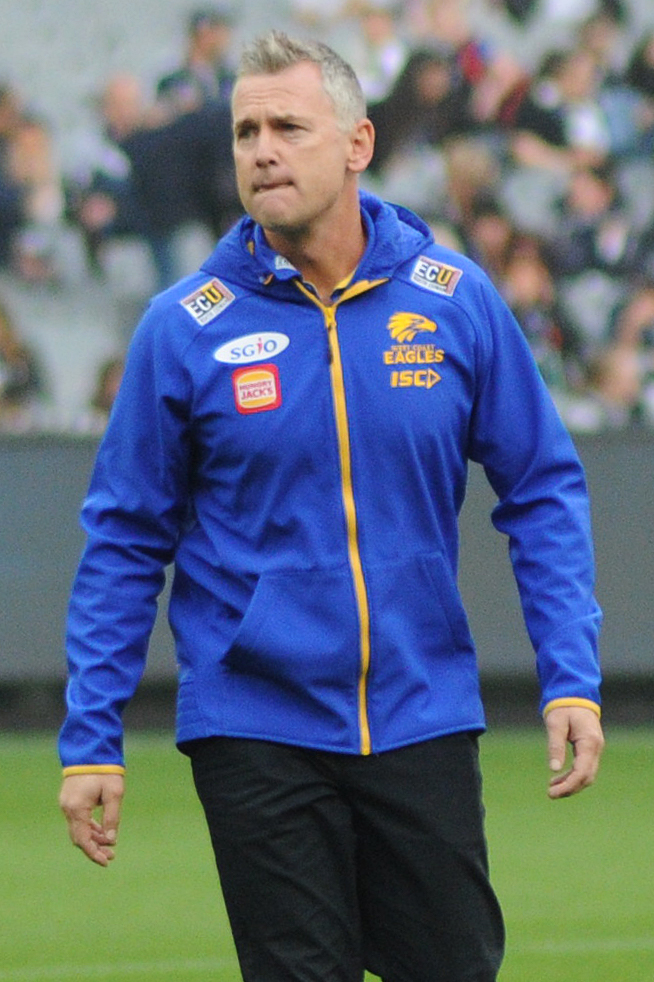
Shannon Hurn (captain) and Adam Simpson (coach)

The West Coast Eagles are an Australian rules football team based in Perth, Western Australia, that competes in the Australian Football League (AFL). They finished the 2018 home-and-away season second on the ladder. Continuing on through the finals series, they won the Grand Final against Collingwood by five points, thus becoming the reigning premiers.

Prior to the start of the 2019 season, most of a group of 15 AFL.com.au reporters predicted that West Coast would finish the season in the top four again. However, only Travis King predicted they would win the premiership, with most reporters predicting Richmond would do so instead. All eight members of a group of Western Australia-based people from Nine Entertainment predicted that West Coast would finish in the top four, and three of them predicted West Coast would win the premiership.

In October 2018, it was announced that the West Australian Football League (WAFL) had decided to allow the West Coast Eagles to enter a reserve team into that competition starting in 2019, after the idea was unanimously endorsed by a meeting of WAFL club presidents. The Eagles paid a one-off licence fee of $90,000, which was split evenly between the nine other WAFL clubs, as well an annual fee of $800,000, to be spent in various areas. This was an increase on the previous $467,000 annual fee for aligning with East Perth Football Club, which allowed Eagles players to play for East Perth; the five-year agreement with East Perth had been mutually terminated in 2018. West Coast said the new arrangement would benefit its players that missed out on selection in AFL games or who were coming back from injury and wanted to play in the less intense WAFL games first. As part of the agreement, West Coast played all their WAFL home games at their opponents' home ground.

West Coast's on-field leadership went unchanged going into the 2019 season. Shannon Hurn remained captain for his fifth year, Josh Kennedy and Luke Shuey remained as vice-captains, and Nic Naitanui, Jeremy McGovern and Andrew Gaff rounded out the leadership group. Adam Simpson was senior coach for a sixth season. The assistant coaches were Jaymie Graham (forwards), Nathan van Berlo (midfield), Daniel Pratt (backs), Adrian Hickmott (contested ball coordinator), and Matt Rosa (stoppages and structure). The head of development was Gavin Bell. The other development coaches were Chance Bateman (forwards), Luke Webster (midfield), and Mark Nicoski (backs). Webster was also the coach of West Coast's WAFL team.

In March, Sam Kerr, the captain of Australia's women's national soccer team, was announced to be West Coast's number-one ticket holder for 2019–20. West Coast's major sponsors for 2019 were fast food outlet Hungry Jack's and online mortgage broker Lendi. West Coast had 90,445 members in 2019, which was the club's record. This was the second highest number of memberships out of the eighteen AFL teams in 2019.

== Playing list ==
=== 2018 off-season changes ===
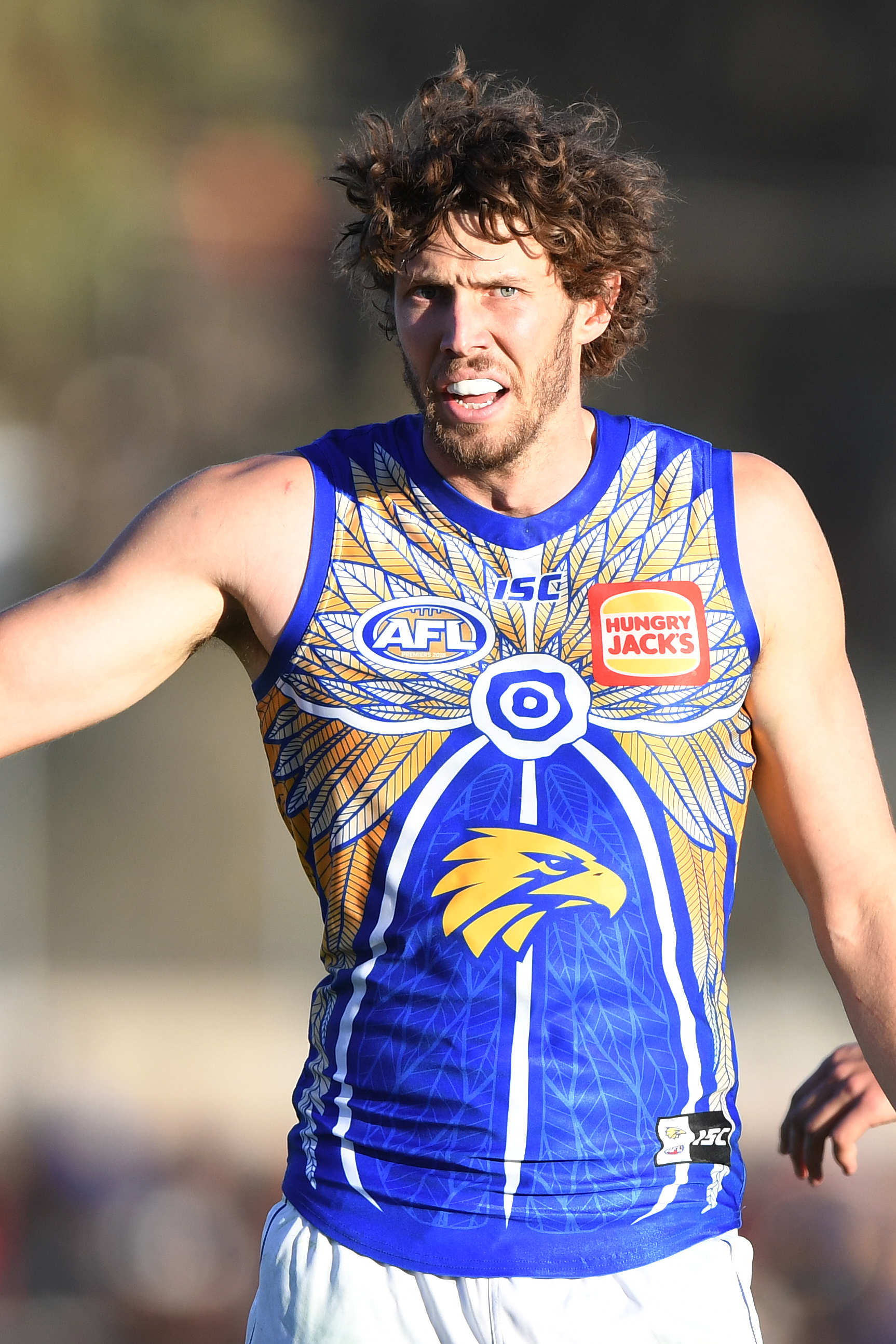
Tom Hickey joined West Coast from St Kilda during the off-season trade period.

After the end of the 2018 AFL season, Eric Mackenzie retired due to consistent struggles with fractures in his feet. Mark LeCras also retired, saying it was the right time, after becoming a premiership player in his 14th season with the Eagles. Scott Lycett left the club under the AFL's free agency rules, taking an offer from Port Adelaide in his home state of South Australia. West Coast received a pick at the end of the first round of the 2018 draft as compensation. Malcolm Karpany and Luke Partington were delisted after having played no games in the 2018 season. Ryan Burrows, Callan England, Tony Olango and Tarir Bayok, who were all on the rookie list and did not play any AFL games, were also delisted.

On 7 October 2018, the day before the start of the 2018 trade period, Andrew Gaff signed a new contract with West Coast, after much consideration to leaving under the AFL's free agency rules. Having been suspended for eight weeks near the end of the 2018 season for striking Fremantle player Andrew Brayshaw in the jaw, Gaff was considering signing a contract with a club based in Victoria, his home state. Six clubs looked at potentially recruiting Gaff, including North Melbourne, who offered him a seven-year long deal worth about $8 million. In the end, he chose to stay with West Coast, in the hopes of winning a premiership, signing a contract there worth less than the North Melbourne one.

West Coast were one of the least active teams during the 2018 trade period, making one trade. Obtaining an experienced ruckman to replace Lycett while Nic Naitanui was recovering from injury was West Coast's top trade priority. They did that by giving St Kilda pick 39 and a 2019 fourth-round pick in exchange for Tom Hickey, pick 60 and a 2019 fourth-round pick. West Coast were also aiming for a trade with Geelong for Tim Kelly, who wanted to return to his home state of Western Australia. The Eagles offered picks 20, 22 and a 2019 second-round pick to Geelong, but the two teams could not reach an agreement. West Coast's list manager Brady Rawlings said they will try to get a Tim Kelly trade done the following year, when he is out of contract. AFL.com.au rated West Coast's trade period an 8/10, saying that "Andrew Gaff's recommitment on the eve of the Trade Period meant anything else was a bonus." It also said that although the Eagles failed in a trade for Tim Kelly, it was good that they did not trade away the large number of picks that Geelong wanted in return. Fox Sports gave the trade period a "C" grade, with Nick Dal Santo saying "it was a good get because they had to get a ruckman. Tom Hickey is not a premium ruck, we completely understand that ...", and "... their biggest get this year was keeping Andrew Gaff."

The Eagles made three trades during the draft. The first trade had West Coast receive pick 29 from Sydney in exchange for a 2019 third-round pick. That was the first ever trade of draft picks during the draft, as that year was the first time it was allowed. The second trade had West Coast receive a 2019 second-round pick for sending Sydney pick 25. Their last trade involved Gold Coast giving West Coast picks 27 and 32 for West Coast's pick 23 and a 2019 fifth-round pick. In the draft, West Coast chose Xavier O'Neill (pick 28), Luke Foley (pick 31), Bailey Williams (pick 35) and Jarrod Cameron (pick 39). In the rookie draft, West Coast chose Harry Edwards (pick 18) and Josh Smith (pick 34), passing on pick 46. Patrick Bines and Brodie Riach, who both have a background in basketball, joined West Coast as category B rookies. Keegan Brooksby, who played for Gold Coast between 2015 and 2017, joined the club in the supplementary selection period, which allows clubs to select players who are previous AFL players that have not been in the AFL for over a year. AFL.com.au's Callum Twomey and Riley Beveridge complimented the Eagles on the trades they made during the draft. ESPN rated West Coast's draft a "B+".

Removals from playing list
Player	Reason	Games	Ref.
Eric Mackenzie	Retired	147	
Scott Lycett	Restricted free agent (to Port Adelaide)	75	
Mark LeCras	Retired	219	
Malcolm Karpany	Delisted	7	
Luke Partington	Delisted	6	
Ryan Burrows	Delisted	0	
Callan England	Delisted	0	
Tony Olango	Delisted	0	
Tarir Bayok	Delisted	0	

Additions to playing list
Player	Acquired	Former club	Former league	Ref.
Patrick Bines	Category B rookie	—N/a	—N/a	
Brodie Riach	Category B rookie	—N/a	—N/a	
Tom Hickey	Traded from St Kilda	St Kilda	AFL	
Keegan Brooksby	Supplementary selection period	South Adelaide	SANFL	
Xavier O'Neill	No. 28, 2018 national draft	Oakleigh Chargers	TAC Cup	
Luke Foley	No. 31, 2018 national draft	Subiaco	WAFL	
Bailey Williams	No. 35, 2018 national draft	Dandenong Stingrays	TAC Cup	
Jarrod Cameron	No. 39, 2018 national draft	Swan Districts	WAFL	
Harry Edwards	No. 18, 2019 rookie draft	Swan Districts	WAFL	
Josh Smith	No. 34, 2019 rookie draft	Collingwood	AFL	

=== Statistics ===
Playing list and statistics
Player	No.	Games	Goals	Behinds	Kicks	Handballs	Disposals	Marks	Tackles	Notes/Milestone(s)
Liam Ryan	1	24	30	19	211	70	281	72	51	
Jake Waterman	2	13	15	5	112	45	157	75	16	
Andrew Gaff	3	22	3	1	437	265	702	141	52	
Dom Sheed	4	24	16	15	344	291	635	128	39	
Brad Sheppard	5	24	0	2	324	139	463	188	37	
Elliot Yeo	6	23	11	12	323	223	546	84	169	
Chris Masten	7	17	3	1	168	114	282	93	30	200th AFL game (round 2)
Jack Redden	8	23	0	4	251	277	528	111	129	
Nic Naitanui	9	5	0	2	37	25	62	7	17	
Jarrod Brander	10	2	0	2	14	4	18	8	1	
Oscar Allen	12	21	20	11	134	79	213	75	58	
Luke Shuey	13	24	8	2	409	238	647	81	129	200th AFL game (Elimination final)
Liam Duggan	14	15	0	1	174	65	239	85	26	
Jamie Cripps	15	19	30	13	145	113	258	59	64	
Tom Hickey	16	20	9	2	120	129	249	58	51	
Josh Kennedy	17	22	49	29	132	51	183	89	39	200th AFL game (round 2); 600 AFL goals (round 19)
Daniel Venables	18	6	2	1	27	29	56	18	16	
Nathan Vardy	19	11	0	0	30	42	72	17	30	
Jeremy McGovern	20	23	1	1	242	101	343	164	36	
Jack Petruccelle	21	20	21	15	143	60	203	70	38	
Hamish Brayshaw	22	0	—N/a	—N/a	—N/a	—N/a	—N/a	—N/a	—N/a	
Lewis Jetta	23	22	0	0	283	93	376	82	33	
Xavier O'Neill	24	0	—N/a	—N/a	—N/a	—N/a	—N/a	—N/a	—N/a	
Shannon Hurn	25	21	0	2	386	104	490	154	31	250th AFL game (round 2)
Francis Watson	26	2	0	0	19	8	27	12	5	Rookie, AFL debut (round 18)
Jack Darling	27	24	59	18	203	84	287	112	64	
Tom Cole	28	14	0	0	107	53	160	67	47	
Luke Foley	29	0	—N/a	—N/a	—N/a	—N/a	—N/a	—N/a	—N/a	
Jackson Nelson	30	13	0	0	103	49	152	47	23	
Will Schofield	31	14	0	0	80	37	117	48	22	
Bailey Williams	32	0	—N/a	—N/a	—N/a	—N/a	—N/a	—N/a	—N/a	
Brayden Ainsworth	33	0	—N/a	—N/a	—N/a	—N/a	—N/a	—N/a	—N/a	
Mark Hutchings	34	18	1	5	130	85	215	52	42	
Josh Rotham	35	4	0	0	34	15	49	24	6	AFL debut (round 3)
Fraser McInnes	36	0	—N/a	—N/a	—N/a	—N/a	—N/a	—N/a	—N/a	Rookie
Tom Barrass	37	14	0	0	131	30	161	86	11	
Kurt Mutimer	38	0	—N/a	—N/a	—N/a	—N/a	—N/a	—N/a	—N/a	
Jarrod Cameron	39	7	11	2	35	18	53	14	28	AFL debut (round 14)
Keegan Brooksby	40	0	—N/a	—N/a	—N/a	—N/a	—N/a	—N/a	—N/a	Rookie
Brendon Ah Chee	41	1	1	0	11	4	15	7	0	
Harry Edwards	42	0	—N/a	—N/a	—N/a	—N/a	—N/a	—N/a	—N/a	Rookie
Matthew Allen	43	0	—N/a	—N/a	—N/a	—N/a	—N/a	—N/a	—N/a	
Willie Rioli	44	14	18	10	121	65	186	47	42	
Josh Smith	45	2	1	1	13	10	23	9	0	West Coast debut (round 2)
Brodie Riach	46	0	—N/a	—N/a	—N/a	—N/a	—N/a	—N/a	—N/a	Rookie
Patrick Bines	47	0	—N/a	—N/a	—N/a	—N/a	—N/a	—N/a	—N/a	Rookie

== Season summary ==
In the 2019 AFL season, each team played 22 games and had a mid-season bye. West Coast played Adelaide, Collingwood, Fremantle, Hawthorn and Melbourne twice, and the other teams once each. The teams that West Coast played twice were regarded as tough to beat before the start of the season. West Coast had an increase in prime time scheduled games compared to the 2018 season, with three Friday night games at home and a Thursday night game at home. They also had only six six-day breaks, and three matches at the Melbourne Cricket Ground (MCG), their equal highest number of matches there since 2005. As part of their pre-season, West Coast played Geelong and Fremantle in the JLT Community Series. West Coast beat both teams.

=== Rounds 1–12 ===
Going into the start of the season, Nic Naitanui, Andrew Gaff, Jamie Cripps, Josh Kennedy and Willie Rioli were unable to play. Naitanui had been out indefinitely since tearing his left anterior cruciate ligament in round 17, 2018. Gaff had been out due to an eight match ban received for striking Fremantle player Andrew Brayshaw in the jaw in round 20, 2018. Cripps, Kennedy and Rioli were out due to foot injuries. West Coast's first match of the regular season was against the Brisbane Lions at the Gabba on 23 March. The humidity was high, which made for wet and slippery conditions. The Lions, who finished 15th on the ladder in 2018, beat the Eagles by 44 points. West Coast started well, kicking six goals to Brisbane's one in the first quarter, but the Eagles kicked only two goals after that, compared to Brisbane's fourteen. It was the greatest defeat of an AFL reigning premier in round one since Richmond were beaten by Carlton by 62 points in 1981. Brisbane went on to finish the season second on the ladder, however at the time, Brisbane were regarded by most as a team that West Coast should have comfortably beaten. Liam Ryan was reported to the Match Review Panel for striking Darcy Gardiner in the final minutes of the match. He received a $2,500 fine and no ban.

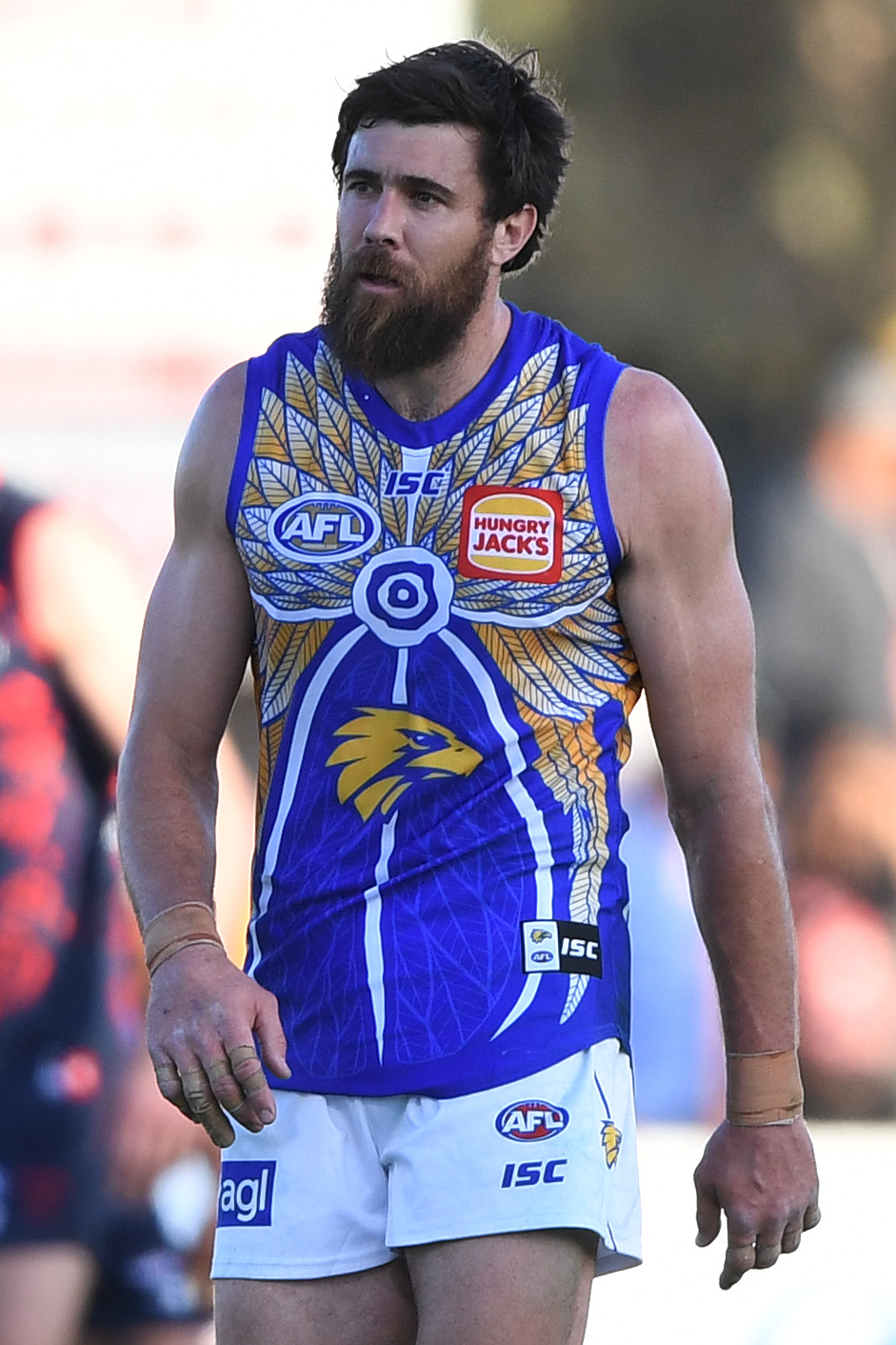
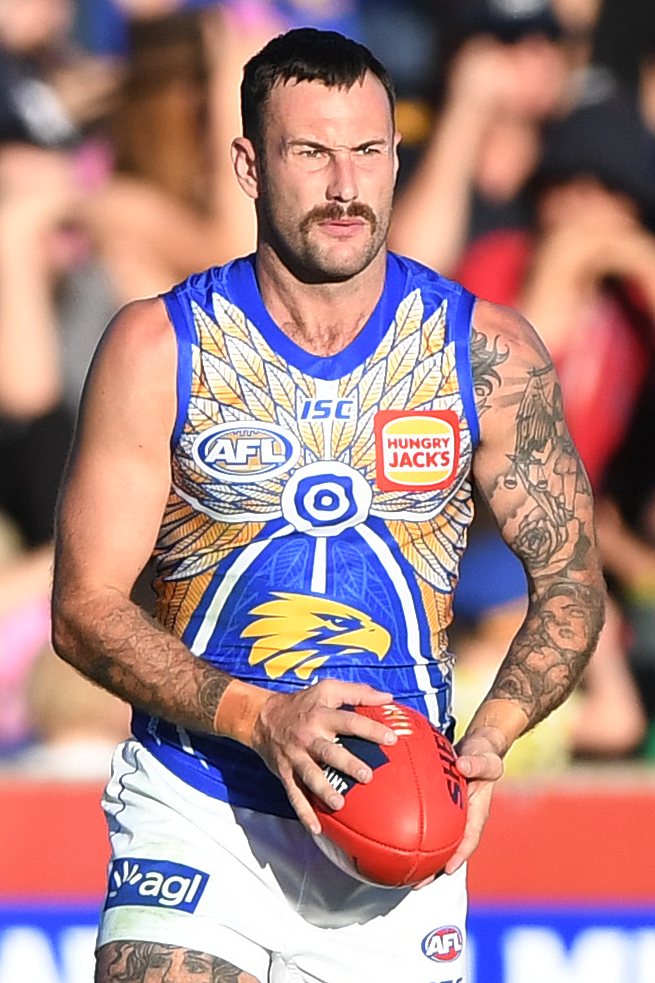
Josh Kennedy and Chris Masten played their 200th AFL game in round two.

West Coast won their next match, beating Greater Western Sydney by 52 points at Optus Stadium. The Eagles unfurled their premiership flag in celebration of 2018's grand final victory. Josh Kennedy made a return from a foot injury, and Josh Smith made his West Coast debut, having played for Collingwood previously. The match was Shannon Hurn's 250th AFL match, and Kennedy's and Chris Masten's 200th AFL match. The first grand final rematch was in round three, resulting in a 20-point win over Collingwood at the MCG. Andrew Gaff returned from his suspension and Jamie Cripps returned from injury. Both played quite well, with Gaff having 34 disposals and Cripps kicking four goals. Luke Shuey played well too, having 24 disposals. Liam Duggan did not play due to a knee injury, with Josh Rotham making his AFL debut as replacement. In response to that match, AFL.com.au's Riley Beveridge declared that West Coast "remained the team to beat in 2019". In round four was the season's first Western Derby, the biannual home-and-away match between West Coast and their cross-town rivals Fremantle. West Coast won by 10 points, having led for the entire match. However, there were a few times where the Dockers were potentially going to get in front, with West Coast being unable to build up a substantial margin. Shannon Hurn won the Glendinning–Allan Medal for the third time.

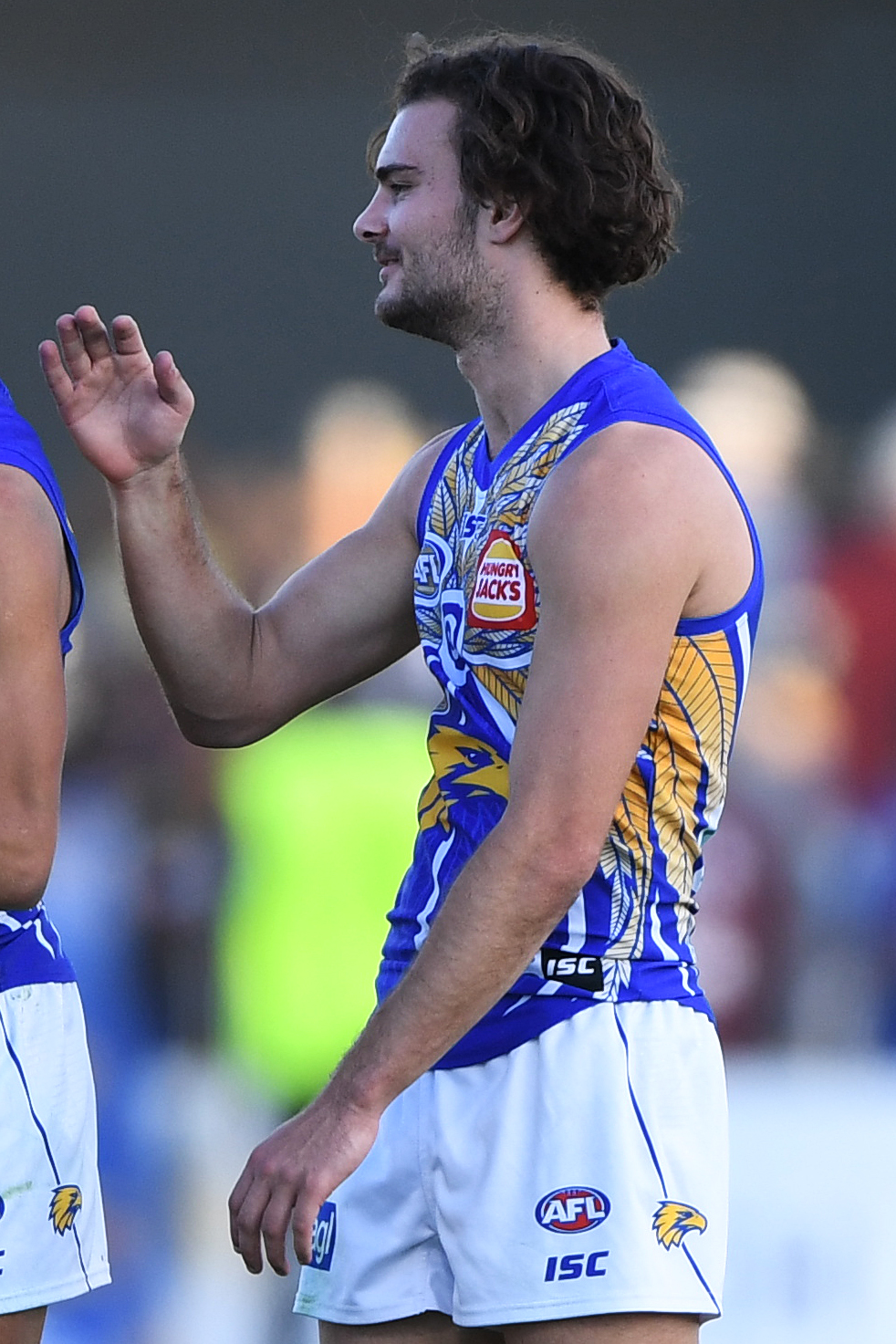
Jack Petruccelle received a Rising Star nomination for his five-goal effort in round five.

The Eagles had their second loss of the season in round five against Port Adelaide, being beaten by 42 points at Optus Stadium. The match was played in heavy rain, which was a weakness for West Coast. One of the only highlights for the Eagles was Jack Petruccelle, who kicked five goals. He received a Rising Star award nomination for this match. In round six, West Coast suffered a 58-point loss to Geelong at GMHBA Stadium, leaving them 12th on the ladder at the end of the round, well below expectations. The Eagles won again in round seven, albeit unconvincingly. West Coast beat the Gold Coast Suns, the eventual wooden spooners, 80–57. West Coast had a lead of 42 points midway through the third quarter, but that narrowed down to just 11 points near the end of the final quarter, with the Suns kicking five goals in a row. The Eagles held off a potential comeback to win by 23 points. The following round, West Coast moved back into the top eight due to an 18-point win against St Kilda. Saints fans were angry at the 7–3 free-kick count for the first half, including two free kicks that resulted in West Coast goals. The Eagles' final quarter was lacklustre, kicking only one goal and eight behinds, but they held on to win 88–70.

West Coast then won their round nine match against Melbourne, despite the Demons dominating the first three quarters. The Eagles kicked seven of the final eight goals to win by 22 points. Liam Ryan took a spectacular mark on top of 208-centimetre (6 ft 10 in) Melbourne ruckman Max Gawn, before kicking a goal to give West Coast the lead in the final ten minutes. Ryan went on to win the Mark of the Year award for that. The match was also Willie Rioli's first match since the 2018 Grand Final, having had a foot stress fracture since the pre-season. Daniel Venables had to be stretchered off the ground after being knocked out in the second quarter. He then missed the rest of the season and retired in 2021 as a result of his concussion. Lewis Jetta was suspended for one match due to a sling tackle on Tim Smith.

The Eagles had another comeback victory in round ten, this time against Adelaide. The Crows entered half time 28 points ahead of West Coast, who kicked no goals in the second quarter, compared to Adelaide, who had five. West Coast dominated the rest of the match though, kicking ten goals in the second half, compared to Adelaide's three. The Eagles ended up as 11 point winners. In round 11, West Coast moved into the top four and increased their percentage (Note: Percentage is the ratio of points scored vs points conceded over a season.) considerably by defeating the Western Bulldogs 133–72. Jack Darling had six goals, Andrew Gaff had 36 touches, Jeremy McGovern had eight marks and Brad Sheppard had 22 disposals. The only injury was to Shannon Hurn, who suffered a hamstring strain, missing only the following game against Sydney. The Eagles' five-match winning streak ended in round 12, when Sydney beat West Coast 116–71. The Eagles were very unlikely to win from half time onwards. The loss continued West Coast's 20 year and eight match losing streak at the Sydney Cricket Ground. Willie Rioli and Nathan Vardy both received a one match suspension for rough conduct against Colin O'Riordan and Jackson Thurlow respectively.

=== Rounds 13–23 ===
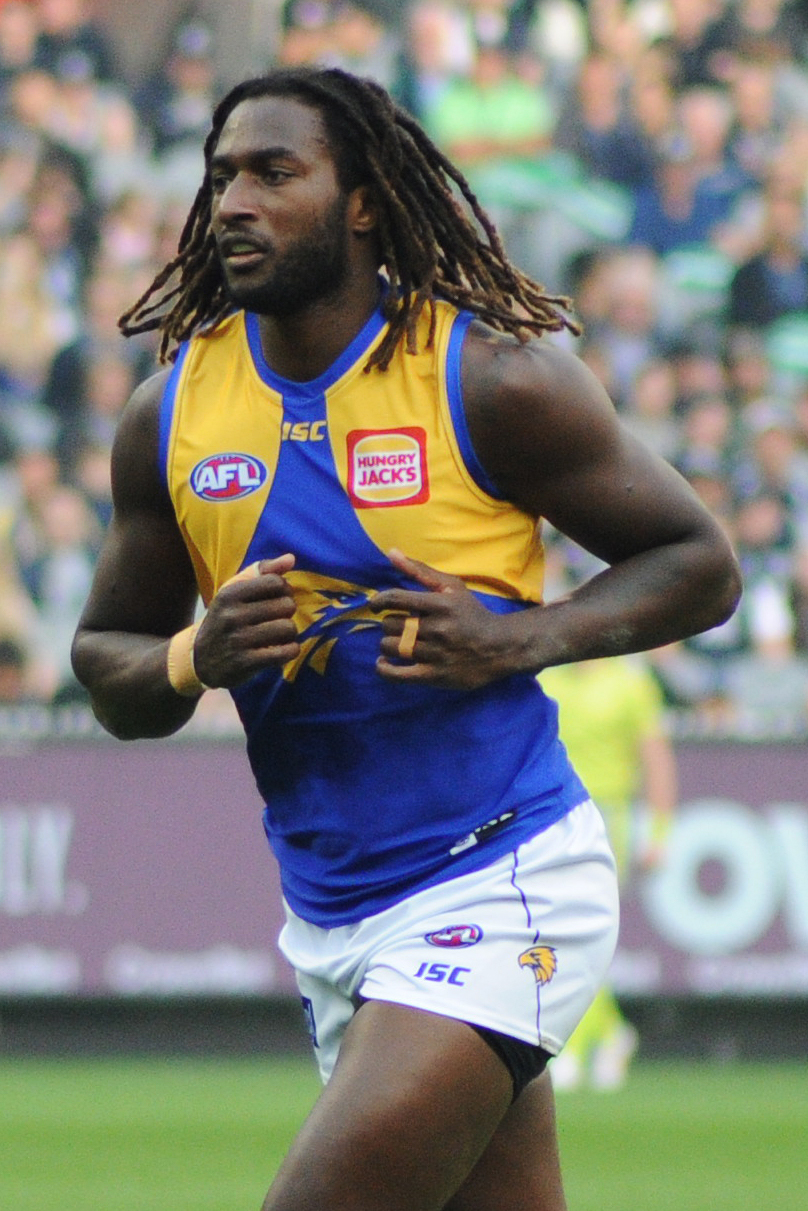
Nic Naitanui made a return from injury in round 15.

West Coast had a bye in round 13. The following round, they dominated Essendon, however they only won by 35 points due to their inaccuracy. West Coast had 24 more inside 50s and 20 more scoring shots, but kicked twice as many behinds as goals in the first half. The final score was 106–71, leaving West Coast disappointed after what could have been a significant boost to their percentage. Jarrod Cameron made his debut that match, and Jeremy McGovern was given a one match suspension for pushing Matt Guelfi into the boundary fence. In round 15, Nic Naitanui made a much-anticipated return from injury to the AFL, having played one match for the Eagles' WAFL team the previous week. West Coast's match against Hawthorn at the MCG in wet weather was a narrow 77–71 victory. Scores had been level before Jamie Cripps kicked the winning goal with less than two minutes to go.

Round 16 saw the Eagles win the 50th Western Derby 122–31; the 91-point margin was the second largest in a Western Derby, and Fremantle's 31 points their lowest score. The win meant that West Coast had a record-equalling nine game winning streak against Fremantle. Brad Sheppard won his first Glendinning–Allan Medal. The following round, West Coast lost to Collingwood by one point, despite leading for most of the match. West Coast were unable to score any goals for the last quarter and a half, allowing Collingwood to come back from an 18-point margin. Jarrod Cameron, playing his fourth AFL match, was one of the best on ground, kicking four goals. However, after that loss, West Coast were still in the top four. In round 18, West Coast played Melbourne at TIO Traeger Park in Alice Springs, their first time playing in the town. West Coast won the match 91–78, holding off a surge in goals by Melbourne. A late withdrawal by Shannon Hurn due to a calf injury enabled Francis Watson to make his debut.

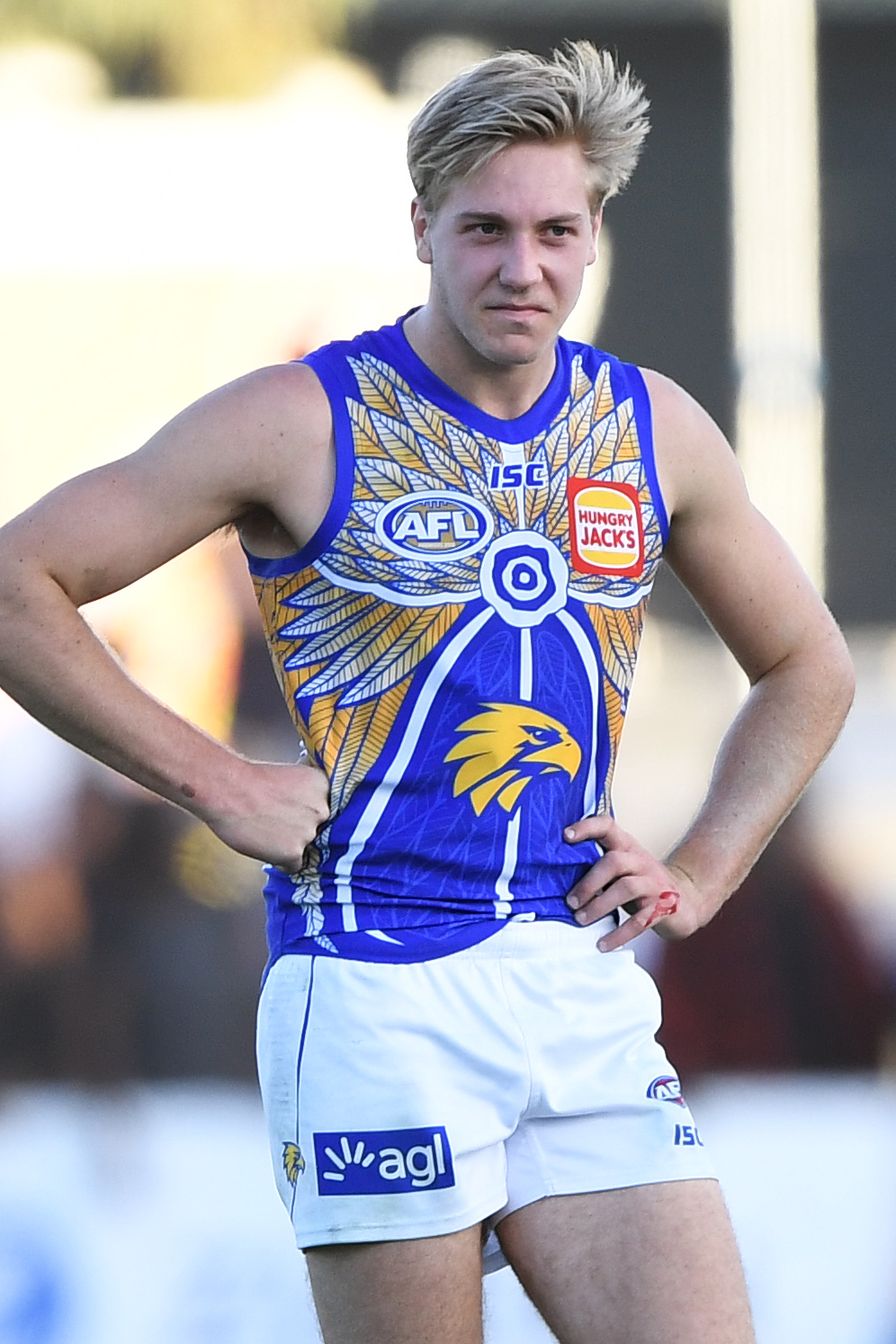
Oscar Allen received a Rising Star nomination in round 21.

In round 19, West Coast defeated North Melbourne 121–72, placing the Eagles two wins inside the top four. Josh Kennedy kicked seven goals, one of which was his 600th goal. Shannon Hurn returned from injury for the Eagles' round 20 match against Carlton at Marvel Stadium. West Coast had a solid win, beating Carlton 99–75. This put the Eagles on 14 wins, the same number as the first-placed Geelong. West Coast then won their following match, against Adelaide, 90–80. The close score caused the Eagles to drop from second to third on the ladder despite the win. West Coast were still looking at a top two finish though. Oscar Allen received a Rising Star award nomination for his three-goal effort against Adelaide.

In round 22, West Coast faced Richmond, 2018's minor premiers, in what AFL.com.au called the "game of the season", and a possible preview for the Grand Final. West Coast played well in the first quarter of the match, kicking seven goals to Richmond's three. Richmond made a gradual comeback after quarter time though, kicking six of the next eight goals to be behind one point at three-quarter time. It had started raining at half time, which favoured Richmond's playing style over the Eagles'. Richmond gained the lead early in the final quarter, kicking the first two goals. West Coast tried to gain the lead back, but were unable to do so. Richmond ended up winning by six points. It was now unlikely for the Eagles to finish in the top two, with the results of other teams required to go their way, but a top four finish was still possible. Going into their round 23 match against Hawthorn, almost all expectations were that West Coast would win, and finish the home-and-away season firmly in the top four. Hawthorn were barely in finals contention, and West Coast were playing at home. Instead, Hawthorn won the match by 38 points, putting West Coast in a precarious position on the ladder, having to rely on other teams' results to go their way for a top four finish. When Richmond beat the Brisbane Lions the following day, West Coast moved down to fifth on the ladder, missing out on the double chance in the finals that comes to teams that finish in the top four, making it significantly harder to win the premiership.

=== Finals ===
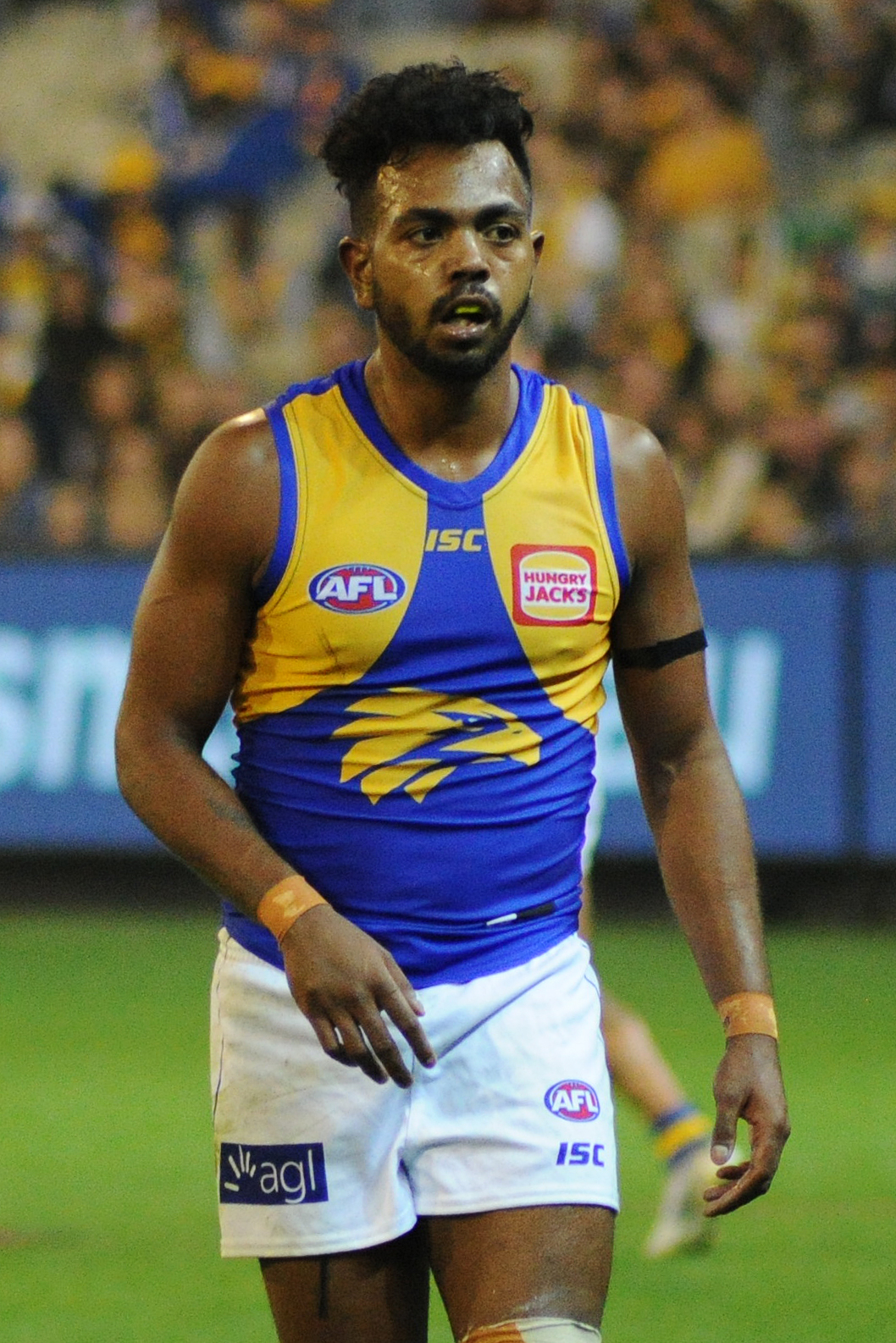
Willie Rioli was provisionally suspended before the semi-final.

West Coast had a 116–61 win in their elimination final against Essendon; Nic Naitanui was reported for shoving Essendon's Zach Merrett into the fence after Merrett pulled on Naitanui's hair. Both received a $1000 fine for the incident. The elimination final was Luke Shuey's 200th AFL game. On the day before their semi-final, Willie Rioli was provisionally suspended, effective immediately, as a result of an incident on 20 August, where he substituted his urine with another substance during a drug test. In the second week of the finals, West Coast faced Geelong in a semi-final at the MCG. The Cats had come out of a loss to Collingwood in a qualifying final the previous weekend. Geelong started the match well, kicking five goals in the first quarter, whereas West Coast only kicked one. West Coast narrowed the margin, kicking two more goals than Geelong in the second quarter. The Eagles managed to take back the lead in the third quarter, but they were unable to get a lead of more than seven points. The margin at three quarter time was four points in favour of the Eagles. West Coast kicked no goals in the final quarter, and Geelong kicked four, giving the Cats a 20-point win. This eliminated the West Coast Eagles from the finals series.

In a post-season review for AFL.com.au, Travis King rated West Coast's season a "B−", writing that "inconsistency plagued the reigning premiers", and that "the Eagles could – and should – have finished top-four". He also said "their inability to put poor teams away cost them valuable percentage", but praised the decision to trade for Tom Hickey.

=== Results ===
JLT Community Series results
Game	Day	Date	Result	Score			Opponent	Score			Ground	Attendance
Game	Day	Date	Result	G	B	T	Opponent	G	B	T	Ground	Attendance
1	Friday	1 March	Won	15	9	99	Geelong	8	17	65	Leederville Oval	6,028
2	Sunday	10 March	Won	16	13	109	Fremantle	8	10	58	Rushton Park	8,047

Regular season results
Round	Day	Date	Result	Score			Opponent	Score			Ground		Attendance	Ladder
Round	Day	Date	Result	G	B	T	Opponent	G	B	T	Ground		Attendance	Ladder
1	Saturday	23 March	Lost	8	10	58	Brisbane Lions	15	12	102	The Gabba	A	20,029	16th
2	Saturday	30 March	Won	16	8	104	Greater Western Sydney	7	10	52	Optus Stadium	H	54,985	10th
3	Saturday	6 April	Won	15	8	98	Collingwood	11	10	76	Melbourne Cricket Ground	A	60,878	6th
4	Saturday	13 April	Won	10	9	69	Fremantle	7	14	56	Optus Stadium	H	58,219	3rd
5	Friday	19 April	Lost	8	5	53	Port Adelaide	13	17	95	Optus Stadium	H	49,290	8th
6	Sunday	28 April	Lost	7	4	46	Geelong	15	14	104	GMHBA Stadium	A	28,085	12th
7	Saturday	4 May	Won	11	14	80	Gold Coast	8	9	57	Optus Stadium	H	47,497	10th
8	Saturday	11 May	Won	12	16	88	St Kilda	10	10	70	Marvel Stadium	A	24,246	7th
9	Friday	17 May	Won	13	7	85	Melbourne	9	15	69	Optus Stadium	H	51,162	6th
10	Saturday	25 May	Won	13	7	85	Adelaide	10	13	73	Adelaide Oval	A	41,630	5th
11	Sunday	2 June	Won	21	7	133	Western Bulldogs	10	12	72	Optus Stadium	H	53,195	4th
12	Sunday	9 June	Lost	10	11	71	Sydney	18	8	116	Sydney Cricket Ground	A	36,640	4th
13	Bye													5th
14	Thursday	20 June	Won	14	22	106	Essendon	11	5	71	Optus Stadium	H	52,810	4th
15	Saturday	29 June	Won	11	11	77	Hawthorn	9	17	71	Melbourne Cricket Ground	A	31,895	3rd
16	Saturday	6 July	Won	19	8	122	Fremantle	2	19	31	Optus Stadium	A	56,358	2nd
17	Friday	12 July	Lost	12	5	77	Collingwood	11	12	78	Optus Stadium	H	56,251	4th
18	Sunday	21 July	Won	14	7	91	Melbourne	11	12	78	TIO Traeger Park	A	7,164	3rd
19	Saturday	27 July	Won	18	13	121	North Melbourne	10	12	72	Optus Stadium	H	54,376	2nd
20	Sunday	4 August	Won	15	9	99	Carlton	11	9	75	Marvel Stadium	A	32,802	2nd
21	Sunday	11 August	Won	13	12	90	Adelaide	12	8	80	Optus Stadium	H	54,994	3rd
22	Sunday	18 August	Lost	13	4	82	Richmond	13	10	88	Melbourne Cricket Ground	A	57,415	3rd
23	Saturday	24 August	Lost	9	13	67	Hawthorn	16	9	105	Optus Stadium	H	55,859	5th
EF	Thursday	5 September	Won	17	14	116	Essendon	9	7	61	Optus Stadium	H	59,216	—N/a
SF	Friday	13 September	Lost	10	8	68	Geelong	13	10	88	Melbourne Cricket Ground	A	51,813	—N/a

Key
H	Home game
A	Away game
EF	Elimination final
SF	Semi-final

=== Ladder ===
Pos	Team	Pld	W	L	D	PF	PA	PP	Pts	Qualification
1	Geelong	22	16	6	0	1984	1462	135.7	64	Finals series
2	Brisbane Lions	22	16	6	0	2004	1694	118.3	64	Finals series
3	Richmond (P)	22	16	6	0	1892	1664	113.7	64	Finals series
4	Collingwood	22	15	7	0	1885	1601	117.7	60	Finals series
5	West Coast	22	15	7	0	1902	1691	112.5	60	Finals series
6	Greater Western Sydney	22	13	9	0	1926	1669	115.4	52	Finals series
7	Western Bulldogs	22	12	10	0	1941	1810	107.2	48	Finals series
8	Essendon	22	12	10	0	1702	1784	95.4	48	Finals series
9	Hawthorn	22	11	11	0	1742	1602	108.7	44	
10	Port Adelaide	22	11	11	0	1806	1714	105.4	44	
11	Adelaide	22	10	12	0	1776	1761	100.9	40	
12	North Melbourne	22	10	12	0	1824	1834	99.5	40	
13	Fremantle	22	9	13	0	1579	1718	91.9	36	
14	St Kilda	22	9	13	0	1645	1961	83.9	36	
15	Sydney	22	8	14	0	1706	1746	97.7	32	
16	Carlton	22	7	15	0	1609	1905	84.5	28	
17	Melbourne	22	5	17	0	1569	1995	78.6	20	
18	Gold Coast	22	3	19	0	1351	2232	60.5	12	

Source: AFL Tables
Rules for classification: 1) points; 2) percentage; 3) number of points for.
(P) Premiers

== WAFL team ==
West Coast's WAFL team was captained by Fraser McInnes in its inaugural season. West Coast had a 9–9 win–loss record, finishing fourth out of ten on the ladder, qualifying them for the 2019 WAFL finals. They won an elimination final against West Perth, before losing a semi-final against Claremont.

== Awards ==
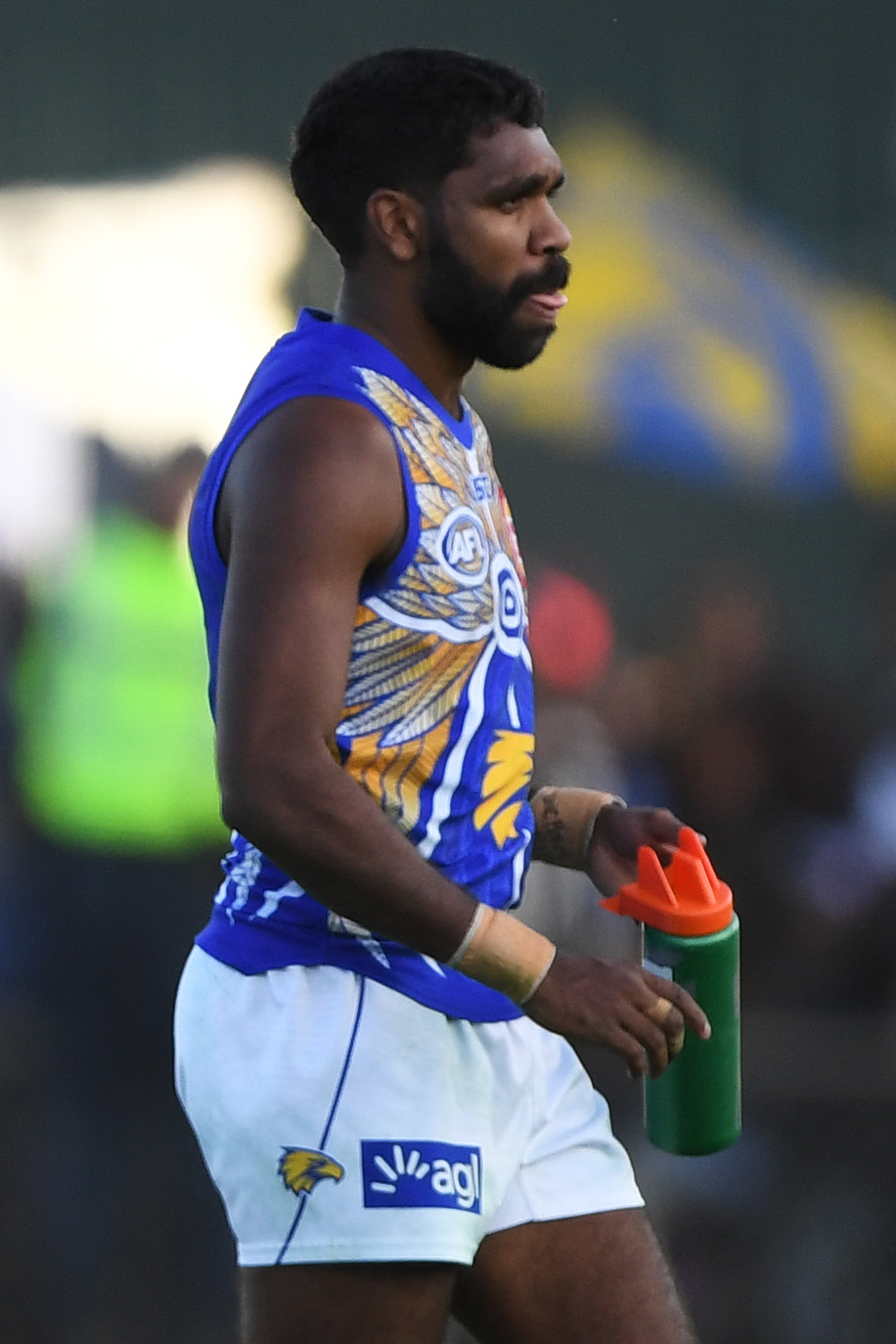
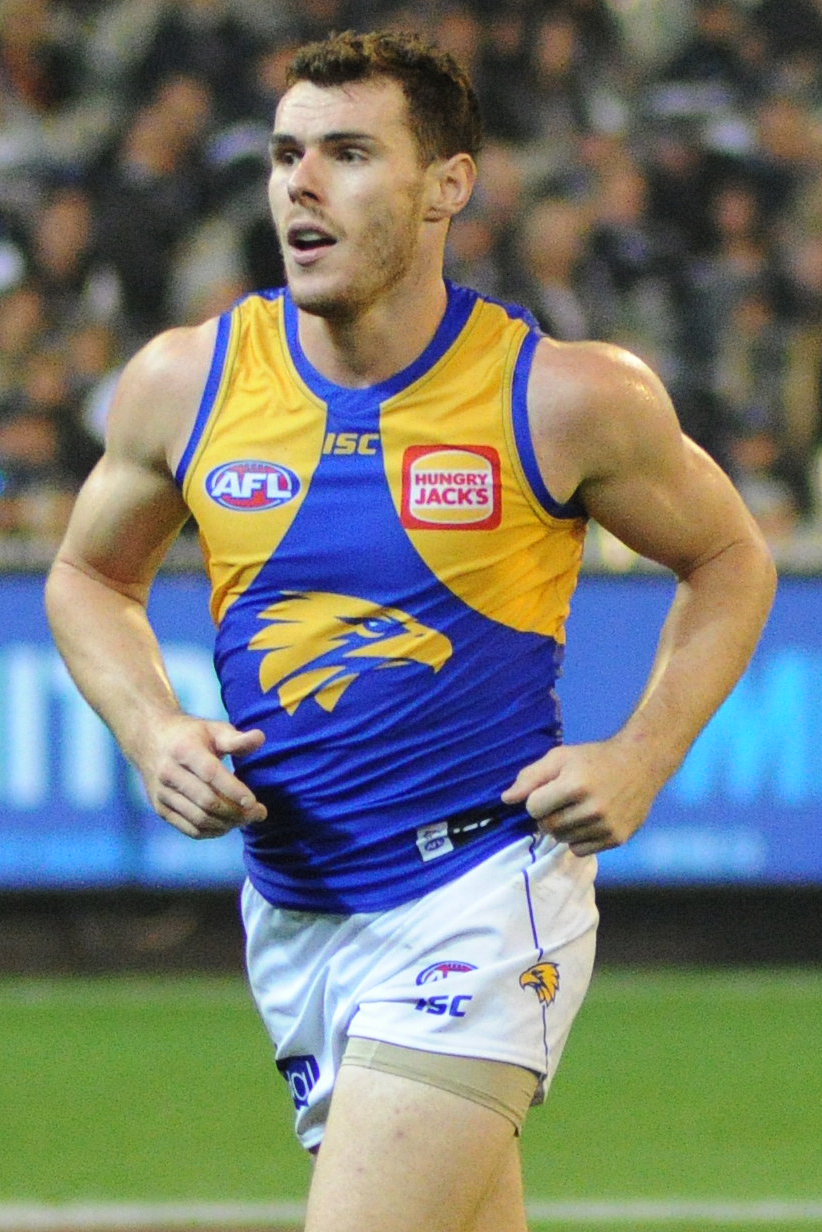
Liam Ryan won Mark of the Year and Luke Shuey won the John Worsfold Medal.

Liam Ryan won the Mark of the Year award for a mark he took during West Coast's round nine match against Melbourne. This was the third time an Eagles player won the award. Ryan's mark during round 20 against Carlton was another one of the three Mark of the Year finalists. Jack Petruccelle and Oscar Allen were nominated for the Rising Star award in rounds five and twenty-one respectively. Jack Darling, Shannon Hurn, Jeremy McGovern and Elliot Yeo were selected for the 2019 All-Australian team, with Hurn being the vice-captain of the team. 2019 was the first time for Darling, second time for Hurn and Yeo, and fourth time for McGovern to be selected in the All-Australian team. Andrew Gaff, Brad Sheppard and Luke Shuey were in the 40-man initial squad, but missed out on being selected in the 22-man final team. West Coast's four players in the All-Australian team was the equal highest number that year.

West Coast held its awards night on 3 October. Luke Shuey won the John Worsfold Medal for best and fairest player with 258 votes. Behind him were Elliot Yeo (239), Brad Sheppard (234), Andrew Gaff (231) and Jack Darling (199). This was Luke Shuey's second John Worsfold Medal, the first being in 2016. Other awards presented on the night were the Chris Mainwaring Medal for Best Clubman, awarded to Fraser McInnes; Emerging Talent, awarded to Oscar Allen; Player of the Finals, jointly awarded to Andrew Gaff and Luke Shuey; and Leading Goalkicker, awarded to Jack Darling, with 59 goals in the home-and-away season. West Coast's inaugural chairman Richard Colless, former players Chad Morrison and Mark Nicoski and former directors Robert Armstrong and Mark Hohnen were awarded life membership of the West Coast Eagles.

Awards received by West Coast players
Award	Awarded by	Player	Result	Ref.
All-Australian team	Australian Football League	Jack Darling	Selected	
All-Australian team	Australian Football League	Shannon Hurn	Selected	
All-Australian team	Australian Football League	Jeremy McGovern	Selected	
All-Australian team	Australian Football League	Elliot Yeo	Selected	
All-Australian team	Australian Football League	Andrew Gaff	Shortlisted	
All-Australian team	Australian Football League	Brad Sheppard	Shortlisted	
All-Australian team	Australian Football League	Luke Shuey	Shortlisted	
Mark of the Year	Australian Football League	Liam Ryan (round 9)	Won	
Mark of the Year	Australian Football League	Liam Ryan (round 20)	Finalist	
Goal of the Year	Australian Football League	Willie Rioli (round 19)	Finalist	
Rising Star	Australian Football League	Jack Petruccelle (round 5)	Nominated	
Rising Star	Australian Football League	Oscar Allen (round 21)	Nominated	
John Worsfold Medal	West Coast Eagles	Luke Shuey	Won	
Chris Mainwaring Medal for Best Clubman	West Coast Eagles	Fraser McInnes	Won	
Emerging Talent	West Coast Eagles	Oscar Allen	Won	
Player of the Finals	West Coast Eagles	Andrew Gaff	Won	
Player of the Finals	West Coast Eagles	Luke Shuey	Won	
Leading Goalkicker	West Coast Eagles	Jack Darling	Won	
