= Harry Cunningham (footballer) =

Australian rules footballer

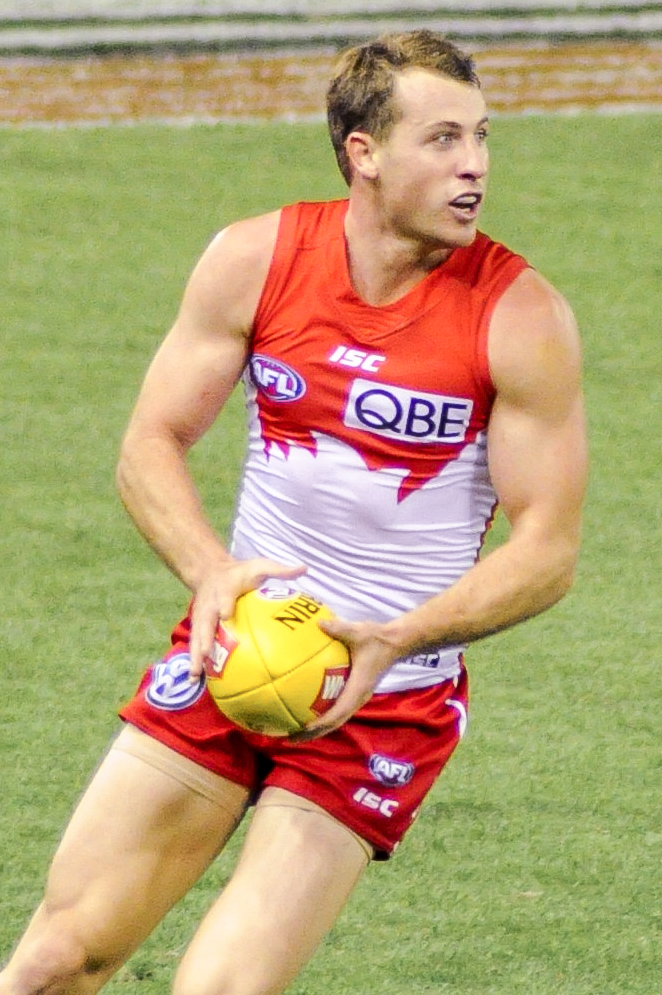
- Cunningham playing for Sydney in March 2017

Personal information
- Born: 6 December 1993 (age 32); Wagga Wagga, New South Wales
- Original team: Turvey Park (Riverina Football League)
- Draft: No. 93, 2012 rookie draft
- Height: 181 cm (5 ft 11 in)
- Weight: 71 kg (157 lb)
- Position: Midfielder

Playing career^{1}
Years	Club	Games (Goals)
2012–2026	Sydney	233 (54)
- ^{1} Playing statistics correct to the end of 2026.

Career highlights
- Rising Star nominee: 2014

Harry Cunningham (born 6 December 1993) is a professional Australian rules footballer who is set to play for the Adelaide Crows in the Australian Football League (AFL) from 2027. He previously played for the Sydney Swans between 2012 and 2026.

== Early life ==
Cunningham was born and raised in Wagga Wagga. His father Mark played for the North Broken Hill Football Club. Harry played his junior football with Turvey Park.

== AFL career ==
=== Sydney (2012–2026) ===
He was recruited by the club with the 93rd overall pick in the 2012 rookie draft, before being promoted to the senior list in 2012. Elevated from the rookie list prior to the 2012 season, Cunningham made his debut in the inaugural Sydney Derby, Round 1, against Greater Western Sydney. He was not selected in the 2012 Grand Final team which defeated Hawthorn to win the premiership.

In round 12, 2014 AFL season, Cunningham kicked a career-high four goals against the Gold Coast Suns. Three weeks later, Cunningham was awarded a nomination for the 2014 AFL Rising Star for his efforts against the GWS Giants. Cunningham's breakout season fell just short of a fairytale ending after the Swans lost to Hawthorn in the 2014 Grand Final.

Cunningham featured in the 2022 AFL Grand Final, in which the Swans lost to Geelong.

In the opening minutes of the round two, 2024 match between Sydney and Essendon, Cunningham was on the receiving end of a crude bump from Essendon forward Peter Wright, which saw him substituted out of the match. Wright received a four-match suspension from the AFL Tribunal as a result of the incident. Cunningham played his 200th game in July against the Brisbane Lions. Later that year, he played in his third Grand Final, this time losing to Brisbane.

Cunningham was concussed in the round 19, 2026 match against the Adelaide Crows after receiving rough contact from Darcy Fogarty. After being amongst Sydney's best in the qualifying final win against the Lions, Cunningham would go on to miss the preliminary final against Fremantle after a calf injury at training.

=== Adelaide (2027–present) ===
In a rare arrangement, Cunningham was delisted by the Swans in October of 2026 so that he could join the Adelaide Crows in the 2026 rookie draft.

== Statistics ==
Updated to the end of round 22, 2026.

Legend
G	Goals	K	Kicks	D	Disposals	T	Tackles
B	Behinds	H	Handballs	M	Marks

Season	Team	No.	Games	Totals							Averages (per game)							Votes
Season	Team	No.	Games	G	B	K	H	D	M	T	G	B	K	H	D	M	T	Votes
2012	Sydney	44	1	0	0	4	0	4	2	1	0.0	0.0	4.0	0.0	4.0	2.0	1.0	0
2013	Sydney	7	5	4	1	20	21	41	11	7	0.8	0.2	4.0	4.2	8.2	2.2	1.4	0
2014	Sydney	7	25	15	5	159	162	321	103	74	0.6	0.2	6.4	6.5	12.8	4.1	3.0	0
2015	Sydney	7	21	12	7	163	153	316	85	67	0.6	0.3	7.8	7.3	15.0	4.0	3.2	0
2016	Sydney	7	18	5	2	131	118	249	55	69	0.3	0.1	7.3	6.6	13.8	3.1	3.8	0
2017	Sydney	7	11	5	1	83	73	156	32	42	0.5	0.1	7.5	6.6	14.2	2.9	3.8	0
2018	Sydney	7	23	7	5	251	171	422	106	78	0.3	0.2	10.9	7.4	18.3	4.6	3.4	0
2019	Sydney	7	9	0	1	121	63	184	52	25	0.0	0.1	13.4	7.0	20.4	5.8	2.8	0
2020 (Note: The 2020 season was played with 17 home-and-away matches per team (down from 22) and 16-minute quarters with time on (down from 20-minute quarters with time on) due to the impact of the COVID-19 pandemic.)	Sydney	7	17	0	1	157	96	253	59	38	0.0	0.1	9.2	5.6	14.9	3.5	2.2	0
2021	Sydney	7	21	0	0	229	113	342	108	55	0.0	0.0	10.9	5.4	16.3	5.1	2.6	0
2022	Sydney	7	10	0	0	58	53	111	33	24	0.0	0.0	5.8	5.3	11.1	3.3	2.4	0
2023	Sydney	7	24	3	2	171	148	319	85	68	0.1	0.1	7.1	6.2	13.3	3.5	2.8	0
2024	Sydney	7	23	1	0	184	87	271	115	55	0.0	0.0	8.0	3.8	11.8	5.0	2.4	0
2025	Sydney	7	11	0	1	89	61	150	58	22	0.0	0.1	8.1	5.5	13.6	5.3	2.0	0
2026	Sydney	7	12	2	3	78	62	140	35	35	0.2	0.3	6.5	5.2	11.7	2.9	2.9	0
Career			231	54	29	1898	1381	3279	939	660	0.2	0.1	8.2	6.0	14.2	4.1	2.9	0

== Honours and achievements ==
Team

- 3x Minor Premiership: (Sydney): 2014, 2016, 2024
- 3× McClelland Trophy (Sydney): 2014, 2016, 2026

Individual

- AFL Rising Star nominee: 2014 (round 15)
