= Luke Foley (footballer) =

Australian football league player

Personal information
- Born: 8 October 1999 (age 27)
- Original teams: Subiaco, (WAFL)
- Draft: No. 31, 2018 AFL draft, West Coast
- Debut: 17 September 2020, West Coast vs. North Melbourne, at Carrara Stadium
- Height: 188 cm (6 ft 2 in)
- Weight: 75 kg (165 lb)
- Position: Defender

Playing career^{1}
Years	Club	Games (Goals)
2019–2023	West Coast	32 (2)
- ^{1} Playing statistics correct to the end of 2023.

Luke Foley (born 8 October 1999) is an Australian rules footballer who played for the West Coast Eagles in the Australian Football League (AFL). He was recruited by West Coast with the 31st draft pick in the 2018 AFL draft.

== Early football ==
A West Coast Eagles supporter growing up, Foley played for the Sorrento-Duncraig Hawks Junior Football Club for the majority of his junior career, participating in 2 grand finals and winning one premiership in 2014. He also played for Subiaco in the West Australian Football League, in the colts division. During his time with Subiaco he played 16 games and kicked 3 goals, and averaged 12 disposals a game. He also participated in Subiaco's 2 point premiership win over Swan Districts, just missing out on the Mel Whinnen Medal after being recognised as one of the best on ground. He also represented Western Australia in the AFL Under 18 Championships, playing 3 games, kicking 2 goals and averaging 17.3 disposals a game.

== AFL career ==
Foley debuted in West Coast's 15 point win over North Melbourne in the 18th round of the 2020 AFL season. On debut, Foley collected 3 disposals, 2 marks and a tackle. He was delisted at the end of the 2023 season.

== Statistics ==
Statistics are correct to the end of 2020

Legend
G	Goals	K	Kicks	D	Disposals	T	Tackles
B	Behinds	H	Handballs	M	Marks

Season	Team	No.	Games	Totals							Averages (per game)						
Season	Team	No.	Games	G	B	K	H	D	M	T	G	B	K	H	D	M	T
2019	West Coast	29	0	—	—	—	—	—	—	—	—	—	—	—	—	—	—
2020 (Note: The 2020 season was played with 17 home-and-away matches per team (down from 22) and 16-minute quarters with time on (down from 20-minute quarters with time on) due to the impact of the COVID-19 pandemic.)	West Coast	29	1	0	0	3	0	3	2	1	0.0	0.0	3.0	0.0	3.0	2.0	1.0
Career			1	0	0	3	0	3	2	1	0.0	0.0	3.0	0.0	3.0	2.0	1.0
