= Luke Dunstan =

Australian rules footballer

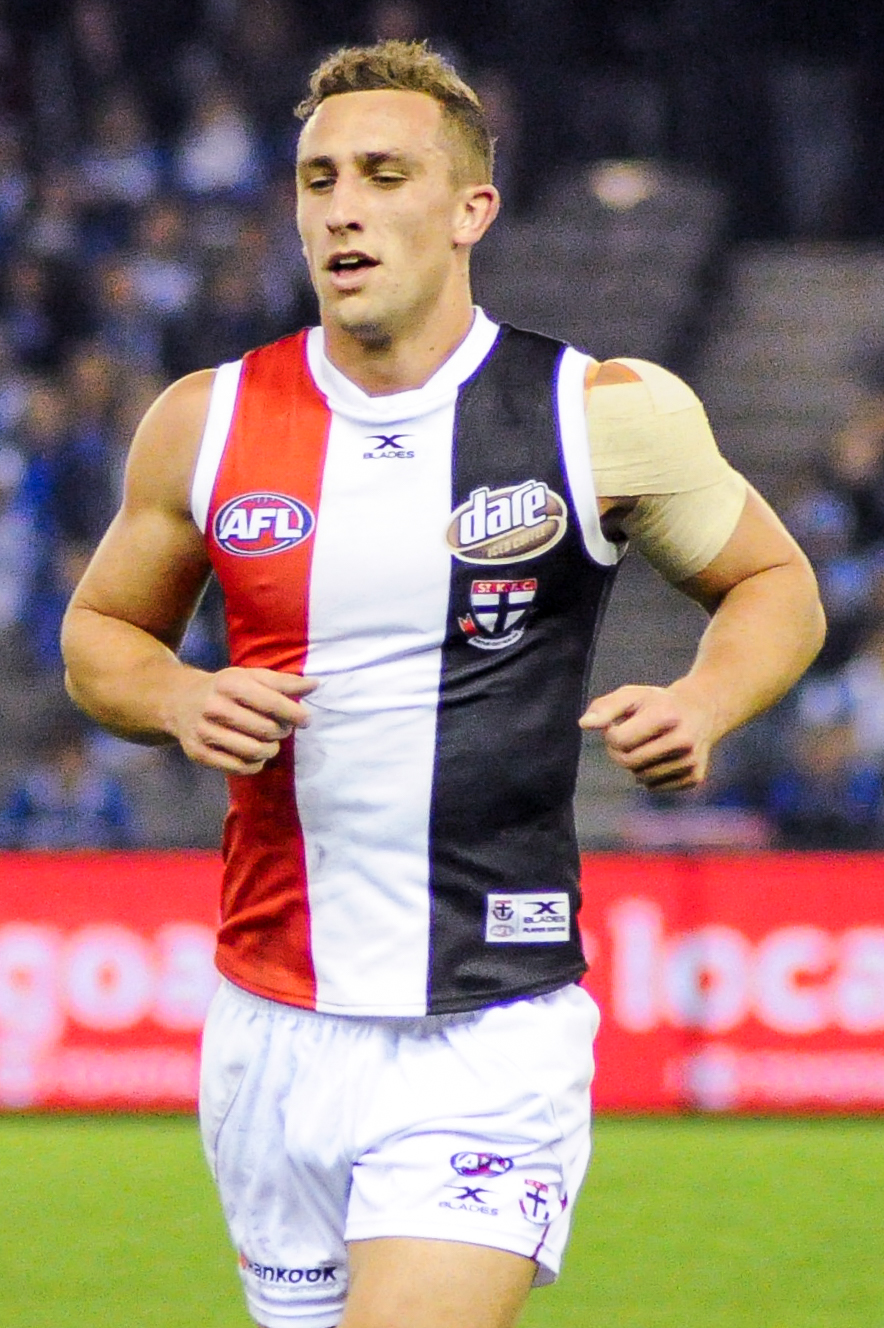
- Dunstan playing for St Kilda in June 2017

Personal information
- Full name: Luke Dunstan
- Born: 29 January 1995 (age 31); South Australia, Australia
- Original team: Woodville-West Torrens (SANFL)
- Draft: Pick 18, 2013 National Draft (St Kilda)
- Height: 185 cm (6 ft 1 in)
- Weight: 86 kg (190 lb)
- Position: Midfielder

Club information
- Current club: Melbourne
- Number: 27

Playing career^{1}
Years	Club	Games (Goals)
2014–2021	St Kilda	116 (46)
2022-2023	Melbourne	5 (0)
Total		121 (46)
- ^{1} Playing statistics correct to the end of round 13, 2023.

Career highlights
- Ian Stewart Medal: 2021; 2014 AFL Rising Star nominee; VFL premiership player: 2022

Luke Dunstan (born 29 January 1995) is a former Australian rules footballer who last played for the Melbourne Football Club in the Australian Football League (AFL), having previously played for the St Kilda Football Club. As an under-18, he played for the Woodville-West Torrens Football Club in the South Australian National Football League (SANFL).

== Career ==
Dunstan was drafted by St Kilda in the 2013 AFL draft from the Woodville-West Torrens Football Club in the South Australian National Football League (SANFL). Before he was playing for the Woodville-West Torrens Football Club, Dunstan played for South Clare Sports Club in the North Eastern Football League in the Mid North.

In Round 1, 2014, he played his first game for St Kilda against Melbourne. He was awarded the AFL Rising Star nomination for his performance.

Dunstan became an integral part of St Kilda's midfield over the course of 2014 before bowing out after round 19 for shoulder surgery. Following his last game in round 23, St Kilda icon and Dunstan's mentor Lenny Hayes handed his number 7 guernsey over to Dunstan. Soon afterwards, Dunstan signed a contract extension, keeping him at the Saints until 2017.

Dunstan turned his back on a potential move home to South Australia after playing an important role in the Saints' climb to ninth in 2016. The 22-year-old averaged 17 disposals from 18 games in 2016, before being forced to undergo his second shoulder reconstruction in three years – but this time to his opposite (left) shoulder.

In 2017, Dunstan signed a two-year contract extension with St Kilda to remain at the club until the end of 2019.

At the conclusion of the 2021 AFL season, Dunstan moved to Melbourne as an unrestricted free agent. The move was documented in the Stan series Show Me The Money.

== Statistics ==
Updated to the end of round 13, 2023.

Legend
G	Goals	K	Kicks	D	Disposals	T	Tackles
B	Behinds	H	Handballs	M	Marks

Season	Team	No.	Games	Totals							Averages (per game)							Votes
Season	Team	No.	Games	G	B	K	H	D	M	T	G	B	K	H	D	M	T	Votes
2014	St Kilda	36	16	9	6	143	157	300	59	60	0.6	0.4	8.9	9.8	18.8	3.7	3.8	2
2015	St Kilda	7	19	12	8	168	156	324	62	70	0.6	0.4	8.8	8.2	17.1	3.3	3.7	0
2016	St Kilda	7	18	5	11	131	182	313	44	86	0.3	0.6	7.3	10.1	17.4	2.4	4.8	0
2017	St Kilda	7	16	10	9	166	180	346	67	79	0.6	0.6	10.4	11.3	21.6	4.2	4.9	1
2018	St Kilda	7	16	5	5	178	169	347	56	70	0.3	0.3	11.1	10.6	21.7	3.5	4.4	0
2019	St Kilda	7	18	4	12	208	194	402	59	87	0.2	0.7	11.6	10.8	22.3	3.3	4.8	2
2020 (Note: The 2020 season was played with 17 home-and-away matches per team (down from 22) and 16-minute quarters with time on (down from 20-minute quarters with time on) due to the impact of the COVID-19 pandemic.)	St Kilda	7	1	0	0	13	8	21	3	9	0.0	0.0	13.0	8.0	21.0	3.0	9.0	1
2021	St Kilda	7	12	1	4	169	134	303	51	59	0.1	0.3	14.1	11.2	25.3	4.3	4.9	11
2022 (Note: 2022 statistics include one game in which Dunstan was a used medical substitute (round 11) and one game in which he was an unused medical substitute (round 18).)	Melbourne	27	5	0	1	22	41	63	10	11	0.0	0.2	4.4	8.2	12.6	2.0	2.2	0
2023	Melbourne	27	0	–	–	–	–	–	–	–	–	–	–	–	–	–	–	
Career			121	46	56	1198	1221	2419	411	531	0.4	0.5	9.9	10.1	20.0	3.4	4.4	17
