= Kade Kolodjashnij =

Australian rules footballer

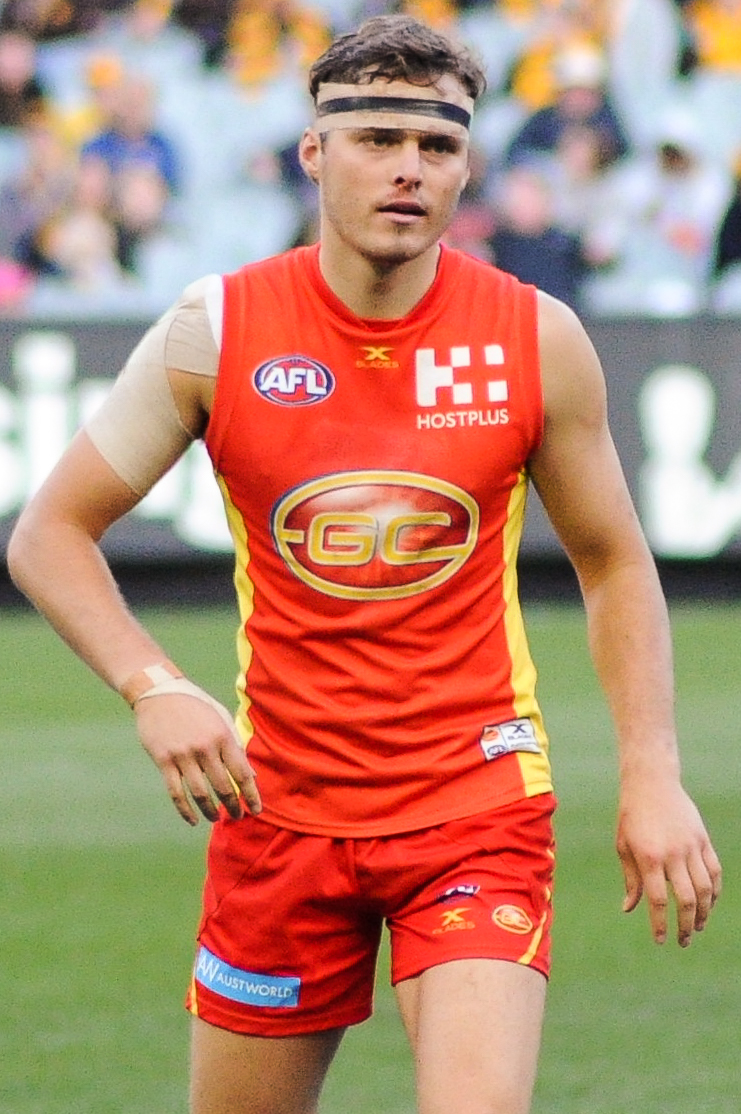
- Kolodjashnij playing for Gold Coast in June 2017

Personal information
- Full name: Kade Kolodjashnij
- Born: 9 August 1995 (age 31); Launceston, Tasmania
- Original team: Launceston (TSL)
- Draft: No. 5, 2013 AFL draft, Gold Coast
- Height: 190 cm (6 ft 3 in)
- Weight: 85 kg (187 lb)
- Position: Defender

Playing career^{1}
Years	Club	Games (Goals)
2014–2018	Gold Coast	78 (13)
2019–2020	Melbourne	2 (1)
Total		80 (14)
- ^{1} Playing statistics correct to the end of 2019.

Career highlights
- AFL Rising Star nominee 2014; 2× 22under22 team: 2014, 2015; Harrison Medal: 2013

Kade Kolodjashnij (/kɒləˈdʒæzniː/, "collar-JAZZ-knee"; born 9 August 1995) is a former Australian rules footballer who played for the Gold Coast Suns and Melbourne Football Club in the Australian Football League (AFL).

== Early life ==
Kolodjashnij grew up in Tasmania where he played soccer and basketball in his younger years. His grandparents fled the Soviet controlled Ukraine after World War II and settled in Australia. Kolodjashnij's twin brother Jake also plays football professionally for the Geelong Cats.

He attended St Patrick's College, Launceston.

== Junior football ==
Kolodjashnij began playing Australian football for the first time at 12 years of age for the Prospect Junior Football Club. Kolodjashnij lived across the road from Prospect Park a multi-user venue for both soccer and Australian football. He and brother Jake played in junior premierships for Prospect in U13s and U14s of the Northern Tasmanian Junior Football Association. In his U15 season with Prospect he and Jake were referred to Tasmanian Head Coach, and ex-AFL player, Mathew Armstrong, for consideration for the Tasmanian Talented Player Pathway and were duly recognised as having significant potential. As part of the talented player pathway process, both the Kolodjashnij brothers were permitted to Tasmanian State League Club, Launceston, for their U16 year. Kade played for Tasmania in the Under 16 National Championship in 2011 and followed that with selection in the U18 National Championships in both 2012 and 2013 and was considered a top 5 prospect leading into the 2013 AFL draft. He was taken with the 5th pick in the 2013 draft by the Gold Coast Football Club.

== AFL career ==
Kolodjashnij made his AFL debut against Fremantle in Round 2 of the 2014 season. From his first games it was apparent that Kolodjashnij was coping well with the pace and requirements of AFL football. In Round 10 of his debut season he secured a nomination for the AFL/NAB Rising Star for 2014.

At the conclusion of the 2018 season, Kolodjashnij was traded to Melbourne.

After the 2020 season, Kolodjashnij retired from football due to concussion issues.

== Personal life ==
Kolodjashnij currently studies a Bachelor of Commerce at Deakin University.

== Statistics ==
Statistics are correct to the end of the 2019 season

Legend
G	Goals	K	Kicks	D	Disposals	T	Tackles
B	Behinds	H	Handballs	M	Marks

Season	Team	No.	Games	Totals							Averages (per game)						
Season	Team	No.	Games	G	B	K	H	D	M	T	G	B	K	H	D	M	T
2014	Gold Coast	28	18	5	3	192	116	308	88	34	0.3	0.2	10.7	6.4	17.1	4.9	1.9
2015	Gold Coast	28	22	5	1	320	170	490	124	42	0.2	0.0	14.5	7.7	22.3	5.6	1.9
2016	Gold Coast	28	19	0	1	210	123	333	114	45	0.0	0.1	11.1	6.5	17.5	6.0	2.4
2017	Gold Coast	10	11	3	0	138	94	232	83	24	0.3	0.0	12.5	8.5	21.1	7.5	2.2
2018	Gold Coast	10	8	0	2	97	33	130	44	15	0.0	0.3	12.1	4.1	16.3	5.5	1.9
2019	Melbourne	16	2	1	0	10	7	17	7	6	0.5	0.0	5.0	3.5	8.5	3.5	3.0
Career			80	14	7	967	543	1510	460	166	0.2	0.1	12.1	6.8	18.9	5.8	2.1
