= 2014 AFL Rising Star =

Australian rules football award

2014 NAB AFL Rising Star
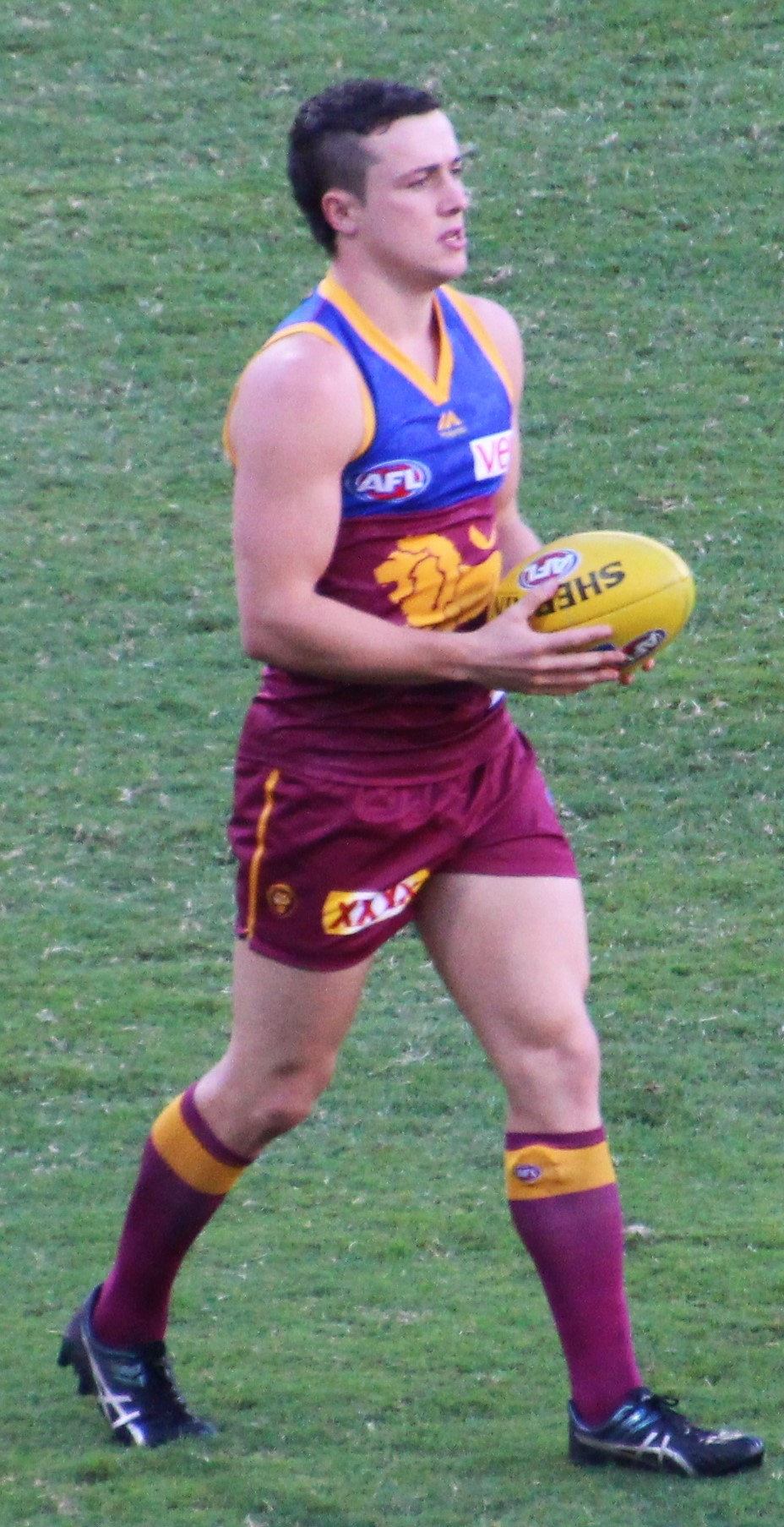
- Lewis Taylor, winner of the 2014 AFL Rising Star, during the 2017 AFL season
- Sponsored by: National Australia Bank
- Date: 3 September
- Country: Australia
- Ron Evans medallist: Lewis Taylor (Brisbane Lions)

The NAB AFL Rising Star award is given annually to a stand out young player in the Australian Football League. The 2014 winner was Lewis Taylor. Taylor polled one more vote than Marcus Bontempelli, making it the closest ever count.

== Eligibility ==
Every round, an Australian Football League rising star nomination is given to a stand out young player. To be eligible for nomination, a player must be under 21 on 1 January of that year and have played 10 or fewer senior games before the start of the season; a player who is suspended may be nominated, but is not eligible to win the award. At the end of the year, one of the 23 nominees is the winner of award.

== Nominations ==
Round	Player	Club	Ref.
1	Luke Dunstan	St Kilda	
2	Dylan Buckley	Carlton	
3	Josh Kelly	Greater Western Sydney	
4	Luke McDonald	North Melbourne	
5	Matt Crouch	Adelaide	
6	James Aish	Brisbane Lions	
7	Tom Langdon	Collingwood	
8	Jarman Impey	Port Adelaide	
9	Lewis Taylor	Brisbane Lions	
10	Kade Kolodjashnij	Gold Coast	
11	Zach Merrett	Essendon	
12	Joe Daniher	Essendon	
13	Marcus Bontempelli	Western Bulldogs	
14	Jack Billings	St Kilda	
15	Harry Cunningham	Sydney	
16	Troy Menzel	Carlton	
17	Nathan Hrovat	Western Bulldogs	
18	Jonathon Patton	Greater Western Sydney	
19	Darcy Gardiner	Brisbane Lions	
20	Jake Stringer	Western Bulldogs	
21	Jake Lloyd	Sydney	
22	Matt Taberner	Fremantle	
23	Jack Martin	Gold Coast	

== Final voting ==
	Player	Club	Votes
1	Lewis Taylor	Brisbane Lions	39
2	Marcus Bontempelli	Western Bulldogs	38
3	Luke McDonald	North Melbourne	32
4	James Aish	Brisbane Lions	19
5	Kade Kolodjashnij	Gold Coast	7
6	Luke Dunstan	St Kilda	5
6	Tom Langdon	Collingwood	5
8	Harry Cunningham	Sydney	3
9	Jarman Impey	Port Adelaide	1
9	Josh Kelly	Greater Western Sydney	1
Source: AFL Record Season Guide 2015
