= Bailey Williams (footballer, born 2000) =

Australian football league player

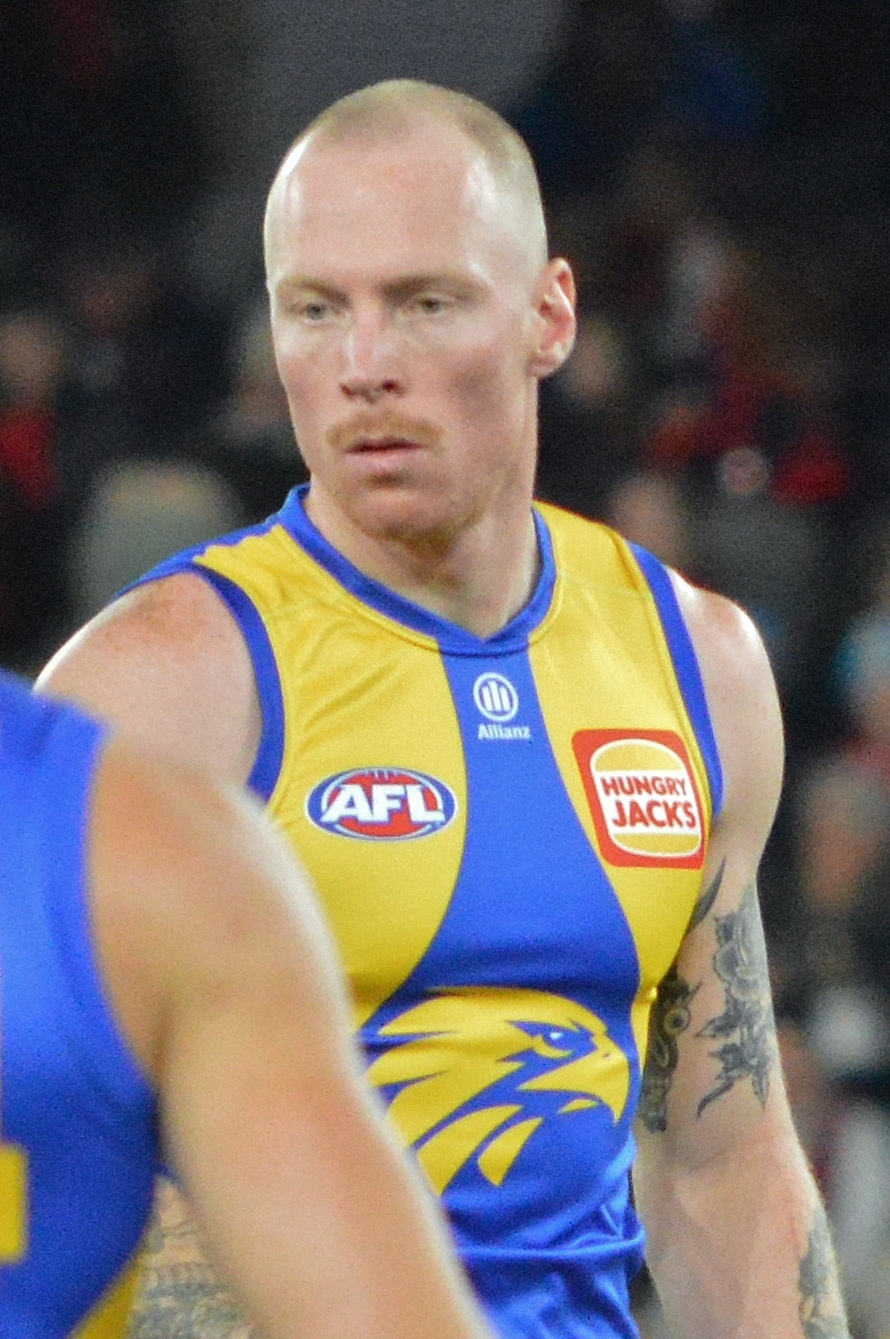
- Williams in May 2026

Personal information
- Full name: Bailey J. Williams
- Born: 17 April 2000 (age 26)
- Original team: Dandenong Stingrays (NAB League)
- Draft: No. 35, 2018 AFL draft, West Coast
- Debut: 27 August 2020, West Coast vs. Richmond, at Carrara Stadium
- Height: 201 cm (6 ft 7 in)
- Weight: 101 kg (223 lb)
- Position: Ruck/Forward

Club information
- Current club: West Coast
- Number: 32

Playing career^{1}
Years	Club	Games (Goals)
2019–	West Coast	105 (38)
- ^{1} Playing statistics correct to the end of round 22, 2026.

Bailey J. Williams (born 17 April 2000) is an Australian rules footballer who plays for the West Coast Football Club in the Australian Football League (AFL). He was recruited by the West Coast Football Club with the 35th draft pick in the 2018 AFL draft.

== Early football ==
Williams played for the Frankston Pines Football Club. He also played football for his school, Western Port Secondary College. Williams spent the 2017 and 2018 seasons with the Dandenong Stingrays in the NAB League. During his two seasons with the Stingrays, Williams kicked 40 goals while playing in a total of 31 games. Williams also represented Vic Country in the 2017 and 2018 seasons, playing a total of 7 games and kicking 6 goals.

== AFL career ==
Williams was likely to make his debut for the team in Round 1 against Melbourne, but was injured before the game and was not able to debut. Williams debuted for West Coast in their 27 point loss to Richmond in the 14th round of the 2020 AFL season. On debut, Williams kicked 1 behind, and collected 8 disposals, 2 marks and 2 tackles.

== Statistics ==
Updated to the end of round 22, 2026.

Legend
G	Goals	K	Kicks	D	Disposals	T	Tackles
B	Behinds	H	Handballs	M	Marks	H/O	Hit-outs

Season	Team	No.	Games	Totals								Averages (per game)								Votes
Season	Team	No.	Games	G	B	K	H	D	M	T	H/O	G	B	K	H	D	M	T	H/O	Votes
2019	West Coast	32	0	—	—	—	—	—	—	—	—	—	—	—	—	—	—	—	—	0
2020 (Note: The 2020 season was played with 17 home-and-away matches per team (down from 22) and 16-minute quarters with time on (down from 20-minute quarters with time on) due to the impact of the COVID-19 pandemic.)	West Coast	32	3	1	1	10	11	21	5	5	24	0.3	0.3	3.3	3.7	7.0	1.7	1.7	8.0	0
2021	West Coast	32	6	3	3	23	12	35	15	8	50	0.5	0.5	3.8	2.0	5.8	2.5	1.3	8.3	0
2022	West Coast	32	17	6	6	83	74	157	31	35	280	0.4	0.4	4.9	4.4	9.2	1.8	2.1	16.5	0
2023	West Coast	32	23	5	3	130	165	295	44	79	634	0.2	0.1	5.7	7.2	12.8	1.9	3.4	27.6	1
2024	West Coast	32	23	4	6	140	116	256	43	60	482	0.2	0.3	6.1	5.0	11.1	1.9	2.6	21.0	0
2025	West Coast	32	16	11	4	78	65	143	28	29	235	0.7	0.3	4.9	4.1	8.9	1.8	1.8	14.7	0
2026	West Coast	32	17	8	7	128	99	227	38	53	495	0.5	0.4	7.5	5.8	13.4	2.2	3.1	29.1	0
Career			105	38	30	592	542	1134	204	269	2200	0.4	0.3	5.6	5.2	10.8	1.9	2.6	21.0	1
