= Tom Langdon =

Australian rules footballer

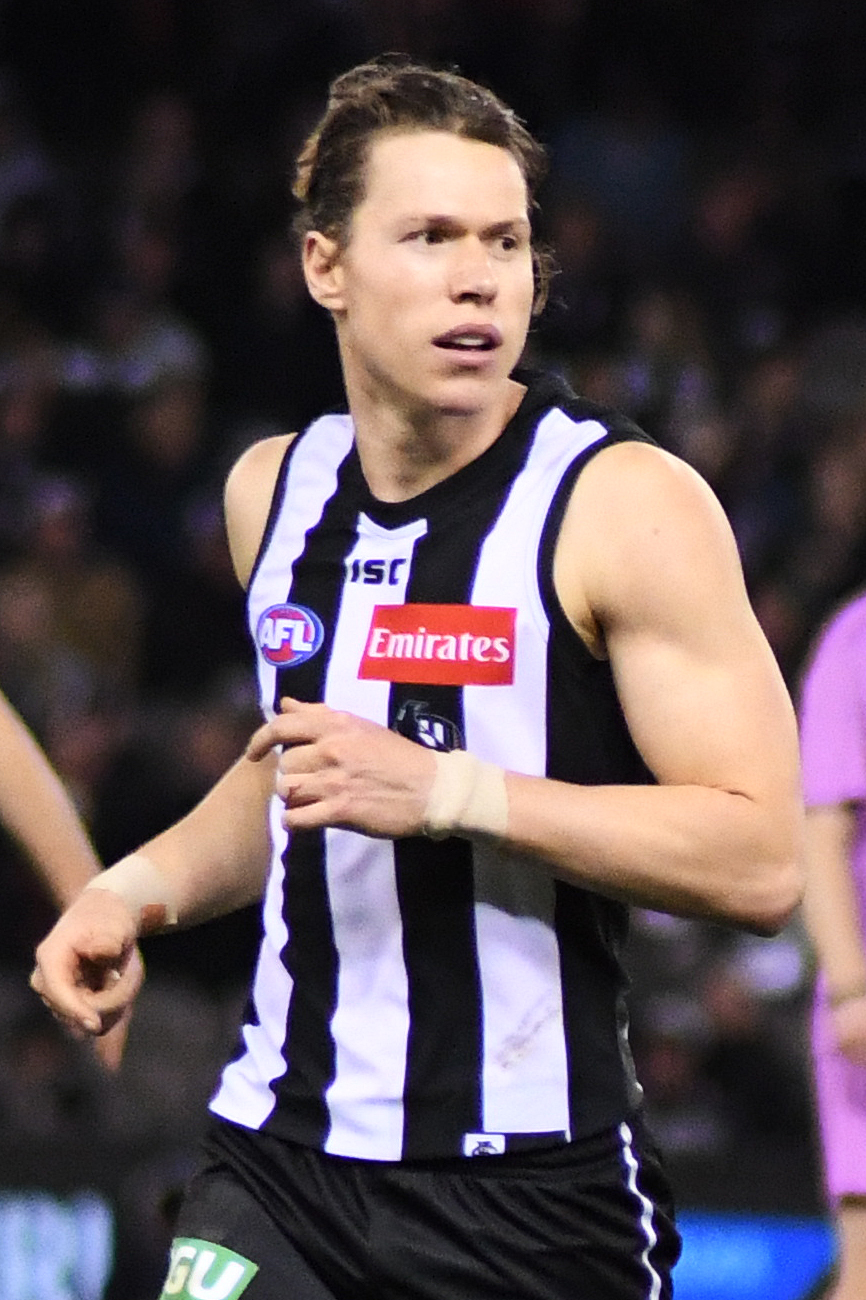
- Langdon playing for Collingwood in August 2018

Personal information
- Full name: Thomas Langdon
- Nickname: Langers
- Born: 9 June 1994 (age 32)
- Original team: Sandringham Dragons (TAC Cup)
- Draft: No. 65, 2013 national draft
- Height: 190 cm (6 ft 3 in)
- Weight: 86 kg (190 lb)
- Position: Defender

Playing career
Years	Club	Games (Goals)
2014–2020	Collingwood	89 (3)

Career highlights
- 2× 22under22 team: 2014, 2015; 2014 AFL Rising Star: nominee

Thomas Langdon (born 9 June 1994) is a former professional Australian rules footballer who played for the Collingwood Football Club in the Australian Football League (AFL).

== State football ==
Langdon played junior football with Prahran and with Glen Iris Gladiators, in the Yarra Junior Football League. He nominated for the 2012 AFL draft, but wasn't selected. The following season, he was named co-captain of the Sandringham Dragons. In 2013, Langdon played six games in the Victorian Football League (VFL) with Sandringham and was named twice in the best.

== AFL career ==
He was recruited by the Collingwood Football Club with the 65th overall selection in the 2013 AFL draft. He featured in all three senior pre-season games, averaging 15 disposals and 2.3 rebound 50s a game, followed by making his debut in the opening round of the 2014 season, against Fremantle at Etihad Stadium, where he was named as one of the best players despite the 70 point loss, tallying 24 disposals. In the seventh round, Langdon was selected as an AFL Rising Star nominee, following a best on ground performance in Collingwood's 34 point over old rivals Carlton when he collected 23 disposals. After the season, Langdon won the Harry Collier Trophy as Collingwood's Best First Year Player. He was also selected for the 22 Under 22 team, a feat he repeated in 2015. At the end of the 2018 season, both Sydney and Fremantle showed interest in Langdon, hoping to sign him, but in the end he signed a three-year contract extension with Collingwood. In the ninth round of the 2019 season, Langdon injured his knee halfway through Collingwood's 41 point win over St Kilda, Nine weeks later, after trying to rehabilitate, he underwent knee surgery, ruling him out for the rest of the season. A timeframe for his return wasn't determined by the pre-season of the 2020 season, and Langdon considered retirement. After not playing any games during the 2020 season Langdon announced his retirement at the end of November.

== Playing style ==
Langdon could play as a defender or as a midfielder. He had a significant advantage when the ball was in the air due to his balance, game sense, and being able to read the ball in flight. He also had the ability to mark strongly overhead and was a fluent kick.

== Personal life ==
Langdon's younger brother, Ed Langdon, plays for Melbourne. Before being drafted to Collingwood, Langdon barracked for Richmond. In 2013, Langdon started studying business arts at Monash University. He is currently studying a Bachelor of Commerce at Deakin University.

== Statistics ==
Statistics are correct to the end of the 2020 season

Legend
G	Goals	K	Kicks	D	Disposals	T	Tackles
B	Behinds	H	Handballs	M	Marks

Season	Team	No.	Games	Totals							Averages (per game)						
Season	Team	No.	Games	G	B	K	H	D	M	T	G	B	K	H	D	M	T
2014	Collingwood	41	19	0	2	192	123	315	107	47	0	0.1	10.1	6.5	16.6	5.6	2.5
2015	Collingwood	8	22	0	5	248	213	461	110	70	0	0.2	11.3	9.7	21.0	5.0	3.2
2016	Collingwood	8	5	2	1	49	47	96	16	13	0.4	0.2	9.8	9.4	19.2	3.2	2.6
2017	Collingwood	8	11	0	1	99	111	210	62	28	0	0.1	9.0	10.1	19.1	5.6	2.5
2018	Collingwood	8	23	1	1	229	229	458	130	58	0.04	0.04	10.0	10.0	19.9	5.7	2.5
2019	Collingwood	8	9	0	1	70	91	161	45	18	0	0.1	7.8	10.1	17.9	5.0	2.0
2020	Collingwood	8	0	—	—	—	—	—	—	—	—	—	—	—	—	—	—
Career			89	3	11	887	814	1701	470	234	0.03	0.1	10.0	9.2	19.1	5.3	2.6
