= Jeremy McGovern =

Former Australian rules footballer (born 1992)

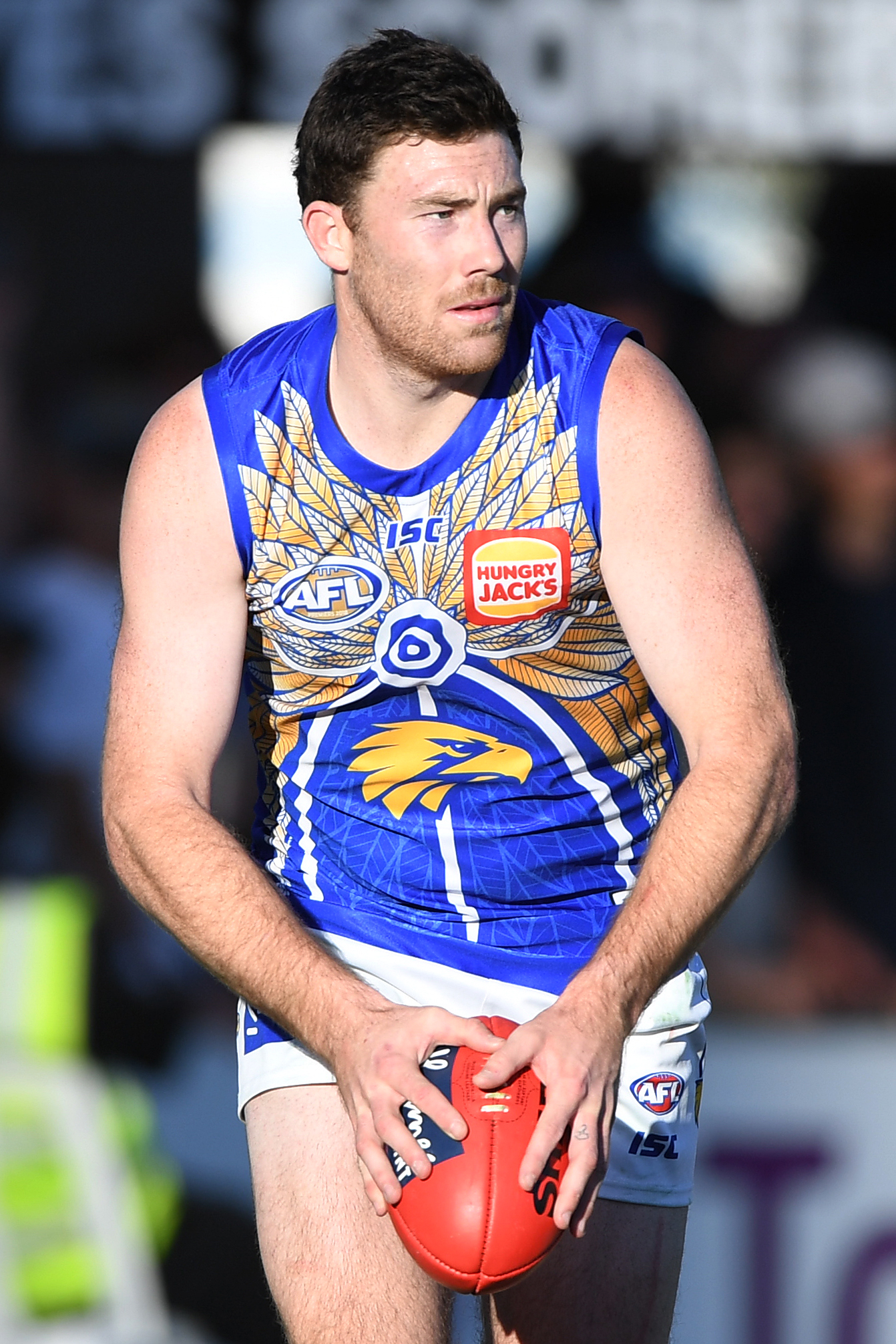
- McGovern playing for West Coast in July 2019

Personal information
- Full name: Jeremy Ronald McGovern
- Born: 15 April 1992 (age 34); Sydney, New South Wales
- Original team: Claremont Football Club
- Draft: No. 44, 2011 rookie draft, West Coast
- Height: 197 cm (6 ft 6 in)
- Weight: 99 kg (218 lb)
- Position: Key defender

Playing career
Years	Club	Games (Goals)
2011–2025	West Coast	197 (38)

Career highlights
- AFL premiership player: 2018; 5× All-Australian team: 2016, 2017, 2018, 2019, 2024; Claremont premiership player: 2012; John Worsfold Medal: 2024

Jeremy Ronald McGovern (born 15 April 1992) is a former Australian rules footballer who played for the West Coast Eagles in the Australian Football League (AFL). He was a tall key-position player who spent most of his career as a defender, although he occasionally played forward.

McGovern was recruited from the Claremont Football Club with the 44th pick in the 2011 Rookie Draft. He was something of a late bloomer, only making his senior debut for West Coast midway through the 2014 season (aged 22). McGovern was a fixture in the Eagles' line-up since then, and in 2015 played in the grand final loss to Hawthorn, and in 2018 played in the grand final win over Collingwood. He was named as a defender in the 2016, 2017, 2018, 2019, and 2024 All-Australian teams, entrenching himself as one of the best key defenders in the league's history.

== Early life ==
McGovern was born in Sydney, New South Wales while father Andrew McGovern was playing for Sydney in the early 90s. The family moved over to West Australia in 1993 after Andrew was delisted and eventually played for Fremantle. His younger brother Mitch plays for Carlton.

As a child, McGovern spent four years living in Warburton, a remote community in the Gibson Desert where his father was working for the Clontarf Foundation. He later spent time in Kalgoorlie and Albany, attending North Albany Senior High School. McGovern played his junior football for the North Albany Football Club, in the same teams as two other future AFL players – Josh Bootsma and Marley Williams. He played WAFL colts for Claremont in 2010, as a ruckman.

== AFL career ==
McGovern was drafted by the Eagles with the 44th pick in the 2011 Rookie Draft (held in late 2010). He was elevated to the senior list in November 2013. In late 2013, McGovern showed up for pre-season training significantly overweight, after a holiday to Thailand. He was "banished" from the club and told to pursue an individual training routine if he wished to continue his career, eventually losing 10 kg and regaining the trust of the coaching staff.

In his fourth year on West Coast's playing list, McGovern finally made his senior debut for the club in round six of the 2014 season, against Carlton at Etihad Stadium. He was dropped for the next game, but returned in round twelve against Hawthorn as a like-for-like replacement for Josh Kennedy (who had a fractured cheekbone). McGovern kicked 10 goals across the next four games, and held his spot for the rest of the year. Overall he managed 13 games in 2014, playing predominantly as a swingman in a similar vein to how Adam Hunter was used under John Worsfold.

In 2015, McGovern emerged as one of the best contested marks in the game as a result of West Coast's considerable injury list. Injuries to Eric MacKenzie and Mitch Brown meant McGovern was forced back into a key defender role. He performed it with aplomb despite often being undersized and inexperienced compared to some of the best forwards in the game. He emerged as a reliable mark, often going back with the flight of the ball into packs to influence the contest, and he was rewarded with a position in the 40-man All-Australian squad (although he did not make the final team).

In 2016, after a career-best season, McGovern was named as a defender in the 2016 All-Australian team. He was the first Eagles key defender to make the team since Darren Glass in 2011. McGovern set a new overall record for the most contested intercept marks in a season, and recorded the equal-most marks from opposition kicks in 2016 (alongside Easton Wood).

In July 2018, McGovern signed a five-year contract extension with West Coast reportedly worth $5 million. Many clubs were interested in recruiting him, including Fremantle, St Kilda and Sydney. In the West Coast game against Port Adelaide on Saturday 11 August 2018, McGovern kicked a goal after the siren to win the game for the West Coast Eagles.

In Round 23, 2018, McGovern broke the record for most intercept marks in a season by taking his 77th of 2018. The record was previously held by Easton Wood of the Western Bulldogs at 76 and was set in 2015.

2024 would be a successful season for McGovern as he achieved his fifth All Australian selection, his first in five years, and his first ever John Worsfold Medal as the West Coast Eagles Best & Fairest for season 2024.

After sustaining a concussion in West Coast's Round 8, 2025 game against Melbourne, McGovern consulted an AFL Concussion Panel. The panel recommended his retirement, which he and the Eagles announced on 20 June 2025.

== See also ==
- List of AFL debuts in 2014
- List of West Coast Eagles players

== Statistics ==
Legend
G	Goals	K	Kicks	D	Disposals	T	Tackles
B	Behinds	H	Handballs	M	Marks
#	Played in that season's premiership team

Season	Team	No.	Games	Totals							Averages (per game)							Votes
Season	Team	No.	Games	G	B	K	H	D	M	T	G	B	K	H	D	M	T	Votes
2014	West Coast	42	13	13	6	114	46	160	84	18	1.0	0.5	8.8	3.5	12.3	6.5	1.4	0
2015	West Coast	20	20	3	2	159	110	269	109	24	0.2	0.1	8.0	5.5	13.5	5.5	1.2	2
2016	West Coast	20	22	3	5	239	100	339	137	32	0.1	0.2	10.9	4.5	15.4	6.2	1.5	2
2017	West Coast	20	24	10	14	266	135	401	192	43	0.4	0.6	11.1	5.6	16.7	8.0	1.8	3
2018^{#}	West Coast	20	24	6	2	259	97	356	169	31	0.3	0.1	10.8	4.0	14.8	7.0	1.3	6
2019	West Coast	20	23	1	1	242	101	343	164	36	0.0	0.0	10.5	4.4	14.9	7.1	1.6	0
2020 (Note: The 2020 season was played with 17 home-and-away matches per team (down from 22) and 16-minute quarters with time on (down from 20-minute quarters with time on) due to the impact of the COVID-19 pandemic.)	West Coast	20	12	0	0	114	43	157	72	14	0.0	0.0	9.5	3.6	13.1	6.0	1.2	2
2021	West Coast	20	15	0	0	196	50	246	111	15	0.0	0.0	13.1	3.3	16.4	7.4	1.0	0
2022	West Coast	20	10	1	0	111	53	164	67	12	0.1	0.0	11.1	5.3	16.4	6.7	1.2	2
2023	West Coast	20	9	0	0	110	42	152	64	9	0.0	0.0	12.2	4.7	16.9	7.1	1.0	0
2024	West Coast	20	19	1	2	290	102	392	114	27	0.1	0.1	15.3	5.4	20.6	6.0	1.4	0
2025	West Coast	20	6	0	0	73	34	107	30	6	0.0	0.0	12.2	5.7	17.8	5.0	1.0	0
Career			197	38	32	2173	913	3086	1313	267	0.2	0.2	11.0	4.6	15.7	6.7	1.4	17
