= Andrew McGovern =

Australian rules footballer

Personal information
- Full name: Andrew Grant McGovern
- Born: 7 April 1968 (age 58)
- Original team: Claremont (WAFL)
- Debut: Round 2, 1992, Sydney Swans vs. West Coast Eagles, at SCG

Playing career^{1}
| Years | Club | Games (Goals) |
| 1992–1993 | Sydney | 20 (7) |
| 1995–1998 | Fremantle | 63 (2) |
| Total | | 83 (9) |
- ^{1} Playing statistics correct to the end of 1998.

Career highlights
- WA state captain: 1994

Andrew Grant McGovern (born 7 April 1968) is a former Australian rules footballer who played for the Sydney Swans and Fremantle in the Australian Football League.

He was originally drafted by the Swans from Claremont in the West Australian Football League with selection 4 in the 1991 AFL draft but only played two seasons with Sydney for 20 games.

At the end of the 1993 season he was delisted and returned to Western Australia and played for Claremont in 1994. During this season he captained the Western Australian state side in their victorious interstate game against South Australia. The following season he followed Claremont coach Gerard Neesham to the newly formed Fremantle Football Club and played 17 games, mainly as a defender. He would play a total of 63 games for Fremantle in four seasons before retiring at the end of 1999 after playing with Claremont in Westar Rules the whole season.

Since retiring from professional football McGovern has been involved with the Clontarf Football Academy.

Both of his sons, Jeremy and Mitch, have been on AFL lists, with the elder, Jeremy, formerly listed at West Coast Eagles and younger, Mitch, at Carlton.
