= Josh Smith (footballer, born 1994) =

Australian rules footballer (born 1994)

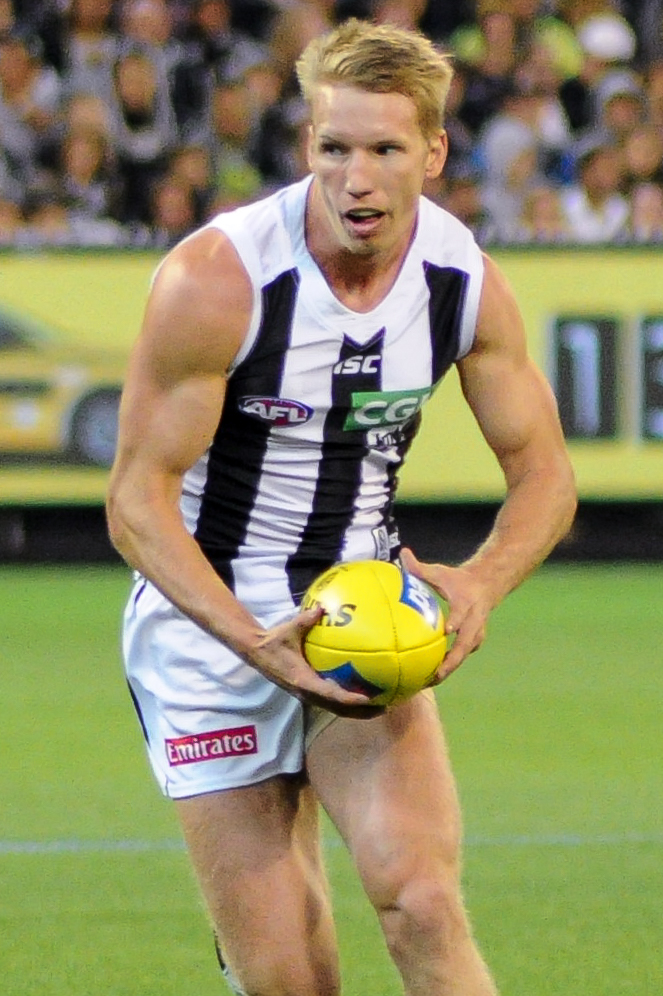
- Smith playing for Collingwood in March 2017

Personal information
- Full name: Josh Smith
- Born: 2 January 1994 (age 32)
- Original team: Redland (NEAFL)
- Draft: 25th pick, 2016 Rookie Draft
- Height: 181 cm (5 ft 11 in)
- Weight: 78 kg (172 lb)
- Position: Midfielder

Playing career^{1}
Years	Club	Games (Goals)
2016–2018	Collingwood	32 (6)
2019	West Coast	2 (1)
Total		34 (7)
- ^{1} Playing statistics correct to the end of 2019.

Career highlights
- Harry Collier Trophy: 2016

Josh Smith (born 2 January 1994) is an Australian rules footballer who played for the Collingwood Football Club and the West Coast Eagles in the Australian Football League (AFL).

Smith was first eligible to be drafted in 2012.

Originally from Brisbane and working in childcare, Smith was drafted by Collingwood with their 2nd pick of the 2016 rookie draft.

== AFL career ==
=== Collingwood (2016–2018) ===
Smith made his debut for Collingwood on 25 April 2016 for the annual Anzac Day clash against Essendon and scored his first goal in the match. Collingwood won the match by 69 points. Following his debut, he didn't miss a single match for the rest of the season, playing 18 games. At the end of the season, he managed to place 7th in the best & fairest and was awarded the Harry Collier Trophy as the best first-year player.

At the conclusion of the 2018 season, in which he played only one game, Smith was delisted by Collingwood.

=== West Coast (2019) ===
In the 2018 Draft period, Josh Smith was handed a lifeline being drafted as a rookie by the West Coast Eagles. Smith made his debut for the Eagles in their Round 2 52-point win against GWS. He kicked one goal and one behind and had 13 disposals. He then got dropped after that game and didn’t play until Round 17. In Round 17, he played in their 45-point loss to Sydney. He had 13 disposals.

== Statistics ==
Statistics are correct to the end of the 2019 season

Legend
G	Goals	K	Kicks	D	Disposals	T	Tackles
B	Behinds	H	Handballs	M	Marks

Season	Team	No.	Games	Totals							Averages (per game)						
Season	Team	No.	Games	G	B	K	H	D	M	T	G	B	K	H	D	M	T
2016	Collingwood	40	18	4	2	198	176	374	85	43	0.2	0.1	11.0	9.8	20.8	4.7	2.4
2017	Collingwood	40	13	2	0	185	70	255	86	30	0.2	0.0	14.2	5.4	19.6	6.6	2.3
2018	Collingwood	40	1	0	1	7	7	14	3	3	0.0	1.0	7.0	7.0	14.0	3.0	3.0
2019	West Coast	45	2	1	1	13	10	23	9	0	0.5	0.5	6.5	5.0	11.5	4.5	0.0
Career			34	7	4	403	263	666	183	76	0.2	0.1	12.2	7.9	20.1	5.4	2.4
