= 2021 West Coast Eagles season =

Australian rules football team based in Perth, Western Australia

West Coast Eagles
2021 season
- Coach: Adam Simpson (8th season)
- Captains: Luke Shuey (2nd season)
- Home ground: Optus Stadium
- AFL season: 9th
- Best and Fairest: Nic Naitanui
- Leading goalkicker: Jack Darling (42)
- Highest home attendance: 50,834 vs. Richmond (Round 13)
- Lowest home attendance: 0 vs. Fremantle (Round 7) and Western Bulldogs (Round 15)
- Club membership: 106,422

The West Coast Eagles are an Australian rules football team based in Perth, Western Australia. Their 2021 season was their 35th season in the Australian Football League (AFL), their eighth season under premiership coach Adam Simpson, and their second season with Luke Shuey as captain. Having finished in the top eight every season since 2015, it was expected that West Coast would do the same in 2021. They won eight of their first thirteen matches, including an unexpected win against Port Adelaide, and a 97-point thrashing by Geelong, placing them seventh on the ladder before their midseason bye. They continued on to lose seven of their remaining nine matches, including a 92-point loss to Sydney, and their first Western Derby loss since 2015, causing them to finish ninth, missing finals.

The COVID-19 pandemic continued to have an impact on the season, with crowd restrictions at some matches and some changes to the fixture during the season. Jack Darling, who kicked 42 goals, was the club's leading goal-scorer for the fourth time in his career. Nic Naitanui was the only Eagle to be in the All-Australian squad. Nic Naitanui was West Coast's best and fairest player, winning the John Worsfold Medal. 2021 was the second year for West Coast in the AFL Women's competition, in which they finished twelfth. It was also the second year in which West Coast fielded a team in the Western Australian Football League, after having withdrawn in 2020.

== Background ==
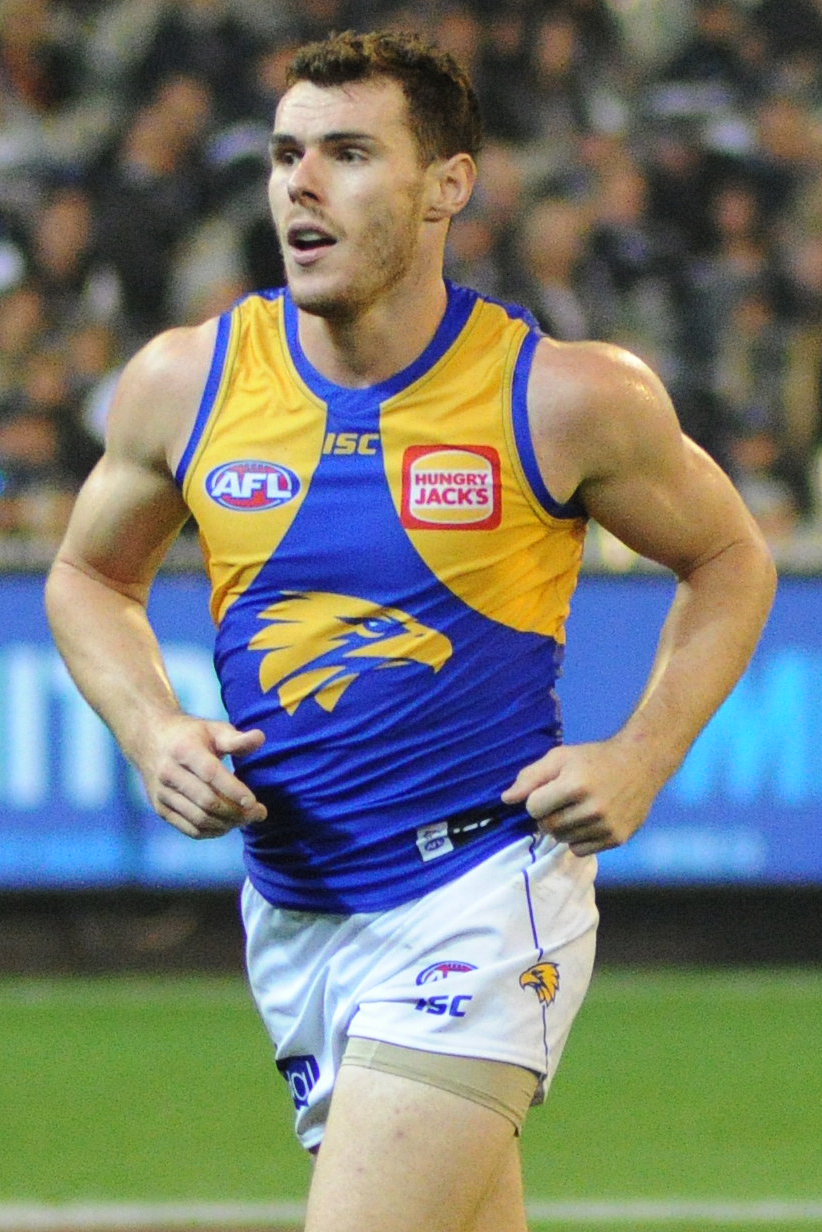
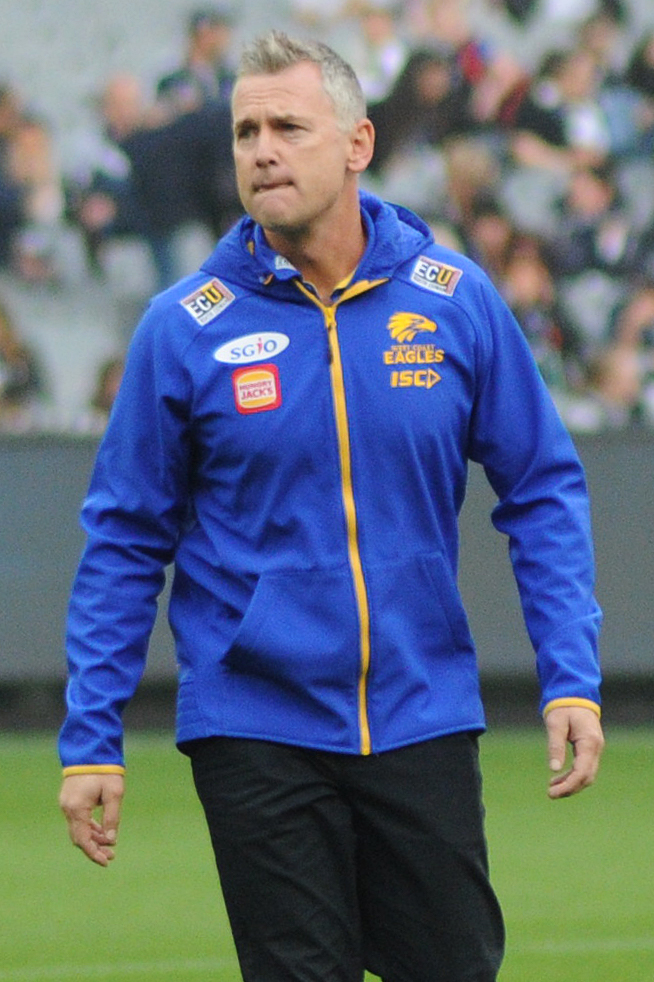
Luke Shuey (captain) and Adam Simpson (coach)

The West Coast Eagles are an Australian rules football team based in Perth, Western Australia, that competes in the Australian Football League (AFL). They ended the 2020 home-and-away season fifth on the ladder. Their season ended after Collingwood beat them in the first week of the finals.

In the off season, Luke Shuey was named captain of the West Coast Eagles for the second year in a row. Jeremy McGovern was named the sole vice-captain, having been in the role alongside Josh Kennedy in 2020. Kennedy and Nic Naitanui rounded out 2021's reduced leadership group as deputy vice-captains. Adam Simpson was head coach for an eighth season. There was a shake-up in assistant coaching roles following several assistant coaches leaving. The assistant coaches were Luke Webster (forwards), Adrian Hickmott (midfield) and Jaymie Graham (backs). The head of development was Gavin Bell, and the other development coaches were Mark Nicoski, Kyal Horsley and Daniel Pratt. Pratt was also the AFL Women's coach and WAFL coach.

West Coast continued with fast food outlet Hungry Jack's and online mortgage broker Lendi as their major sponsors for 2021. Their new clothing manufacturer was British sportswear company Castore, who signed a three-year contract with West Coast. The club had 106,422 members in 2021, narrowly beating Richmond to have the most out of any AFL club for the second year in a row.

== Playing list ==
=== Changes ===
At the end of their 2020 season, West Coast delisted Hamish Brayshaw, Nic Reid, Francis Watson, Anthony Treacy and Mitch O'Neill. Lewis Jetta was delisted after the trade period after having only played 6 AFL matches in 2020. Daniel Venables was delisted after spending the previous season and a half unable to play due to concussion, however he would later be selected by West Coast in the rookie draft.

West Coast's first trade of the 2020 trade period was with Greater Western Sydney, who gave Zac Langdon to the Eagles in exchange for pick 54. In their second trade, Tom Hickey was traded to Sydney after he requested to do so in order to be closer to his Queensland family and be selected for more games. Hickey only played 3 matches for West Coast in 2020, due to Nic Naitanui's good form and injury free season. As part of that trade, West Coast gave picks 34 and 60 to Sydney, and received picks 58, 62, a future second-round pick tied to Port Adelaide, and a future third-round pick. West Coast's final trade was with Brisbane Lions for Alex Witherden. The Eagles gave Brisbane pick 58 and a future third-round pick, and received pick 86.

In the 2020 AFL draft, Luke Edwards (pick 52), from South Australia, and Isiah Winder (pick 57), from Western Australia were drafted. Harry Edwards was elevated from the rookie list, signing on until 2022, and Mark Hutchings was moved from the senior list to the rookie list. Zane Trew (pick 12) and Daniel Venables (pick 27) were drafted in the 2021 rookie draft.

Prior to the 2021 mid-season draft, West Coast put Daniel Venables and Jarrod Cameron on the inactive list, allowing them to select two players in the mid-season draft. Venables was put on the inactive list due to still being unable to play due to a concussion he suffered in round nine of 2019, and Cameron because of a season-ending ankle injury he received in the Eagles' WAFL team. At the mid-season draft, West Coast selected Will Collins (pick 11) and Connor West (pick 23).

Removals from playing list
Player	Reason	Games played	Ref.
Hamish Brayshaw	Delisted	1	
Nic Reid	Delisted	3	
Francis Watson	Delisted	2	
Anthony Treacy	Delisted	0	
Mitch O'Neill	Delisted	0	
Tom Hickey	Traded to Sydney	102 (23 at West Coast)	
Lewis Jetta	Delisted	202 (75 at West Coast)	
Daniel Venables	Delisted	21 (21 at West Coast)	

Additions to playing list
Player	Acquired	Former club	Former league	Ref.
Zac Langdon	Traded from Greater Western Sydney	Greater Western Sydney	AFL	
Alex Witherden	Traded from Brisbane Lions	Brisbane Lions	AFL	
Luke Edwards	No. 52, 2020 national draft	Glenelg	SANFL	
Isiah Winder	No. 57, 2020 national draft	Peel Thunder	WAFL	
Harry Edwards	Rookie elevation	West Coast	AFL	
Zane Trew	No. 12, 2021 rookie draft	Swan Districts	WAFL	
Daniel Venables	No. 27, 2021 rookie draft	West Coast	AFL	
Will Collins	No. 11, 2021 mid-season draft	Swan Districts	WAFL	
Connor West	No. 23, 2021 mid-season draft	West Perth	WAFL	

=== Statistics ===
Playing list and statistics
Player	No.	Games	Goals	Behinds	Kicks	Handballs	Disposals	Marks	Tackles	Notes/Milestone(s)
Liam Ryan	1	14	24	10	116	28	144	55	21	
Jake Waterman	2	14	13	8	129	44	173	89	27	
Andrew Gaff	3	21	3	1	343	234	577	140	35	
Dom Sheed	4	22	9	6	320	259	579	108	51	
Brad Sheppard	5	20	0	0	220	127	347	129	32	200th AFL game (round 4)
Elliot Yeo	6	12	3	7	150	114	264	27	63	
Zac Langdon	7	17	6	7	81	101	182	55	35	West Coast debut (round 1)
Jack Redden	8	18	3	1	208	235	443	104	71	
Nic Naitanui	9	22	3	7	154	181	335	34	65	200th AFL game (round 18)
Jarrod Brander	10	11	5	6	108	60	168	53	11	
Tim Kelly	11	19	6	8	245	209	454	62	64	
Oscar Allen	12	21	28	16	154	58	212	99	39	
Luke Shuey	13	7	0	1	104	57	161	23	30	
Liam Duggan	14	14	0	0	188	77	265	94	30	
Jamie Cripps	15	22	26	26	205	109	314	82	86	
Luke Edwards	16	8	0	1	57	43	100	26	10	
Josh Kennedy	17	18	41	21	131	47	178	89	21	250th West Coast game (round 15)
Daniel Venables	18	0	—N/a	—N/a	—N/a	—N/a	—N/a	—N/a	—N/a	Rookie, Long-term injury (concussion)
Nathan Vardy	19	9	5	0	18	20	38	13	11	
Jeremy McGovern	20	15	0	0	196	50	246	111	15	
Jack Petruccelle	21	17	16	8	108	69	177	59	27	
Isiah Winder	22	1	1	0	2	3	5	1	1	AFL debut (round 4)
Alex Witherden	23	9	1	0	166	34	200	59	18	West Coast debut (round 5)
Xavier O'Neill	24	8	1	1	47	37	84	16	15	
Shannon Hurn	25	15	0	0	260	67	327	103	24	
Zane Trew	26	0	—N/a	—N/a	—N/a	—N/a	—N/a	—N/a	—N/a	Rookie
Jack Darling	27	22	42	19	176	91	267	123	53	
Tom Cole	28	22	0	0	203	98	301	105	44	
Luke Foley	29	6	1	0	53	21	74	23	7	
Jackson Nelson	30	19	0	1	176	57	233	76	26	
Jamaine Jones	31	15	11	3	64	37	101	21	47	Rookie
Bailey Williams	32	6	3	3	23	12	35	15	8	
Brayden Ainsworth	33	2	0	0	0	4	4	1	0	
Mark Hutchings	34	4	0	0	23	15	38	9	8	Rookie
Josh Rotham	35	19	0	1	232	73	305	161	18	
Connor West	36	5	1	4	35	28	63	16	13	Rookie, AFL debut (round 18)
Tom Barrass	37	16	0	0	168	53	221	117	10	
Ben Johnson	38	0	—N/a	—N/a	—N/a	—N/a	—N/a	—N/a	—N/a	
Jarrod Cameron	39	0	—N/a	—N/a	—N/a	—N/a	—N/a	—N/a	—N/a	
Callum Jamieson	40	0	—N/a	—N/a	—N/a	—N/a	—N/a	—N/a	—N/a	
Brendon Ah Chee	41	6	5	2	29	39	68	12	14	Rookie
Harry Edwards	42	10	0	0	75	28	103	53	20	
Will Collins	43	0	—N/a	—N/a	—N/a	—N/a	—N/a	—N/a	—N/a	Rookie
Willie Rioli	44	0	—N/a	—N/a	—N/a	—N/a	—N/a	—N/a	—N/a	Suspended until 20 August

== Season summary ==
The fixture for the 2021 season was revealed in December 2020, with each team scheduled to play 22 matches and have a mid-season bye, as was normal prior to the COVID-19 pandemic. Only the first six rounds had times and dates set for the matches, with the remaining dates released as the season progressed. West Coast are scheduled to play Adelaide, Collingwood, Fremantle, St Kilda and Western Bulldogs twice, and the other teams once each.

=== Rounds 1–12 ===
West Coast's first match of the season was against Gold Coast on a 37 °C (99 °F) day at Optus Stadium. The Eagles beat the Suns by 25 points, although for the first three quarters, the two teams were neck and neck. Oscar Allen kicked a career-best 4 goals. In round 2, West Coast played Western Bulldogs at Marvel Stadium. After the Eagles were ahead by 14 points at three quarter time, the Bulldogs came from behind to win by seven points. West Coast's slow and steady kick–mark style of gameplay contrasted with the Bulldogs' high-speed, handball-heavy style. The game was described by AFL Media and ABC News as the best so far in the season. The following round, on Easter Saturday, West Coast comfortably beat Port Adelaide at home. The first half of the match saw the Eagles kick ten goals to Port Adelaide's two. The second half was much more even. Port Adelaide were unable to make a comeback, but were able to stop West Coast gaining a large amount of percentage on the ladder. The game finished with West Coast on 108 points and Port Adelaide on 71 points. Liam Ryan took one of his greatest marks off the back of Darcy Byrne-Jones. Max Laughton of Fox Sports described it as "one of the all-time great speckies". The win was marred by Luke Shuey injuring his hamstring, the match being his first one back after a pre-season hamstring injury. During the week after, Shuey had surgery on his hamstring tendon. West Coast stated that he would not be in any matches until at least after the Round 13 bye.

In round 4, West Coast faced St Kilda at Marvel Stadium. With the Saints coming off a thrashing in round 3, West Coast were the favourites to win. The Eagles looked like winning for most of the game, leading by up to 33 points during the third quarter, however, St Kilda made a comeback, kicking the final eight goals of the match, handing West Coast a 20-point loss. A calf injury to Shannon Hurn enabled debutant Isiah Winder to come onto the ground as a medical substitute, who scored a goal with his first kick. During the following week, Liam Ryan suffered a bone stress injury on his knee, ruling him out of playing for an expected eight weeks, and Jack Petruccelle suffered a hamstring injury, ruling him out for two weeks. The following round, West Coast played Collingwood at Optus Stadium. The Eagles won the match with 103 points to Collingwood's 76 points. Jack Darling and Oscar Allen kicked five goals each. Alex Witherden also played well on his West Coast debut, with 30 disposals and six rebound 50s. Collingwood's Mark Keane was suspended for one week due to tripping Josh Kennedy. Kennedy missed the following match as a result, with Adam Simpson describing him as "a bit sore". West Coast's round 6 match was against Geelong at GMHBA Stadium, a ground the Eagles have not won at since 2006. West Coast were thrashed by 97 points. The Eagles scored three goals to Geelong's two in the first quarter, but after quarter time, Geelong dominated. To make matters worse for West Coast, Jeremy McGovern received a groin injury. The loss was their largest loss with Adam Simpson as coach, and largest loss since 2009.

Going into round 7, West Coast were the most injury hit team in the AFL. The players on the injury list had a total of 1,191 games of experience. Among those injured were Tom Barrass, Shannon Hurn, Jeremy McGovern, Liam Ryan, Luke Shuey and Elliot Yeo. In round 7, West Coast played Fremantle in a highly anticipated Western Derby. With the Eagles sitting tenth on the ladder after a brutal loss, and the Dockers sitting at eighth on the ladder and a full win ahead of West Coast, it was looking like Fremantle's best chance since 2015 to break their 10 derby losing streak. However, after a close opening half, West Coast ran away with the win, with the final score being 132 to 73. The goalkicking accuracy of both teams was commended, Dermott Brereton saying "This is like a showpiece game" while commentating. Tim Kelly won the Glendinning–Allan Medal after having a career-high 42 disposals and game-high 14 clearances. The following round, West Coast got their first win outside their state, beating Hawthorn by 38 points at the Melbourne Cricket Ground. Unusually, neither team scored a goal in the first quarter. Brendon Ah Chee scored four goals in what was his first game in 2021. Then in round 9, West Coast beat Adelaide 106 to 76 at Optus Stadium. Jack Darling's second quarter was a standout, kicking five goals, including a nutmeg between Brodie Smith's legs. The game was the first game back from injury for Tom Barrass and Jeremy McGovern.

Liam Ryan made an earlier than expected return from injury in round 10 against Greater Western Sydney. The Giants gave West Coast yet another interstate loss, their fourth out of five interstate games at the time. The first three quarters saw twelve lead changes, with neither team being able to create a margin larger than two goals until the last quarter, where the Giants were able to get the final margin to 16 points. The Eagles had 31 less tackles than the Giants, and were criticised as looking disinterested throughout the match. Round 10 was Shannon Hurn's 291st match for West Coast, surpassing Dean Cox as having played the most matches for West Coast. The following round, Elliot Yeo was a surprise inclusion, being picked to play against Essendon after having been out with osteitis pubis for the previous nine months. Yeo had played for the Eagles' WAFL team the previous week as a way of gradually getting him back playing, however he was not expected to be playing in the AFL until after the bye round. During round 11, Essendon gave West Coast their first loss at home. The Eagles gave away a 29-point margin in the second quarter to end up with a 16-point loss. West Coast also sustained several injuries during the loss. Tim Kelly received a groin injury and Oscar Allen received a concussion and neck injury. Kelly and Allen were omitted from the team for round 12, along with Josh Kennedy, Alex Witherden, Jarrod Brander and Brendon Ah Chee, who were all injured. The odds looked to be against West Coast for their match against Carlton in round 12, but the Eagles were able to get their first win at the Sydney Cricket Ground since 1999, beating Carlton by 22 points. Liam Ryan stood out, garnering 17 touches and four goals, and Luke Edwards was solid on debut.

=== Rounds 13–23 ===
West Coast had a comeback win against Richmond in round 13 at Optus Stadium. The Tigers, who were the reigning premiers, and had an equal number of wins to West Coast at the time, lead by 22 points in the middle of the final quarter, however the Eagles kicked the final four goals. Josh Kennedy kicked the final goal with just 36 seconds to go, giving West Coast a four-point lead. Two intercept marks by Shannon Hurn in the final two minutes of the game prevented Richmond from kicking the winning goal. The win gave West Coast an 8-point gap on the ladder from the teams outside the top eight. West Coast then had a bye in round 14. After they bye, they faced Western Bulldogs at Optus Stadium. The Bulldogs thrashed the Eagles by 55 points, in what was West Coast's greatest ever loss and lowest score at Optus Stadium. At half time, West Coast's score was 16 points, having kicked just one goal in each quarter. The Bulldogs had 36 points, after inaccurate kicking caused them to have 12 behinds and 4 goals. The third quarter was evenly matched, with the Eagles kicking 20 points and the Bulldogs kicking 21. The Western Bulldogs ran away with the win in the fourth quarter though, kicking 41 points compared to the Eagles' 7.

West Coast suffered an even worse defeat against Sydney in round 16 at GMHBA Stadium, losing 26–118. This was West Coast's lowest score since round 23, 1992, and their third lowest ever. This was West Coast's second game at GMHBA Stadium in 2021, after their 97-point defeat at the hands of Geelong, and their eighth straight defeat at that ground, with an average margin 68 points. Fox Footy commentator David King said "we might be seeing the end of an era here. We might just be seeing the West Coast campaign of four of five years tip over the edge." Dom Sheed had a game-high 37 possessions, earning him 1 Brownlow Medal vote, despite the large loss. The Eagles then received their third loss in a row, against the last-on-the-ladder North Melbourne.

=== Results ===
AAMI Community Series results
Game	Day	Date	Result	Score			Opponent	Score			Ground	Attendance
Game	Day	Date	Result	G	B	T	Opponent	G	B	T	Ground	Attendance
1	Sunday	7 March	Won	9	13	67	Fremantle	8	9	57	Optus Stadium	20,116

Regular season results
Round	Day	Date	Result	Score			Opponent	Score			Ground		Attendance	Ladder
Round	Day	Date	Result	G	B	T	Opponent	G	B	T	Ground		Attendance	Ladder
1	Sunday	21 March	Won	12	10	83	Gold Coast	8	10	58	Optus Stadium	H	38,431	2nd
2	Sunday	28 March	Lost	14	9	93	Western Bulldogs	14	16	100	Marvel Stadium	A	21,391	7th
3	Saturday	3 April	Won	16	12	108	Port Adelaide	11	5	71	Optus Stadium	H	42,090	5th
4	Saturday	10 April	Lost	13	4	82	St Kilda	15	12	102	Marvel Stadium	A	16,710	6th
5	Friday	16 April	Won	16	7	103	Collingwood	11	10	76	Optus Stadium	H	54,159	6th
6	Saturday	24 April	Lost	5	9	39	Geelong	21	10	136	GMHBA Stadium	A	21,282	10th
7	Sunday	2 May	Won	20	12	132	Fremantle	11	7	73	Optus Stadium	H	0	8th
8	Sunday	9 May	Won	14	14	98	Hawthorn	8	12	60	Melbourne Cricket Ground	A	15,277	7th
9	Sunday	16 May	Won	16	10	106	Adelaide	11	10	76	Optus Stadium	H	43,427	7th
10	Sunday	23 May	Lost	11	11	77	Greater Western Sydney	13	15	93	GIANTS Stadium	A	9,046	7th
11	Saturday	29 May	Lost	11	5	71	Essendon	12	15	87	Optus Stadium	H	41,883	7th
12	Sunday	6 June	Won	14	11	95	Carlton	10	13	73	Sydney Cricket Ground	A	5,137	7th
13	Sunday	13 June	Won	13	7	85	Richmond	12	9	81	Optus Stadium	H	50,834	7th
14	Bye													7th
15	Sunday	27 June	Lost	6	7	43	Western Bulldogs	13	20	98	Optus Stadium	H	0	7th
16	Sunday	4 July	Lost	3	8	26	Sydney	18	10	118	GMHBA Stadium	A	9,520	7th
17	Monday	12 July	Lost	8	12	60	North Melbourne	10	10	70	Optus Stadium	H	30,515	8th
18	Sunday	18 July	Won	14	14	98	Adelaide	8	8	56	Adelaide Oval	A	24,554	7th
19	Saturday	24 July	Won	14	10	94	St Kilda	13	8	86	Optus Stadium	H	43,657	7th
20	Saturday	31 July	Lost	6	9	45	Collingwood	14	6	90	Melbourne Cricket Ground	A	0	7th
21	Monday	9 August	Lost	9	9	63	Melbourne	10	12	72	Optus Stadium	H	31,584	7th
22	Sunday	15 August	Lost	9	10	64	Fremantle	12	7	79	Optus Stadium	A	51,692	9th
23	Saturday	21 August	Lost	13	9	87	Brisbane Lions	19	11	125	Gabba	A	21,845	9th

Key
H	Home game
A	Away game

=== Ladder ===
Pos	Team	Pld	W	L	D	PF	PA	PP	Pts	Qualification
1	Melbourne (P)	22	17	4	1	1888	1443	130.8	70	Finals series
2	Port Adelaide	22	17	5	0	1884	1492	126.3	68	Finals series
3	Geelong	22	16	6	0	1845	1456	126.7	64	Finals series
4	Brisbane Lions	22	15	7	0	2131	1599	133.3	60	Finals series
5	Western Bulldogs	22	15	7	0	1994	1501	132.8	60	Finals series
6	Sydney	22	15	7	0	1986	1656	119.9	60	Finals series
7	Greater Western Sydney	22	11	10	1	1768	1773	99.7	46	Finals series
8	Essendon	22	11	11	0	1953	1790	109.1	44	Finals series
9	West Coast	22	10	12	0	1752	1880	93.2	40	
10	St Kilda	22	10	12	0	1644	1796	91.5	40	
11	Fremantle	22	10	12	0	1578	1825	86.5	40	
12	Richmond	22	9	12	1	1743	1780	97.9	38	
13	Carlton	22	8	14	0	1746	1972	88.5	32	
14	Hawthorn	22	7	13	2	1629	1912	85.2	32	
15	Adelaide	22	7	15	0	1616	1971	82.0	28	
16	Gold Coast	22	7	15	0	1430	1863	76.8	28	
17	Collingwood	22	6	16	0	1557	1818	85.6	24	
18	North Melbourne	22	4	17	1	1458	2075	70.3	18	

Updated to match(es) played on 21 August 2021. Source: AFL
Rules for classification: 1) points; 2) percentage; 3) number of points for.
(P) Premiers

== Impact of COVID-19 ==
At the start of the season, stadiums in Western Australia were restricted to 75% capacity due to restrictions brought about by to the COVID-19 pandemic. Optus Stadium's capacity under these restrictions was 45,000 spectators. From 11 April onwards, capacity limits were removed, enabling crowds of 60,000 to attend Optus Stadium.

On 29 April, the Thursday before the first Western Derby, Western Australian premier Mark McGowan announced that sporting venues in the state would be at 75% capacity from 1 May to 7 May, and that crowds would be required to wear masks. This came after a three day lockdown on the previous weekend for Perth and Peel due to a COVID-19 positive man being out in public for four days. Crowds were not permitted at sporting events since the lockdown started, but West Coast did not have any matches in Perth during that time. On 2 May, the day of the first Western Derby, McGowan announced that crowds were not allowed at sporting events in the state due to a separate incident where a hotel quarantine security guard and two of his close contacts tested positive to COVID-19. As a result, one of the state's most important sporting events had no crowd. On 15 April, capacity limits were removed again.

West Coast's round 12 match against Carlton, which was originally going to be at the Melbourne Cricket Ground (MCG), was moved to the Sydney Cricket Ground in response to Victoria's fourth COVID-19 lockdown. Due to that lockdown, Richmond played their round 12 match against Essendon at Optus Stadium instead of the MCG. Richmond then travelled to Sydney before coming back to Perth for round 13, avoiding going to Victoria. West Coast's round 14 match against Richmond was moved forward to the Sunday of round 13. No other fixtures had to be changed because both West Coast and Richmond were scheduled to have a bye in round 13.

At 11:00 am on the day of West Coast's round 15 match against the Western Bulldogs, just hours before the match went ahead, the Government of Western Australia banned crowds at large sporting events after a positive COVID-19 in Perth. This resulted in a crowd of 0 for the second time this season for West Coast.

Due to New South Wales's June COVID-19 outbreak, the Sydney Swans were relocated to Victoria. West Coast played their round 16 match against Sydney at GMHBA Stadium instead of the Sydney Cricket Ground as previously scheduled.

== Awards ==
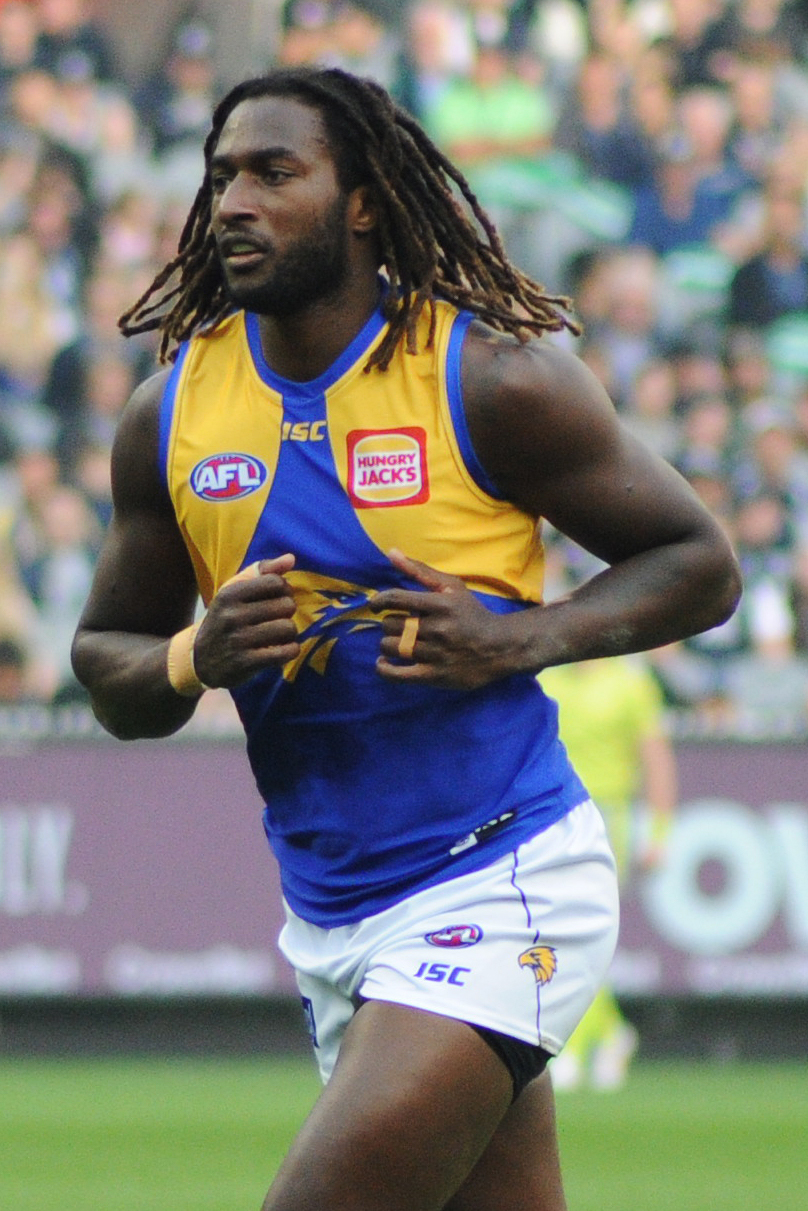
Nic Naitanui won the John Worsfold Medal.

Liam Ryan was nominated for Mark of the Year for his round 3 mark off the back of Port Adelaide's Darcy Byrne-Jones and in round 12 against Carlton. Nic Naitanui was the only Eagle to be selected in the 40-man initial All-Australian squad. Oscar Allen was the only Eagle to be selected in the 22 Under 22 team, announced on 26 August. The 22 Under 22 team is an honorary team created by the AFL Players' Association to recognise the 22 best players at or under 22 years old.

West Coast held their awards night on 15 September. Nic Naitanui won the John Worsfold Medal for best and fairest player. This made him the fourth West Coast player to win the award twice in a row, following Glen Jakovich, Ben Cousins and Elliot Yeo. He won it with 200 points, ahead of Dom Sheed (160), Andrew Gaff (149), Jack Redden (137) and Jack Darling (136). Points are given after each match, where four members of the match committee give each player 0 to 3 points. Other awards presented on the night were the Chris Mainwaring Medal for Best Clubman, awarded to Liam Duggan; Emerging Talent, awarded to Harry Edwards; Leading Goalkicker, awarded to Jack Darling, who had 42 goals; WAFL Eagles Best and Fairest, awarded to Kieren Hug; and the Eagles in the Community Award, given to Josh Kennedy and Jessy Edmunds (staff).

Awards received by West Coast players
Award	Awarded by	Player	Result	Ref.
Mark of the Year	Australian Football League	Liam Ryan (round 3)	Nominated	
Mark of the Year	Australian Football League	Liam Ryan (round 12)	Nominated	
All-Australian team	Australian Football League	Nic Naitanui	Shortlisted	
22 Under 22 team	AFL Players' Association	Oscar Allen	Selected	
John Worsfold Medal	West Coast Eagles	Nic Naitanui	Won	
Chris Mainwaring Medal	West Coast Eagles	Liam Duggan	Won	
Emerging Talent	West Coast Eagles	Harry Edwards	Won	
Leading Goalkicker	West Coast Eagles	Jack Darling	Won	
WAFL Eagles Best and Fairest	West Coast Eagles	Kieren Hug	Won	
Eagles in the Community Award	West Coast Eagles	Josh Kennedy	Won	
Eagles in the Community Award	West Coast Eagles	Jessy Edmunds	Won	

== WAFL team ==
West Coast's WAFL team was captained by Hamish Brayshaw. At the end of the season, they had four wins and fourteen losses, placing them last on the ladder.

== See also ==
- 2021 West Coast Eagles women's season
