= 2022 West Coast Eagles season =

West Coast Eagles
2022 season
- Coach: Adam Simpson (9th season)
- Captains: Luke Shuey (3rd season)
- Home ground: Optus Stadium
- Leading goalkicker: Josh Kennedy (37)
- Highest home attendance: 42,888 vs. Sydney (round 5)
- Lowest home attendance: 20,932 vs. Gold Coast (round 1)

The West Coast Eagles are an Australian rules football team based in Perth, Western Australia. Their 2022 season is their 36th season in the Australian Football League (AFL), their ninth season with Adam Simpson as coach, and their third season with Luke Shuey as captain. They finished the season with two wins and 20 losses, placing them 17th on the ladder.

== Background ==
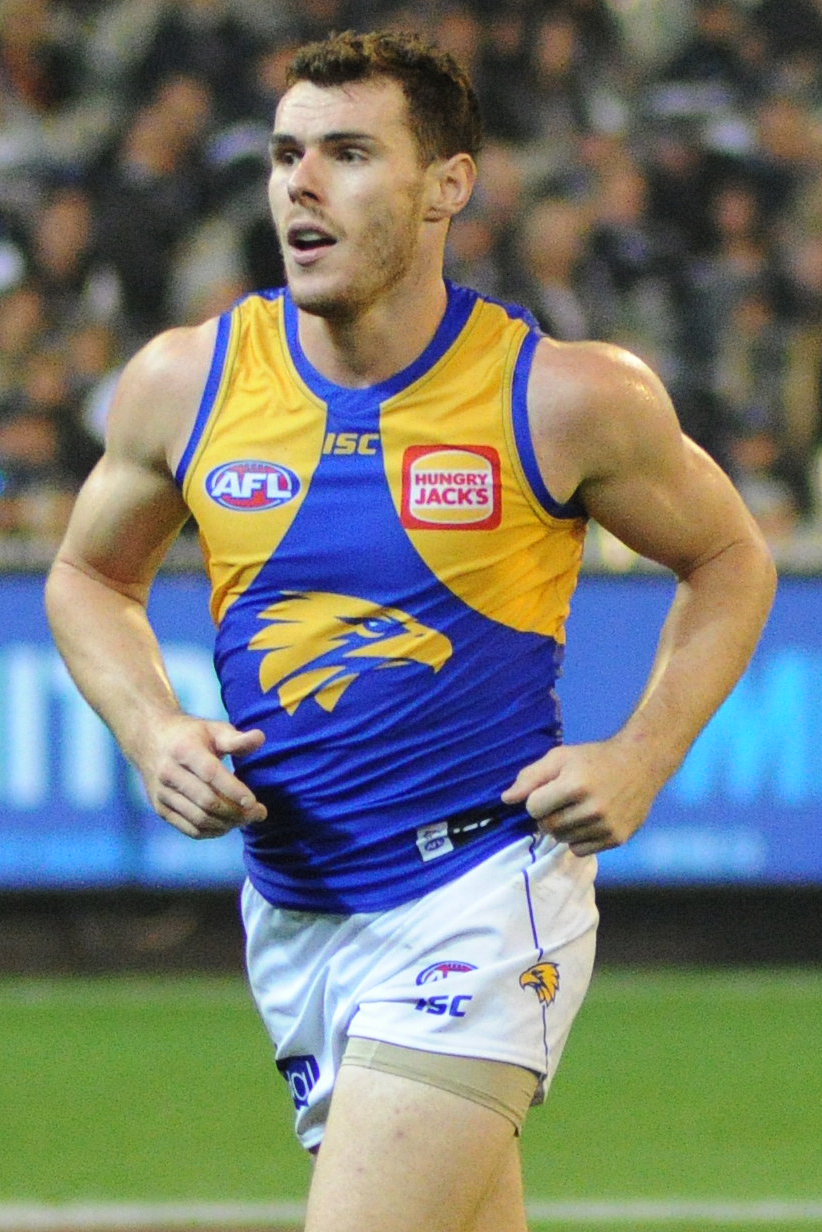
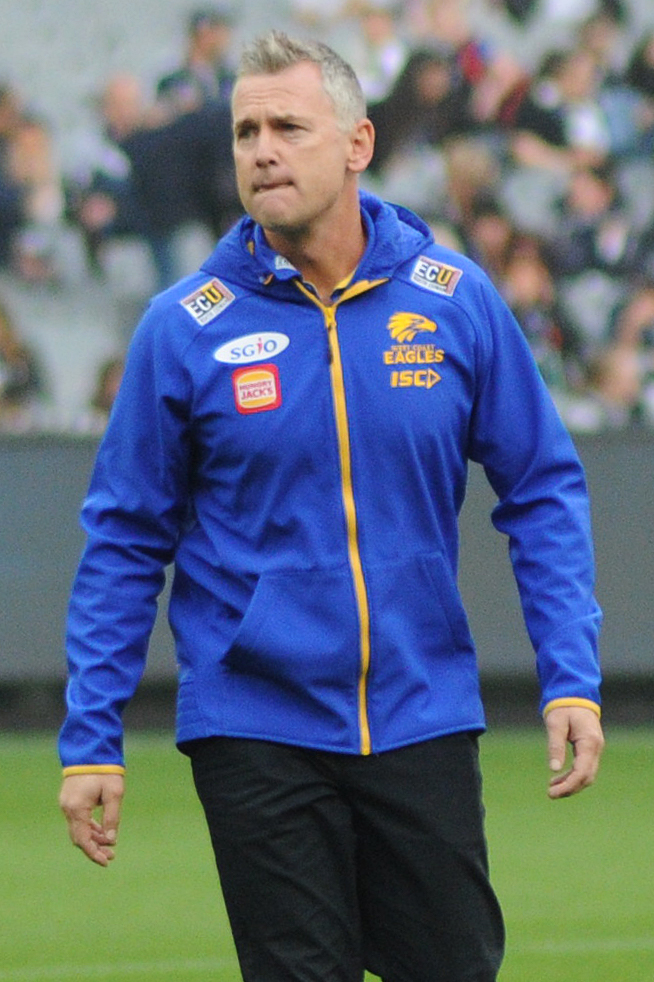
Luke Shuey (captain) and Adam Simpson (coach)

The West Coast Eagles are an Australian rules football team based in Perth, Western Australia, that competes in the Australian Football League (AFL). They ended the 2021 home-and-away season ninth on the ladder, causing them to miss finals.

In the off-season, Luke Shuey was voted captain for the third year in a row. Jeremy McGovern and Nic Naitanui were voted to become vice captains for the 2022 season. Tom Barrass, Liam Duggan and Oscar Allen were voted in as the remaining players for the leadership group. Josh Kennedy was the only person to leave the leadership group, stepping down as 2022 will likely be his last season. Adam Simpson was head coach for a ninth season.

== Playing list ==
=== Changes ===
Removals from playing list
Player	Reason	Games played	Ref.
Daniel Venables	Retired	21	
Brendon Ah Chee	Delisted	58 (31 at West Coast)	
Mark Hutchings	Delisted	120	
Nathan Vardy	Retired	77 (52 at West Coast)	
Brayden Ainsworth	Delisted	14	
Will Collins	Delisted	0	
Ben Johnson	Delisted	0	
Jarrod Cameron	Delisted	12	
Jarrod Brander	Delisted	22	
Brad Sheppard	Retired	216	

Additions to playing list
Player	Acquired	Former club	Former league	Ref.
Sam Petrevski-Seton	Trade	Carlton	AFL	
Campbell Chesser	No. 14, 2021 national draft	Sandringham Dragons	NAB League	
Brady Hough	No. 31, 2021 national draft	Peel Thunder	WAFL	
Rhett Bazzo	No. 37, 2021 national draft	Swan Districts	WAFL	
Jack Williams	No. 57, 2021 national draft	East Fremantle	WAFL	
Greg Clark	No. 62, 2021 national draft	Subiaco	WAFL	
Hugh Dixon	Supplementary selection period	East Fremantle	WAFL	
Luke Strnadica	Supplementary selection period	East Fremantle	WAFL	
Patrick Naish	Supplementary selection period	Richmond	AFL	
Tom Joyce	Supplementary selection period	Brisbane Lions	AFL	

=== Statistics ===
Playing list and statistics
Player	No.	Games	Goals	Behinds	Kicks	Handballs	Disposals	Marks	Tackles	Notes/Milestone(s)
Liam Ryan	1	17	19	12	153	34	187	71	39	
Jake Waterman	2	20	18	11	143	42	185	97	32	
Andrew Gaff	3	16	2	3	191	192	383	72	38	
Dom Sheed	4	1	0	0	11	9	20	2	4	
Elliot Yeo	6	5	0	1	50	25	75	21	8	
Zac Langdon	7	8	3	1	37	48	85	20	27	
Jack Redden	8	21	5	1	231	225	456	121	110	
Nic Naitanui	9	8	2	1	43	62	105	12	19	
Sam Petrevski-Seton	10	14	1	1	89	75	164	42	43	West Coast debut (round 1)
Tim Kelly	11	17	6	5	211	201	412	60	67	
Luke Shuey	13	17	3	2	207	157	364	48	100	
Liam Duggan	14	20	3	1	281	127	408	148	33	
Jamie Cripps	15	17	22	13	170	64	234	70	68	
Luke Edwards	16	3	1	0	19	15	34	11	5	
Josh Kennedy	17	15	37	13	96	37	133	58	21	
Brady Hough	19	15	0	3	127	59	186	74	14	AFL debut (round 1)
Jeremy McGovern	20	10	1	0	111	53	164	67	12	
Jack Petruccelle	21	8	8	8	61	20	81	30	18	
Isiah Winder	22	6	3	2	25	25	50	13	7	
Alex Witherden	23	13	0	0	207	72	279	100	26	
Xavier O'Neill	24	11	2	0	96	64	160	19	51	
Shannon Hurn	25	19	0	0	356	80	436	143	33	
Zane Trew	26	2	1	1	9	11	20	1	3	
Jack Darling	27	21	34	15	154	86	240	99	48	
Patrick Naish	28	11	1	3	120	64	184	42	15	West Coast debut (round 1)
Luke Foley	29	16	1	2	144	61	205	68	40	
Jackson Nelson	30	13	1	0	104	82	186	46	28	
Jamaine Jones	31	18	3	2	177	102	279	59	69	
Bailey Williams	32	17	6	6	83	74	157	31	35	
Rhett Bazzo	33	9	0	1	57	32	89	38	10	
Luke Strnadica	34	2	1	1	12	9	21	3	5	
Jack Williams	34	1	0	0	1	1	2	0	1	
Josh Rotham	35	13	2	0	103	38	141	71	21	
Connor West	36	14	3	3	100	98	198	34	52	
Tom Barrass	37	19	1	0	210	85	295	145	14	100th AFL game (round 1)
Greg Clark	39	9	1	1	52	46	98	24	31	
Callum Jamieson	40	9	0	0	29	45	74	16	20	
Hugh Dixon	41	10	4	3	44	41	85	26	19	West Coast debut (round 1)
Harry Edwards	42	17	0	0	125	43	168	94	18	
Junior Rioli	44	13	14	3	104	52	156	41	41	
Jake Florenca	46	1	0	0	9	10	19	3	7	
Brayden Ainsworth	46	1	0	1	3	3	6	1	2	
Aaron Black	47	1	1	0	11	4	15	4	2	
Stefan Giro	48	1	0	0	5	4	9	4	0	
Jai Culley	49	4	1	1	28	25	53	8	30	
Angus Dewar	49	1	0	0	7	0	7	2	3	
Declan Mountford	52	2	1	0	10	10	20	1	3	

== Season summary ==
The fixture for the 2022 season was revealed in December 2021, with each team scheduled to play 22 matches and have a mid-season bye. Only the first nine rounds had times and dates set for the matches, with the remaining dates released as the season progressed. West Coast are scheduled to play Geelong, Richmond, Fremantle, Gold Coast, and Adelaide twice, and the other teams once each.

=== Rounds 1–12 ===
West Coast's first match was against the Gold Coast Suns at Optus Stadium. This match saw the AFL debut of Brady Hough, and the West Coast debut of Sam Petrevski-Seton, Patrick Naish, and Hugh Dixon. Willie Rioli also played his first game since 2019, having served a two-year suspension for tampering with urine tests. West Coast lost the match 80–107, making this the first time that the Eagles had lost to the Suns at home. Tom Barrass, who was celebrating his 100th AFL game, kicked his first ever goal.

=== Results ===
Regular season results
Round	Day	Date	Result	Score			Opponent	Score			Ground		Attendance	Ladder	Ref.
Round	Day	Date	Result	G	B	T	Opponent	G	B	T	Ground		Attendance	Ladder	Ref.
1	Sunday	20 March	Lost	12	8	80	Gold Coast	16	11	107	Optus Stadium	H	20,932	15th	
2	Sunday	27 March	Lost	8	11	59	North Melbourne	10	14	74	Marvel Stadium	A	14,204	14th	
3	Sunday	3 April	Lost	7	5	47	Fremantle	15	12	102	Optus Stadium	H	38,920	17th	
4	Saturday	9 April	Won	14	3	87	Collingwood	10	14	74	Marvel Stadium	A	25,897	15th	
5	Friday	15 April	Lost	9	4	58	Sydney	18	13	121	Optus Stadium	H	42,888	16th	
6	Saturday	23 April	Lost	4	9	33	Port Adelaide	18	9	117	Adelaide Oval	A	28,587	17th	
7	Friday	29 April	Lost	8	8	56	Richmond	25	15	165	Optus Stadium	H	39,430	18th	
8	Saturday	7 May	Lost	4	6	30	Brisbane Lions	16	9	105	The Gabba	A	19,331	18th	
9	Sunday	15 May	Lost	5	8	38	Melbourne	16	16	112	Optus Stadium	H	27,488	18th	
10	Sunday	22 May	Lost	13	8	86	Greater Western Sydney	21	12	138	Giants Stadium	A	5,057	18th	
11	Saturday	28 May	Lost	9	6	60	Western Bulldogs	25	11	161	Optus Stadium	H	31,838	18th	
12	Saturday	4 June	Lost	8	9	57	Adelaide	13	10	88	Adelaide Oval	A	22,859	18th	
13	Bye													18th	
14	Saturday	18 June	Lost	9	9	63	Geelong	12	9	81	Optus Stadium	H	32,526	18th	
15	Friday	24 June	Won	16	11	107	Essendon	14	13	97	Optus Stadium	H	40,933	17th	
16	Sunday	3 July	Lost	13	15	93	Richmond	20	8	128	Melbourne Cricket Ground	A	39,391	17th	
17	Sunday	10 July	Lost	8	5	53	Carlton	17	14	116	Optus Stadium	H	43,359	17th	
18	Sunday	17 July	Lost	12	5	77	Hawthorn	15	12	102	Melbourne Cricket Ground	A	22,598	17th	
19	Sunday	24 July	Lost	10	2	62	St Kilda	14	6	90	Optus Stadium	H	35,665	17th	
20	Sunday	31 July	Lost	16	8	104	Gold Coast	16	11	107	Carrara Stadium	A	8,282	17th	
21	Sunday	7 August	Lost	13	8	86	Adelaide	16	6	102	Optus Stadium	H	50,117	17th	
22	Saturday	13 August	Lost	7	5	47	Fremantle	9	17	71	Optus Stadium	A	53,818	17th	
23	Saturday	20 August	Lost	7	4	46	Geelong	19	17	131	GMHBA Stadium	A	21,098	17th	

=== Ladder ===
Pos	Team	Pld	W	L	D	PF	PA	PP	Pts	Qualification
1	Geelong (P)	22	18	4	0	2146	1488	144.2	72	Finals series
2	Melbourne	22	16	6	0	1936	1483	130.5	64	Finals series
3	Sydney	22	16	6	0	2067	1616	127.9	64	Finals series
4	Collingwood	22	16	6	0	1839	1763	104.3	64	Finals series
5	Fremantle	22	15	6	1	1739	1486	117.0	62	Finals series
6	Brisbane Lions	22	15	7	0	2147	1799	119.3	60	Finals series
7	Richmond	22	13	8	1	2165	1780	121.6	54	Finals series
8	Western Bulldogs	22	12	10	0	1973	1812	108.9	48	Finals series
9	Carlton	22	12	10	0	1857	1714	108.3	48	
10	St Kilda	22	11	11	0	1703	1715	99.3	44	
11	Port Adelaide	22	10	12	0	1806	1638	110.3	40	
12	Gold Coast	22	10	12	0	1871	1820	102.8	40	
13	Hawthorn	22	8	14	0	1787	1991	89.8	32	
14	Adelaide	22	8	14	0	1721	1986	86.7	32	
15	Essendon	22	7	15	0	1737	2087	83.2	28	
16	Greater Western Sydney	22	6	16	0	1631	1927	84.6	24	
17	West Coast	22	2	20	0	1429	2389	59.8	8	
18	North Melbourne	22	2	20	0	1337	2397	55.8	8	

Source: afl.com.au
Rules for classification: 1) points; 2) percentage; 3) number of points for.
(P) Premiers
