= List of West Coast Eagles leading goalkickers =

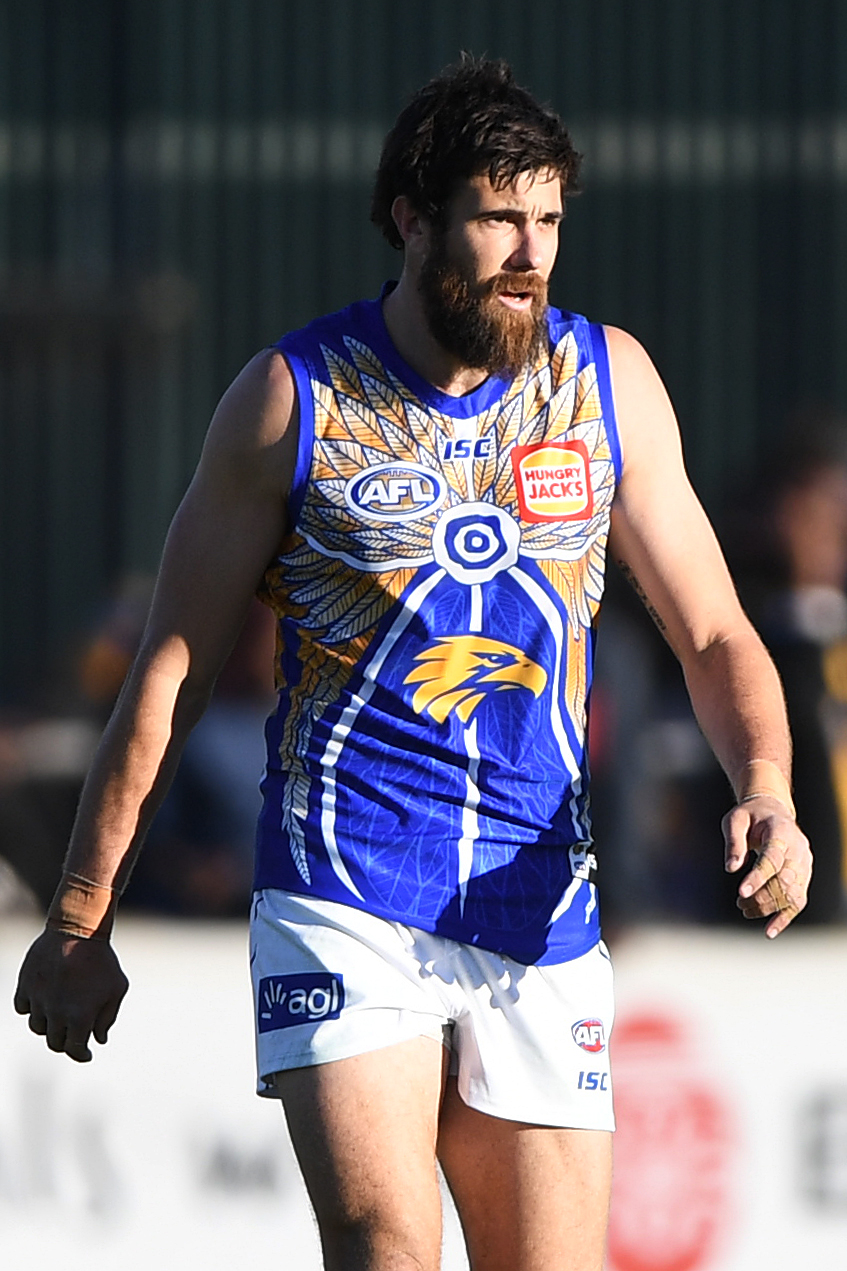
Josh Kennedy has been the leading goalscorer for the Eagles eight times

The following is a list of players who have kicked the most goals for the West Coast Eagles in each season of the Australian Football League (AFL), formerly known as the Victorian Football League (VFL), for both the men's team and the women's team.

Peter Sumich holds the record for the most goals kicked in a season by an Eagles player, having kicked 111 goals in 1991. Sumich also holds the club record for most consecutive times as leading goalkicker (six, between 1989 and 1994). Josh Kennedy holds the record for the most times as leading goalkicker (eight). In 1999, Scott Cummings became the first Eagles player to win the Coleman Medal for the most goals kicked in the AFL in one season. Kennedy joined Cummings in 2015, winning West Coast's second-ever Coleman medal, kicking 75 goals in the 2015 home-and-away season and adding an extra five in the finals series. Kennedy also holds the individual career goal scoring record for West Coast (712).

== AFL leading goalkickers ==
^	Denotes current player
+	Player won Coleman Medal in same season
†	Team played finals (which count for the tally)

Season	Leading goalkicker	Goals
1987	Ross Glendinning	38
1988	Ross Glendinning (2)	73†
1989	Peter Sumich	45
1990	Peter Sumich (2)	90†
1991	Peter Sumich (3)	111†
1992	Peter Sumich (4)	82†
1993	Peter Sumich (5)	76†
1994	Peter Sumich (6)	49†
1995	Jason Ball	48†
1996	Mitchell White	37†
1997	Peter Sumich (7)	33†
1998	Fraser Gehrig	42†
1999	Scott Cummings+	95†
2000	Phil Matera	49
2001	Troy Wilson	40
2002	Phil Matera (2)	46†
2003	Phil Matera (3)	62†
2004	Phil Matera (4)	61†
2005	Phil Matera (5)	38†
2006	Quinten Lynch	65†
2007	Quinten Lynch (2)	52†
2008	Ben McKinley	42
2009	Mark LeCras	58
2010	Mark LeCras (2)	63
2011	Josh Kennedy	59†
2012	Jack Darling	53†
2013	Josh Kennedy (2)	60
2014	Josh Kennedy (3)	61
2015	Josh Kennedy+ (4)	80†
2016	Josh Kennedy+ (5)	82†
2017	Josh Kennedy (6)	69†
2018	Jack Darling (2)	48†
2019	Jack Darling (3)	59†
2020	Josh Kennedy (7)	34†
2021	Jack Darling (4)	42
2022	Josh Kennedy (8)	37
2023	Oscar Allen^	53
2024	Jake Waterman^	53
2025	Jamie Cripps^	24
2026	Jake Waterman^ (2)	49

=== Multiple winners ===
Player	Wins	Seasons
Josh Kennedy	8	2011, 2013, 2014, 2015, 2016, 2017, 2020, 2022
Peter Sumich	7	1989, 1990, 1991, 1992, 1993, 1994, 1997
Phil Matera	5	2000, 2002, 2003, 2004, 2005
Jack Darling	4	2012, 2018, 2019, 2021
Ross Glendinning	2	1987, 1988
Mark LeCras	2	2009, 2010
Quinten Lynch	2	2006, 2007
Jake Waterman	2	2024, 2026

=== Leading career goalkickers ===
Player	goals	Average
Josh Kennedy	714	2.62
Jack Darling	532	1.78
Peter Sumich	514	3.43
Mark LeCras	441	2.01
Phil Matera	389	2.17
Jamie Cripps	323	1.24
Quentin Lynch	278	1.33
Chris Lewis	259	1.20
Brett Heady	237	1.52
Peter Matera	217	0.86

=== Most goals in a game ===
Goals	Player	Opponent	Round	Year	Venue
14.1	Scott Cummings	Adelaide	4	2000	WACA
13.3	Peter Sumich	Footscray	13	1991	WACA
12.2	Mark LeCras	Essendon	16	2010	Docklands
11.8	Peter Sumich	Essendon	15	1992	MCG
11.0	Josh Kennedy	Greater Western Sydney	8	2014	Subiaco
10.3	Josh Kennedy	Western Bulldogs	9	2011	Subiaco
10.2	Scott Cummings	Fremantle	6	2000	Subiaco
10.1	Josh Kennedy	Carlton	2	2015	Subiaco

== AFL Women's leading goalkickers ==
^	Denotes current player
†	Team played finals (which count for the tally)

Season	Leading goalkicker	Goals
2020	Hayley Bullas	2
2021	Grace Kelly	7
2022 (S6)	Aimee Schmidt	7
2022 (S7)	Aimee Schmidt (2)	5
2023	Kellie Gibson^	12
2024	Kellie Gibson^ (2)	8
2025	Lucia Painter^	10

== See also ==
- West Coast Eagles Honour Roll
