= Fred Robinson (footballer, born 1939) =

Australian rules footballer

Personal information
- Full name: Frederick John Robinson
- Born: 13 June 1938
- Died: 23 November 2000 (aged 61)
- Original team: Murchison
- Height: 184 cm (6 ft 0 in)
- Weight: 85 kg (187 lb)
- Position: Defender

Playing career^{1}
Years	Club	Games (Goals)
1960–62	North Melbourne	15 (3)
- ^{1} Playing statistics correct to the end of 1962.

Frederick John Robinson (13 June 1938 – 23 November 2000) was an Australian rules footballer who played for North Melbourne in the Victorian Football League (VFL) during the early 1960s.

A defender, Robinson was recruited from Kyabram District Football League club Murchison and played four games in his debut season but ten in the 1961 VFL season, gathering three Brownlow Medal votes. After managing only one appearance in 1962, Robinson joined Victorian Football Association (VFA) club Brunswick and performed well for the club as a full-back. He finished third in the J. J. Liston Trophy in 1965, and was a VFA representative at the 1966 Hobart Carnival.

Robinson's grandson Daniel Venables played for the West Coast Eagles in the Australian Football League.
