= Zane Trew =

Australian rules footballer (born 2002)

Personal information
- Full name: Zane Trew
- Born: 26 April 2002 (age 24)
- Original team: Swan Districts (WAFL)
- Draft: No. 12, 2021 rookie draft
- Debut: Round 16, 2022, West Coast vs. Richmond, at the MCG
- Height: 187 cm (6 ft 2 in)
- Weight: 81 kg (179 lb)
- Position: Midfielder

Playing career
Years	Club	Games (Goals)
2021–2024	West Coast	13 (4)

Zane Trew (born 26 April 2002) is a professional Australian rules footballer who played for the West Coast Eagles in the Australian Football League (AFL). Trew was drafted by the Eagles at pick 12 in the 2021 rookie draft.

== Early life ==
Trew played junior football for Hills Rangers Junior Football Club, becoming the first Australian Football player from Hills Rangers to be drafted to an AFL team. He was educated at Swan Christian College, where Trew's mother teaches. Despite living in Western Australia, Trew barracked for the Sydney Swans growing up. Trew was a talented junior, representing Western Australia in the 2018 Under 16 national championships, and being named in the Midfield in the 2018 Under 16 All Australian Team, averaging 18.7 disposals. Trew was also selected to play for the Australian Under 17 team against the New Zealand Falcons, and unfortunately dislocated his shoulder in the game. After being touted late first round to early second round selection, Trew was surprisingly not selected in the 2020 national draft with teams nervous to select an injury prone player. As a result, he was drafted by the West Coast Eagles with their first selection of the 2021 rookie draft.

== AFL career ==
=== 2021 ===
Trew debuted for the Eagles WAFL team, making an immediate impact and soon was awarded a one-year contract extension with the club. Trew played 11 games for the WAFL eagles, averaging 17.9 disposals and 4.9 tackles a game. He suffered a minor hamstring strain in the round 14 loss to his former team Swan Districts keeping him on the sidelines for the next two weeks. After recovering from his hamstring strain, Trew experienced a back complaint, which turned out to be a stress fracture, ruling him out for the season. While recovering from his stress fracture, Trew discovered he had shin splints, catapulting a one-two month injury to a nine-month injury.

=== 2022 ===
After spending nine months sidelined with shin splints, Trew returned to the Eagles WAFL side in round three of the 2022 WAFL Season. Trew only had ten disposals and four tackles for the match. Trew admitted he was rusty after missing nine months of footy, and was glad to come out of the game with no injuries. With his form slowly improving, Trew was named on the extended bench for the Eagles' round 10 clash against the Greater Western Sydney Giants. Trew was a late withdrawal from the WAFL eagles round seven fixture with an ITB complaint, causing him to miss two rounds. He returned in round nine against Subiaco, gathering 18 disposals as the eagles lost by 28 points. He then played a major part in the WAFL eagles first win of the season in round 10, collecting 17 disposals as the Eagles won by 41 points. Trew was named to debut against Richmond. Trew and Nic Naitanui were brought into the squad, with Josh Kennedy and Callum Jamieson making way. Trew had thirteen disposals and kicked a goal as the Eagles lost by 35 points. Despite the loss, Trew described his debut as unreal and that he loved every second of it.

=== 2024 ===
Despite playing 6 of the last 7 matches of the Eagles' season, Trew was delisted at its conclusion.

== Statistics ==
Legend
G	Goals	K	Kicks	D	Disposals	T	Tackles
B	Behinds	H	Handballs	M	Marks
#	Played in that season's premiership team	†	Led the league for the season	±	Won that season's Brownlow Medal

Season	Team	No.	Games	Totals							Averages (per game)							Votes
Season	Team	No.	Games	G	B	K	H	D	M	T	G	B	K	H	D	M	T	Votes
2021	West Coast	26	0	—	—	—	—	—	—	—	—	—	—	—	—	—	—	0
2022	West Coast	26	2	1	1	9	11	20	1	3	0.5	0.5	4.5	5.5	10.0	0.5	1.5	0
2023	West Coast	26	4	1	0	15	21	36	3	8	0.3	0.0	3.8	5.3	9.0	0.8	2.0	0
2024	West Coast	26	7	2	0	27	43	70	10	27	0.3	0.0	3.9	6.1	10.0	1.4	3.9	0
2025	West Coast	26	0	—	—	—	—	—	—	—	—	—	—	—	—	—	—	0
Career			13	4	1	51	75	126	14	38	0.3	0.1	3.9	5.8	9.7	1.1	2.9	0
