= Callum Jamieson =

Australian rules footballer (born 2000)

Personal information
- Nicknames: Ammo Jammo, Jam Sandwich
- Born: 31 July 2000 (age 26)
- Original team: Claremont (WAFL)
- Draft: No. 49, 2019 national draft
- Height: 200 cm (6 ft 7 in)
- Weight: 94 kg (207 lb)
- Position: Ruck

Playing career
Years	Club	Games (Goals)
2020–2025	West Coast	17 (0)

Callum Jamieson (born 31 July 2000) is a former Australian rules footballer who played for the West Coast Eagles in the Australian Football League (AFL).

== Early life ==
Jamieson grew up in the beachside suburb of Trigg, leading to a love of surfing from a young age. He spent his junior days playing for North Beach Junior Football Club and attended Newman College. Jamieson originally wanted to become a professional surfer or pilot, but, due to his size, neither of these dreams could be achieved. Jamieson started his football career as a key forward. After getting overlooked in the 2018 national draft, Jamieson added 8 kg and 4 cm and switched positions to ruck, playing in the Western Australian State Team at the 2019 AFL Under 18 Championships, breaking their ten-year championship drought. Jamieson's position change was a key part in Claremont winning the 2019 WAFL Colts Grand Final, with Claremont winning the hit-out count 43 to 29, largely thanks to Jamieson's 34 hit-outs despite going down with a shoulder injury in the last quarter After his breakout 2019 season, Jamieson was selected at pick 49 by the West Coast Eagles at the 2019 National Draft.

== AFL career ==
Because of the Eagles' Ruck depth, with Nic Naitanui, Tom Hickey and Nathan Vardy already established rucks at the club, Jamieson was drafted as a developing ruck/forward, who would be spending time developing in the WAFL to be ready for AFL level. Unfortunately, due to the coronavirus pandemic, the 2020 WAFL season was cancelled, haltering Jamieson's development. Jamieson was able to play 13 games during the 2021 WAFL season, playing ruck with stints as key defender. On 5 May 2021, West Coast, impressed with Jamieson's development, re-signed him until the end of the 2022 AFL season.

Jamieson added 7kg to his frame during the 2022 preseason and made his AFL debut in Round 2 against North Melbourne after the Eagles had twelve players placed into the AFL's health and safety protocols. Jamieson was named at full-back, and he didn't have a spectacular start to his AFL career, with North Melbourne forward Nick Larkey kicking five goals against him. Jamieson was subsequently omitted for the Eagles' next fixture. He was later brought back into the lineup as seven players were injured or placed into the AFL's health and safety protocols. Jamieson impressed on his return to the senior side, including notching up twelve disposals and thirteen hit-outs, and kept his place in the lineup for next four rounds. Jamieson managed nine games before being rested due to a groin injury in round 18.

After his first full pre-season, Jamieson signed a two-year deal, tying to the club until at least 2025. Jamieson was named at full-forward for the Eagles' season opener against North Melbourne, but he was tactically subbed out at three-quarter time after failing to make an impact on the match. Jamieson was subsequently dropped to the WAFL Eagles, where he limped from the field following an ankle injury in a WAFL practice match. Jamieson returned from his ankle injury in the WAFL, where he tuned his craft for the next three weeks before being called back to the senior team in round 9 for their Friday night blockbuster against the Gold Coast Suns. Jamieson held his spot for next week's clash against bottom-dwellers Hawthorn, but he was dropped after the Eagles lost 142–26, kicking no goals in the last half. After a strong showing in the WAFL, Jamieson was reinstated to the lineup in a top-versus-bottom clash against ladder leaders Collingwood, suffering a hip injury but courageously playing out the game. Jamieson failed to break into the senior team for the rest of the year, resulting in only four games being played.

Jamieson played no games in 2025 and was delisted at the end of the 2025 season after spending 6 seasons at the club and having played 17 AFL matches.

== Statistics ==
Legend
G	Goals	K	Kicks	D	Disposals	T	Tackles
B	Behinds	H	Handballs	M	Marks	H/O	Hit-outs

Season	Team	No.	Games	Totals								Averages (per game)								Votes
Season	Team	No.	Games	G	B	K	H	D	M	T	H/O	G	B	K	H	D	M	T	H/O	Votes
2022	West Coast	40	9	0	0	29	45	74	16	20	69	0.0	0.0	3.2	5.0	8.2	1.8	2.2	7.7	0
2023	West Coast	40	4	0	1	14	25	39	7	8	23	0.0	0.3	3.5	6.3	9.8	1.8	2.0	5.8	0
2024	West Coast	40	4	0	0	29	16	45	15	5	4	0.0	0.0	7.3	4.0	11.3	3.8	1.3	1.0	0
2025	West Coast	40	0	—	—	—	—	—	—	—	—	—	—	—	—	—	—	—	—	0
Career			17	0	1	72	86	158	38	33	96	0.0	0.1	4.2	5.1	9.3	2.2	1.9	5.6	0
