= Brayden Ainsworth =

Australian rules footballer (born 1998)

Personal information
- Born: 21 November 1998 (age 27); Esperance, WA
- Original team: Subiaco (WAFL)
- Draft: No. 32, 2017 national draft
- Debut: Round 8, 2018, West Coast vs. GWS Giants, at Spotless Stadium
- Height: 184 cm (6 ft 0 in)
- Weight: 80 kg (176 lb)
- Position: Midfielder

Playing career^{1}
Years	Club	Games (Goals)
2018–2022	West Coast	15 (4)
- ^{1} Playing statistics correct to the end of 2022.

Brayden Ainsworth (born 21 November 1998) is a professional Australian rules footballer who formerly played for the West Coast Eagles in the Australian Football League (AFL). He is a midfielder. Ainsworth made his debut in Round 8 of the 2018 season against the Greater Western Sydney Giants at Spotless Stadium.

Originally from Esperance, Ainsworth played for local club Ports Football Club at 16 before joining WAFL club Subiaco. He won a premiership with their reserves team in 2017. He played for WA in the 2017 U18 Championships, averaging 6.5 clearances. He was drafted by West Coast with pick 32, and wears number 33.

In May 2018, Ainsworth signed a two-year contract with West Coast, tying him to the club until 2020.

Ainsworth was delisted at the end of the Eagles' 2021 season after playing only two games for the year. Shortly after his delisting, his AFL career was resurrected after being placed on the Eagles' COVID contingency list given the wave of cases in Western Australia.
