= Connor West =

Australian rules footballer (born 1999)

Personal information
- Born: 7 May 1999 (age 27)
- Original teams: West Perth, (WAFL)
- Draft: No. 23, 2021 mid-season rookie draft, West Coast
- Debut: 18 July 2021, West Coast vs. Adelaide, at Adelaide Oval
- Height: 181 cm (5 ft 11 in)
- Weight: 80 kg (176 lb)
- Position: Midfielder forward

Club information
- Current club: West Perth
- Number: 44

Playing career^{1}
Years	Club	Games (Goals)
2018–2021	West Perth	40 (8)
2021–2023	West Coast	28 (7)
2024–	West Perth	15 (7)

Representative team honours^{2}
Years	Team	Games (Goals)
2021	Western Australia	1 (0)
- ^{1} Playing statistics correct to the end of 2024.^{2} Representative statistics correct as of 2021.

Connor West (born 7 May 1999) is an Australian rules footballer who played for the West Coast Eagles in the Australian Football League (AFL). He was recruited by West Coast with the 23rd draft pick in the 2021 mid-season rookie draft.

== AFL career ==
Connor West represented Western Australia at the 2017 AFL Under 18 Championships. He had hoped to be drafted in the 2017 AFL draft, but he was not. He still held hope of being drafted in the AFL after the success of mature age recruits from the WAFL such as Tim Kelly and Bailey Banfield.

West debuted in the West Australian Football League (WAFL) for West Perth against Swan Districts on Saturday, 21 April 2018.

West was recruited by West Coast with the 23rd draft pick in the 2021 mid-season rookie draft, as Jarrod Cameron was placed on the long-term injury list due to a season-ending ankle injury. This selection came as a surprise. He was West Coast's fourth father-son pick in the AFL, as his father, Robbie West played for West Coast in the 1990s. His selection came during a breakout season playing in West Perth's midfield, averaging 27 disposals and over 6 tackles per game. West had played for West Perth at WAFL level since 2018.

West made his debut against Adelaide in round 18 of the 2021 AFL season.

== Personal life ==
West is the son of former West Coast and Footscray AFL player Robbie West.

== Statistics ==
=== AFL ===
Updated to the end of the 2024 season.

Legend
G	Goals	K	Kicks	D	Disposals	T	Tackles
B	Behinds	H	Handballs	M	Marks

Season	Team	No.	Games	Totals							Averages (per game)						
Season	Team	No.	Games	G	B	K	H	D	M	T	G	B	K	H	D	M	T
2021	West Coast	36	5	1	4	35	28	63	16	13	0.2	0.8	7.0	5.6	12.6	3.2	2.6
2022	West Coast	36	14	3	3	100	98	198	34	52	0.2	0.2	7.1	7.0	14.1	2.4	3.7
2023	West Coast	36	9	3	5	40	52	92	16	17	0.3	0.6	4.4	5.8	10.2	1.8	1.9
Career			28	7	12	175	178	353	66	82	0.3	0.4	6.3	6.4	12.6	2.4	2.9

=== WAFL ===
Updated to the end of round 14, 2024.

Legend
G	Goals	K	Kicks	D	Disposals	T	Tackles
B	Behinds	H	Handballs	M	Marks

Season	Team	No.	Games	Totals							Averages (per game)						
Season	Team	No.	Games	G	B	K	H	D	M	T	G	B	K	H	D	M	T
2018	West Perth	44	10	3	0	75	73	148	36	33	0.3	0.0	7.5	7.3	14.8	3.6	3.3
2019	West Perth	44	14	3	4	143	85	228	54	49	0.2	0.3	10.2	6.1	16.3	3.9	3.5
2020	West Perth	3	9	1	3	84	78	162	28	47	0.1	0.3	9.3	8.7	18.0	3.1	5.2
2021	West Perth	3	7	1	3	106	82	188	30	45	0.1	0.4	15.2	11.7	26.9	4.3	6.4
2021	West Coast	21	3	1	2	45	29	74	14	16	0.3	0.7	15.0	9.7	24.7	4.7	5.3
2024	West Perth	44	11	4	1	163	119	282	50	55	0.4	0.1	14.8	10.8	25.6	4.5	5.0
Career			54	13	13	616	466	1082	212	245	0.2	0.2	11.4	8.6	20.0	3.9	4.5
