= Tom Hickey (footballer, born 1991) =

Australian rules footballer

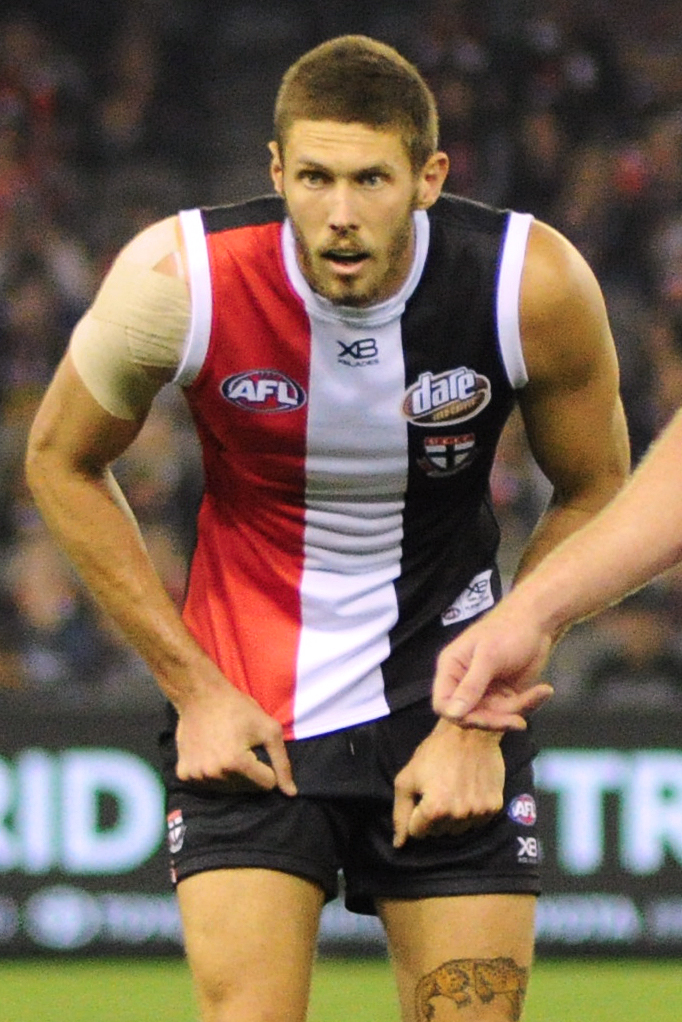
- Hickey playing for St Kilda

Personal information
- Full name: Tom Hickey
- Nicknames: Ruck Jesus, Hick, Tricky Hickey
- Born: 6 March 1991 (age 35); Brisbane, Queensland
- Original team: Morningside
- Draft: Queensland zone selection, 2010 AFL draft
- Height: 201 cm (6 ft 7 in)
- Weight: 94 kg (207 lb)
- Position: Ruck

Playing career^{1}
Years	Club	Games (Goals)
2011–2012	Gold Coast	12 (5)
2013–2018	St Kilda	67 (18)
2019–2020	West Coast	23 (9)
2021–2023	Sydney	49 (13)
Total		151 (45)
- ^{1} Playing statistics correct to the end of round 24, 2023.

Career highlights
- Inaugural Gold Coast AFL team; Grogan Medal: 2024

Tom Hickey (born 6 March 1991) is a former Australian rules footballer who played for the Gold Coast Suns, St Kilda, the West Coast Eagles, and the Sydney Swans in the Australian Football League (AFL).

== Early life ==
Hickey was born into a Brisbane family in which his father, Mick, is a former professional rugby league footballer who played 10 years of A-grade rugby league for Fortitude Valley in the Brisbane Rugby League. While in primary school between the ages of six and fourteen, Hickey played rugby league for the Redland Rugby League Football Club in the position of five-eighth. Upon graduation from St Anthony's Catholic Primary School he moved to Iona College and tried his hand at basketball, rugby union, water polo, athletics and volleyball. He made his main focus volleyball while in high school and represented the Queensland state team and the schoolboys team throughout his schooling life. During his last term of high school in 2008 he joined friends at Iona to compete in four football games at the Associated Independent Colleges school competition and in doing so played Australian rules football for the first time at 17 years of age. While playing he was spotted by an AFL Queensland representative and was invited to join the AFLQ Rookie Search Program.

== Junior football ==
At the beginning of 2009, Hickey joined the Morningside Australian Football Club's under 18 side. His under 18 team would win the premiership that year and Hickey finished second in the league best and fairest medal. The following year he was picked to represent Queensland in the 2010 AFL Under 18 Championships where he was the Queensland ruckman. He also established himself as a ruckman in Morningside's senior team and was a part of the 2010 QAFL premiership winning team. Matching up against former AFL players Peter Everitt and Trent Knobel in the grand final, Hickey's team would come back from a 20-point deficit at three quarter time to win the premiership. Following the 2010 season he travelled to Canberra to showcase himself at the AFL Draft Combine. He was the best performed ruckman in the agility test and equal second best among ruckmen in the beep test as well as being ranked second overall in the "clean hands" test. Hickey was drafted under zone concessions to the newly formed Gold Coast Suns in October 2010 and moved to the Gold Coast to begin his first AFL preseason.

== AFL career ==
=== 2011–2012: Gold Coast ===
Hickey made his AFL debut in round 22 of the 2011 season against Adelaide, kicking his first AFL goal. After two seasons with the Suns, Hickey requested a trade to St Kilda to be closer to his Melbourne-based girlfriend. Complications arose when the Gold Coast demanded a first-round selection for Hickey's service and the Saints eventually agreed to the deal.

=== 2013–2018: St Kilda ===
Hickey debuted for St Kilda in round 1 of the 2013 season in a loss to his former club Gold Coast at Metricon Stadium. He played as a second ruckman throughout the season, becoming the sole ruck in round 21 against Sydney after Ben McEvoy was substituted. The next week, Hickey recorded a personal best of 17 disposals against Gold Coast. He had the second-most hit-outs at St Kilda in 2013. After McEvoy was traded to Hawthorn, Hickey became the first-choice ruckman at the Saints. After a good start to the 2014 season, which included a 19-disposal and three-goal performance against the Greater Western Sydney Giants in round 2, Hickey suffered foot and quad injuries, restricting him to just one game after round 6. Knee tendonitis ended his season. In the meantime, Billy Longer played 12 games and established himself as St Kilda's principal ruckman. In 2015, Hickey became second ruckman after Longer, mostly playing as a pinch-hitting forward. He played 11 games and signed a two-year contract extension, tying him to St Kilda until 2017.

Hickey returned as the premier Saints ruckman in 2016, playing his best game at St Kilda according to coach Alan Richardson in round 1 against Port Adelaide. Hickey amassed 56 hit-outs and 20 disposals – career highs. He extended his contract until 2019 after playing 20 games for the season. In 2017, Hickey again fell behind Longer in the ruck pecking order. Strong form in a 2017 JLT Community Series match against Sydney – in which Hickey accumulated 29 disposals, 39 hit-outs and 18 contested possessions – did not translate to the regular season. Hickey suffered back, medial ligament, calf and right shoulder injuries, the latter of which required post-season surgery. When uninjured, he struggled to break into the St Kilda team as Longer continued to maintain his form. He was selected against Essendon in round 17 after Longer suffered a hamstring injury, but played poorly and was replaced the next game. Hickey played 13 games in 2018, suffering a left hamstring tendon injury late in the season against the Western Bulldogs.

=== 2019–2020: West Coast ===
After six years and 67 games with the Saints, Hickey was traded to the West Coast Eagles at the end of the 2018 season for pick 39 and West Coast's 2019 fourth-round selection. The Eagles also received pick 60 and St Kilda's fourth-round pick for 2019. Hickey was recruited to replace the departing ruckman Scott Lycett.

=== 2021–2023: Sydney ===
After two years at the Eagles in which he remained behind Nic Naitanui in the club's ruck stocks, Hickey was traded to his fourth club, the Sydney Swans, during the 2020 trade period. This made him the first AFL player to play for four clubs based in four different states. On Tuesday 22 August 2023 Tom announced that he will retire from AFL football at the completion of the 2023 season.

== Statistics ==
Updated to the end of the 2022 season.

Legend
G	Goals	K	Kicks	D	Disposals	T	Tackles
B	Behinds	H	Handballs	M	Marks	H/O	Hit-outs

Season	Team	No.	Games	Totals								Averages (per game)								Votes
Season	Team	No.	Games	G	B	K	H	D	M	T	H/O	G	B	K	H	D	M	T	H/O	Votes
2011	Gold Coast	40	2	1	1	5	14	19	2	6	8	0.5	0.5	2.5	7.0	9.5	1.0	3.0	4.0	0
2012	Gold Coast	40	10	4	3	41	56	97	42	17	101	0.4	0.3	4.1	5.6	9.7	4.2	1.7	10.1	0
2013	St Kilda	1	12	2	5	43	82	125	42	18	145	0.2	0.4	3.6	6.8	10.4	3.5	1.5	12.1	0
2014	St Kilda	1	6	3	1	23	47	70	24	19	144	0.5	0.2	3.8	7.8	11.7	4.0	3.2	24.0	0
2015	St Kilda	1	11	7	7	56	61	117	37	25	100	0.6	0.6	5.1	5.5	10.6	3.4	2.3	9.1	0
2016	St Kilda	1	20	3	7	103	162	265	60	65	574	0.2	0.4	5.2	8.1	13.3	3.0	3.3	28.7	1
2017	St Kilda	1	5	0	1	33	27	60	11	16	138	0.0	0.2	6.6	5.4	12.0	2.2	3.2	27.6	0
2018	St Kilda	1	13	3	5	74	115	189	40	37	316	0.2	0.4	5.7	8.8	14.5	3.1	2.8	24.3	0
2019	West Coast	16	20	9	2	120	129	249	58	51	388	0.5	0.1	6.0	6.5	12.5	2.9	2.6	19.4	0
2020 (Note: The 2020 season was played with 17 home-and-away matches per team (down from 22) and 16-minute quarters with time on (down from 20-minute quarters with time on) due to the impact of the COVID-19 pandemic.)	West Coast	16	3	0	0	6	10	16	5	3	42	0.0	0.0	2.0	3.3	5.3	1.7	1.0	14.0	0
2021	Sydney	31	21	10	7	193	154	347	60	45	506	0.5	0.3	9.2	7.3	16.5	2.9	2.1	24.1	4
2022	Sydney	31	16	3	2	120	115	235	49	26	348	0.2	0.1	7.5	7.2	14.7	3.1	1.6	21.8	0
Career			139	45	41	817	972	1789	430	328	2810	0.3	0.3	5.9	7.0	12.9	3.1	2.4	20.2	5
