= Liam Duggan =

Australian rules footballer

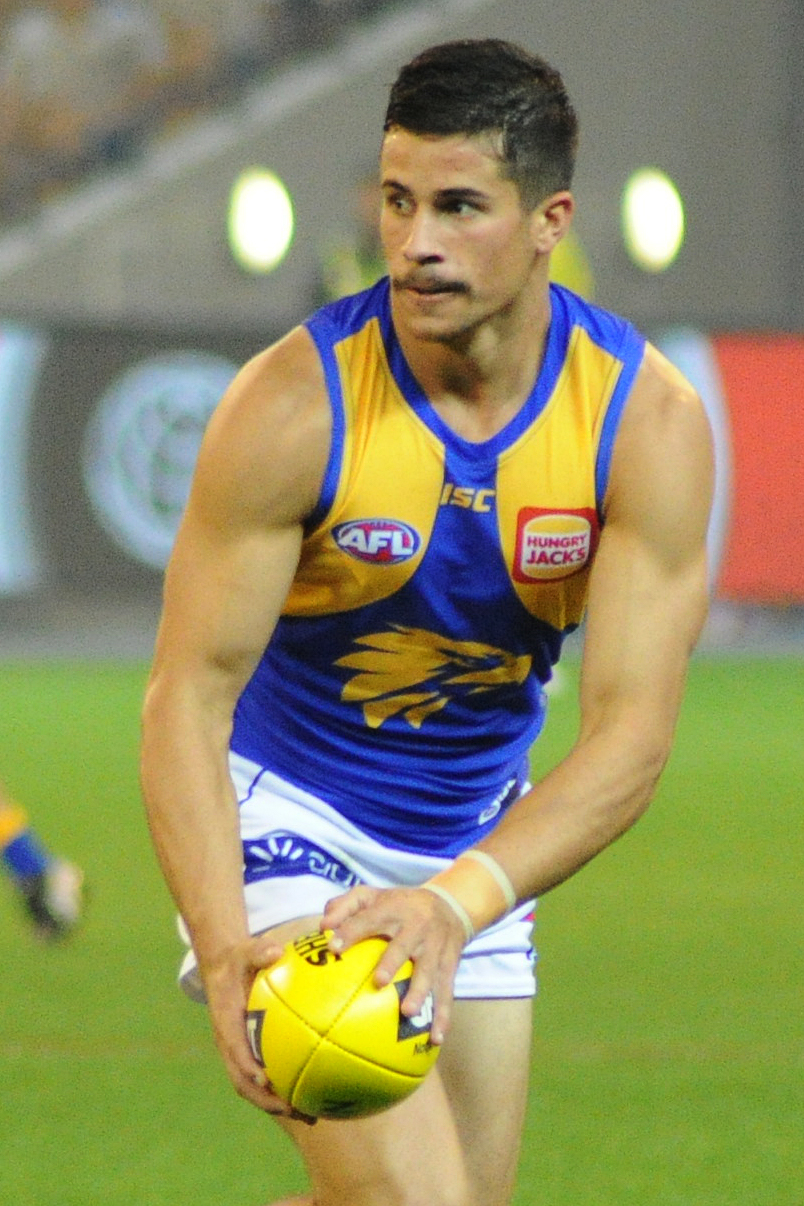
- Duggan playing for West Coast in April 2018

Personal information
- Full name: Liam James Duggan
- Born: 11 December 1996 (age 29)
- Original team: Western Jets(TAC Cup)/Bacchus Marsh Football Club(BFL)
- Draft: No. 11, 2014 National Draft,West Coast
- Height: 186 cm (6 ft 1 in)
- Weight: 83 kg (183 lb)
- Position: Defender

Club information
- Current club: West Coast
- Number: 14

Playing career^{1}
Years	Club	Games (Goals)
2015–	West Coast	221 (16)
- ^{1} Playing statistics correct to the end of round 22, 2026.

Career highlights
- AFL premiership player: 2018; West Coast captain: 2024–

Liam James Duggan (born 11 December 1996) is a professional Australian rules footballer who plays for and captains the West Coast Eagles in the Australian Football League (AFL). He also hosts the 4WD Podcast with YouTuber Ronny Dahl.

== Early football ==
Duggan played for Ballarat's St Patrick's College in the BAS school competition, the Western Jets at TAC Cup and Vic Metro in the National U18s. In 2014 the AIS-AFL Academy awarded him with the Ben Mitchell Medal.

== AFL career ==
Duggan was drafted with pick 11 of the 2014 National Draft. Duggan began his rookie season with East Perth but was elevated into the senior side, making his debut against Carlton in round 2 of the 2015 season. Duggan had a standout game in the 53 point victory over St Kilda Football Club in round 8, 2015. He racked up 23 disposals including six marks and four tackles, which impressed his older teammates, notably Luke Shuey. Duggan suffered a season ending knee injury during a round 17 Western Australian Football League game playing for East Perth Football Club after copping a knock to his posterior cruciate ligament in his right knee. He finished his debut season with 12 senior games of AFL.

In the 2018 AFL season, Duggan became a regular in West Coast's defence, he played nearly every game and impressed with his ability to lock down on small forwards as well as create drive out of the backline, and was a solid contributor during the victorious Grand Final. He suffered an ankle injury in the back half of 2019 and although he was able to return to action, he lost his spot in the senior side for the finals.

Duggan bounced back to have a career-best year in 2020, playing all but one game and recording a maiden top-five finish in the John Worsfold Medal as he made his 100th appearance late in the year. He spent time in the midfield early in 2021 but returned to the backline later in the year, before his season was ended early by a knee injury.

Ahead of the 2024 AFL season, Duggan and Oscar Allen were appointed as co-captains to replace retired premiership midfielder Luke Shuey.

In Round 8 2024, Duggan was awarded two Brownlow votes for his efforts against the Essendon side which included 8 marks and 2 clearances.

== Personal life ==
Duggan married Lauren Goold on 24 October 2024.

== Statistics ==
Updated to the end of round 22, 2026.

Legend
G	Goals	K	Kicks	D	Disposals	T	Tackles
B	Behinds	H	Handballs	M	Marks
#	Played in that season's premiership team

Season	Team	No.	Games	Totals							Averages (per game)							Votes
Season	Team	No.	Games	G	B	K	H	D	M	T	G	B	K	H	D	M	T	Votes
2015	West Coast	14	12	1	4	82	60	142	37	19	0.1	0.3	6.8	5.0	11.8	3.1	1.6	0
2016	West Coast	14	14	2	7	105	70	175	34	46	0.1	0.5	7.5	5.0	12.5	2.4	3.3	0
2017	West Coast	14	20	4	3	191	141	332	86	48	0.2	0.2	9.6	7.1	16.6	4.3	2.4	2
2018^{#}	West Coast	14	24	2	2	291	116	407	115	49	0.1	0.1	12.1	4.8	17.0	4.8	2.0	0
2019	West Coast	14	15	0	1	174	65	239	85	26	0.0	0.1	11.6	4.3	15.9	5.7	1.7	0
2020 (Note: The 2020 season was played with 17 home-and-away matches per team (down from 22) and 16-minute quarters with time on (down from 20-minute quarters with time on) due to the impact of the COVID-19 pandemic.)	West Coast	14	17	0	2	211	69	280	98	30	0.0	0.1	12.4	4.1	16.5	5.8	1.8	0
2021	West Coast	14	14	0	0	188	77	265	94	30	0.0	0.0	13.4	5.5	18.9	6.7	2.1	0
2022	West Coast	14	20	3	1	281	127	408	148	33	0.2	0.1	14.1	6.4	20.4	7.4	1.7	0
2023	West Coast	14	22	1	1	365	159	524	167	63	0.0	0.0	16.6	7.2	23.8	7.6	2.9	0
2024	West Coast	14	21	2	3	347	105	452	139	56	0.1	0.1	16.5	5.0	21.5	6.6	2.7	2
2025	West Coast	14	21	0	0	319	106	425	121	41	0.0	0.0	15.2	5.0	20.2	5.8	2.0	0
2026	West Coast	14	21	1	5	277	111	388	127	42	0.0	0.2	13.2	5.3	18.5	6.0	2.0	0
Career			221	16	29	2831	1206	4037	1251	483	0.1	0.1	12.8	5.5	18.3	5.7	2.2	4
