= Daniel Venables =

Australian rules footballer

Personal information
- Born: 19 November 1998 (age 27)
- Original team: Western Jets (TAC Cup)
- Draft: No. 13, 2016 national draft
- Debut: Round 1, 2018, West Coast vs. Sydney, at Optus Stadium
- Height: 187 cm (6 ft 2 in)
- Weight: 83 kg (183 lb)
- Position: Midfielder

Playing career^{1}
Years	Club	Games (Goals)
2017–2021	West Coast	21 (11)
- ^{1} Playing statistics correct to the end of 2021.

Career highlights
- AFL premiership player: 2018

Daniel Venables (born 19 November 1998) is a former professional Australian rules footballer who played for the West Coast Eagles in the Australian Football League (AFL). He was the youngest member of the Eagles' 2018 premiership side.

== Junior career ==
Venables originally represented Keilor Football Club and his school Penleigh and Essendon Grammar. Throughout his junior career, he mainly played as a midfielder or forward. In 2015, he played for Vic Metro in the 2015 under-16 national championships, breaking his leg against South Australia in the opening game after landing awkwardly in a marking contest. The same year, Venables had surgery on his shoulder. In 2016, he was named in the under-18 All-Australian side after a strong performance for Vic Metro in the national championships. Venables kicked six goals over four matches while averaging 13 disposals, 5.5 tackles and 6.3 contested possessions. He played three TAC Cup games for the Western Jets, limited by school football duties. Venables was unable to test at the AFL Draft Combine due to a foot injury, but was still considered a likely first-round pick at the upcoming 2016 national draft.

== AFL career ==
Venables was drafted by West Coast with their first selection and thirteenth overall in the 2016 national draft. His foot injury prevented him from participating in the 2017 preseason, but he recovered in time for a March reserves match with West Coast's West Australian Football League (WAFL) affiliate East Perth. At the start of the 2017 WAFL season, Venables was restricted to reserves matches on limited minutes, but built up form and played eight league games, averaging over one goal and 13 disposals. He was about to play his first AFL match against the Geelong Cats in round 13, but suffered turf toe in training, ruling him out for the season. Nevertheless, Venables extended his contract in July by two years (until 2020). He made his debut in the opening round of the 2018 AFL season in a twenty-nine point loss to Sydney at Perth Stadium. Venables played four games before injuring his ankle against Gold Coast. He was kept out for two months, and played another eight games before his first AFL final against Collingwood, where he recorded seven tackles. Venables impressed against Melbourne in the preliminary final, accumulating 17 disposals and kicking a goal. He was part of West Coast's premiership side, but had little impact on the Grand Final, recording only three disposals.

During Round 9 of the 2019 season, Venables suffered a severe concussion in the match versus Melbourne in which his head hit the hip of opponent Tim Smith during a marking contest, and despite being on the clubs list for both the 2020 and 2021 season, he formally announced his retirement due to the ongoing symptoms.

== Statistics ==
Statistics are correct to the end of round 9, 2019

Legend
G	Goals	K	Kicks	D	Disposals	T	Tackles
B	Behinds	H	Handballs	M	Marks

Season	Team	No.	Games	Totals							Averages (per game)						
Season	Team	No.	Games	G	B	K	H	D	M	T	G	B	K	H	D	M	T
2018†	West Coast	18	15	9	9	75	69	144	42	38	0.6	0.6	5.0	4.6	9.6	2.8	2.5
2019	West Coast	18	6	2	1	27	29	56	18	16	0.3	0.2	4.5	4.8	9.3	3.0	2.7
Career			21	11	10	102	98	200	60	54	0.5	0.5	4.9	4.7	9.5	2.9	2.6

== Personal life ==
Venables is the grandson of North Melbourne footballer Fred Robinson and the great-grandson of Australian Football Hall of Fame inductee Johnny Lewis. Venables became engaged to Scherri-Lee Biggs in December 2022. They married in March 2023. The couple have a daughter, born in February 2024.
