= Luke Edwards =

Australian football league player

Personal information
- Born: 12 January 2002 (age 24); Adelaide, South Australia, Australia
- Original team: Glenelg (SANFL)
- Draft: No. 52, 2020 AFL draft, West Coast
- Debut: 6 June 2021, West Coast vs. Carlton, at SCG
- Height: 188 cm (6 ft 2 in)
- Weight: 83 kg (183 lb)
- Position: Midfielder

Playing career
Years	Club	Games (Goals)
2021–2024	West Coast	37 (3)

Luke Edwards (born 12 January 2002) is a former Australian rules footballer who played for the West Coast Eagles in the Australian Football League (AFL). He was recruited by West Coast with the 52nd draft pick in the 2020 AFL draft.

== AFL career ==
As the son of former Adelaide player Tyson Edwards, he was eligible for a father–son selection, however, Adelaide declined to nominate him, leaving him free to be selected by any club at the 2020 AFL draft. Edwards was widely predicted to be a first round pick in the draft. He ended up as a fourth round pick for the West Coast Eagles.

Edwards made his debut against Carlton in round 12 of the 2021 AFL season. His second match, the following round against Richmond saw him get 27 disposals, 13 kicks and 14 handballs.

Edwards decided to step away from football to focus on his recovery from multiple concussions, and was delisted by the Eagles at the end of the 2024 season.

== Statistics ==
Legend
G	Goals	K	Kicks	D	Disposals	T	Tackles
B	Behinds	H	Handballs	M	Marks

Season	Team	No.	Games	Totals							Averages (per game)							Votes
Season	Team	No.	Games	G	B	K	H	D	M	T	G	B	K	H	D	M	T	Votes
2021	West Coast	16	8	0	1	57	43	100	26	10	0.0	0.1	7.1	5.4	12.5	3.3	1.3	0
2022	West Coast	16	3	1	0	19	15	34	11	5	0.3	0.0	6.3	5.0	11.3	3.7	1.7	0
2023	West Coast	16	14	0	0	86	73	159	42	37	0.0	0.0	6.1	5.2	11.4	3.0	2.6	0
2024	West Coast	16	12	2	1	72	58	130	39	23	0.2	0.1	6.0	4.8	10.8	3.3	1.9	0
2025	West Coast	16	0	—	—	—	—	—	—	—	—	—	—	—	—	—	—	0
Career			37	3	2	234	189	423	118	75	0.1	0.1	6.3	5.1	11.4	3.2	2.0	0
