= Isiah Winder =

Australian football league player (born 2002)

Personal information
- Born: 16 May 2002 (age 24)
- Original teams: Peel Thunder, (WAFL)
- Draft: No. 57, 2020 AFL draft, West Coast
- Debut: 11 April 2021, West Coast vs. St Kilda, at Docklands Stadium
- Height: 180 cm (5 ft 11 in)
- Weight: 79 kg (174 lb)
- Position: Midfielder

Playing career^{1}
| Years | Club | Games (Goals) |
| 2021–2023 | West Coast | 7 (4) |
- ^{1} Playing statistics correct to the end of 2022.

Isiah Winder (born 16 May 2002) is an Australian rules footballer who played for the West Coast Eagles in the Australian Football League (AFL). He was recruited by West Coast with the 57th draft pick in the 2020 AFL draft.

== AFL career ==
Winder made his debut as the medical substitute in West Coast's round 4 match in 2021 against St Kilda, replacing Shannon Hurn who injured his calf. He scored a goal with his first kick, becoming the ninth West Coast player to do so.

After playing six more games in 2022, he was delisted at the end of the 2022 AFL season, before being relisted in the subsequent rookie draft. He was then delisted again at the end of the 2023 season without playing another AFL game.
