= Oscar Allen (footballer) =

Australian rules footballer (born 1999)

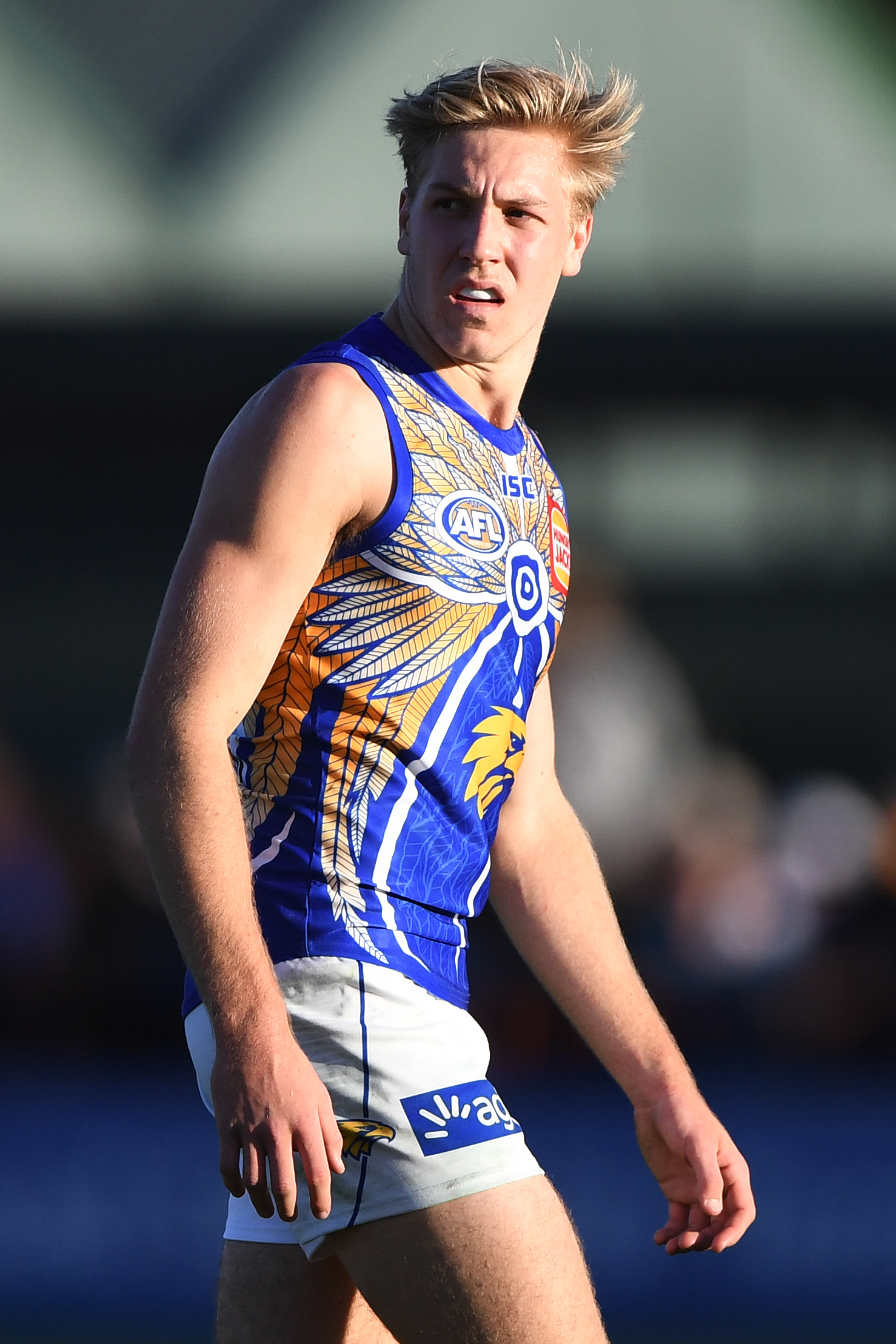
- Allen playing for West Coast in July 2019

Personal information
- Full name: Oscar Allen
- Born: 19 March 1999 (age 27); Perth, Western Australia
- Original teams: Whitford JFC; West Perth
- Draft: No. 21, 2017 national draft
- Debut: 8 July 2018, West Coast Eagles vs. GWS Giants, at Perth Stadium
- Height: 197 cm (6 ft 6 in)
- Weight: 98 kg (216 lb)
- Position: Key Forward/Utility

Club information
- Current club: Brisbane Lions
- Number: 4

Playing career^{1}
Years	Club	Games (Goals)
2018–2025	West Coast	105 (151)
2026–	Brisbane Lions	15 (25)
Total		116 (170)
- ^{1} Playing statistics correct to the end of the 2026 season.

Career highlights
- AFL premiership player: 2026; West Coast co-captain: 2024–2025; West Coast leading goalkicker: 2023; Larke Medal: 2017; 22under22 team: (2021); AFL Rising Star nominee: 2019

Oscar Allen (born 19 March 1999) is a professional Australian rules footballer who plays for the Brisbane Lions in the Australian Football League (AFL).

== Junior career ==
Allen is from Perth, Western Australia. He played junior football at Whitford Junior Football Club, and also played basketball. As a junior, he played as a small defender, before a 10 cm (3.9 in) growth spurt at 16 meant he started to play key-position roles. Allen joined West Australian Football League club West Perth in 2016. He initially played at colts level. At West Perth, Allen played as an inside midfielder, a centre-half forward, a centre half-back and a ruckman.

He played for his state as co-captain in the 2017 AFL Under 18 Championships and won the Larke Medal as the best player in the first division after kicking 11 goals over four games. Allen said he was "really excited" about the award, but it "wasn't something that went to [his] head". He played as a centre half-forward, but was named in the Under 18 All-Australian side as a full-forward, confusing WA coach Peter Sumich. Allen was lauded as a possible early pick in the 2017 national draft after his performance. He was compared to former St Kilda captain Nick Riewoldt by his West Perth coach Bill Monaghan, and to Essendon forward Jake Stringer. Allen played two reserves matches with West Perth, where he played with his older brother Angus. He also played two senior matches to give him experience at a higher level.

== AFL career ==
=== West Coast ===
After speculation that West Coast would take Allen with their first selection (pick 13) in the 2017 draft, he was eventually selected by the club with pick 21. He arrived at the Eagles with a tibia stress fracture, which Allen believed was character building. Forwards coach Jaymie Graham said that senior players were impressed with his work ethic. He made his debut in round 16 of the 2018 season against the Greater Western Sydney Giants at Perth Stadium. He accumulated seven disposals at 100% efficiency, two marks and three tackles. Allen singled out his smother on Giant Matt de Boer and watching Nic Naitanui take a flying mark as highlights. Allen played a defensive role in his AFL debut with West Coast, but said that he was happy wherever coach Adam Simpson played him and that he was sure he would play as a forward at some point.

Allen received a Rising Star nomination in round 21 of the 2019 AFL season for his three goal effort against Adelaide at Perth Stadium.

In the 2023 AFL season, Allen kicked 53 goals and finished runner-up to Tim Kelly in the Club Champion Award.

In November 2023, Allen was named co-captain of the Eagles.

On 19 June 2025, Allen was ruled out for the rest of the 2025 season after opting to undergo knee surgery while recovering from his calf and Achilles tendon injury. He damaged his calf and Achilles four days earlier against Carlton and subsequently decided to undergo patella tendon surgery to fix an ongoing issue with his left knee.

On August 24, 2025, just one day after their season came to end, the West Coast Eagles confirmed that Allen had advised the Club of his intention to explore his options as a restricted free agent. Speculation on where Allen would be playing in 2026 had occurred for some time, after news broke he had met with Hawthorn coach Sam Mitchell in early May, before taking time away from the club. Following the end of the Eagles' season, Allen informed the club's hierarchy of his plans to join Brisbane.

=== Brisbane ===
Allen joined Brisbane as a free agent for the 2026 season onwards. Allen was immediately appointed to the Brisbane leadership group.

After a twelve-goal start to his 2026 season, Allen suffered a foot fracture in the Lions' round 7 clash with the Adelaide Crows at the Gabba on April 26, 2026. Two days later, it was announced he would miss at least the next three months of the season. He returned to the Brisbane side in Round 21, and played in his first finals win on 12 September in Brisbane's Semi Final victory against the Adelaide Crows. He kicked two goals in the Lions' victorious 2026 AFL Grand Final performance.

== Personal life ==
Allen has two brothers: Gareth, a lacrosse player who won a bronze medal for Australia at the 2010 World Lacrosse Championship in Manchester; and Angus, who has played for West Perth Football Club's reserves. He was educated at St Mark's Anglican Community School.

== Statistics ==
Updated to the end of the 2026 season.

Legend
G	Goals	K	Kicks	D	Disposals	T	Tackles
B	Behinds	H	Handballs	M	Marks
#	Played in that season's premiership team

Season	Team	No.	Games	Totals							Averages (per game)							Votes
Season	Team	No.	Games	G	B	K	H	D	M	T	G	B	K	H	D	M	T	Votes
2018	West Coast	12	2	0	1	13	8	21	8	5	0.0	0.5	6.5	4.0	10.5	4.0	2.5	0
2019	West Coast	12	21	20	11	134	79	213	75	58	1.0	0.5	6.4	3.8	10.1	3.6	2.8	0
2020 (Note: The 2020 season was played with 17 home-and-away matches per team (down from 22) and 16-minute quarters with time on (down from 20-minute quarters with time on) due to the impact of the COVID-19 pandemic.)	West Coast	12	15	18	8	86	46	132	44	41	1.2	0.5	5.7	3.1	8.8	2.9	2.7	5
2021	West Coast	12	21	28	16	154	58	212	99	39	1.3	0.8	7.3	2.8	10.1	4.7	1.9	6
2022	West Coast	12	0	—	—	—	—	—	—	—	—	—	—	—	—	—	—	0
2023	West Coast	12	23	53	23	170	68	238	113	37	2.3	1.0	7.4	3.0	10.3	4.9	1.6	0
2024	West Coast	12	11	20	16	78	27	105	52	13	1.8	1.5	7.1	2.5	9.5	4.7	1.2	1
2025	West Coast	12	12	12	5	81	25	106	40	29	1.0	0.4	6.8	2.1	8.8	3.3	2.4	0
2026^{#}	Brisbane Lions	4	15	25	12	87	29	116	52	20	1.7	0.8	5.8	1.9	7.7	3.5	1.3	0
Career			120	176	92	803	340	1143	483	242	1.5	0.8	6.7	2.8	9.5	4.0	2.0	12
