= Jack Darling =

Australian rules footballer (born 1992)

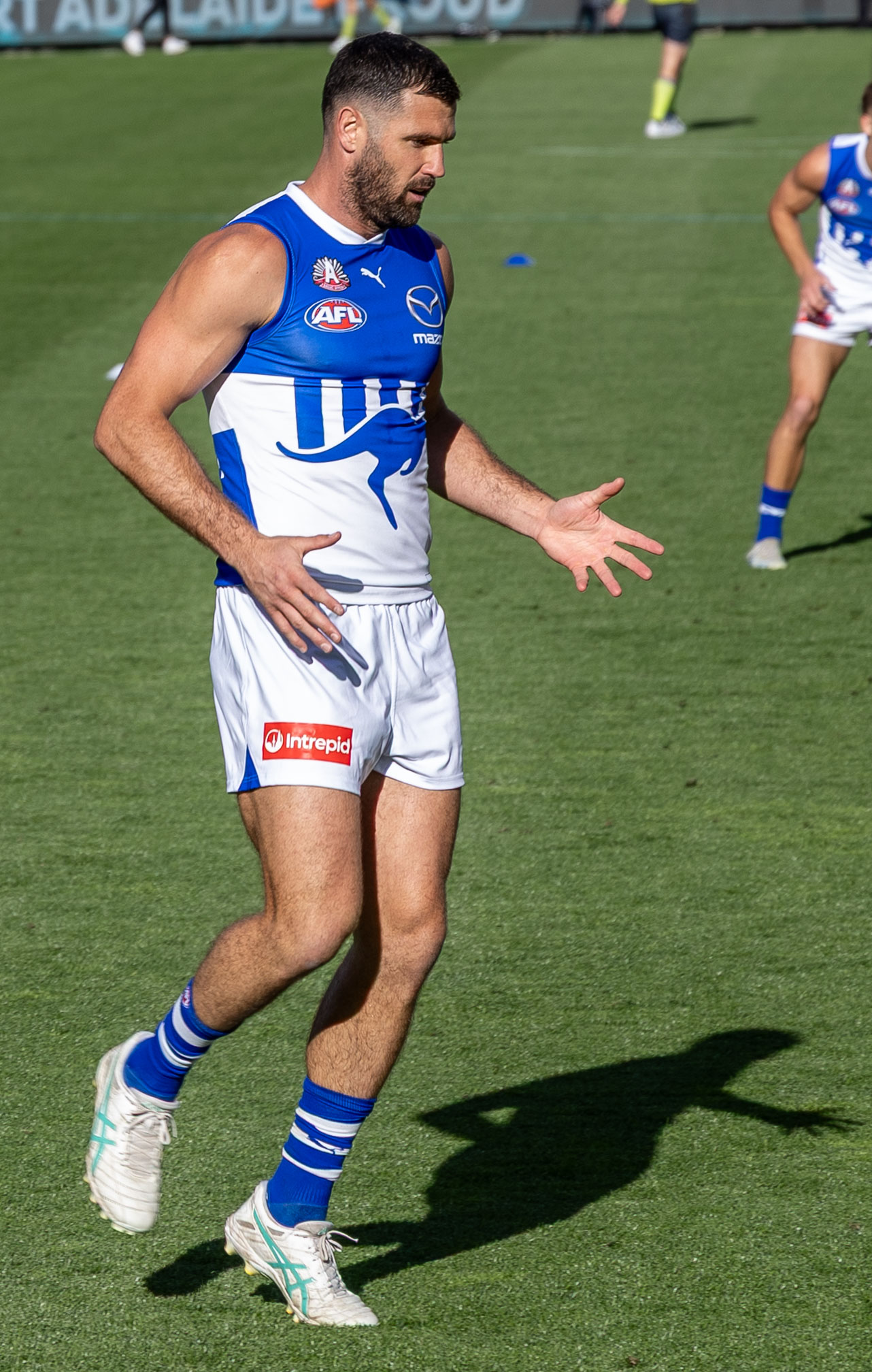
- Darling playing for North Melbourne in 2025

Personal information
- Full name: Jack Darling
- Nickname: JD
- Born: 13 June 1992 (age 34)
- Original team: West Perth (WAFL)
- Draft: No. 26, 2010 national draft
- Height: 191 cm (6 ft 3 in)
- Weight: 95 kg (209 lb)
- Position: Key forward

Club information
- Current club: North Melbourne
- Number: 27

Playing career^{1}
Years	Club	Games (Goals)
2011–2024	West Coast	298 (532)
2025–	North Melbourne	44 (60)
Total		342 (592)
- ^{1} Playing statistics correct to the end of 2026.

Career highlights
- AFL premiership player: 2018; 4x West Coast leading goalkicker: 2012, 2018, 2019, 2021; All-Australian team: 2019; 3× 22under22 team: 2012, 2013, 2014; AFL Rising Star nominee: 2011

Jack Darling (born 13 June 1992) is an Australian rules footballer who plays for the North Melbourne Football Club in the Australian Football League (AFL), having previously been a premiership player with the West Coast Eagles. Darling was recruited from West Perth in the WAFL with pick 26 in the 2010 AFL draft.

== Early life ==
Darling was raised in Perth's northern suburbs and played junior football with Sorrento Duncraig Football Club representing Western Australia at both U16 and U18 level (in 2009).

Too young to enter the 2009 AFL draft, he was predicted during the 2009 season to be a top-five draft pick, but some off-field incidents, including being suspended from his school and spending time in hospital following a fight at a nightclub, saw him slip to the first selection of the second round in the 2010 Draft.

== AFL career ==
Darling made his AFL debut for West Coast against North Melbourne in round 1 of the 2011 season, kicking 2 goals.

In round 6, Darling was nominated for the 2011 AFL Rising Star after an impressive 3 goal display against Melbourne.

Darling was a part of West Coast's 2018 Premiership Side, which defeated Collingwood by 5 points in the 2018 Grand Final. He had a very quiet first half, failing to register a mark and having close to zero influence on the game. However, he turned that around in the third quarter and finished the game with 7 marks, 12 disposals and a goal, playing a pivotal role in helping West Coast achieve a remarkable comeback.

On 21 January 2022, the AFL's requirement for Western Australian-based players to get their first COVID-19 vaccine dose passed, with Darling initially being the only Western Australian player not to get his first vaccine dose. The AFL required WA players to get their second dose by 18 February 2022, but the Western Australian government requires players get their second dose by 31 January 2022. Darling received his vaccination in time to play the 2022 season clearing both the AFL and local Government requirements. In the 2023 pre-season, Darling sued Seven West for defamation over their coverage on Darling's alleged vaccine hesitancy.

Shortly after the conclusion of West Coast's 2024 season, Darling requested a trade to North Melbourne, where he had been offered a two-year contract. The trade request came after 14 seasons with the club, including 298 games and 532 goals. The trade officially went through on 7 October 2024.

== Playing style ==
While Darling predominantly played in the forward line early in his career, from 2014 onwards, he enjoyed stints in the midfield where he prospered in a tall half-forward role.

As a forward, Darling is renowned for his tackling pressure and goal sense. He often creates unlikely goal-scoring opportunities through his unrelenting pursuit of opposition defenders in possession of the ball. His athleticism and endurance allow him to regularly find space from his opponents throughout the course of a game, and he continually strives to make himself a viable marking target inside his team's forward 50. He is just as effective on the ground as he is in the air. Darling has a black belt in martial arts and taekwondo, and often performs rapid lunges to propel himself from the ground using his hips and torso. His father, David, teaches martial arts as a discipline in Perth.

Jack Darling attracted comparisons to AFL greats Wayne Carey and Jonathan Brown.

== Statistics ==
Updated to the end of round 22, 2026.

Legend
G	Goals	K	Kicks	D	Disposals	T	Tackles
B	Behinds	H	Handballs	M	Marks
#	Played in that season's premiership team

Season	Team	No.	Games	Totals							Averages (per game)							Votes
Season	Team	No.	Games	G	B	K	H	D	M	T	G	B	K	H	D	M	T	Votes
2011	West Coast	27	23	24	11	165	119	284	103	93	1.0	0.5	7.2	5.2	12.3	4.5	4.0	1
2012	West Coast	27	24	53	25	198	68	266	131	68	2.2	1.0	8.3	2.8	11.1	5.5	2.8	2
2013	West Coast	27	21	42	27	168	80	248	96	58	2.0	1.3	8.0	3.8	11.8	4.6	2.8	1
2014	West Coast	27	22	39	29	208	106	314	106	86	1.8	1.3	9.5	4.8	14.3	4.8	3.9	0
2015	West Coast	27	15	26	18	108	63	171	78	46	1.7	1.2	7.2	4.2	11.4	5.2	3.1	3
2016	West Coast	27	23	44	21	156	125	281	123	61	1.9	0.9	6.8	5.4	12.2	5.3	2.7	1
2017	West Coast	27	23	43	25	184	93	277	119	67	1.9	1.1	8.0	4.0	12.0	5.2	2.9	2
2018^{#}	West Coast	27	21	48	27	188	88	276	129	50	2.3	1.3	9.0	4.2	13.1	6.1	2.4	11
2019	West Coast	27	24	59	18	203	84	287	112	64	2.5	0.8	8.5	3.5	12.0	4.7	2.7	8
2020 (Note: The 2020 season was played with 17 home-and-away matches per team (down from 22) and 16-minute quarters with time on (down from 20-minute quarters with time on) due to the impact of the COVID-19 pandemic.)	West Coast	27	18	30	12	112	57	169	64	35	1.7	0.7	6.2	3.2	9.4	3.6	1.9	0
2021	West Coast	27	22	42	19	176	91	267	123	53	1.9	0.9	8.0	4.1	12.1	5.6	2.4	4
2022	West Coast	27	21	34	15	153	86	239	99	48	1.6	0.7	7.3	4.1	11.4	4.7	2.3	2
2023	West Coast	27	20	26	19	129	75	204	80	51	1.3	1.0	6.5	3.8	10.2	4.0	2.6	0
2024	West Coast	27	21	22	12	124	86	210	68	61	1.0	0.6	5.9	4.1	10.0	3.2	2.9	0
2025	North Melbourne	28	22	24	8	139	76	215	74	48	1.1	0.4	6.3	3.5	9.8	3.4	2.2	0
2026	North Melbourne	27	20	31	12	136	82	218	90	48	1.6	0.6	6.8	4.1	10.9	4.5	2.4	0
Career			340	587	298	2547	1379	3926	1595	937	1.7	0.9	7.5	4.1	11.5	4.7	2.8	35
