= Zac Langdon =

Australian rules footballer

Personal information
- Born: 13 November 1995 (age 30); Karratha
- Original team: Claremont (WAFL)
- Draft: No. 56, 2017 national draft
- Debut: Round 1, 2018, Greater Western Sydney vs. Western Bulldogs, at UNSW Canberra Oval
- Height: 177 cm (5 ft 10 in)
- Weight: 80 kg (176 lb)
- Position: Forward

Club information
- Current club: West Coast
- Number: 7

Playing career^{1}
Years	Club	Games (Goals)
2018–2020	Greater Western Sydney	31 (23)
2021–2022	West Coast	25 (9)
Total		56 (32)
- ^{1} Playing statistics correct to the end of 2022.

Zac Langdon (born 13 November 1995) is a former professional Australian rules football player for the West Coast Eagles in the Australian Football League (AFL). He played for Dampier Sharks. He was then drafted by Greater Western Sydney with their fifth selection and fifty-sixth overall in the 2017 national draft. He made his debut in the eighty-two point win and kicked a goal against the Western Bulldogs at UNSW Canberra Oval in the opening round of the 2018 season.

At the conclusion of the 2020 AFL season, Langdon returned to his home state of Western Australia, after being traded to the West Coast Eagles.

Langdon was delisted at the end of the 2022 AFL season with a year still to run on his contract.
