= Harry Edwards (Australian footballer) =

Australian football league player

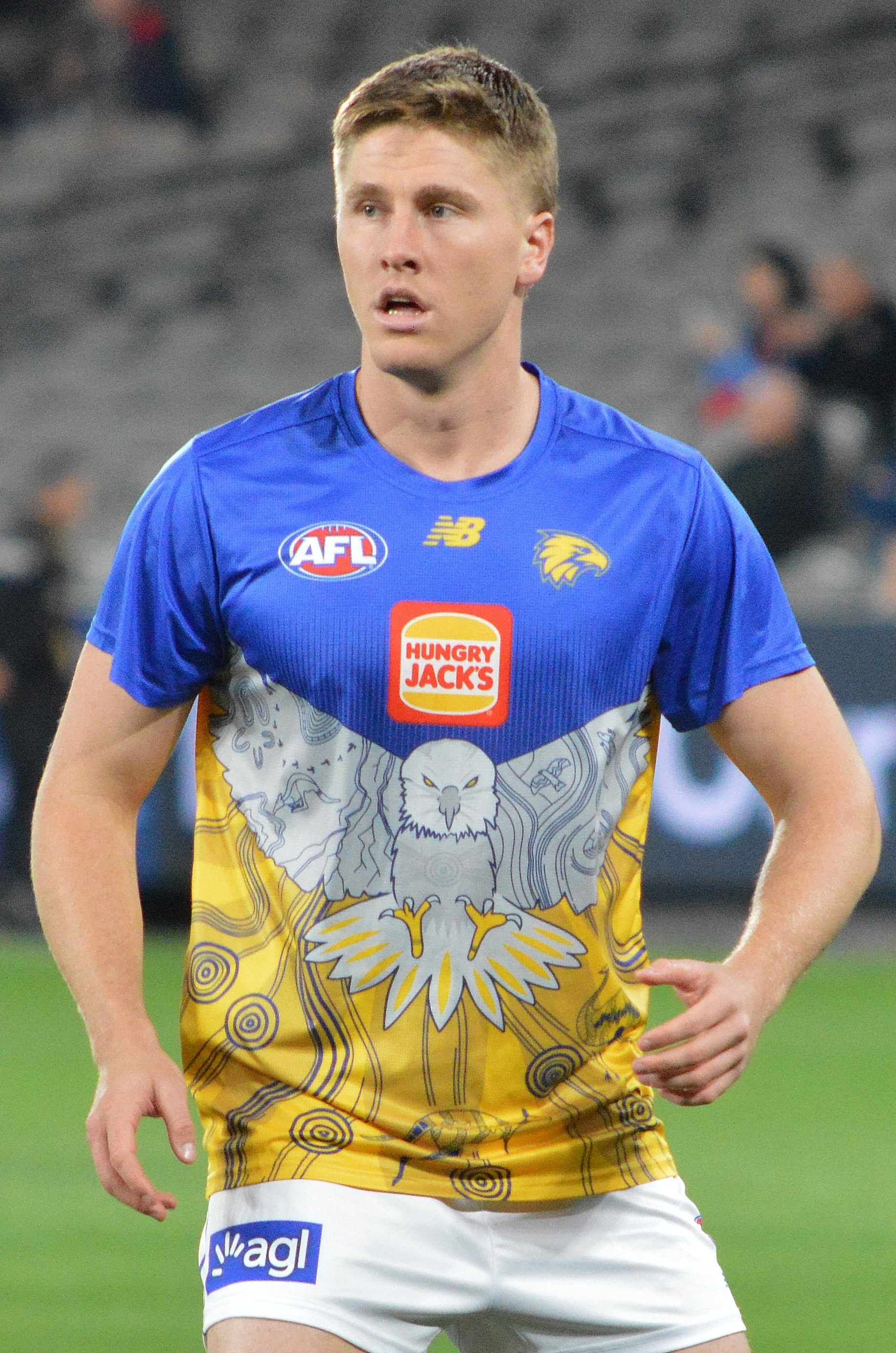
- Edwards in May 2026

Personal information
- Born: 1 October 2000 (age 26)
- Original team: Swan Districts Football Club
- Draft: No. 18, 2018 AFL rookie draft, West Coast
- Debut: 1 August 2020, West Coast vs. Geelong, at Perth Stadium
- Height: 204 cm (6 ft 8 in)
- Weight: 90 kg (198 lb)
- Position: Defender

Club information
- Current club: West Coast
- Number: 42

Playing career^{1}
Years	Club	Games (Goals)
2019–	West Coast	57 (0)
- ^{1} Playing statistics correct to the end of round 22, 2026.

Harry Edwards (born 1 October 2000) is an Australian rules footballer who plays for the West Coast Eagles in the Australian Football League (AFL). He was recruited by the West Coast with the 18th draft pick in the 2018 AFL rookie draft. Edwards was drafted as 195cm in height, measured at preseason training as 197cm, grew to 200cm in his second year and now stands 204cm tall. This followed 11cm of growth from 184cm to 195cm at 17 years of age, in his draft year.

== Early football ==
Edwards played junior football for Mazenod Junior Football Club in Western Australia. He also played for the Swan Districts Football Club in the Western Australian Football League for the 2018 season. He played fifteen games and kicked six goals, at that time playing as a ruckman and forward.

== AFL career ==
Edwards debuted in the Eagles' 9 point win against Geelong Football Club in the 9th round of the 2020 AFL season. Edwards was concussed midway through the second quarter and did not return to the ground. On debut, Edwards picked up 3 disposals. Edwards was upgraded from the rookie list at the conclusion of the season, re-signing until 2022.

== Statistics ==
Updated to the end of round 22, 2026.

Legend
G	Goals	K	Kicks	D	Disposals	T	Tackles
B	Behinds	H	Handballs	M	Marks

Season	Team	No.	Games	Totals							Averages (per game)							Votes
Season	Team	No.	Games	G	B	K	H	D	M	T	G	B	K	H	D	M	T	Votes
2019	West Coast	42	0	—	—	—	—	—	—	—	—	—	—	—	—	—	—	0
2020 (Note: The 2020 season was played with 17 home-and-away matches per team (down from 22) and 16-minute quarters with time on (down from 20-minute quarters with time on) due to the impact of the COVID-19 pandemic.)	West Coast	42	1	0	0	2	1	3	0	0	0.0	0.0	2.0	1.0	3.0	0.0	0.0	0
2021	West Coast	42	10	0	0	75	28	103	53	20	0.0	0.0	7.5	2.8	10.3	5.3	2.0	0
2022	West Coast	42	17	0	0	125	43	168	94	18	0.0	0.0	7.4	2.5	9.9	5.5	1.1	0
2023	West Coast	42	2	0	0	12	4	16	7	2	0.0	0.0	6.0	2.0	8.0	3.5	1.0	0
2024	West Coast	42	9	0	0	54	21	75	43	12	0.0	0.0	6.0	2.3	8.3	4.8	1.3	0
2025	West Coast	42	16	0	0	96	54	150	68	20	0.0	0.0	6.0	3.4	9.4	4.3	1.3	0
2026	West Coast	42	2	0	0	1	0	1	0	2	0.0	0.0	0.5	0.0	0.5	0.0	1.0	0
Career			57	0	0	365	151	516	265	74	0.0	0.0	6.4	2.6	9.1	4.6	1.3	0
