= Jarrod Cameron =

Australian rules footballer

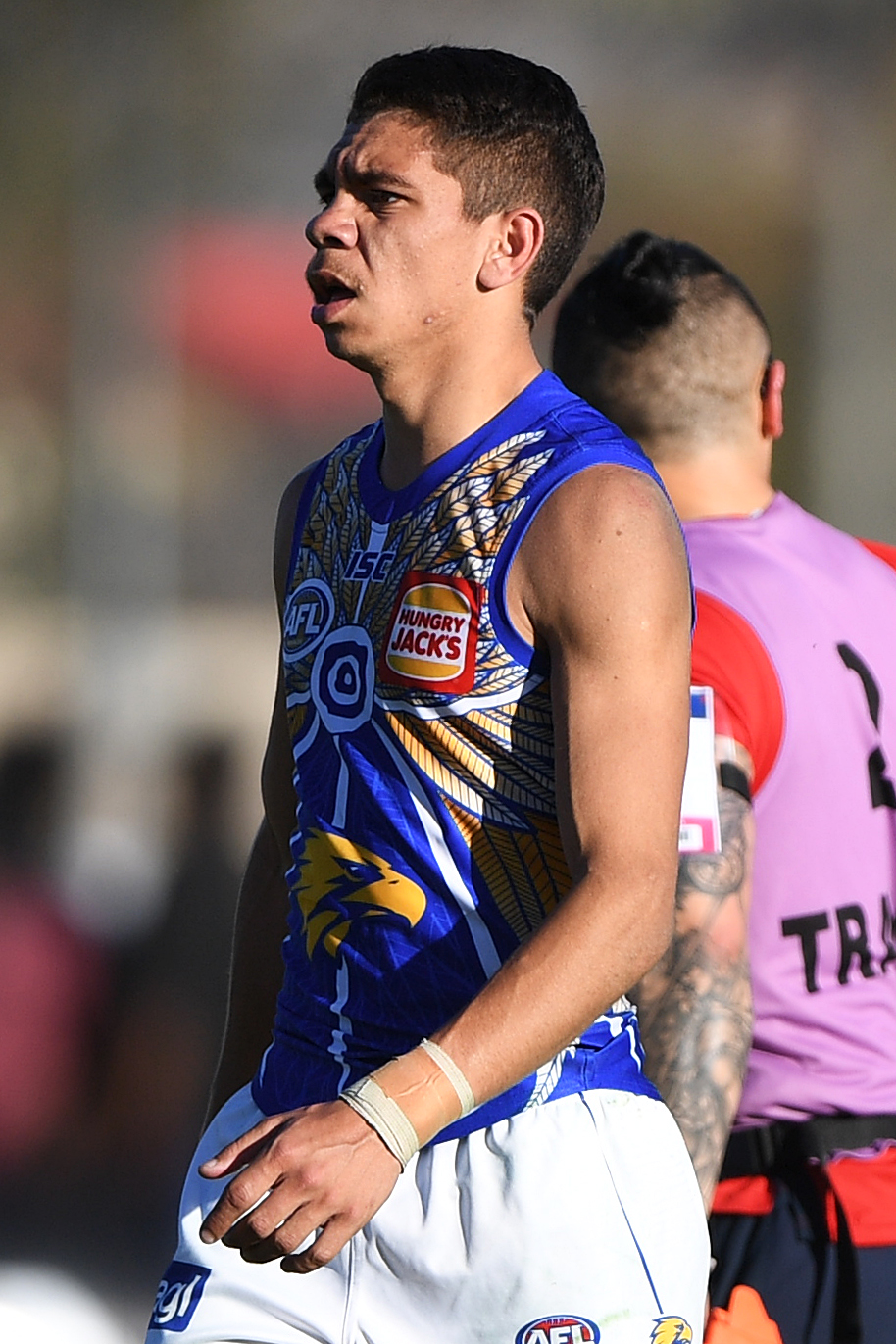
- Cameron playing for West Coast in July 2019

Personal information
- Full name: Jarrod Cameron
- Born: 3 May 2000 (age 26); Mornington Island, Queensland
- Original team: Swan Districts (WAFL)/Aquinas College, Perth (PSA)
- Height: 182 cm (6 ft 0 in)
- Weight: 70 kg (154 lb)
- Position: Small forward

Playing career^{1}
Years	Club	Games (Goals)
2019–2021	West Coast	12 (13)
- ^{1} Playing statistics correct to the end of Round 11, 2020.

Jarrod Cameron (born 3 May 2000) is a former professional Australian rules footballer playing for the West Coast Eagles in the Australian Football League (AFL).

== Early life ==
Cameron was born and raised in Mornington Island, Queensland, into a family of Indigenous Australian heritage (Lardil and Waanyi). While in Queensland, he played rugby league and cricket as a youth. At the age of 11, he relocated to Newman, Western Australia, with his family and began playing Australian rules football for the Newman Centrals Junior Football Club. His brother, Charlie, was drafted by the Adelaide Crows at the 2013 AFL draft. Due to his Pilbara residence and Indigenous background, Jarrod was Next Generation Academy draft eligible for the West Coast Eagles and was selected with the 39th pick in the 2018 AFL draft after the Eagles elected to match Brisbane's bid.

He completed school at Aquinas College, Perth, in 2017.

== AFL career ==
Cameron made his AFL debut for West Coast in their 35-point victory over Essendon in Round 14 of the 2019 AFL season.

Cameron plays as a speedy forward who can play bursts in the midfield, Cameron loves to put pressure on the opposition with his chase and tackle. He was delisted at the end of 2021 after failing to play a senior game that season.
