= Nic Naitanui =

Australian rules footballer (born 1990)

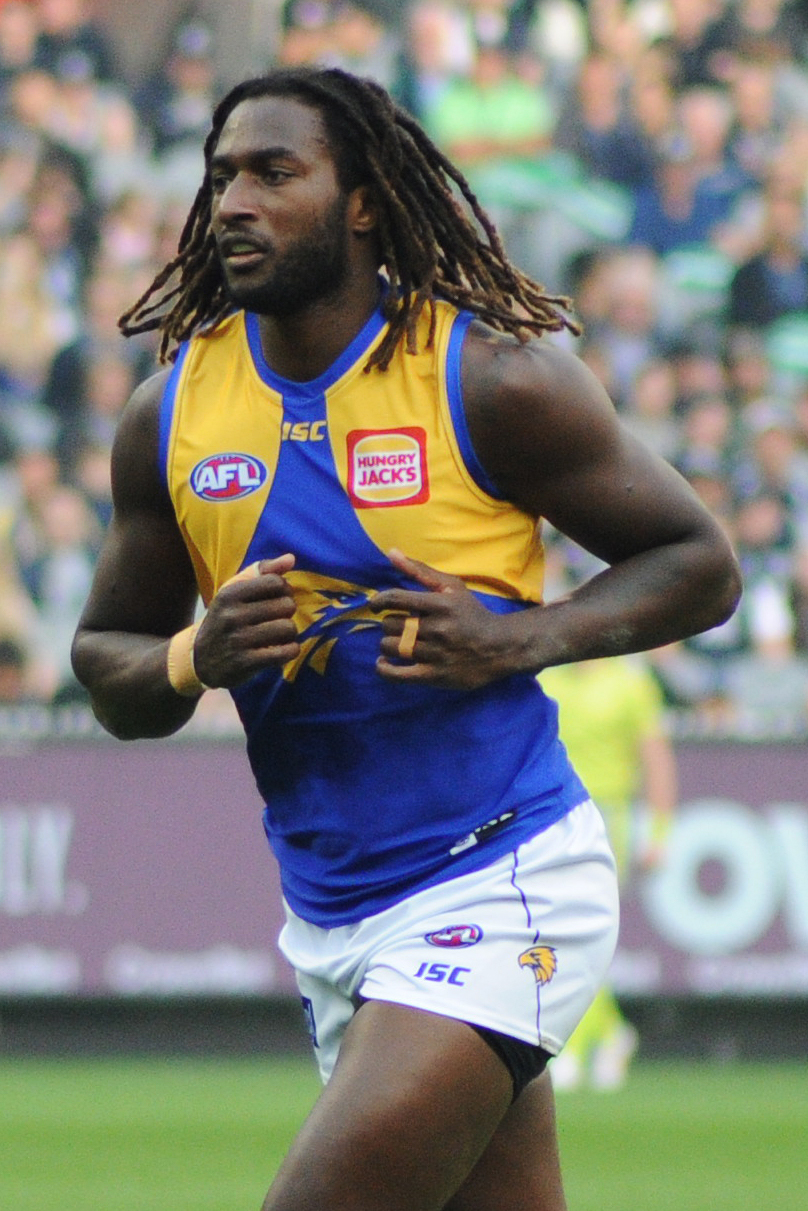
- Naitanui playing for West Coast in April 2018

Personal information
- Full name: Nicholas Naitanui
- Nickname: Nic Nat
- Born: 4 May 1990 (age 36); Penrith, New South Wales
- Original team: Swan Districts (WAFL)
- Draft: No. 2, 2008 national draft
- Height: 202 cm (6 ft 8 in)
- Weight: 111 kg (245 lb)
- Position: Ruck

Playing career^{1}
Years	Club	Games (Goals)
2008–2009	Swan Districts	23 (16)
2009–2023	West Coast	213 (112)
	→West Coast Eagles (WAFL)	2 (2)
- ^{1} Playing statistics correct to the end of 2023.

Career highlights
- 3x All-Australian team: 2012, 2020, 2021; 2x John Worsfold Medal: 2020, 2021; Mark of the Year: 2015; AFL Rising Star nominee: 2010; Western Australia Under-18: Representative 2007, 2008

Nicholas Naitanui (/ˌnæɪtəˈnuːi/; born 4 May 1990) is a former Australian rules footballer who played for the West Coast Eagles in the Australian Football League (AFL). He was born in Sydney to Fijian parents, and his family moved to Perth, Western Australia after his father's death. Growing up in Midvale, Naitanui attended Governor Stirling Senior High School, and played football for the Midvale Junior Football Club. After representing Western Australia in the 2007 and 2008 AFL Under 18 Championships, he debuted in 2008 for the Swan Districts Football Club in the West Australian Football League (WAFL). Naitanui was drafted by West Coast with the second pick in the 2008 National Draft.

Naitanui made his AFL debut for West Coast in round 12 of the 2009 season, against Richmond. He played ten games in his debut season, and received one Brownlow Medal vote for a three-goal game against Hawthorn. In his second season, Naitanui played every game, primarily as a back-up ruckman to Dean Cox, taking over the position of Mark Seaby, who was traded the previous season. Having started the season as the favourite for the AFL Rising Star, Naitanui finished 5th overall. In the 2011 season, he played 234 games, including his first finals matches, and was also nominated for Mark of the Year. He was named in the [All-Australian team] the following season, as the first-choice ruckman and was the first Fijian to ever be named in the All-Australian team.

== Early life ==
Naitanui was born to Bola and Atetha Naitanui on 4 May 1990 in Penrith, New South Wales along with his twin brother, Mark. His parents, originally from Suvavou, a small village near Suva, had emigrated to Australia from Fiji the previous year, with his two elder siblings, Georgie and Laisani, remaining in Fiji. His father died from cancer the year after Naitanui and his brother were born. After his father's death, his mother moved the family to Perth, Western Australia, where her brother lived. His mother began working at Homeswest, a public housing authority, and also volunteered at a homeless shelter. Naitanui grew up in Midvale, near Midland, and attended Midvale Primary School. He took up playing football at the age of nine, when he began playing for the Midvale Junior Football Club. As a child, he lived on Bushby Street in Midvale, along with Shane Yarran, Michael Walters and Chris Yarran, who would all go on to play AFL football. Two other AFL players, David Ellard and Jeff Garlett, also played with Naitanui, Walters, Chris Yarran and Shane Yarran at the Midvale Junior Football Club.

Naitanui attended Governor Stirling Senior High School and played football there, as well as for the Swan Districts Colts (underage) side in the West Australian Football League (WAFL). During his time in junior and colts football, he played predominantly in the ruck, however he also was used on the wing or at full-back. Naitanui also played basketball as a junior for the Perry Lakes Hawks and excelled at track and field events, particularly high jump. He was asked by recruiters to trial with American universities, but declined to do so.

In the 2007 Under-18 AFL National Championships, Naitanui was dominant in the ruck for Western Australia, and was named Best on Ground in the final. Following his performance, he was hotly pursued by several AFL clubs. However, he was born a few days too late to qualify for the 2007 AFL draft. He was named in the Under-18 All-Australian Team in both 2007 and 2008, and was awarded a scholarship with the Australian Institute of Sport to become a member of the AIS/AFL Academy Squad.

A much-hyped Naitanui was invited to the 2008 AFL Draft Camp and his results were impressive. He managed to equal the running vertical jump record previously set by Jared Brennan, but fell short of Trent Croad's standing jump record. His sprint, agility and endurance tests were also impressive.

Many media commentators believed that Naitanui was in contention to be taken as the number 1 pick in the 2008 AFL draft. The Melbourne Football Club, who retained that pick, had looked at Naitanui, but instead selected Victorian Jack Watts.

== AFL career ==
=== 2009–2015: Early career ===
Naitanui was taken at pick No. 2 overall in the 2008 AFL draft by the West Coast Eagles. As a highly rated future player by John Worsfold, Naitanui was given the number 9 guernsey, becoming the first West Coast Eagles player to wear the number since Brownlow Medalist and former captain Ben Cousins left the club at the end of the 2007 season. His first game at the senior level was on 13 June 2009 when he was named to play against Richmond in game 12 of the 2009 season.

His career suffered a setback, however, during pre-season training when he experienced knee soreness and had precautionary surgery.

Naitanui impressed enough in the WAFL in a game where he accumulated 15 possessions, 21 hit-outs, 4 goals and a spectacular mark, to earn his selection in the round 12 against Richmond at Etihad Stadium.

His debut game impressed many, demonstrating his athletic ability with another spectacular mark as well as 3 kicks, 8 handballs, 3 marks and 7 hitouts. In his second game against premiers Hawthorn at Subiaco, Naitanui was quiet for the first three-quarters but dazzled in the fourth, kicking three goals and leading his team to a come-from-behind win.

Naitanui was honoured with a nomination for the AFL Rising Star in round 4, 2010, in the West Coast Eagles win over the Essendon Bombers, a match where Naitanui dominated with 13 disposals, 5 tackles and 17 hitouts. Naitanui took out the West Coast's Rookie of the Year Award for the 2010 Season and finished fifth in the 2010 Club Champion Award.

In March 2012, a viral video of Naitanui performing a slam dunk at a Perth Wildcats basketball game received over 100,000 views on YouTube.

On 17 September 2012, Naitanui earned his first All-Australian Team nomination, being named as the starting ruckman.

On the Friday Night game against North Melbourne in round 8, 2013, Naitanui took a memorable pack mark 30 metres out with seconds left on the clock. He proceeded to kick a goal after the siren to win the game by 2 points, becoming just the 35th AFL player to do so.

Naitanui played his 100th AFL game in round 13, 2014, against the Gold Coast Suns. West Coast won by three points.

In 2015, after a strong season, Naitanui was named in the initial All-Australian squad of 40.

=== 2016–2018: ACL ruptures ===
In round 21, during the 2016 season, Naitanui kicked a goal with four seconds remaining against the GWS Giants, winning the game for the Eagles. He ruptured his ACL in the following game, and he missed the rest of the 2016 season.

Naitanui missed the entire 2017 season. Naitanui was in contention to play his first game for the season in the first semi-final against Greater Western Sydney, but he did not play.

During the 2018 season, Naitanui was suspended for a week following a tackle on Port Adelaide's Karl Amon. The decision was heavily criticised by the AFL media and past players, where it was believed he was punished for being the stronger player in the tackle.

In round 17 of the 2018 season, after 15 games back from an injury to his left anterior cruciate ligament, Naitanui landed awkwardly in a contest just before half time of the match against the Collingwood Magpies, suffering the same injury to his right anterior cruciate ligament. He was expected to miss 10–12 months of football after a reconstruction. West Coast went on to win the 2018 AFL premiership in his absence.

=== 2019 Comeback ===
After nearly a year out of the game, Naitanui returned to AFL football in round 15 against Hawthorn, after playing just one game with limited match time for the WAFL Eagles team.

=== 2020–2021 ===
Since the COVID-19 pandemic put a hold at the start of the season, Naitanui had his first full season in 4 years and received all-Australian honours as starting ruckman. On 19 October 2020, Naitanui received his first John Worsfold Medal as the club's best and fairest. Largely attributed his best and fairest win, including a public recognition via his acceptance speech at the John Worshfold Medal night, due to the work carried out on him by trainer (now property manager) Martin Davis.

At the end of 2021, he won another John Worsfold Medal. He also made the All-Australian team on the interchange.

=== Retirement ===
In August 2023, Naitanui announced his retirement from the AFL. He had not played in any games in the 2023 season and had played in just 8 games in the 2022 season.

== Personal life ==
In August 2022, Naitanui became engaged to partner Brittany Bown. In October that year, the couple welcomed their first child, a son. The couple were expecting a daughter in November 2023.

In September 2024, Naitanui became the number-one ticket holder of the Perth Wildcats.

== In the media ==
Naitanui features in the 2021 fly-on-the-wall documentary TV series Making Their Mark, which showed the impact of the COVID-19 pandemic on several AFL clubs, players, and staff. He and Eddie Betts were filmed almost continuously, with other players featured including Stephen Coniglio and Rory Sloane, along with several coaches and other staff associated with the clubs.

== Statistics ==
Statistics are correct to the end of the 2023 season

=== AFL ===
Legend
G	Goals	K	Kicks	D	Disposals	T	Tackles
B	Behinds	H	Handballs	M	Marks	H/O	Hit-outs

Season	Team	No.	Games	Totals								Averages (per game)							
Season	Team	No.	Games	G	B	K	H	D	M	T	H/O	G	B	K	H	D	M	T	H/O
2009	West Coast	9	10	3	3	15	83	98	10	39	152	0.3	0.3	1.5	8.3	9.8	1.0	3.9	15.2
2010	West Coast	9	22	9	9	94	163	257	31	74	366	0.4	0.4	4.3	7.4	11.7	1.4	3.4	16.6
2011	West Coast	9	23	18	10	120	179	299	50	88	457	0.8	0.4	5.2	7.8	13.0	2.2	3.8	19.9
2012	West Coast	9	22	24	14	116	171	287	66	75	543	1.1	0.6	5.3	7.8	13.0	3.0	3.4	24.7
2013	West Coast	9	11	8	3	56	71	127	25	39	279	0.7	0.3	5.1	6.5	11.5	2.3	3.5	25.4
2014	West Coast	9	20	9	7	85	164	249	31	77	438	0.5	0.4	4.3	8.2	12.5	1.6	3.9	21.9
2015	West Coast	9	23	17	13	132	136	268	33	82	782	0.7	0.6	5.7	6.0	11.7	1.4	3.6	34.0
2016	West Coast	9	15	8	3	81	106	187	35	42	517	0.5	0.2	5.4	7.0	12.5	2.3	2.8	34.5
2017	West Coast	9	0	—	—	—	—	—	—	—	—	—	—	—	—	—	—	—	—
2018	West Coast	9	15	6	5	82	81	163	25	64	459	0.4	0.3	5.5	5.4	10.9	1.7	4.3	30.6
2019	West Coast	9	5	0	2	37	25	62	7	17	146	0.0	0.4	7.4	5.0	12.4	1.4	3.4	29.2
2020	West Coast	9	17	5	4	109	83	192	13	40	496	0.3	0.2	6.4	4.9	11.3	0.8	2.4	29.2
2021	West Coast	9	22	3	5	154	181	335	34	65	687	0.1	0.3	7.0	8.2	15.2	1.6	3.0	31.2
2022	West Coast	9	8	2	1	43	62	105	12	19	230	0.3	0.1	5.4	7.8	13.1	1.5	2.4	28.8
2023	West Coast	9	0	—	—	—	—	—	—	—	—	—	—	—	—	—	—	—	—
Career			213	112	81	1125	1505	2630	372	722	5549	0.5	0.4	5.3	7.1	12.4	1.8	3.4	26.1

=== WAFL ===
Legend
G	Goals	K	Kicks	D	Disposals	T	Tackles
B	Behinds	H	Handballs	M	Marks	H/O	Hit-outs

Season	Team	No.	Games	Totals								Averages (per game)							
Season	Team	No.	Games	G	B	K	H	D	M	T	H/O	G	B	K	H	D	M	T	H/O
2008	Swan Districts	21, 46	17	11	3	83	120	203	36	—	279	0.6	0.2	4.9	7.1	11.9	2.1	—	16.4
2009	Swan Districts	46	6	5	4	28	47	75	9	—	122	0.8	0.7	4.7	7.8	12.5	1.5	—	20.3
2019	West Coast	9	1	0	1	4	6	10	3	4	25	0.0	1.0	4.0	6.0	10.0	3.0	4.0	25.0
2021	West Coast	9	1	2	0	9	8	17	4	2	26	2.0	0.0	9.0	8.0	17.0	4.0	2.0	26.0
Career			25	18	8	124	181	305	52	6	452	0.7	0.3	5.0	7.2	12.2	2.1	0.2	18.1
