= 2019 All-Australian team =

The 2019 Virgin Australia All-Australian team represents the best performed Australian Football League (AFL) players during the 2019 season. It was announced on 28 August as a complete Australian rules football team of 22 players. The team is honorary and does not play any games.

== Selection panel ==
The selection panel for the 2019 All-Australian team consisted of chairman Gillon McLachlan, Kevin Bartlett, Luke Darcy, Danny Frawley, Steve Hocking, Glen Jakovich, Chris Johnson, Cameron Ling, Matthew Richardson and Warren Tredrea.

== Team ==
=== Initial squad ===
The initial 40-man All-Australian squad was announced on 26 August. West Coast had the most players selected in the initial squad with seven, while minor premiers Geelong had six. Essendon, Gold Coast and St Kilda were the only clubs not to have a single player nominated in the squad.

Club	Total	Player(s)
Adelaide	1	Daniel Talia
Brisbane Lions	5	Harris Andrews, Charlie Cameron, Hugh McCluggage, Lachie Neale, Dayne Zorko
Carlton	1	Patrick Cripps
Collingwood	3	Brodie Grundy, Scott Pendlebury, Adam Treloar
Essendon	0	
Fremantle	2	Nat Fyfe, Michael Walters
Geelong	6	Gary Ablett Jr., Mark Blicavs, Patrick Dangerfield, Tom Hawkins, Tim Kelly, Tom Stewart
Gold Coast	0	
Greater Western Sydney	2	Jeremy Cameron, Nick Haynes
Hawthorn	1	James Sicily
Melbourne	1	Max Gawn
North Melbourne	2	Ben Brown, Ben Cunnington
Port Adelaide	1	Travis Boak
Richmond	4	Dylan Grimes, Bachar Houli, Dustin Martin, Dion Prestia
St Kilda	0	
Sydney	1	Dane Rampe
West Coast	7	Jack Darling, Andrew Gaff, Shannon Hurn, Jeremy McGovern, Brad Sheppard, Luke Shuey, Elliot Yeo
Western Bulldogs	3	Marcus Bontempelli, Josh Dunkley, Jack Macrae

=== Final team ===
Geelong and West Coast each had the most selections with four. Fremantle captain Nat Fyfe was announced as the All-Australian captain, with West Coast captain Shannon Hurn announced as vice-captain. The team saw nine players selected in an All-Australian team for the first time in their careers and only ten clubs were represented.

2019 All-Australian team
B:	Tom Stewart (Geelong)	Harris Andrews (Brisbane Lions)	Dylan Grimes (Richmond)
HB:	Bachar Houli (Richmond)	Jeremy McGovern (West Coast)	Shannon Hurn (West Coast) (vice-captain)
C:	Marcus Bontempelli (Western Bulldogs)	Patrick Cripps (Carlton)	Tim Kelly (Geelong)
HF:	Patrick Dangerfield (Geelong)	Jeremy Cameron (Greater Western Sydney)	Michael Walters (Fremantle)
F:	Jack Darling (West Coast)	Tom Hawkins (Geelong)	Charlie Cameron (Brisbane Lions)
Foll:	Brodie Grundy (Collingwood)	Nat Fyfe (Fremantle) (captain)	Lachie Neale (Brisbane Lions)
Int:	Scott Pendlebury (Collingwood)	Elliot Yeo (West Coast)	Max Gawn (Melbourne)
Int:	Jack Macrae (Western Bulldogs)		
Coach:	Damien Hardwick (Richmond)		

Note: the position of coach in the All-Australian team is traditionally awarded to the coach of the premiership team.
