= 2017 All-Australian team =

Australian Football Team

The 2017 Virgin Australia All-Australian team represents the best performed Australian Football League (AFL) players during the 2017 season. It was announced on 30 August as a complete Australian rules football team of 22 players. The team is honorary and does not play any games.

== Selection panel ==
The selection panel for the 2017 All-Australian team consisted of chairman Gillon McLachlan, Kevin Bartlett, Luke Darcy, Andrew Dillon, Danny Frawley, Glen Jakovich, Chris Johnson, Cameron Ling, Matthew Richardson and Warren Tredrea.

== Team ==
=== Initial squad ===
The initial 40-man All-Australian squad was announced on 28 August. Minor premiers Adelaide had the most selections with eight, while Fremantle and Gold Coast were the only clubs not to have a single player nominated in the squad.

Club	Total	Player(s)
Adelaide	8	Eddie Betts, Matt Crouch, Sam Jacobs, Rory Laird, Jake Lever, Tom Lynch, Rory Sloane, Taylor Walker
Brisbane Lions	1	Dayne Zorko
Carlton	2	Sam Docherty, Matthew Kreuzer
Collingwood	2	Jeremy Howe, Adam Treloar
Essendon	3	Joe Daniher, Michael Hurley, Zach Merrett
Fremantle	0	
Geelong	2	Patrick Dangerfield, Joel Selwood
Gold Coast	0	
Greater Western Sydney	4	Toby Greene, Josh Kelly, Tom Scully, Dylan Shiel
Hawthorn	1	Tom Mitchell
Melbourne	3	Jeff Garlett, Michael Hibberd, Neville Jetta
North Melbourne	1	Ben Brown
Port Adelaide	2	Robbie Gray, Tom Jonas, Paddy Ryder
Richmond	2	Dustin Martin, Alex Rance
St Kilda	2	Dylan Roberton, Sebastian Ross
Sydney	2	Lance Franklin, Josh Kennedy
West Coast	3	Josh Kennedy, Jeremy McGovern, Elliot Yeo
Western Bulldogs	1	Marcus Bontempelli

=== Final team ===
Adelaide, Essendon and West Coast each had the most selections with three. Richmond defender Alex Rance was announced as the All-Australian captain, with West Coast forward Josh Kennedy announced as vice-captain. The team saw twelve players selected in an All-Australian team for the first time in their careers, with twelve clubs represented.

2017 All-Australian team
B:	Michael Hibberd (Melbourne)	Alex Rance (Richmond) (captain)	Jeremy McGovern (West Coast)
HB:	Rory Laird (Adelaide)	Michael Hurley (Essendon)	Sam Docherty (Carlton)
C:	Josh Kelly (Greater Western Sydney)	Dustin Martin (Richmond)	Zach Merrett (Essendon)
HF:	Robbie Gray (Port Adelaide)	Lance Franklin (Sydney)	Dayne Zorko (Brisbane Lions)
F:	Joe Daniher (Essendon)	Josh Kennedy (West Coast) (vice-captain)	Eddie Betts (Adelaide)
Foll:	Paddy Ryder (Port Adelaide)	Patrick Dangerfield (Geelong)	Tom Mitchell (Hawthorn)
Int:	Matt Crouch (Adelaide)	Elliot Yeo (West Coast)	Joel Selwood (Geelong)
Int:	Dylan Shiel (Greater Western Sydney)		
Coach:	Damien Hardwick (Richmond)		

Note: the position of coach in the All-Australian team is traditionally awarded to the coach of the premiership team.
