= Elliot Yeo =

Australian rules footballer

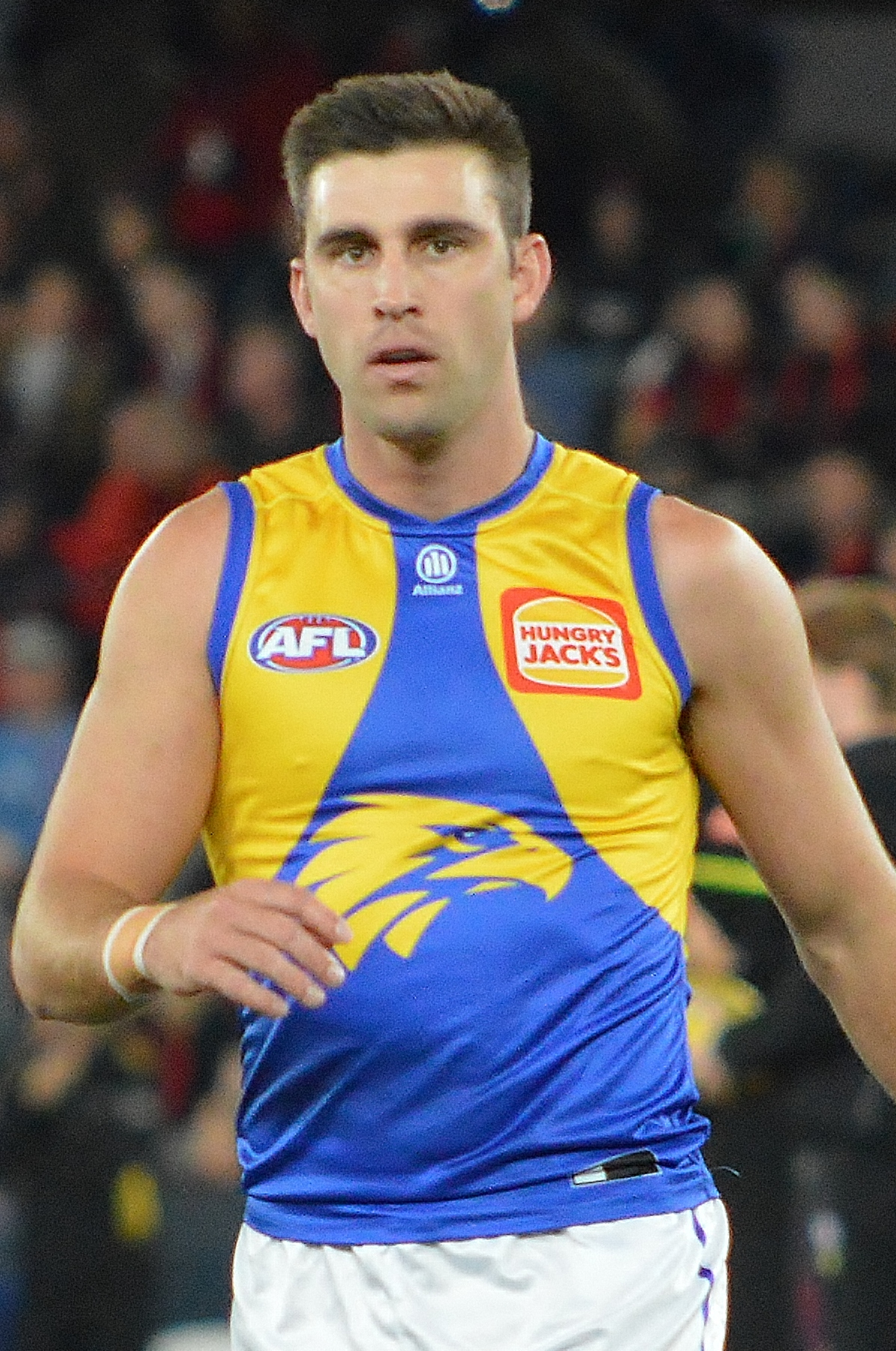
- Yeo playing for West Coast in 2026

Personal information
- Full name: Elliot Yeo
- Born: 1 October 1993 (age 33); Perth, Western Australia
- Original team: East Fremantle (WAFL)
- Draft: No. 30, 2011 national draft
- Debut: Round 9, 2012, Brisbane Lions vs. North Melbourne, at Etihad Stadium
- Height: 190 cm (6 ft 3 in)
- Weight: 89 kg (196 lb)
- Position: Midfielder / defender

Club information
- Current club: West Coast
- Number: 6

Playing career^{1}
Years	Club	Games (Goals)
2012–2013	Brisbane Lions	27 (1)
2014–	West Coast	204 (97)
Total		229 (97)

Representative team honours^{2}
Years	Team	Games (Goals)
2020	All Stars	1 (0)
- ^{1} Playing statistics correct to the end of round 22, 2026.^{2} Representative statistics correct as of 2020.

Career highlights
- AFL premiership player: 2018; 2× All-Australian team: 2017, 2019; 2× John Worsfold Medal: 2017, 2018; 2× Glendinning–Allan Medal: 2018 (game 2), 2024 (game 1)

Elliot Yeo (born 1 October 1993) is a professional Australian rules footballer playing for the West Coast Eagles in the Australian Football League (AFL). He previously played for the Brisbane Lions between 2012 and 2013. Yeo won a premiership with West Coast in 2018, and is a dual All-Australian, dual John Worsfold Medallist and dual Glendinning–Allan Medallist.

== Early life ==
Yeo was born in Perth to Craig and Wendy Yeo, and attended high school at Aquinas College. He has an older brother, Corey, who currently plays for Perth in the West Australian Football League (WAFL). The family surname is Cornish and is pronounced "YO". Beginning his career at the Booragoon Junior Football Club, Yeo represented Western Australia at the 2011 AFL Under 18 Championships (where his teammates included Jaeger O'Meara and Stephen Coniglio), and also played 14 games at colts level for East Fremantle in the WAFL.

== AFL career ==
=== Brisbane Lions (2012–2013) ===
Yeo was drafted by the Brisbane Lions with the 30th pick overall in the 2011 AFL draft. He made his AFL debut in round nine of the 2012 season, against North Melbourne at Etihad Stadium. Despite recording 16 disposals, he was omitted for the next game and did not return until round 16, after which he played seven out of Brisbane's last eight matches. Yeo had a promising second season in 2013, playing 19 games and averaging 14.5 disposals and four marks. However, at the end of the season he requested to be traded back to a team in his home state. The West Coast Eagles were always the leading contender for Yeo's services, and eventually finalised a deal with the Lions in which he would join the Eagles in return for a second-round draft pick (pick 28). Yeo played 27 games in total for Brisbane, kicking one goal.

=== West Coast (2014–present) ===
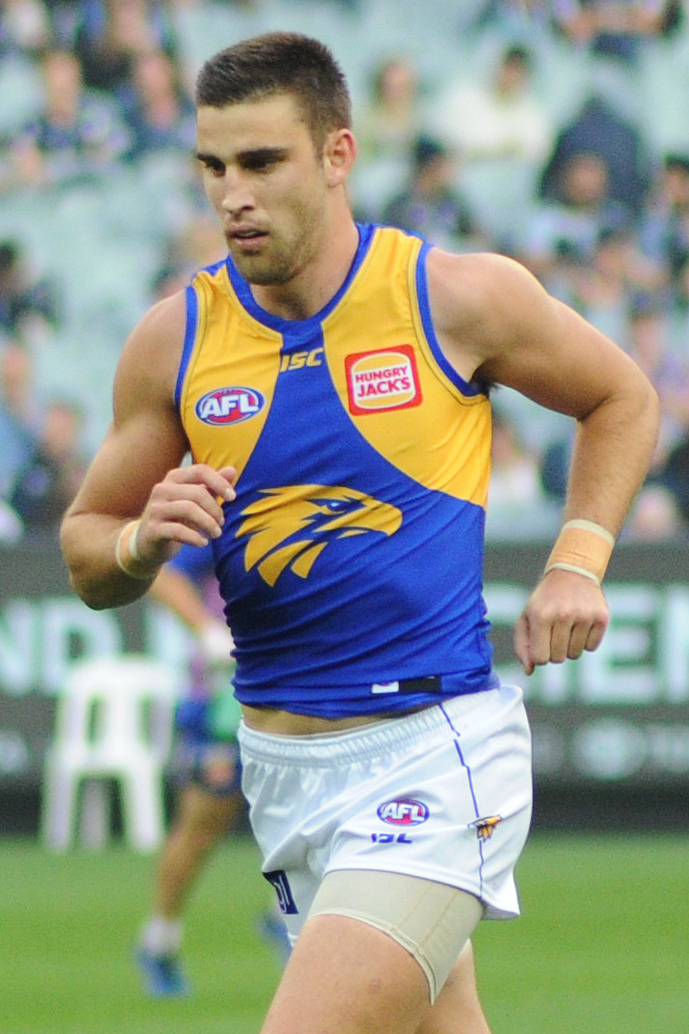
Yeo playing for West Coast in 2018

On 24 October 2013, Yeo was officially traded to the Eagles. He received the #6 guernsey, which had been vacated by the retiring Mark Nicoski. Yeo played his first game for the Eagles in round one of the 2014 season against the Western Bulldogs. In a bizarre incident in round 10, 2014, he collided with the shoulder of Collingwood defender Jarrod Witts, causing his two front teeth to snap off. Yeo later broke his hand in round 13 against the Gold Coast, due to which he missed nine weeks of the season and did not return until round 23. He reinjured the hand in preseason training in November 2014, requiring additional surgery.

Yeo had a breakout season in 2015, playing all but one of his team's 25 games (including the grand final loss to Hawthorn). He missed round nine after being suspended for making high contact on St Kilda's Jimmy Webster. Yeo kicked 18 goals for the season, including four in one game against Gold Coast (along with 29 possessions and nine marks). He was awarded one Brownlow Medal vote for that game and five in total, which were the first of his career.

In 2016, Yeo showed flashes of brilliance but was criticised for inconsistency. He had a blistering start to the 2017 season in a new role across the half-back flank. He led the AFLCA voting at one point, and surged into contention for the Brownlow Medal, with the TAB slashing his odds from $201 to $34 by round seven. Yeo recorded 32 disposals in the round six Western Derby against Fremantle (his first time past the 30-disposal mark), and in the first eight rounds recorded 10 or more marks in five games. Yeo was selected in the 2017 All-Australian team on the interchange bench.

In 2018, Yeo began the year as a utility, shifting between the midfield and halfback for the first three games. However, in round 3 against Geelong, he was moved to the middle at half time to stop a Cats comeback - this proved dramatically successful, and he became a permanent fixture in West Coast's midfield. In round 20, he won his first Glendinning–Allan Medal as best afield in the Western Derby. Yeo played his 100th game for West Coast the following week, amassing 25 disposals and a goal in West Coast's come-from-behind four-point win against Port Adelaide. He was part of the West Coast team that won the premiership that year, defeating Collingwood by five points, and finished the year with a second consecutive John Worsfold Medal.

Yeo carried his 2018 form into the next season, finishing up in the 2019 All-Australian team on the bench.

In August 2020, after playing in the first ten matches of the season, Yeo was a late withdrawal from the round 12 match against Hawthorn with what was believed to be osteitis pubis. The following month, he was ruled out for the rest of the season with the injury. On the 15th Match 2026 he played his first game in 568 Days with a loss vs Gold Coast Suns which he played well in

== Statistics ==
Updated to the end of round 22, 2026.

Legend
G	Goals	K	Kicks	D	Disposals	T	Tackles
B	Behinds	H	Handballs	M	Marks
#	Played in that season's premiership team	†	Led the league for the season

Season	Team	No.	Games	Totals							Averages (per game)							Votes
Season	Team	No.	Games	G	B	K	H	D	M	T	G	B	K	H	D	M	T	Votes
2012	Brisbane Lions	26	8	0	1	61	58	119	28	9	0.0	0.1	7.6	7.3	14.9	3.5	1.1	0
2013	Brisbane Lions	26	19	1	2	159	116	275	81	43	0.1	0.1	8.4	6.1	14.5	4.3	2.3	0
2014	West Coast	6	13	2	3	110	84	194	54	44	0.2	0.2	8.5	6.5	14.9	4.2	3.4	0
2015	West Coast	6	24	18	10	229	181	410	120	82	0.8	0.4	9.5	7.5	17.1	5.0	3.4	5
2016	West Coast	6	20	16	17	207	126	333	83	99	0.8	0.9	10.4	6.3	16.7	4.2	5.0	3
2017	West Coast	6	23	8	7	345	187	532	161	77	0.3	0.3	15.0	8.1	23.1	7.0	3.3	4
2018^{#}	West Coast	6	25	14	15	390	225	615	129	167	0.6	0.6	15.6	9.0	24.6	5.2	6.7	15
2019	West Coast	6	23	11	12	323	223	546	84	168	0.5	0.5	14.0	9.7	23.7	3.7	7.3	17
2020 (Note: The 2020 season was played with 17 home-and-away matches per team (down from 22) and 16-minute quarters with time on (down from 20-minute quarters with time on) due to the impact of the COVID-19 pandemic.)	West Coast	6	10	0	1	107	85	192	22	56	0.0	0.1	10.7	8.5	19.2	2.2	5.6	8
2021	West Coast	6	12	3	7	150	114	264	27	63	0.3	0.6	12.5	9.5	22.0	2.3	5.3	4
2022	West Coast	6	5	0	1	50	25	75	21	8	0.0	0.2	10.0	5.0	15.0	4.2	1.6	0
2023	West Coast	6	10	1	0	115	59	174	34	34	0.1	0.0	11.5	5.9	17.4	3.4	3.4	0
2024	West Coast	6	20	11	10	245	205	450	39	129	0.6	0.5	12.3	10.3	22.5	2.0	6.5	8
2025	West Coast	6	0	—	—	—	—	—	—	—	—	—	—	—	—	—	—	0
2026	West Coast	6	19	13	11	172	135	307	49	100	0.7	0.6	9.1	7.1	16.2	2.6	5.3	0
Career			231	98	97	2663	1823	4486	932	1079	0.4	0.4	11.5	7.9	19.4	4.0	4.7	64

== Honours and achievements ==
Team

- AFL premiership player (West Coast): 2018
- NAB Cup: (Brisbane Lions) 2013

Individual

- 2× All-Australian team: 2017, 2019
- 2× John Worsfold Medal: 2017, 2018
- All Stars representative honours in State of Origin for Bushfire Relief Match
- Glendinning–Allan Medal: 2018 (game 2)
- 22under22 team: 2015
