= Chad Morrison =

Australian rules footballer (born 1978)

Personal information
- Born: 29 March 1978 (age 48); Melbourne, Victoria
- Original team: Southern U18
- Debut: Round 1, 31 March 1996, West Coast Eagles vs. Fremantle, at Subiaco Oval
- Height: 184 cm (6 ft 0 in)
- Weight: 86 kg (190 lb)

Playing career^{1}
Years	Club	Games (Goals)
1996–2004	West Coast	148 (87)
2005–2006	Collingwood	21 (1)
Total		169 (88)
- ^{1} Playing statistics correct to the end of 2006.

Career highlights
- AFL Rising Star nominee: 1996

Chad Morrison (born 29 March 1978) is a former Australian rules footballer in the Australian Football League.

Drafted to the West Coast Eagles as a compensatory pick in the 1995 Pre-Season Draft, Morrison made his debut as an eighteen-year-old in Round 1 against Fremantle in 1996, after staying in Melbourne to finish year 12 studies in 1995. Dropped twice after two games, he continued to force his way back into the side and with great late form, the half-back/half-forward flanker picked up an AFL Rising Star nomination. In 1997 he showed what he was capable of, having a solid and relatively consistent year, coming third in the Club Champion Award, including a good finals series. He continued to find the ball consistently throughout his career, playing mostly as a sweeper who occasionally ran forward and kicked a goal, including a bag of four goals against the Western Bulldogs in 1998.

In 2000 he was just outstanding, finding the ball at half-back as a ball magnet. He played all 22 games, and on 14 occasions he had 20 or more disposals, including 30 or more on three occasions, preferably late in the season. He averaged 23 disposals for the season, and once again came 3rd in the best and fairest. In 2001 he played most of the first half before injuring his knee, requiring a knee-reconstruction, and once again in 2002 he did the same thing, requiring a second reconstruction, ruling him out for the whole season, and almost 20 months of league footy, before he regained his skill, to yet again be injured, and only play 10 games, and his future in doubt. His next season saw him play 18 games, but he was not as dominant, as expected. He did however have a great final month and a half finding the ball. A Victorian representative earlier in his career, he was traded to Collingwood in a draft pick deal.

At the Pies he managed 21 games in two seasons, with injury curtailing any opportunity of Morrison finding the same form that he had at the Eagles earlier in his career.

== Retirement ==
Morrison retired after playing only 6 matches in 2006, but cited knee and back problems as the reason for his retirement.

Chad Morrison returned to his adopted home Perth in 2007 to play for the Swan Districts in the WAFL and to coach the club's colts team. Winning a premiership as coach in 2007 with the likes of Nic Naitanui, Michael Walters and Jeff Garlett in the side. In 2008 and 2009 Morrison coached the East Fremantle Colts, but was starved of success at the Sharks with the likes of young up and coming players like David Swallow being unavailable for colts and playing league for a majority of the season. He finished up at the end of this season citing business opportunities as a major reason.

Since 2010 Morrison has run a personal training business in Perth area called Chad Morrison Fitness and a women's football academy. He has also returned to the West Coast Eagles where he coordinates the regional academies and women's football.
