= Dylan Shiel =

Australian rules footballer

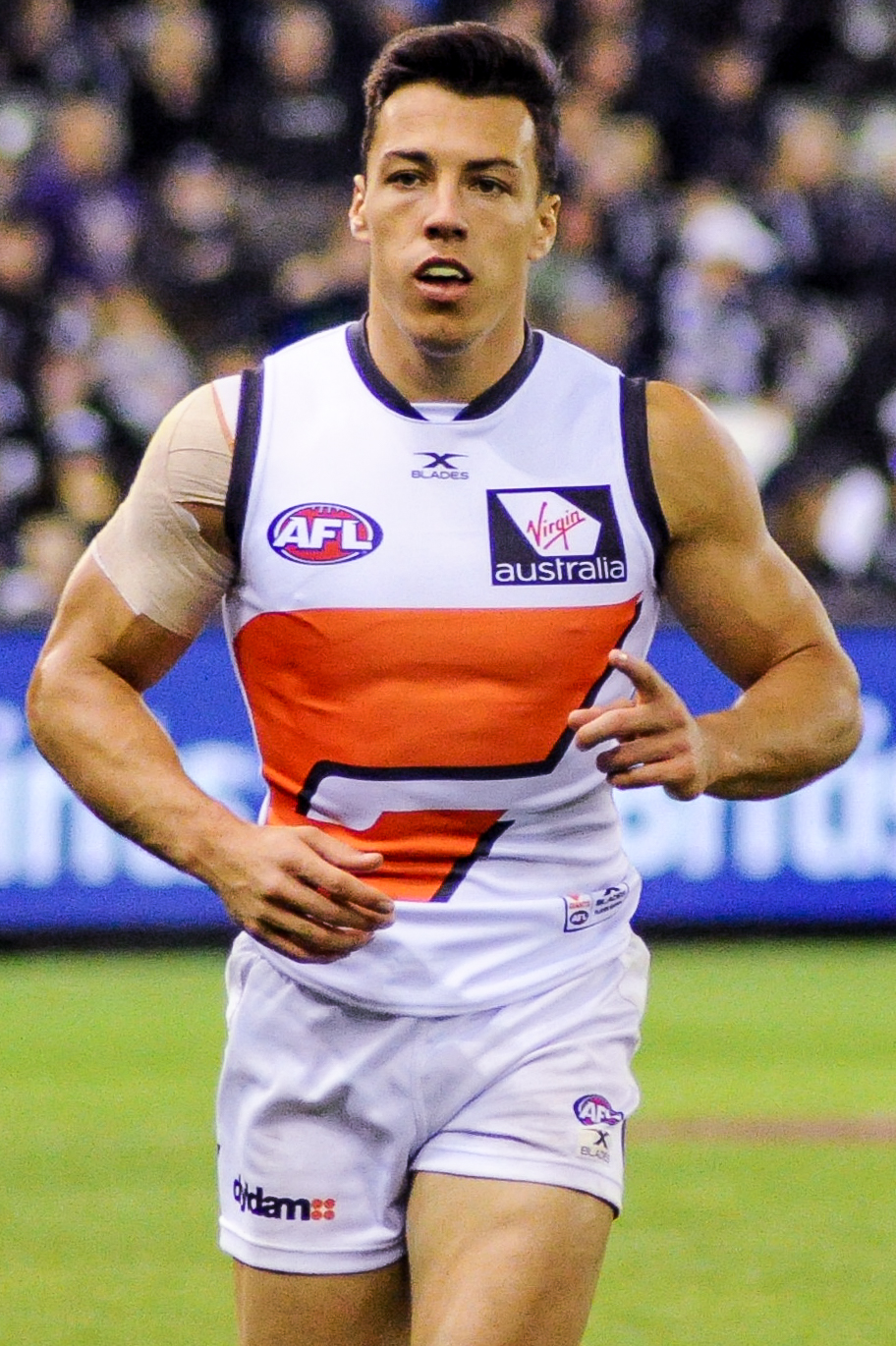
- Shiel playing in June 2017.

Personal information
- Full name: Dylan Anthony Shiel
- Born: 9 March 1993 (age 33)
- Original team: Dandenong Stingrays (TAC Cup)
- Draft: GWS Underage Selection
- Height: 182 cm (6 ft 0 in)
- Weight: 90 kg (198 lb)
- Position: Midfielder

Playing career
Years	Club	Games (Goals)
2012–2018	Greater Western Sydney	135 (64)
2019–2025	Essendon	99 (29)
Total		234 (93)

Career highlights
- All-Australian team: 2017; 22under22 team: 2015; 2012 AFL Rising Star: nominee

Dylan Anthony Shiel (born 9 March 1993) is a former professional Australian rules footballer who played for Greater Western Sydney and Essendon in the Australian Football League (AFL).

== Early life ==
Shiel attended Caulfield Grammar School, graduating in 2010, prior he attended St Bede's College in Mentone, Victoria. He was originally a Carlton supporter. Growing up he played junior football for local club Edithvale-Aspendale Football Club.

He played seven games for the Dandenong Stingrays in the 2010 TAC Cup, averaging 30 disposals, kicking six goals and leading the league in contested possessions with 13 per match. At the end of this season he was signed by GWS Giants as underage selection. He spent 2011 playing for the Giants in the NEAFL one year prior to their AFL entry.

== Greater Western Sydney ==
Shiel was one of 12 underage recruits that GWS had access to as part of their list concessions when entering the league, and played in the club's inaugural match in 2012 against the Sydney Swans.

Shiel played 135 games at Greater Western Sydney in seven seasons, playing mostly as one of the key midfielders in the side. He achieved All-Australian selection in the 2017 season. At the conclusion of the 2018 AFL Season, Shiel was traded to Essendon.

== Essendon ==
Following a salary cap issue at the GWS Giants, Shiel was encouraged to explore his options elsewhere and with the intention to continue his football in Victoria in the coming years, he decided to entertain the idea. He met with four clubs: St Kilda, Hawthorn, Carlton and Essendon and decided with the latter, Carlton explored extreme methods in trying to lure Dylan, flying the midfield star to Noosa on a private jet as part of a bold pitch to snare his signature. It is believed he turned down more than $3 million to sign with Essendon as he was chasing success over money and was put off by Carlton’s luxurious pitch which included caviar and an entourage of Carlton power brokers, including Chris Judd. The trade was done in the dying minutes of the 2018 Trade Period with Essendon sending Pick 9 and their 2019 first-round pick to GWS, and GWS' 2019 second-round pick being sent back to Essendon along with Shiel.

Shiel commenced his first pre-season at Essendon in November 2018 with the expectation of slotting straight into the starting midfield in his first game for the club against his old side on March 24th 2019.

After a full preseason, Shiel played 4 games adjusting to playing in the Essendon midfield until playing his "breakout game" at his new club in Round 5 against North Melbourne. Regarded by many as best afield, Shiel recorded an astonishing 866 metres gained together with his 10 inside 50s and 4 goal assists. In the 2019 season Shiel came second in the Essendon Football Club Best and Fairest.

Shiel battled with form and injuries over the rest of his time at Essendon, including being omitted from the team at times throughout 2024 and 2025. At the end of the 2025 season, Shiel and Essendon agreed to mutually part ways after 99 matches across 7 seasons. Shiel expressed an openness to continue his career at a third club if there was any interest, but also a willingness to embrace retirement if not.

== See also ==
- List of Caulfield Grammar School people

== Statistics ==
Legend
G	Goals	K	Kicks	D	Disposals	T	Tackles
B	Behinds	H	Handballs	M	Marks

Season	Team	No.	Games	Totals							Averages (per game)							Votes
Season	Team	No.	Games	G	B	K	H	D	M	T	G	B	K	H	D	M	T	Votes
2012	Greater Western Sydney	5	12	5	4	108	120	228	39	46	0.4	0.3	9.0	10.0	19.0	3.3	3.8	0
2013	Greater Western Sydney	5	21	11	11	194	217	411	62	70	0.5	0.5	9.2	10.3	19.6	3.0	3.3	1
2014	Greater Western Sydney	5	17	9	11	186	207	393	65	82	0.5	0.6	10.9	12.2	23.1	3.8	4.8	1
2015	Greater Western Sydney	5	14	8	9	164	202	366	38	55	0.6	0.6	11.7	14.4	26.1	2.7	3.9	6
2016	Greater Western Sydney	5	23	13	15	319	320	639	82	84	0.6	0.7	13.9	13.9	27.8	3.6	3.7	7
2017	Greater Western Sydney	5	25	12	15	329	327	656	65	92	0.5	0.6	13.2	13.1	26.2	2.6	3.7	11
2018	Greater Western Sydney	5	23	6	14	321	274	595	66	79	0.3	0.6	14.0	11.9	25.9	2.9	3.4	10
2019	Essendon	9	22	9	15	311	265	576	68	108	0.4	0.7	14.1	12.0	26.2	3.1	4.9	14
2020 (Note: The 2020 season was played with 17 home-and-away matches per team (down from 22) and 16-minute quarters with time on (down from 20-minute quarters with time on) due to the impact of the COVID-19 pandemic.)	Essendon	9	15	4	6	189	159	348	38	52	0.3	0.4	12.6	10.6	23.2	2.5	3.5	6
2021	Essendon	9	8	3	4	74	81	155	16	24	0.4	0.5	9.3	10.1	19.4	2.0	3.0	0
2022	Essendon	9	19	3	4	189	247	436	62	86	0.2	0.2	9.9	13.0	22.9	3.3	4.5	4
2023	Essendon	9	12	6	1	105	119	224	32	38	0.5	0.1	8.8	9.9	18.7	2.7	3.2	0
2024	Essendon	9	9	2	0	94	95	189	34	31	0.2	0.0	10.4	10.6	21.0	3.8	3.4	0
2025	Essendon	9	14	2	2	141	155	296	53	40	0.1	0.1	10.1	11.1	21.1	3.8	2.9	3
Career			234	93	111	2724	2788	5512	720	887	0.4	0.5	11.6	11.9	23.6	3.1	3.8	63
