= John Worsfold Medal =

Australian rules football award

The John Worsfold Medal is an Australian rules football award presented annually to the player(s) adjudged the best and fairest at the West Coast Eagles throughout the Victorian Football League/Australian Football League (VFL/AFL) season.

Sixteen individual players have won the West Coast best and fairest since the award was introduced for West Coast's inaugural 1987 season. The record of the most Club Champion Awards by an individual player is four which is held by Glen Jakovich and Ben Cousins. Both players also share the record for the most consecutive best and fairests, having both won three consecutive awards.

The Club Champion Award was renamed the John Worsfold Medal in 2013, after former premiership-winning captain and coach John Worsfold.

== Voting procedure ==
Various procedures have been used by the match committee to determine the club champion:

- 1987: unknown
- 1988: unknown
- 1989–2001: The match committee collectively award three votes to the best player, two votes to the second-best player and one vote to the third-best player in each match.
- 2002–04: Each member of the match committee rates every player to a maximum of five votes for each match.
- 2005–13: Each member of the match committee rates every player on a 5–4–3–2–1 basis for each match.
- 2014–present: Each member of the match committee rates every player to a maximum of three votes for each match.

== Recipients ==
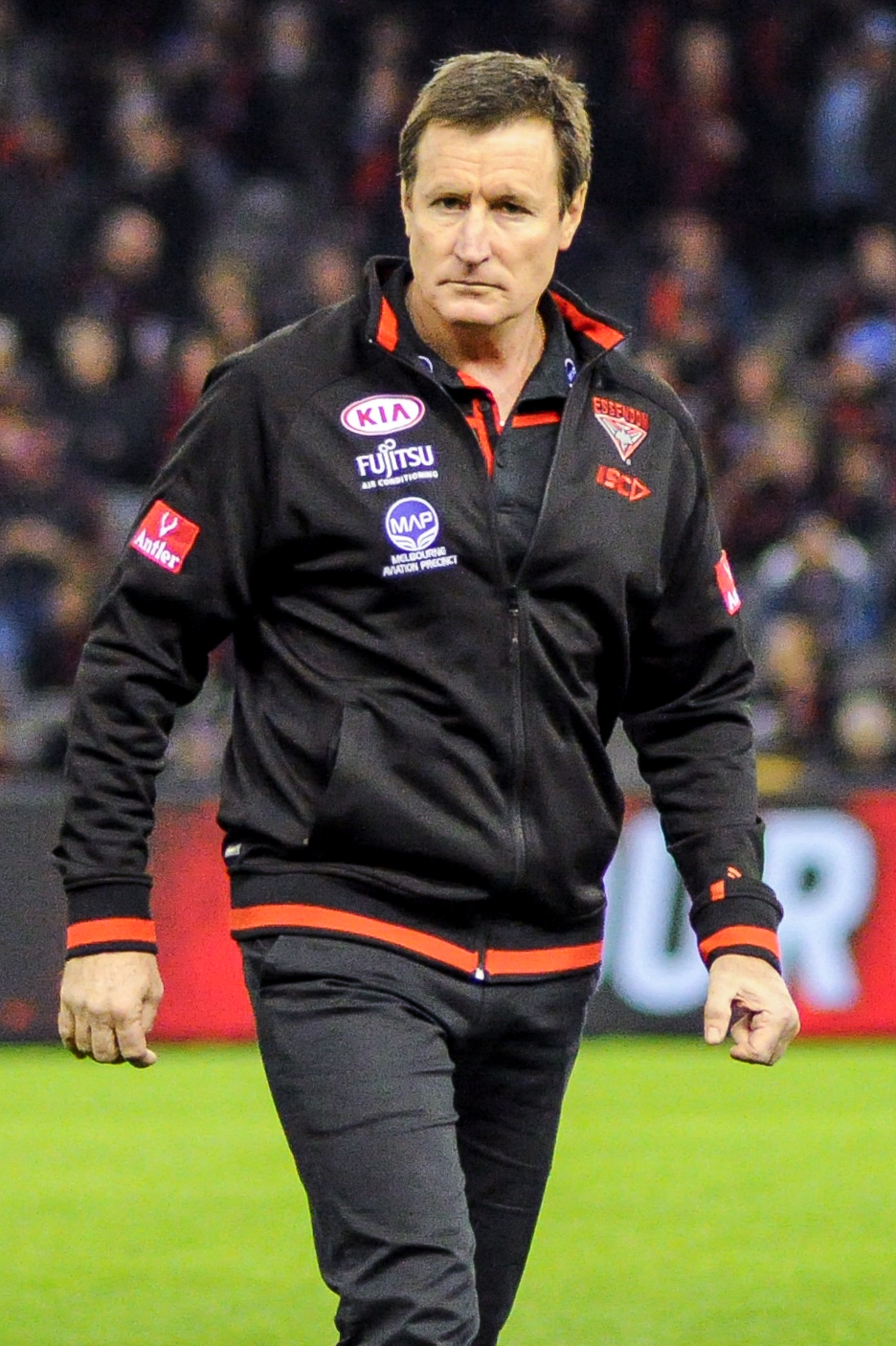
John Worsfold, the namesake of the award, won in 1988.

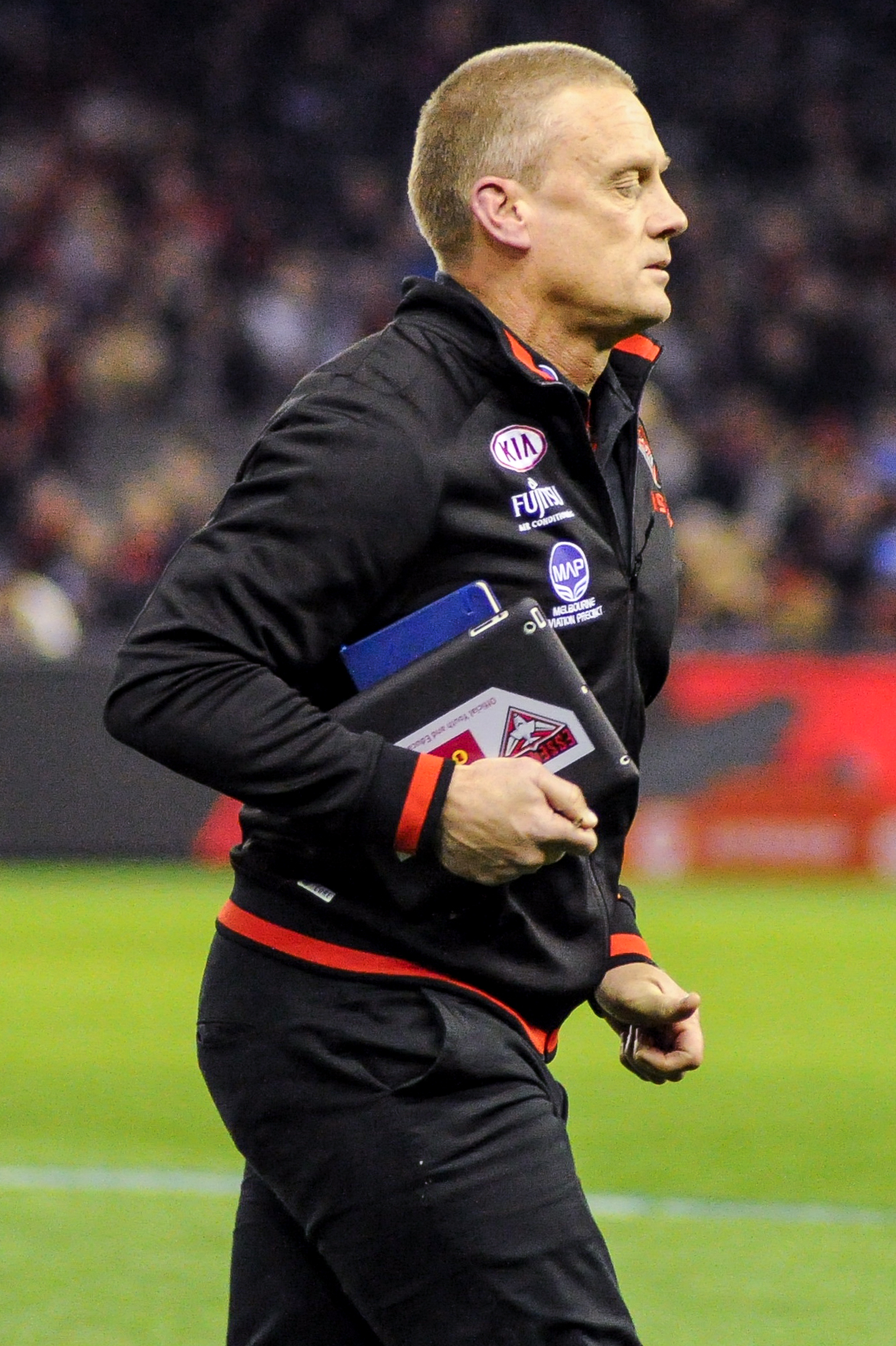
Guy McKenna won in 1989 and 1999.

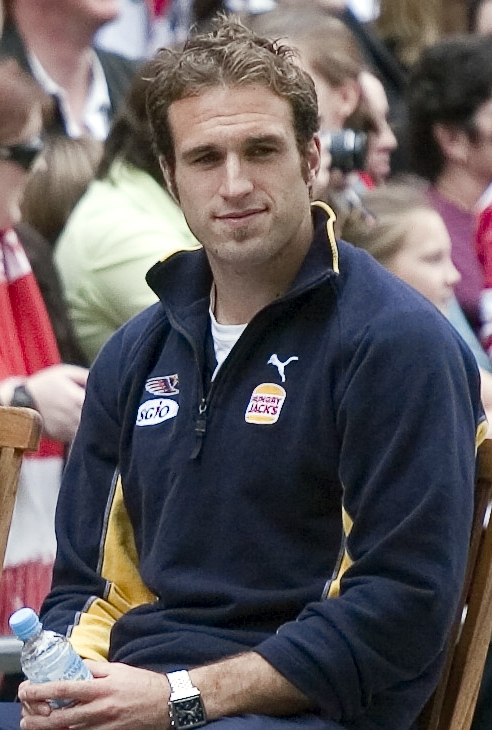
Chris Judd won the 2004 Brownlow Medal in the same year he won the John Worsfold Medal.

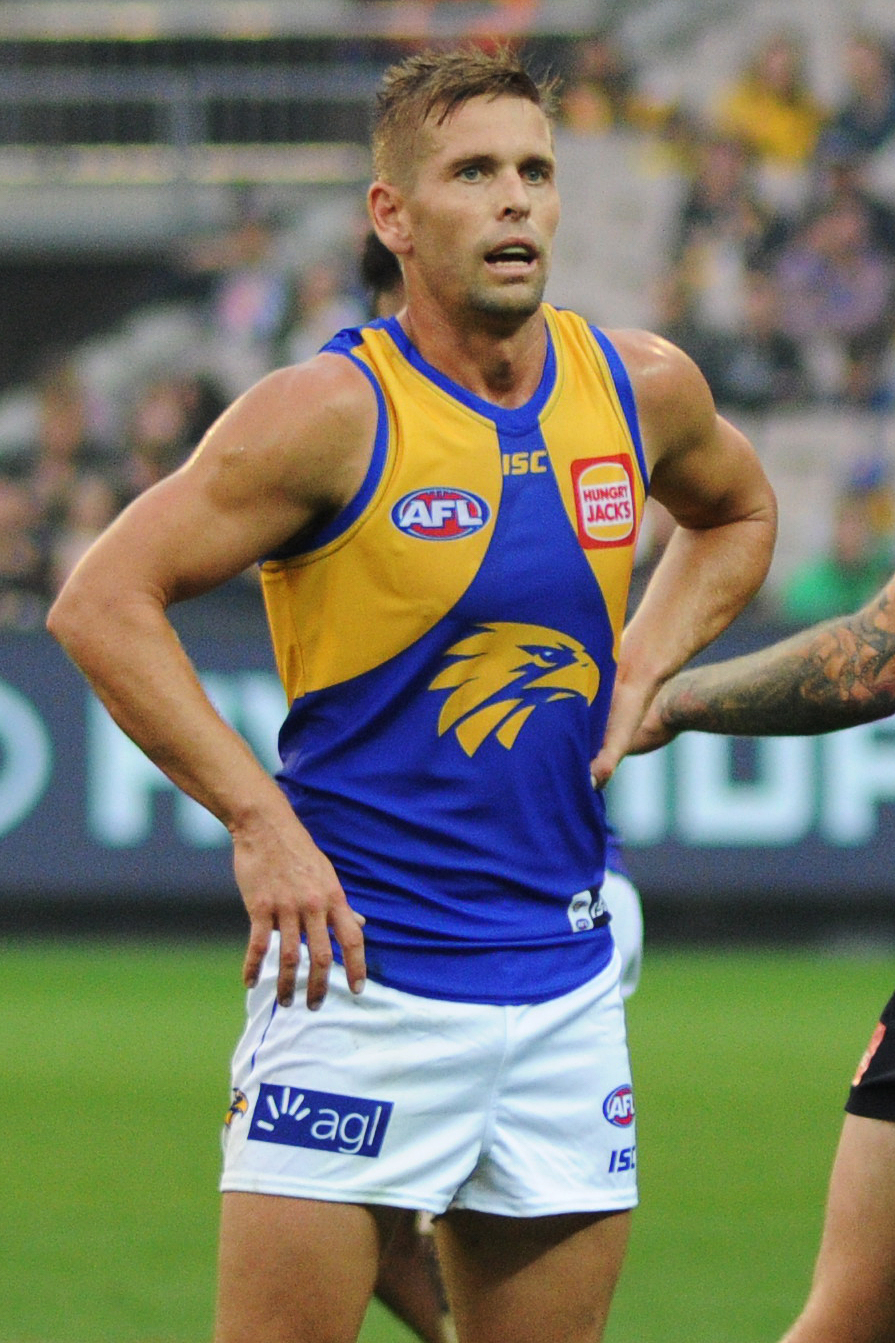
Mark LeCras won in 2010.

^	Denotes current player
+	Won Brownlow in that same year

Year	Winner(s)	Votes	Runner(s) up	Votes	Third place	Votes	Ref.
1987	Steve Malaxos	229	Ross Glendinning	170	Chris Mainwaring	166	
1988	John Worsfold	111	Guy McKenna	101	Chris Mainwaring	74	
1989	Guy McKenna	36	Chris Mainwaring	30	Chris Lewis	26	
1990	Chris Lewis	39	Michael Brennan	36	—N/a		
1990	Chris Lewis	39	Dwayne Lamb	36	—N/a		
1991	Craig Turley	43	Guy McKenna	42	Peter Matera	41	
1992	Dean Kemp	46	Chris Mainwaring	38	Glen Jakovich	37	
1993	Glen Jakovich	34	Peter Matera	31	—N/a		
1993	Don Pyke	34	Peter Wilson	31	—N/a		
1994	Glen Jakovich (2)	45	Don Pyke	39	Guy McKenna	38	
1995	Glen Jakovich (3)	36	Dean Kemp	33	—N/a		
1995	Glen Jakovich (3)	36	Mitchell White	33	—N/a		
1996	Drew Banfield	36	Chris Mainwaring	35	Guy McKenna	34	
1997	Peter Matera	37	Dean Kemp	35	Chad Morrison	33	
1997	Peter Matera	37	Dean Kemp	35	Paul Symmons	33	
1998	Ashley McIntosh	39	Ben Cousins	37	Fraser Gehrig	30	
1998	Ashley McIntosh	39	Ben Cousins	37	Chris Waterman	30	
1999	Guy McKenna (2)	36	Drew Banfield	35	—N/a		
1999	Guy McKenna (2)	36	Michael Braun	35	—N/a		
1999	Guy McKenna (2)	36	Ben Cousins	35	—N/a		
2000	Glen Jakovich (4)	27	Dean Kemp	23	Chad Morrison	21	
2001	Ben Cousins	30	Michael Collica	17	Chad Fletcher	16	
2001	Ben Cousins	30	Michael Collica	17	Rowan Jones	16	
2002	Ben Cousins (2)	341	Daniel Kerr	295	Chris Judd	242	
2003	Ben Cousins (3)	303	Chris Judd	269	Chad Fletcher	257	
2004	Chris Judd+	355	Chad Fletcher	319	Dean Cox	271	
2005	Ben Cousins+ (4)	477	Chris Judd	416	Dean Cox	411	
2006	Chris Judd (2)	452	Darren Glass	440	Ben Cousins	429	
2007	Darren Glass	405	Adam Hunter	369	Adam Selwood	367	
2008	Dean Cox	450	Quinten Lynch	360	Adam Selwood	316	
2009	Darren Glass (2)	340	Shannon Hurn	329	Mark LeCras	328	
2010	Mark LeCras	294	Matt Priddis	286	Beau Waters	281	
2011	Darren Glass (3)	398	Matt Priddis	398	Dean Cox	397	
2012	Scott Selwood	403	Dean Cox	400	Shannon Hurn	396	
2013	Matt Priddis	373	Eric Mackenzie	363	Josh Kennedy	363	
2014	Eric Mackenzie	201	Matt Priddis+	190	Luke Shuey	148	
2015	Andrew Gaff	210	Matt Priddis	206	Josh Kennedy	183	
2016	Luke Shuey	157	Josh Kennedy	146	Andrew Gaff	140	
2017	Elliot Yeo^	197	Jeremy McGovern	191	Luke Shuey	180	
2018	Elliot Yeo^ (2)	273	Jack Redden	231	Shannon Hurn	222	
2019	Luke Shuey (2)	258	Elliot Yeo^	239	Brad Sheppard	234	
2020	Nic Naitanui	194	Andrew Gaff^	192	Brad Sheppard	163	
2021	Nic Naitanui (2)	200	Dom Sheed	160	Andrew Gaff	149	
2022	Tom Barrass	182	Shannon Hurn	149	Tim Kelly^	131	
2023	Tim Kelly^	200	Oscar Allen	163	Liam Duggan^	158	
2024	Jeremy McGovern	184	Elliot Yeo^	177	Jake Waterman^	155	
2025	Liam Baker^	338	Reuben Ginbey^	286	Harley Reid^	267	
2026	Harley Reid^	260	Jake Waterman^	209	Tim Kelly^	193	

== Multiple winners ==
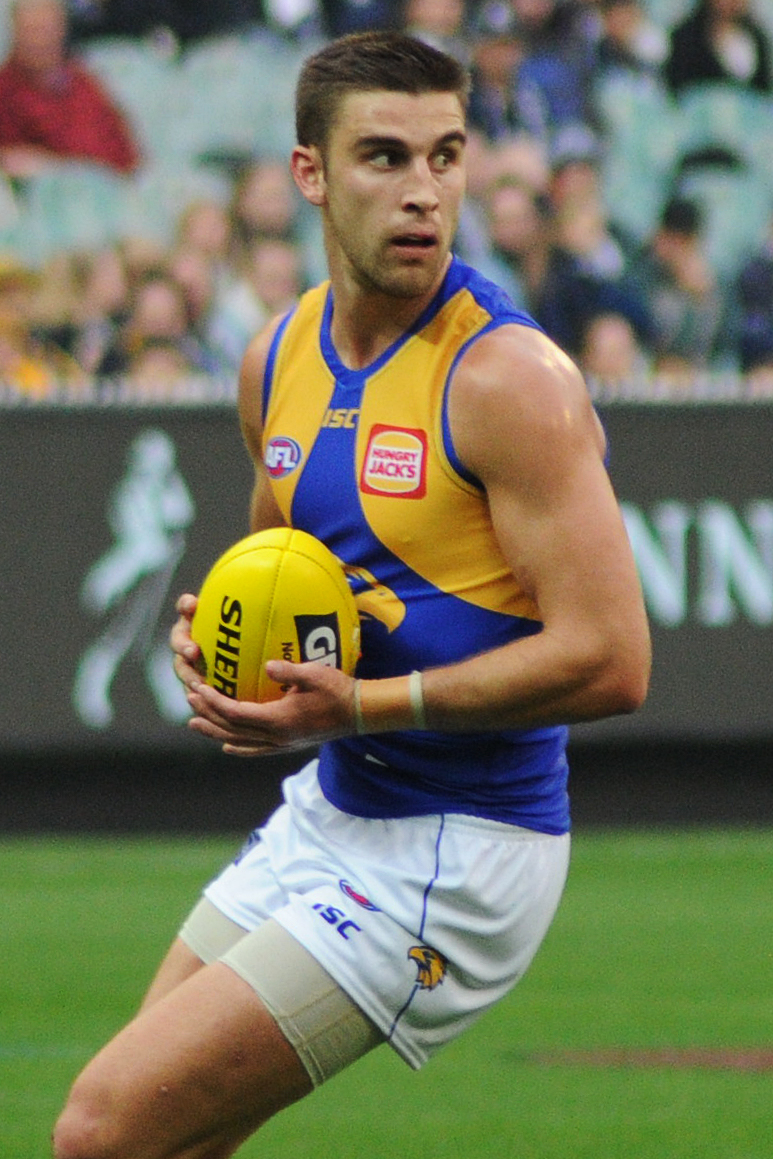
Elliot Yeo is one of eight players to have won multiple times.

^	Denotes current player

Player	Medals	Seasons
Ben Cousins	4	2001, 2002, 2003, 2005
Glen Jakovich	4	1993, 1994, 1995, 2000
Darren Glass	3	2007, 2009, 2011
Chris Judd	2	2004, 2006
Guy McKenna	2	1989, 1999
Nic Naitanui	2	2020, 2021
Luke Shuey	2	2016, 2019
Elliot Yeo^	2	2017, 2018
