= Tim Kelly (footballer) =

Australian rules footballer (born 1994)

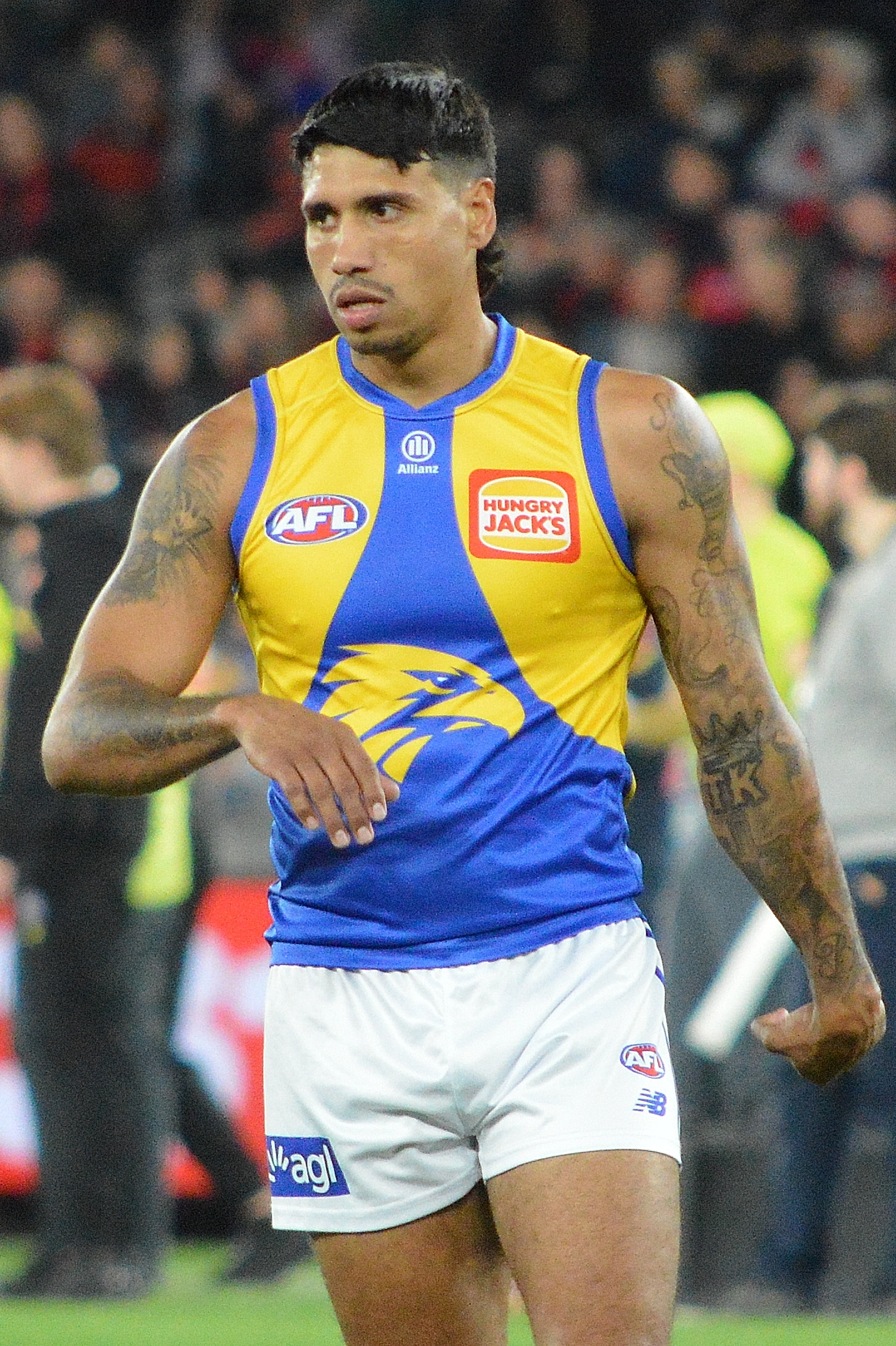
- Kelly with West Coast in May 2026

Personal information
- Full name: Timothy Kelly
- Born: 26 July 1994 (age 32)
- Original team: South Fremantle (WAFL)
- Draft: No. 24, 2017 national draft
- Debut: Round 1, 2018, Geelong vs. Melbourne, at MCG
- Height: 183 cm (6 ft 0 in)
- Weight: 81 kg (179 lb)
- Position: Midfielder

Club information
- Current club: West Coast
- Number: 11

Playing career^{1}
| Years | Club | Games (Goals) |
| 2018–2019 | Geelong | 48 (48) |
| 2020– | West Coast | 137 (38) |
| Total | | 185 (86) |

Representative team honours
| Years | Team | Games (Goals) |
| 2025 | Indigenous All-Stars | 1 (1) |
- ^{1} Playing statistics correct to the end of 2026.

Career highlights
- John Worsfold Medal: 2023; All-Australian team: 2019; Glendinning–Allan Medal: 2021 (round 7); AFLCA best young player award: 2019; AFLPA Best First Year Player: 2018

Timothy Kelly (born 26 July 1994) is a professional Australian rules footballer playing for the West Coast Eagles in the Australian Football League (AFL). He formerly played for the Geelong Football Club in 2018 and 2019.

== Early life and WAFL career ==
Kelly is from Perth and played his junior football for Palmyra. He has an Indigenous Australian father and a Chilean mother. He made his senior WAFL debut for the South Fremantle Football Club in 2013. He was runner-up in the club's best and fairest in 2014. During the 2017 WAFL season he finished runner-up in the Sandover Medal to Haiden Schloithe. Before being drafted into the AFL, Kelly was an apprentice electrician. His partner/fiancée is Caitlin Miller and they have three sons.

== AFL career ==
=== Geelong (2018–2019) ===
After continuously being overlooked in numerous AFL drafts by the West Coast Eagles, Kelly was finally drafted by Geelong with their second selection and twenty-fourth overall in the 2017 national draft as an over-age draftee. He made his debut in the three-point win against Melbourne at the Melbourne Cricket Ground in the opening round of the 2018 season. At the 2018 AFL Players' Association Awards, he was voted Best First Year Player by fellow players. At the end of the 2018 season, Kelly requested a trade to the West Coast Eagles purely just for family reasons as his wife was from Western Australia as well, but Geelong refused to trade him as they could not come to a suitable agreement with the Eagles and he was still contacted for another season. In 2019, Kelly made his first All-Australian selection and finished top 5 in the Brownlow Medal, and helped Geelong reach the preliminary final. Following the season, he once again requested a trade to the Eagles, which this time an agreement was made, and the trade was completed on 9 October 2019.

=== West Coast (2020–present) ===
Kelly joined West Coast on a six-year deal valued at more than $4 million. In 2023, he won the John Worsfold Medal as the Eagles best and fairest player.

== Statistics ==
Updated to the end of round 22, 2026.

Legend
| G | Goals | K | Kicks | D | Disposals | T | Tackles |
| B | Behinds | H | Handballs | M | Marks |

| Season | Team | No. | Games | Totals | | | | | | | Averages (per game) | | | | | | | Votes |
| Season | Team | No. | Games | G | B | K | H | D | M | T | G | B | K | H | D | M | T | Votes |
|---|---|---|---|---|---|---|---|---|---|---|---|---|---|---|---|---|---|---|
| 2018 | Geelong | 11 | 23 | 24 | 16 | 277 | 249 | 526 | 77 | 81 | 1.0 | 0.7 | 12.0 | 10.8 | 22.9 | 3.3 | 3.5 | 13 |
| 2019 | Geelong | 11 | 25 | 24 | 18 | 381 | 254 | 635 | 89 | 106 | 1.0 | 0.7 | 15.2 | 10.2 | 25.4 | 3.6 | 4.2 | 24 |
| 2020 (Note: The 2020 season was played with 17 home-and-away matches per team (down from 22) and 16-minute quarters with time on (down from 20-minute quarters with time on) due to the impact of the COVID-19 pandemic.) | West Coast | 11 | 18 | 5 | 4 | 207 | 153 | 360 | 46 | 76 | 0.3 | 0.2 | 11.5 | 8.5 | 20.0 | 2.6 | 4.2 | 11 |
| 2021 | West Coast | 11 | 19 | 6 | 8 | 245 | 209 | 454 | 62 | 64 | 0.3 | 0.4 | 12.9 | 11.0 | 23.9 | 3.3 | 3.4 | 10 |
| 2022 | West Coast | 11 | 17 | 6 | 5 | 211 | 201 | 412 | 60 | 67 | 0.4 | 0.3 | 12.4 | 11.8 | 24.2 | 3.5 | 3.9 | 3 |
| 2023 | West Coast | 11 | 22 | 10 | 6 | 288 | 333 | 621 | 75 | 104 | 0.5 | 0.3 | 13.1 | 15.1 | 28.2 | 3.4 | 4.7 | 11 |
| 2024 | West Coast | 11 | 20 | 4 | 9 | 240 | 238 | 478 | 55 | 97 | 0.2 | 0.5 | 12.0 | 11.9 | 23.9 | 2.8 | 4.9 | 5 |
| 2025 | West Coast | 11 | 20 | 5 | 8 | 175 | 177 | 352 | 55 | 57 | 0.3 | 0.4 | 8.8 | 8.9 | 17.6 | 2.8 | 2.9 | 0 |
| 2026 | West Coast | 11 | 19 | 2 | 4 | 221 | 227 | 448 | 76 | 63 | 0.1 | 0.2 | 11.6 | 11.9 | 23.6 | 4.0 | 3.3 | 0 |
| Career | | | 183 | 86 | 78 | 2245 | 2041 | 4286 | 595 | 715 | 0.5 | 0.4 | 12.3 | 11.2 | 23.4 | 3.3 | 3.9 | 77 |

== Personal life ==
Kelly's younger brother, Tyson, played WAFL Colts for South Fremantle in 2023.
