= 2020 AFL season =

124th season of the Australian Football League (AFL)

2020 AFL premiership season

Overview
- Date: 19 March – 24 October 2020
- Teams: 18
- Premiers: Richmond; 13th premiership
- Runners-up: Geelong; 9th runners-up result
- Minor premiers: Port Adelaide; 4th minor premiership
- Brownlow Medallist: Lachie Neale (Brisbane Lions); 31 votes
- Coleman Medallist: Tom Hawkins (Geelong); 42 goals

Attendance
- Matches played: 162
- Total attendance: 1,033,037 (6,377 per match)
- Highest (H&A): 27,339 (Round 13, West Coast vs Greater Western Sydney)
- Highest (finals): 32,865 (First Elimination Final, West Coast vs Collingwood)

The 2020 AFL season was the 124th season of the Australian Football League (AFL), the highest level senior men's Australian rules football competition in Australia, which was known as the Victorian Football League until 1989. The season featured eighteen clubs.

Played during the first year of the COVID-19 pandemic, the season commenced on 19 March and was suspended four days later; it resumed on 11 June and ran until 24 October. A shortened season was played, comprising a 17-game home-and-away season followed by a finals series featuring the top eight clubs; all matches were shortened to 80% of their usual length. Virus outbreaks and interstate travel restrictions precluded games in many states for much of the season, with all clubs spending parts of the season temporarily relocated to quarantine hubs, particularly in South East Queensland where almost half of all matches were played – including the Grand Final, the first time it had been played outside Victoria. Health directives resulted in restricted match attendances throughout the year, including thirty matches played behind closed doors.

The premiership was won by the Richmond Football Club for the 13th time and second time consecutively, after it defeated Geelong by 31 points in the 2020 AFL Grand Final.

== Impact of the COVID-19 pandemic ==
The 2020 season was disrupted by the COVID-19 pandemic, which was formally declared a pandemic by the World Health Organization on 11 March 2020, eight days prior to the scheduled start of the premiership season. Restrictions imposed by the different state governments related to social distancing, lockdowns of non-essential services which lasted for three months across the country, and border controls for interstate and international travel, all had significant effects on the completion of the 2020 season.

=== Fixture ===
Prior to the commencement of the season, anticipating that the season would be forced to cease at the peak of the virus, the AFL shortened the fixture from 22 matches per team to 17, with each team playing each other once and serving one bye. The season then commenced on 19 March as originally scheduled; but as restrictions, followed by periods of formal quarantine, were introduced on interstate travel, the season was suspended after Round 1.

The season was suspended for more than two months. On 15 May, as most states began easing restrictions, the league's plan to resume the season was announced: clubs began non-contact training from 18 May, and full contact training from 25 May ahead of resuming competitive matches from 11 June, with the revised fixture released gradually throughout the year, and changing regularly and often at short notice when the situation forced it.

The first major fixturing challenge occurred in the aftermath of Round 4, when a spike in Victorian COVID-19 cases prompted other states to either impose tighter quarantine restrictions on Victorians, or defer the relaxation of restrictions already in place. Although this forced two planned Round 5 matches—Richmond vs West Coast and Melbourne vs Sydney—to be redrawn at less than a week's notice (Richmond instead faced Melbourne in Victoria, and Sydney faced West Coast in Queensland) and the entire planned Round 6 and 7 fixtures to be redrawn, the season continued without suspension. The gradual release of the fixture also allowed the flexibility to reschedule any games which were postponed due to positive COVID-19 tests among players or staff.

When games were postponed or rescheduled at short notice, other games within the same round were often also rescheduled to ensure the primetime television slots were filled.

=== Club medical restrictions ===
During the peak of the hiatus, players were allowed to train only within the strict limits of the government restrictions on public gatherings; at the height of the pandemic in April and May, when gatherings larger than two were restricted, players could train only in pairs. When the league returned to training and playing, it was done with strict, enforceable protocols and monitoring in place to ensure that the clubs would not suffer a virus outbreak, and that any virus cases could be contained with minimal impact to the wider competition. To this effect, players, umpires and staff were regularly tested for the virus and continued to train mostly in small groups, allowing individual players or small groups to be segregated and contained in the event of positive cases. Players and club personnel were subject to protocols which extended to players' personal lives, which were above and beyond the lockdown guidelines still in place for the general public, in order to protect the AFL season from suffering an outbreak; and families and partners who were part of quarantine hubs came under the same restrictions.

There were many breaches during the season, resulting in fines for the players and clubs involved, or suspensions in the most egregious cases:

- Richmond's Sydney Stack and Callum Coleman-Jones (ten matches each), for being involved in a fight outside a Surfers Paradise kebab shop in the early hours of 4 September.
- Sydney's Elijah Taylor (rest of season, which amounted to six home-and-away matches), for bringing his girlfriend into the club's Perth quarantine hotel.
- Adelaide assistant coach Ben Hart (six training weeks), for allowing training groups to be too close to each other on a quarantine camp in early May.
- Collingwood's Steele Sidebottom (four matches) and Lynden Dunn (one match), for travelling in an Uber and visiting more than one unauthorised house, the night concluding with Sidebottom being driven home by police.
- Port Adelaide's Peter Ladhams (three matches) and Dan Houston (two matches), for inviting non-authorised residents to their house.
- Melbourne's Charlie Spargo (two matches) and Kysaiah Pickett (one match), for travelling via an Uber to an unauthorised house for a gathering.
- Port Adelaide's Ollie Wines (one week), for inviting a non-authorised resident to his house.
- Essendon's Brandon Zerk-Thatcher (one week), for breaching living arrangement protocols.

Throughout the season, AFL-listed players were not permitted to participate in the state league competitions (the VFL, SANFL, WAFL and NEAFL) due to the greater risk of external threats in the semi-professional state league environment; this meant there was no formal competitive reserves football for players who were not selected in the seniors. (The NEAFL and VFL ended up cancelling their seasons altogether). Clubs based in the same state were permitted to arrange ad hoc scratch matches for their unselected players against each other and in empty stadiums to enable some match practice; these could be stand-alone games or curtain raisers to senior games.

Through all of these restrictions, there were ultimately no confirmed positive cases of the virus among the league's players. The only positive tests ever returned were by Conor McKenna (Essendon), who returned two false positives, followed by a confirmed negative, over the round 3 weekend, resulting in the cancellation of Essendon's scheduled match against Melbourne. Coming during a phase of the pandemic when any positive test was taboo in society, McKenna received negative media scrutiny and social media abuse after the positive results.

=== Quarantine hubs and club relocation ===
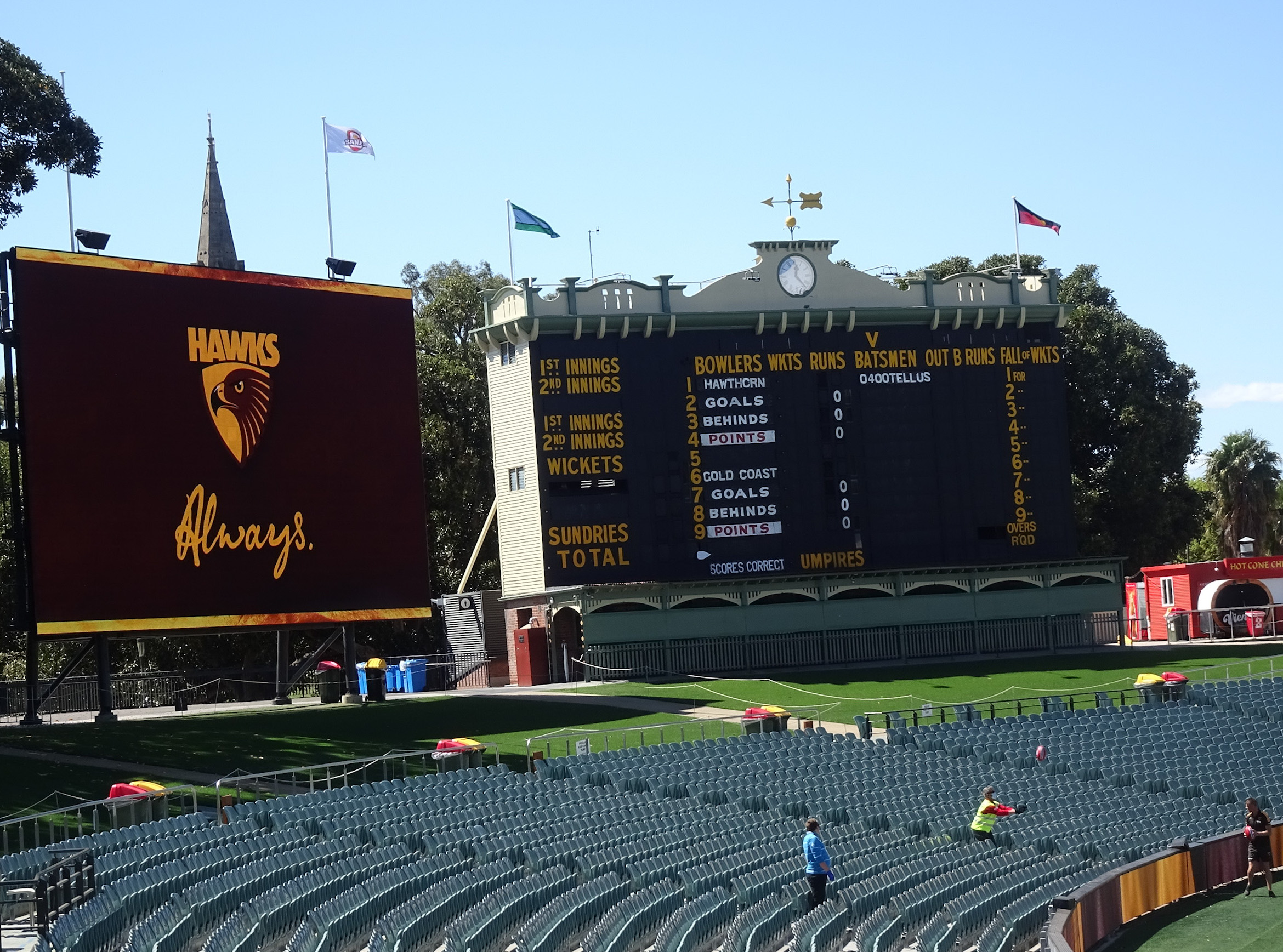
Empty seats at Adelaide Oval prior to the round 18 match between Hawthorn and Gold Coast. Restrictions on venue capacity had been implemented to combat the spread of COVID-19.

Interstate travel restrictions and quarantine periods were a significant impediment to the completion of the season after the resumption, with many state border crossings subject to mandatory 14-day quarantine periods. Western Australia and Tasmania had the tightest restrictions, requiring quarantine for all entries throughout the entire season; South Australia had similar restrictions which were loosened after Round 5. Border crossings around the rest of the country were freer; but, as second waves of virus cases occurred in Victoria (after Round 5) and New South Wales (after Round 10), quarantines were imposed on travellers leaving those states. This precluded a conventional interstate home-and-away fixture, and meant that Queensland – which maintained few virus cases and had the most favourable quarantine arrangements – became critical to the completion of the season.

The border restrictions were managed by requiring several clubs to relocate outside their states; or, to set-up in weeks-long quarantine hubs, in which clubs travelled at the same time to a restricted state for an extended three- or four-week trip, quarantined there and played several games against other teams in the hub. Players' immediate families were permitted to join them at the league's expense, but were subject to the same lifestyle restrictions and virus testing regime as the players.

The relocation of all ten Victorian clubs occurred after Round 5. Carlton, Western Bulldogs, North Melbourne, St Kilda, Richmond and Essendon moved to south-east Queensland; and Collingwood, Hawthorn, Geelong and Melbourne moved to New South Wales. The relocation of the six New South Wales based clubs (Sydney, Greater Western Sydney and the four Victorian clubs) to Queensland then occurred after Round 8. These relocations lasted until the end of the season.

The season's first quarantine hub occurred immediately after the resumption, and featured the clubs from South Australia and Western Australia – the most tightly restricted state at that time. The clubs were relocated to south-east Queensland – with the Western Australian teams arriving in Round 2 and the South Australian teams arriving in Round 3 (after their Round 2 Showdown game in Adelaide). The visiting teams played each other and the two Queensland-based clubs in a hub until Round 5. The two West Australian teams remained in the hub for an additional week and flew back to West Australia following Round 6, and the South Australian hub members returned to South Australia after Round 5 but still travelled weekly to Queensland over subsequent weeks.

From that point on, three three-week quarantine hubs were staged in Perth, to allow matches to be played there despite season-long quarantine requirements. Each time, two interstate clubs travelled at once from Queensland, and played each other while in quarantine, then the two Perth clubs while out of quarantine. These hubs were:

- Rounds 7–9: Geelong and Collingwood
- Rounds 9–12: Hawthorn and Carlton (including a bye)
- Rounds 12–14: Sydney and Greater Western Sydney

Fremantle and West Coast later returned to a Queensland hub for the final four rounds of the home-and-away season.

Teams could also travel from Queensland to the Northern Territory, where three games were played. However, season-long Tasmanian border restrictions to all states resulted in no AFL matches being played in the state for the first time since 2000.

Border restrictions ultimately also precluded the playing of any finals in Victoria or New South Wales – including the Grand Final – and limited finals in Western Australia to the first week only, since the bye week after Round 18 allowed time to quarantine. For the first three weeks of finals, clubs unable to play in their home states were given the option to nominate a preferred home ground from the Gabba, Metricon Stadium and Adelaide Oval for home finals. On 2 September, the Grand Final was formally scheduled for Saturday 24 October, the latest in the year a Grand Final had been played; it was scheduled at night to avoid a clash with the 100th running of the Cox Plate that afternoon, making it the first Grand Final not to be played in the afternoon timeslot; and, it was scheduled at the Gabba, making it the first AFL Grand Final to be played outside of Melbourne.

The hub arrangements resulted in many other fixturing anomalies. Among the most notable occurred in Round 6, when all nine games were played in New South Wales and Queensland, traditionally rugby league territory. Whole rounds were played with no matches in Melbourne, which had only previously occurred in Round 8, 1952 (the promotional National Day Round). Clubs hosted several fixtured home games at interstate venues, and hub stadiums were sometimes used for multiple games on the same day – the first time this had happened in senior VFL/AFL football since a double-header in Round 19, 1986. The desire to compress the schedule meant that the seven-game Round 10 and six-game Round 15 were played entirely on weekdays, the first time this had happened outside of rounds played on a public holiday.

=== Crowds ===
Government restrictions on gatherings meant that, starting in Round 1, crowds were locked out of senior VFL/AFL matches for the first time in the code's history. State governments gradually allowed crowds, often small and restricted in size, into games, starting immediately from the resumption in Round 2 in South Australia and New South Wales, from Round 3 in Queensland, and from football's resumption in Round 7 in Western Australia. The sizes of allowable crowds changed as the season progressed, with early season Queensland and New South Wales crowds limited to only a few hundred, while half-full crowds were allowed in the largely virus-free Western Australia from Round 7.

Starting in Round 2, after the resumption of the season, broadcasters experimented with adding artificial crowd noise to lend a more normal feel to their telecasts to overcome the lack of genuine crowds in stadiums.

The total attendance for 2020 was 1,033,037, only 13.74% of 2019's unaffected 7,517,677 total. The average attendance of 6,377 per game was 17.56% of the 2019 season's average of 36,317.

=== Rule changes ===
Throughout the season, matches were played for a shortened length of 16 minutes plus time on per quarter, instead of 20 minutes plus time on. This was originally done at the start of the season, in the hope that playing shorter games could facilitate more frequent games than weekly, maximising the games which could be played before the anticipated suspension of the season; but this did not eventuate, since the season was suspended after only one round. It was then retained after the resumption to lighten the load on players to take account for the compromised training schedule; and, to allow make-up games to be more easily scheduled between rounds when matches were postponed or refixtured. As a direct result of this, it was a very low-scoring season, and several records or long-standing marks in low scoring were set during the season.

=== Financials ===
When the season was suspended, the league and clubs were faced with an acute cash-flow shortage, as the gate and broadcast revenues which had been budgeted for stopped immediately; clubs deriving revenues from gaming and other public venues also saw those revenues drop when public gatherings were restricted. The league and clubs all stood down or severely reduced hours for huge percentages of their staff during the suspension; furthermore, the AFL agreed with both the AFLPA and ALFUA to enact significant play cuts for the players and umpires for the season, amounting to 50% of their wage from the point of the suspension until the end of the season, and increasing to 70% for any period of suspension which extends beyond the end of May. The league successfully obtained a $500–600 million line of credit with the National Australia Bank and ANZ Bank, leveraged against its ownership of Marvel Stadium, to cover its and its clubs' cash shortfalls during the suspension.

Resuming the season and playing the shortened 17-game season in full, even without crowds, was important to ensure the league still took in most of its television revenue. Prior to the resumption, the league renegotiated its $417-million-per-year broadcast deals with the Seven Network and Foxtel, ultimately resulting in a total television revenue reduction of approximately $150 million over 2020–2022. On top of this, the cost of running the Queensland hubs, including medical costs for ongoing COVID-19 testing, resulted in a $60 million expense for the league.

The overall financial losses for the league in the 2020 season, compared with the budgeted results prior to the pandemic, were less than but in the order of $100 million – a substantially better result than the $1 billion loss which was feared as a worst-case scenario when the season was originally suspended.

=== Other effects ===
Among the other direct impacts of the pandemic were:

- The Dreamtime at the 'G match between Richmond and Essendon was not played at the Melbourne Cricket Ground per its name, but instead at TIO Stadium in Darwin.
- St Kilda and Port Adelaide did not play a match at Jiangwan Stadium in Shanghai, China, as scheduled as part of the original Round 11 – this decision was made prior to the season while the virus was still mostly prevalent only within China and prior to its spread in Australia, but would eventually have been mandated by restrictions on international travel.
- The two-Test international rules football series against Ireland, planned to have been played in Ireland in November, was cancelled.

== Pre-season ==
=== Marsh Community Series ===
The pre-season series of games returned as the 2020 Marsh Community Series, with teams playing two games each. The games were stand-alone, with no overall winner of the series. Each team played two games, many at suburban or regional venues, while all games were televised on Fox Footy. The series was played prior to the spread of the pandemic to Australia, under normal pre-season rules and match conditions.

	Week 1
Thursday, 20 February (7:10 pm)	St Kilda 17.9 (111)	def.	Hawthorn 13.12 (90)	RSEA Park (crowd: 8,187)	Report
Friday, 21 February (7:10 pm)	Western Bulldogs 15.11 (101)	def.	North Melbourne 9.3 (57)	Marvel Stadium (crowd: 5,465)	Report
Saturday, 22 February (4:40 pm)	Melbourne 15.13 (103)	def.	Adelaide 10.10 (70)	Casey Fields (crowd: 3,095)	Report
Saturday, 22 February (6:40 pm)	Gold Coast 17.20 (122)	def.	Geelong 7.12 (54)	Metricon Stadium (crowd: 5,903)	Report
Sunday, 23 February (3:10 pm)	Brisbane Lions 12.5 (77)	def. by	Port Adelaide 14.14 (98)	Moreton Bay Central Sports Complex (crowd: 2,027)	Report

	Week 2
Thursday, 27 February (4:40 pm)	West Coast 13.9 (87)	def. by	Essendon 14.11 (95)	Mineral Resources Park (crowd: 4,302)	Report
Saturday, 29 February (4:10 pm)	Greater Western Sydney 19.7 (121)	def.	Sydney 3.9 (27)	Blacktown International Sportspark (crowd: 2,022)	Report
Saturday, 29 February (4:10 pm)	Fremantle 13.12 (90)	def.	Carlton 5.13 (43)	David Grays Arena (crowd: 5,127)	Report
Sunday, 1 March (4:10 pm)	Richmond 6.8 (44)	def. by	Collingwood 13.6 (84)	Norm Minns Oval (crowd: 7,164)	Report

	Week 3
Friday, 6 March (4:20 pm)	Adelaide 9.10 (64)	def. by	Gold Coast 9.17 (71)	Flinders University Stadium (crowd: 2,788)	Report
Friday, 6 March (7:40 pm)	Hawthorn 6.13 (49)	def. by	Melbourne 12.9 (81)	University of Tasmania Stadium (crowd: 2,712)	Report
Saturday, 7 March (3:40 pm)	Port Adelaide 14.11 (95)	def.	Western Bulldogs 13.7 (85)	Bennett Oval, Whyalla (crowd: 4,770)	Report
Saturday, 7 March (4:10 pm)	West Coast 7.12 (54)	def. by	Fremantle 8.7 (55)	HBF Arena (crowd: 10,384)	Report
Sunday, 8 March (12:40 pm)	Greater Western Sydney 17.7 (109)	def.	Richmond 14.11 (95)	Robertson Oval (crowd: 6,556)	Report
Sunday, 8 March (3:50 pm)	Collingwood 9.3 (57)	def. by	St Kilda 10.8 (68)	Morwell Recreation Reserve (crowd: 5,431)	Report
Sunday, 8 March (6:40 pm)	Carlton 10.6 (66)	def. by	Brisbane Lions 16.15 (111)	Ikon Park (crowd: 7,148)	Report
Monday, 9 March (1:40 pm)	North Melbourne 14.6 (90)	def.	Sydney 12.7 (79)	Kingston Twin Ovals, Hobart (crowd: 2,571)	Report
Monday, 9 March (4:40 pm)	Geelong 9.7 (61)	def. by	Essendon 9.11 (65)	Central Reserve, Colac (crowd: 7,598)	Report

=== State of Origin for Bushfire Relief Match ===
A one-off benefit match was played on 28 February 2020, as a fundraiser for the relief effort for the 2019–20 Australian bushfire season. The league donated $2.5 million to disaster relief funds in association with the match. Selection for the two teams was under state of origin rules, and it was the first interstate representative match featuring AFL-listed players since the AFL Hall of Fame Tribute Match held in 2008. Played prior to the pandemic's spread to Australia, it was the highest-attended football match of the year.

State of Origin for Bushfire Relief Match
Friday, 28 February 2020 (7:50 pm)	Victoria	def.	All-Stars	Marvel Stadium (crowd: 51,052)	Report
4.1 (25); 10.2 (62); 15.7 (97); 24.10 (154)	Q1; Q2; Q3; Final	4.7 (31); 9.14 (68); 15.16 (106); 15.18 (108)	Umpires: Fisher, Stephens, Nicholls, Williamson; Best on Ground Medal: Dustin Martin (Victoria)
Papley 5 Kelly, Greene 4 Martin, Gaff, Bontempelli, Gresham 2 Dangerfield, J Cameron, Lynch 1	Goals	C Cameron 3 Coniglio, Breust, Riewoldt, Smith 2 Neale, Weller, Walters, Hill 1
Kelly, Martin, Greene, Papley, Pendlebury, Haynes, Cotchin, Dangerfield	Best	Coniglio, C Cameron, Mills, Cripps, Neale, Johannisen

== Premiership season ==
As the pandemic developed, only the first round was played as originally drawn. The rest of the fixture was redrawn into a new seventeen-round season in which each team played each other once. The new rescheduled fixture was released gradually through the season, often at short notice, to allow the fixture to respond to developments in the spread of the virus.

=== Round 1 ===
	Round 1
Thursday, 19 March (7:40 pm)	Richmond 16.9 (105)	def.	Carlton 12.9 (81)	MCG (crowd: 0)	Report
Friday, 20 March (7:50 pm)	Western Bulldogs 5.4 (34)	def. by	Collingwood 13.8 (86)	Marvel Stadium (crowd: 0)	Report
Saturday, 21 March (2:10 pm)	Essendon 9.9 (63)	def.	Fremantle 8.9 (57)	Marvel Stadium (crowd: 0)	Report
Saturday, 21 March (4:35 pm)	Adelaide 11.5 (71)	def. by	Sydney 11.8 (74)	Adelaide Oval (crowd: 0)	Report
Saturday, 21 March (7:40 pm)	Greater Western Sydney 17.3 (105)	def.	Geelong 11.7 (73)	GIANTS Stadium (crowd: 0)	Report
Saturday, 21 March (6:40 pm)	Gold Coast 4.5 (29)	def. by	Port Adelaide 10.16 (76)	Metricon Stadium (crowd: 0)	Report
Sunday, 22 March (1:05 pm)	North Melbourne 8.8 (56)	def.	St Kilda 7.12 (54)	Marvel Stadium (crowd: 0)	Report
Sunday, 22 March (3:35 pm)	Hawthorn 14.6 (90)	def.	Brisbane Lions 9.8 (62)	MCG (crowd: 0)	Report
Sunday, 22 March (3:40 pm)	West Coast 12.6 (78)	def.	Melbourne 7.9 (51)	Optus Stadium (crowd: 0)	Report
Greater Western Sydney scored at 85% accuracy, beating its previous highest accuracy of 77.78% (minimum 15 scoring shots) in Round 11, 2016, also against Geelong.

=== Round 2 ===
	Round 2
Thursday, 11 June (7:40 pm)	Collingwood 5.6 (36)	drew with	Richmond 5.6 (36)	MCG (crowd: 0)	Report
Friday, 12 June (7:50 pm)	Geelong 17.6 (108)	def.	Hawthorn 7.5 (47)	GMHBA Stadium (crowd: 0)	Report
Saturday, 13 June (1:45 pm)	Brisbane Lions 12.9 (81)	def.	Fremantle 10.9 (69)	Gabba (crowd: 0)	Report
Saturday, 13 June (4:35 pm)	Carlton 7.11 (53)	def. by	Melbourne 8.6 (54)	Marvel Stadium (crowd: 0)	Report
Saturday, 13 June (7:10 pm)	Port Adelaide 17.8 (110)	def.	Adelaide 5.5 (35)	Adelaide Oval (crowd: 2,240)	Report
Saturday, 13 June (7:40 pm)	Gold Coast 14.6 (90)	def.	West Coast 6.10 (46)	Metricon Stadium (crowd: 0)	Report
Sunday, 14 June (1:05 pm)	Greater Western Sydney 8.12 (60)	def. by	North Melbourne 12.8 (80)	GIANTS Stadium (crowd: 350)	Report
Sunday, 14 June (3:35 pm)	Sydney 11.7 (73)	def. by	Essendon 12.7 (79)	SCG (crowd: 337)	Report
Sunday, 14 June (6:05 pm)	St Kilda 14.4 (88)	def.	Western Bulldogs 7.7 (49)	Marvel Stadium (crowd: 0)	Report
Collingwood's and Richmond's combined score of 10.12 (72) was the lowest combined score since Round 11, 1999.; Port Adelaide recorded their largest winning margin, 75 points, against Adelaide in a Showdown.; Adelaide's score of 5.5 (35) was the lowest score by either side in a Showdown.; Gold Coast won its first game since Round 4, 2019, breaking a 19 game losing streak.

=== Round 3 ===
	Round 3
Thursday, 18 June (7:40 pm)	Richmond 5.9 (39)	def. by	Hawthorn 11.5 (71)	MCG (crowd: 0)	Report
Friday, 19 June (7:50 pm)	Western Bulldogs 8.9 (57)	def.	Greater Western Sydney 4.9 (33)	Marvel Stadium (crowd: 0)	Report
Saturday, 20 June (1:45 pm)	North Melbourne 8.12 (60)	def. by	Sydney 10.11 (71)	Marvel Stadium (crowd: 0)	Report
Saturday, 20 June (4:35 pm)	Collingwood 12.9 (81)	def.	St Kilda 5.7 (37)	MCG (crowd: 0)	Report
Saturday, 20 June (7:40 pm)	Geelong 11.11 (77)	def. by	Carlton 12.7 (79)	GMHBA Stadium (crowd: 0)	Report
Saturday, 20 June (7:40 pm)	Brisbane Lions 10.14 (74)	def.	West Coast 6.8 (44)	Gabba (crowd: 1,965)	Report
Sunday, 21 June (3:05 pm)	Gold Coast 12.10 (82)	def.	Adelaide 4.5 (29)	Metricon Stadium (crowd: 1,997)	Report
Sunday, 21 June (cancelled)	Essendon	v	Melbourne	MCG
Sunday, 21 June (8:10 pm)	Fremantle 6.5 (41)	def. by	Port Adelaide 10.10 (70)	Metricon Stadium (crowd: 180)	Report
	Bye; Essendon, Melbourne
Conor McKenna (Essendon) tested positive to COVID-19 in his Saturday pre-match test, resulting in the Essendon vs Melbourne match being postponed indefinitely at 24 hours notice. The match was ultimately rescheduled to Round 18, and Round 3 was retroactively considered Essendon's and Melbourne's bye for the season.; Gold Coast defeated Adelaide for the first time, having lost their first thirteen encounters against them. This meant that Gold Coast had now beaten every other team in the league at least once.; Adelaide lost at Metricon Stadium for the first time in their history, breaking an eleven-game winning streak at the venue.; Adelaide's final score of 4.5 (29) was its lowest score at Metricon Stadium, and the lowest score conceded by Gold Coast.; Adelaide's three quarter time score of 1.4 (10) was its lowest three quarter time score of all time.

=== Round 4 ===
	Round 4
Thursday, 25 June (7:40 pm)	Sydney 5.9 (39)	def. by	Western Bulldogs 10.7 (67)	SCG (crowd: 605)	Report
Friday, 26 June (7:50 pm)	Greater Western Sydney 10.6 (66)	def.	Collingwood 9.10 (64)	GIANTS Stadium (crowd: 487)	Report
Saturday, 27 June (1:45 pm)	Port Adelaide 13.11 (89)	def.	West Coast 6.5 (41)	Metricon Stadium (crowd: 450)	Report
Saturday, 27 June (4:35 pm)	St Kilda 15.3 (93)	def.	Richmond 10.7 (67)	Marvel Stadium (crowd: 0)	Report
Saturday, 27 June (7:40 pm)	Essendon 8.3 (51)	def. by	Carlton 7.10 (52)	MCG (crowd: 0)	Report
Saturday, 27 June (7:40 pm)	Gold Coast 10.4 (64)	def.	Fremantle 8.3 (51)	Metricon Stadium (crowd: 5,106)	Report
Sunday, 28 June (1:05 pm)	Brisbane Lions 10.23 (83)	def.	Adelaide 7.4 (46)	Gabba (crowd: 7,354)	Report
Sunday, 28 June (3:35 pm)	Melbourne 6.8 (44)	def. by	Geelong 7.5 (47)	MCG (crowd: 0)	Report
Sunday, 28 June (6:05 pm)	Hawthorn 8.10 (58)	def.	North Melbourne 8.6 (54)	Marvel Stadium (crowd: 0)	Report
In the first half of their game, Gold Coast scored 7.0 (42) and Fremantle scored 6.0 (36), making it the first half of football in VFL/AFL history in which no behinds were scored.

=== Round 5 ===
	Round 5
Thursday, 2 July (7:40 pm)	Carlton 8.7 (55)	def. by	St Kilda 11.7 (73)	Marvel Stadium (crowd: 0)	Report
Friday, 3 July (7:50 pm)	Collingwood 7.6 (48)	def. by	Essendon 10.3 (63)	MCG (crowd: 0)	Report
Saturday, 4 July (1:45 pm)	West Coast 11.11 (77)	def.	Sydney 6.7 (43)	Metricon Stadium (crowd: 2,238)	Report
Saturday, 4 July (4:35 pm)	Geelong 13.11 (89)	def.	Gold Coast 8.4 (52)	GMHBA Stadium (crowd: 0)	Report
Saturday, 4 July (7:40 pm)	Western Bulldogs 13.9 (87)	def.	North Melbourne 5.8 (38)	Marvel Stadium (crowd: 0)	Report
Saturday, 4 July (7:40 pm)	Brisbane Lions 12.13 (85)	def.	Port Adelaide 6.12 (48)	Gabba (crowd: 10,161)	Report
Sunday, 5 July (1:05 pm)	Adelaide 4.10 (34)	def. by	Fremantle 8.6 (54)	Metricon Stadium (crowd: 418)	Report
Sunday, 5 July (3:35 pm)	Melbourne 8.4 (52)	def. by	Richmond 12.7 (79)	MCG (crowd: 0)	Report
Sunday, 5 July (6:10 pm)	Greater Western Sydney 13.5 (83)	def.	Hawthorn 7.7 (49)	GIANTS Stadium (crowd: 5,674)	Report

=== Round 6 ===
	Round 6
Thursday, 9 July (7:40 pm)	Geelong 11.7 (73)	def.	Brisbane Lions 6.10 (46)	SCG (crowd: 1,311)	Report
Friday, 10 July (7:50 pm)	Collingwood 8.11 (59)	def.	Hawthorn 3.9 (27)	GIANTS Stadium (crowd: 1,772)	Report
Saturday, 11 July (12:35 pm)	Fremantle 12.7 (79)	def.	St Kilda 11.7 (73)	Metricon Stadium (crowd: 638)	Report
Saturday, 11 July (3:05 pm)	West Coast 10.7 (67)	def.	Adelaide 5.4 (34)	Gabba (crowd: 210)	Report
Saturday, 11 July (6:05 pm)	Melbourne 12.8 (80)	def.	Gold Coast 9.9 (63)	GIANTS Stadium (crowd: 250)	Report
Saturday, 11 July (7:40 pm)	Essendon 9.13 (67)	def.	North Melbourne 7.11 (53)	Metricon Stadium (crowd: 4,271)	Report
Sunday, 12 July (1:05 pm)	Port Adelaide 9.9 (63)	def.	Greater Western Sydney 6.10 (46)	Metricon Stadium (crowd: 368)	Report
Sunday, 12 July (3:35 pm)	Richmond 4.10 (34)	def.	Sydney 3.8 (26)	Gabba (crowd: 3,606)	Report
Sunday, 12 July (6:45 pm)	Carlton 16.7 (103)	def.	Western Bulldogs 7.9 (51)	Metricon Stadium (crowd: 2,178)	Report
Hawthorn's score of 3.9 (27) was its lowest in a game since Round 21, 1975.; The combined score of 7.18 (60) in the rain-affected match between Richmond and Sydney was the lowest in any game since Round 16, 1996.; Sydney's score of 3.8 (26) was its lowest in a game since Round 13, 1988.

=== Round 7 ===
	Round 7
Thursday, 16 July (6:10 pm)	Geelong 5.5 (35)	def. by	Collingwood 8.9 (57)	Optus Stadium (crowd: 22,077)	Report
Friday, 17 July (7:50 pm)	Essendon 7.9 (51)	def. by	Western Bulldogs 14.9 (93)	Metricon Stadium (crowd: 4,949)	Report
Saturday, 18 July (1:45 pm)	Greater Western Sydney 10.8 (68)	def. by	Brisbane Lions 13.10 (88)	GIANTS Stadium (crowd: 3,168)	Report
Saturday, 18 July (4:35 pm)	Sydney 9.6 (60)	def. by	Gold Coast 13.14 (92)	SCG (crowd: 6,000)	Report
Saturday, 18 July (7:40 pm)	Richmond 11.11 (77)	def.	North Melbourne 2.11 (23)	Metricon Stadium (crowd: 4,337)	Report
Sunday, 19 July (1:05 pm)	Carlton 9.7 (61)	def. by	Port Adelaide 9.10 (64)	Gabba (crowd: 3,510)	Report
Sunday, 19 July (3:35 pm)	Hawthorn 7.6 (48)	def. by	Melbourne 14.7 (91)	GIANTS Stadium (crowd: 750)	Report
Sunday, 19 July (6:35 pm)	Fremantle 5.2 (32)	def. by	West Coast 9.8 (62)	Optus Stadium (crowd: 25,306)	Report
Monday, 20 July (7:40 pm)	Adelaide 8.7 (55)	def. by	St Kilda 12.6 (78)	Adelaide Oval (crowd: 13,579)	Report
Robbie Gray kicked a goal after the final siren to win the match for Port Adelaide.; North Melbourne's score of 2.11 (23) was the lowest score recorded at Metricon Stadium.; St Kilda won its first premiership AFL match at Adelaide Oval, after ten consecutive losses.

=== Round 8 ===
	Round 8
Thursday, 23 July (7:40 pm)	Gold Coast 6.10 (46)	def. by	Western Bulldogs 7.9 (51)	Metricon Stadium (crowd: 4,039)	Report
Friday, 24 July (7:50 pm)	Greater Western Sydney 9.8 (62)	def.	Richmond 6.14 (50)	GIANTS Stadium (crowd: 5,500)	Report
Saturday, 25 July (1:05 pm)	North Melbourne 9.3 (57)	def. by	Carlton 9.10 (64)	Gabba (crowd: 3,655)	Report
Saturday, 25 July (3:35 pm)	Sydney 9.6 (60)	def.	Hawthorn 7.11 (53)	SCG (crowd: 4,264)	Report
Saturday, 25 July (7:10 pm)	Port Adelaide 6.8 (44)	def. by	St Kilda 12.1 (73)	Adelaide Oval (crowd: 16,727)	Report
Sunday, 26 July (12:35 pm)	Adelaide 8.11 (59)	def. by	Essendon 9.8 (62)	Adelaide Oval (crowd: 15,155)	Report
Sunday, 26 July (3:35 pm)	West Coast 18.3 (111)	def.	Collingwood 6.9 (45)	Optus Stadium (crowd: 24,824)	Report
Sunday, 26 July (6:10 pm)	Melbourne 7.7 (49)	def. by	Brisbane Lions 7.11 (53)	Metricon Stadium (crowd: 3,011)	Report
Monday, 27 July (6:10 pm)	Fremantle 2.4 (16)	def. by	Geelong 6.12 (48)	Optus Stadium (crowd: 20,251)	Report

=== Round 9 ===
	Round 9
Wednesday, 29 July (7:10 pm)	Western Bulldogs 7.7 (49)	def. by	Richmond 13.12 (90)	Metricon Stadium (crowd: 2,824)	Report
Thursday, 30 July (7:50 pm)	Melbourne 4.8 (32)	def. by	Port Adelaide 12.11 (83)	Gabba (crowd: 323)	Report
Friday, 31 July (3:40 pm)	Carlton 9.4 (58)	def. by	Hawthorn 14.5 (89)	Optus Stadium (crowd: 12,304)	Report
Friday, 31 July (8:10 pm)	Essendon 3.10 (28)	def. by	Brisbane Lions 14.7 (91)	Metricon Stadium (crowd: 4,860)	Report
Saturday, 1 August (2:35 pm)	North Melbourne 19.5 (119)	def.	Adelaide 7.8 (50)	Metricon Stadium (crowd: 522)	Report
Saturday, 1 August (5:10 pm)	St Kilda 15.11 (101)	def.	Sydney 6.12 (48)	Gabba (crowd: 2,978)	Report
Saturday, 1 August (6:10 pm)	West Coast 11.7 (73)	def.	Geelong 10.4 (64)	Optus Stadium (crowd: 26,211)	Report
Sunday, 2 August (3:35 pm)	Gold Coast 4.11 (35)	def. by	Greater Western Sydney 9.7 (61)	Metricon Stadium (crowd: 4,363)	Report
Sunday, 2 August (4:10 pm)	Fremantle 10.1 (61)	def.	Collingwood 7.7 (49)	Optus Stadium (crowd: 20,912)	Report
Essendon's score of 3.10 (28) was the lowest score conceded by the Brisbane Lions in their history.; St Kilda defeated Sydney for the first time since Round 9, 2012, ending a ten-match losing streak.

=== Round 10 ===
	Round 10
Monday, 3 August (6:40 pm)	Port Adelaide 8.7 (55)	def.	Western Bulldogs 5.12 (42)	Adelaide Oval (crowd: 14,159)	Report
Tuesday, 4 August (7:10 pm)	Richmond 12.10 (82)	def.	Brisbane Lions 4.17 (41)	Metricon Stadium (crowd: 5,651)	Report
Wednesday, 5 August (5:40 pm)	Geelong 13.12 (90)	def.	North Melbourne 9.3 (57)	Gabba (crowd: 2,282)	Report
Wednesday, 5 August (7:40 pm)	Adelaide 5.7 (37)	def. by	Melbourne 13.10 (88)	Adelaide Oval (crowd: 12,022)	Report
Thursday, 6 August (5:40 pm)	Collingwood 6.14 (50)	def.	Sydney 6.5 (41)	Gabba (crowd: 4,146)	Report
Thursday, 6 August (8:10 pm)	Gold Coast 11.8 (74)	def. by	St Kilda 12.6 (78)	Metricon Stadium (crowd: 3,095)	Report
Friday, 7 August (7:50 pm)	Essendon 8.7 (55)	def. by	Greater Western Sydney 8.11 (59)	Metricon Stadium (crowd: 1,178)	Report
	Bye; Carlton, Fremantle, Hawthorn, West Coast
The aggregate score of 0.4 (4) in first quarter of Essendon v Greater Western Sydney was the lowest-scoring opening quarter of any match since Round 1, 1965.

=== Round 11 ===
	Round 11
Saturday, 8 August (4:05 pm)	Port Adelaide 13.15 (93)	def.	Richmond 11.6 (72)	Adelaide Oval (crowd: 10,256)	Report
Saturday, 8 August (7:40 pm)	Brisbane Lions 14.12 (96)	def.	Western Bulldogs 11.6 (72)	Gabba (crowd: 11,061)	Report
Sunday, 9 August (1:35 pm)	West Coast 11.6 (72)	def.	Carlton 7.8 (50)	Optus Stadium (crowd: 19,092)	Report
Sunday, 9 August (5:40 pm)	Melbourne 13.14 (92)	def.	North Melbourne 5.5 (35)	Adelaide Oval (crowd: 2,172)	Report
Monday, 10 August (6:10 pm)	St Kilda 4.10 (34)	def. by	Geelong 14.9 (93)	Gabba (crowd: 3,903)	Report
Monday, 10 August (6:40 pm)	Fremantle 7.6 (48)	def.	Hawthorn 4.8 (32)	Optus Stadium (crowd: 18,512)	Report
Tuesday, 11 August (6:05 pm)	Adelaide 5.8 (38)	def. by	Collingwood 10.2 (62)	Adelaide Oval (crowd: 8,577)	Report
Wednesday, 12 August (7:10 pm)	Gold Coast 11.7 (73)	drew with	Essendon 11.7 (73)	Metricon Stadium (crowd: 4,303)	Report
	Bye; Greater Western Sydney, Sydney

=== Round 12 ===
	Round 12
Thursday, 13 August (6:10 pm)	Sydney 10.6 (66)	def.	Greater Western Sydney 3.7 (25)	Optus Stadium (crowd: 6,464)	Report
Friday, 14 August (7:50 pm)	Geelong 14.7 (91)	def.	Port Adelaide 4.7 (31)	Metricon Stadium (crowd: 3,378)	Report
Saturday, 15 August (2:35 pm)	North Melbourne 8.4 (52)	def. by	Brisbane Lions 7.11 (53)	Metricon Stadium (crowd: 2,722)	Report
Saturday, 15 August (5:10 pm)	Melbourne 16.4 (100)	def.	Collingwood 6.8 (44)	Gabba (crowd: 5,338)	Report
Saturday, 15 August (6:10 pm)	Fremantle 5.6 (36)	def. by	Carlton 5.10 (40)	Optus Stadium (crowd: 24,114)	Report
Sunday, 16 August (1:05 pm)	Western Bulldogs 16.15 (111)	def.	Adelaide 8.6 (54)	Metricon Stadium (crowd: 613)	Report
Sunday, 16 August (3:35 pm)	St Kilda 10.8 (68)	def.	Essendon 5.3 (33)	Gabba (crowd: 4,686)
Sunday, 16 August (4:10 pm)	West Coast 12.9 (81)	def.	Hawthorn 7.7 (49)	Optus Stadium (crowd: 22,780)
Monday, 17 August (7:10 pm)	Richmond 8.5 (53)	def.	Gold Coast 4.8 (32)	Gabba (crowd: 4,062)
Jack Newnes kicked a goal after the final siren to win the match for Carlton.

=== Round 13 ===
	Round 13 (Sir Doug Nicholls Round)
Friday, 21 August (7:20 pm)	Gold Coast 4.3 (27)	def. by	Carlton 7.18 (60)	TIO Stadium (crowd: 5,172)	Report
Saturday, 22 August (1:45 pm)	Western Bulldogs 12.8 (80)	def.	Melbourne 7.10 (52)	Metricon Stadium (crowd: 1,765)	Report
Saturday, 22 August (4:05 pm)	Port Adelaide 9.14 (68)	def.	Hawthorn 9.4 (58)	Adelaide Oval (crowd: 11,740)	Report
Saturday, 22 August (7:10 pm)	Essendon 10.1 (61)	def. by	Richmond 10.13 (73)	TIO Stadium (crowd: 5,401)	Report
Saturday, 22 August (6:10 pm)	Fremantle 7.8 (50)	def.	Sydney 2.7 (19)	Optus Stadium (crowd: 24,714)	Report
Sunday, 23 August (12:35 pm)	Adelaide 5.7 (37)	def. by	Geelong 9.11 (65)	Adelaide Oval (crowd: 10,431)	Report
Sunday, 23 August (3:35 pm)	Brisbane Lions 6.14 (50)	def.	St Kilda 7.6 (48)	Gabba (crowd: 13,750)	Report
Sunday, 23 August (4:10 pm)	West Coast 9.7 (61)	def.	Greater Western Sydney 7.7 (49)	Optus Stadium (crowd: 27,339)	Report
Monday, 24 August (7:10 pm)	Collingwood 10.5 (65)	def.	North Melbourne 5.5 (35)	Gabba (crowd: 2,443)	Report
Sydney's score of 2.7 (19) was its lowest in a game since Round 12, 1971 (as South Melbourne).

=== Round 14 ===
	Round 14
Thursday, 27 August (4:10 pm)	Hawthorn 10.11 (71)	def. by	Essendon 13.9 (87)	Adelaide Oval (crowd: 4,973)	Report
Thursday, 27 August (7:10 pm)	Richmond 14.4 (88)	def.	West Coast 9.7 (61)	Metricon Stadium (crowd: 3,628)	Report
Friday, 28 August (7:50 pm)	Western Bulldogs 9.7 (61)	def. by	Geelong 10.12 (72)	Metricon Stadium (crowd: 2,156)	Report
Saturday, 29 August (1:15 pm)	Port Adelaide 11.7 (73)	def.	Sydney 7.5 (47)	Adelaide Oval (crowd: 11,801)	Report
Saturday, 29 August (2:35 pm)	Fremantle 8.5 (53)	def. by	Greater Western Sydney 14.7 (91)	Optus Stadium (crowd: 24,406)	Report
Saturday, 29 August (7:10 pm)	Melbourne 8.4 (52)	def.	St Kilda 7.7 (49)	TIO Traeger Park (crowd: 1,917)	Report
Sunday, 30 August (3:35 pm)	Carlton 7.6 (48)	def. by	Collingwood 10.12 (72)	Gabba (crowd: 9,033)	Report
Sunday, 30 August (6:10 pm)	Gold Coast 12.19 (91)	def.	North Melbourne 4.4 (28)	Metricon Stadium (crowd: 3,353)	Report
	Bye; Adelaide, Brisbane Lions

=== Round 15 ===
	Round 15
Tuesday, 1 September (5:10 pm)	Hawthorn 7.6 (48)	def. by	Adelaide 12.11 (83)	Adelaide Oval (crowd: 6,191)	Report
Tuesday, 1 September (8:10 pm)	West Coast 9.6 (60)	def.	Essendon 6.9 (45)	Gabba (crowd: 1,932)	Report
Wednesday, 2 September (7:10 pm)	Richmond 8.8 (56)	def.	Fremantle 4.5 (29)	Metricon Stadium (crowd: 1,818)	Report
Thursday, 3 September (4:40 pm)	Sydney 10.7 (67)	def.	Melbourne 6.10 (46)	Cazalys Stadium (crowd: 3,199)	Report
Thursday, 3 September (7:10 pm)	Greater Western Sydney 6.12 (48)	def.	Carlton 5.9 (39)	Metricon Stadium (crowd: 1,469)	Report
Friday, 4 September (7:50 pm)	Brisbane Lions 6.6 (42)	def.	Collingwood 5.4 (34)	Gabba (crowd: 15,036)	Report
	Bye; Geelong, Gold Coast, North Melbourne, Port Adelaide, St Kilda, Western Bulldogs
Adelaide won its first game since Round 20, 2019, breaking a club record 16-game losing streak.

=== Round 16 ===
	Round 16
Saturday, 5 September (7:40 pm)	North Melbourne 6.6 (42)	def. by	Port Adelaide 11.12 (78)	Metricon Stadium (crowd: 592)	Report
Sunday, 6 September (1:05 pm)	St Kilda 11.14 (80)	def.	Hawthorn 9.12 (66)	Metricon Stadium (crowd: 2,740)	Report
Sunday, 6 September (3:35 pm)	Geelong 17.6 (108)	def.	Essendon 5.12 (42)	Gabba (crowd: 5,011)	Report
Sunday, 6 September (6:10 pm)	Western Bulldogs 6.13 (49)	def.	West Coast 7.5 (47)	Metricon Stadium (crowd: 532)	Report
Monday, 7 September (7:10 pm)	Melbourne 4.9 (33)	def. by	Fremantle 6.11 (47)	Cazalys Stadium (crowd: 3,279)	Report
Tuesday, 8 September (5:10 pm)	Adelaide 8.11 (59)	def.	Greater Western Sydney 7.5 (47)	Adelaide Oval (crowd: 12,436)	Report
Tuesday, 8 September (8:10 pm)	Carlton 8.9 (57)	def.	Sydney 8.4 (52)	Metricon Stadium (crowd: 1,580)	Report
Wednesday, 9 September (7:10 pm)	Brisbane Lions 13.10 (88)	def.	Gold Coast 6.7 (43)	Gabba (crowd: 11,292)	Report
	Bye; Collingwood, Richmond

=== Round 17 ===
	Round 17
Thursday, 10 September (7:10 pm)	St Kilda 6.14 (50)	def. by	West Coast 9.11 (65)	Gabba (crowd: 1,925)	Report
Friday, 11 September (7:50 pm)	Geelong 4.7 (31)	def. by	Richmond 7.15 (57)	Metricon Stadium (crowd: 7,061)	Report
Saturday, 12 September (2:10 pm)	North Melbourne 5.5 (35)	def. by	Fremantle 15.9 (99)	Metricon Stadium (crowd: 308)	Report
Saturday, 12 September (4:35 pm)	Port Adelaide 11.13 (79)	def.	Essendon 4.5 (29)	Adelaide Oval (crowd: 17,482)	Report
Saturday, 12 September (7:40 pm)	Greater Western Sydney 11.8 (74)	def. by	Melbourne 12.7 (79)	Gabba (crowd: 1,204)	Report
Sunday, 13 September (1:05 pm)	Carlton 8.8 (56)	def. by	Adelaide 10.12 (72)	Metricon Stadium (crowd: 2,735)	Report
Sunday, 13 September (3:05 pm)	Hawthorn 6.4 (40)	def. by	Western Bulldogs 11.10 (76)	Adelaide Oval (crowd: 2,625)	Report
Sunday, 13 September (6:10 pm)	Sydney 6.5 (41)	def. by	Brisbane Lions 11.7 (73)	Cazalys Stadium (crowd: 3,700)	Report
Monday, 14 September (7:10 pm)	Collingwood 10.8 (68)	def.	Gold Coast 6.10 (46)	Gabba (crowd: 2,896)	Report

=== Round 18 ===
	Round 18
Thursday, 17 September (7:10 pm)	North Melbourne 4.10 (34)	def. by	West Coast 7.7 (49)	Metricon Stadium (crowd: 724)	Report
Friday, 18 September (7:50 pm)	St Kilda 12.10 (82)	def.	Greater Western Sydney 3.12 (30)	Gabba (crowd: 1,528)	Report
Saturday, 19 September (2:10 pm)	Essendon 7.7 (49)	def. by	Melbourne 10.8 (68)	Metricon Stadium (crowd: 2,175)	Report
Saturday, 19 September (4:40 pm)	Adelaide 4.9 (33)	def. by	Richmond 12.5 (77)	Adelaide Oval (crowd: 17,710)	Report
Saturday, 19 September (7:40 pm)	Brisbane Lions 11.12 (78)	def.	Carlton 10.1 (61)	Gabba (crowd: 14,563)	Report
Sunday, 20 September (12:35 pm)	Hawthorn 17.6 (108)	def.	Gold Coast 8.9 (57)	Adelaide Oval (crowd: 2,136)	Report
Sunday, 20 September (3:35 pm)	Sydney 9.9 (63)	def. by	Geelong 10.9 (69)	Metricon Stadium (crowd: 2,798)	Report
Sunday, 20 September (6:10 pm)	Fremantle 6.8 (44)	def. by	Western Bulldogs 11.8 (74)	Cazalys Stadium (crowd: 3,114)	Report
Monday, 21 September (7:15 pm)	Collingwood 7.3 (45)	def. by	Port Adelaide 9.7 (61)	Gabba (crowd: 5,424)	Report
West Coast and North Melbourne negotiated an agreement under which North Melbourne would play its home fixture at Optus Stadium in Perth, in exchange for between $700,000 and $800,000. However, this was rejected by the AFL.

=== Season notes ===
- St Kilda qualified for the finals for the first time since 2011.
- Adelaide "won" its first wooden spoon.
- Port Adelaide won its fourth McClelland Trophy as the minor premiers and its first since 2004. They also finished on top of the ladder at the end of every round. This was last achieved by Essendon in 2000.

== Win/loss table ==
Team	1	2	3	4	5	6	7	8	9	10	11	12	13	14	15	16	17	18	F1	F2	F3	GF	Ladder
Adelaide	**Syd** **−3**	PA −75	GCS −53	BL −37	**Frem** **−20**	WCE −33	**StK** **−23**	**Ess** **−3**	NM −69	**Melb** **−51**	**Coll** **−24**	WB −57	**Geel** **−28**	X	Haw +35	**GWS** **+12**	Carl +16	**Rich** **−44**	X	X	X	X	18
Brisbane Lions	Haw −28	**Frem** **+12**	**WCE** **+30**	**Adel** **+37**	**PA** **+37**	Geel −27	GWS +20	Melb +4	Ess +63	Rich −41	**WB** **+24**	NM +1	**StK** **+2**	X	**Coll** **+8**	**GCS** **+45**	Syd +32	**Carl** **+17**	**Rich** **+15**	X	**Geel** **−40**	X	**2 (4)**
Carlton	Rich −24	**Melb** **−1**	Geel +2	Ess +1	**StK** **−18**	**WB** **+52**	**PA** **−3**	NM +7	**Haw** **−31**	X	WCE −22	Frem +4	GCS +33	**Coll** **−24**	GWS −9	**Syd** **+5**	**Adel** **−16**	BL −17	X	X	X	X	11
Collingwood	WB +52	**Rich**; **0**	**StK** **+44**	GWS −2	**Ess** **−15**	**Haw** **+32**	Geel +22	WCE −66	Frem −12	**Syd** **+9**	Adel +24	Melb −56	**NM** **+30**	Carl +24	BL −8	X	**GCS** **+22**	**PA** **−16**	WCE +1	Geel −68	X	X	**8 (6)**
Essendon	**Frem** **+6**	Syd +6	X	**Carl** **−1**	Coll +15	**NM** **+14**	**WB** **−42**	Adel +3	**BL** **−63**	**GWS** **−4**	GCS; 0	StK −35	**Rich** **−12**	Haw +16	WCE −15	Geel −66	PA −50	**Melb** **−19**	X	X	X	X	13
Fremantle	Ess −6	BL −12	**PA** **−29**	GCS −13	Adel +20	**StK** **+6**	**WCE** **−30**	**Geel** **−32**	**Coll** **+12**	X	**Haw** **+16**	**Carl** **−4**	**Syd** **+31**	**GWS** **−38**	Rich −27	Melb +14	NM +64	**WB** **−30**	X	X	X	X	12
Geelong	GWS −32	**Haw** **+61**	**Carl** **−2**	Melb +3	**GCS** **+37**	**BL** **+27**	**Coll** **−22**	Frem +32	WCE −9	**NM** **+33**	StK +59	**PA** **+60**	Adel +28	WB +11	X	**Ess** **+66**	**Rich** **−26**	Syd +6	PA −16	**Coll** **+68**	BL +40	Rich −31	**4 (2)**
Gold Coast	**PA** **−47**	**WCE** **+44**	**Adel** **+53**	**Frem** **+13**	Geel −37	Melb −17	Syd +32	**WB** **−5**	**GWS** **−26**	**StK** **−4**	**Ess**; **0**	Rich −21	**Carl** **−33**	**NM** **+63**	X	BL −45	Coll −22	Haw −51	X	X	X	X	14
Greater Western Sydney	**Geel** **+32**	**NM** **−20**	WB −24	**Coll** **+2**	**Haw** **+34**	PA −17	**BL** **−20**	**Rich** **+12**	GCS +26	Ess +4	X	Syd −41	WCE −12	Frem +38	**Carl** **+9**	Adel −12	**Melb** **−5**	StK −52	X	X	X	X	10
Hawthorn	**BL** **+28**	Geel −61	Rich +32	**NM** **+4**	GWS −34	Coll −32	**Melb** **−43**	Syd −7	Carl +31	X	Frem −16	WCE −32	PA −10	**Ess** **−16**	**Adel** **−35**	StK −14	**WB** **−36**	**GCS** **+51**	X	X	X	X	15
Melbourne	WCE −27	Carl +1	X	**Geel** **−3**	**Rich** **−27**	**GCS** **+17**	Haw +43	**BL** **−4**	**PA** **−51**	Adel +51	**NM** **+57**	**Coll** **+56**	WB −28	**StK** **+3**	Syd −21	**Frem** **−14**	GWS +5	Ess +19	X	X	X	X	9
North Melbourne	**StK** **+2**	GWS +20	**Syd** **−11**	Haw −4	WB −49	Ess −14	Rich −54	**Carl** **−7**	**Adel** **+69**	Geel −33	Melb −57	**BL** **−1**	Coll −30	GCS −63	X	**PA** **−36**	**Frem** **−64**	**WCE** **−15**	X	X	X	X	17
Port Adelaide	GCS +47	**Adel** **+75**	Frem +29	**WCE** **+48**	BL −37	**GWS** **+17**	Carl +3	**StK** **−29**	Melb +51	**WB** **+13**	**Rich** **+21**	Geel −60	**Haw** **+10**	**Syd** **+26**	X	NM +36	**Ess** **+50**	Coll +16	**Geel** **+16**	X	**Rich** **−6**	X	**1 (3)**
Richmond	**Carl** **+24**	Coll; 0	**Haw** **−32**	StK −26	Melb +27	**Syd** **+8**	**NM** **+54**	GWS −12	WB +41	**BL** **+41**	PA −21	**GCS** **+21**	Ess +12	**WCE** **+27**	**Frem** **+27**	X	Geel +26	Adel +44	BL −15	**StK** **+31**	PA +6	**Geel** **+31**	**3 (1)**
St Kilda	NM −2	**WB** **+39**	Coll −44	**Rich** **+26**	Carl +18	Frem −6	Adel +23	PA +29	**Syd** **+53**	GCS +4	**Geel** **−59**	**Ess** **+35**	BL −2	Melb −3	X	**Haw** **+14**	**WCE** **−15**	**GWS** **+52**	**WB** **+3**	Rich −31	X	X	**6 (5)**
Sydney	Adel +3	**Ess** **−6**	NM +11	**WB** **−28**	WCE −34	Rich −8	**GCS** **−32**	**Haw** **+7**	StK −53	Coll −9	X	**GWS** **+41**	Frem −31	PA −26	**Melb** **+21**	Carl −5	**BL** **+32**	**Geel** **−6**	X	X	X	X	16
West Coast	**Melb** **+27**	GCS −44	BL −30	PA −48	**Syd** **+34**	**Adel** **+33**	Frem +30	**Coll** **+66**	**Geel** **+9**	X	**Carl** **+22**	**Haw** **+32**	**GWS** **+12**	Rich −27	**Ess** **+15**	WB −2	StK +15	NM +15	**Coll** **−1**	X	X	X	**5 (7)**
Western Bulldogs	**Coll** **−52**	StK −39	**GWS** **+24**	Syd +28	**NM** **+49**	Carl −52	Ess +42	GCS +5	**Rich** **−41**	PA −13	BL −24	**Adel** **+57**	**Melb** **+28**	**Geel** **−11**	X	**WCE** **+2**	Haw +36	Frem +30	StK −3	X	X	X	**7 (8)**
Team	1	2	3	4	5	6	7	8	9	10	11	12	13	14	15	16	17	18	F1	F2	F3	GF	Ladder

+	Win	Qualified for finals
−	Loss	Eliminated

Bold – Home game
X – Bye
Opponent for round listed above margin

== Ladder ==
Pos	Team	Pld	W	L	D	PF	PA	PP	Pts	Qualification
1	Port Adelaide	17	14	3	0	1185	869	136.4	56	Finals series
2	Brisbane Lions	17	14	3	0	1184	948	124.9	56	Finals series
3	Richmond (P)	17	12	4	1	1135	874	129.9	50	Finals series
4	Geelong	17	12	5	0	1233	901	136.8	48	Finals series
5	West Coast	17	12	5	0	1095	936	117.0	48	Finals series
6	St Kilda	17	10	7	0	1159	997	116.2	40	Finals series
7	Western Bulldogs	17	10	7	0	1103	1034	106.7	40	Finals series
8	Collingwood	17	9	7	1	965	881	109.5	38	Finals series
9	Melbourne	17	9	8	0	1063	986	107.8	36	
10	Greater Western Sydney	17	8	9	0	1007	1053	95.6	32	
11	Carlton	17	7	10	0	1017	1078	94.3	28	
12	Fremantle	17	7	10	0	866	924	93.7	28	
13	Essendon	17	6	10	1	938	1185	79.2	26	
14	Gold Coast	17	5	11	1	996	1099	90.6	22	
15	Hawthorn	17	5	12	0	1004	1194	84.1	20	
16	Sydney	17	5	12	0	890	1077	82.6	20	
17	North Melbourne	17	3	14	0	858	1205	71.2	12	
18	Adelaide	17	3	14	0	826	1283	64.4	12	

Source: AFL
Rules for classification: 1) points; 2) percentage; 3) number of points for.
(P) Premiers

=== Ladder progression ===
- Numbers highlighted in green indicates the team finished the round inside the top 8.
- Numbers highlighted in blue indicates the team finished in first place on the ladder in that round.
- Numbers highlighted in red indicates the team finished in last place on the ladder in that round.
- Underlined numbers indicates the team did not play during that round, either due to a bye or a postponed game.
- Subscript numbers indicate ladder position at round's end.

Points by round
Team ╲ Round	1	2	3	4	5	6	7	8	9	10	11	12	13	14	15	16	17	18
Port Adelaide	4_{1}	8_{1}	12_{1}	16_{1}	16_{1}	20_{1}	24_{1}	24_{1}	28_{1}	32_{1}	36_{1}	36_{1}	40_{1}	44_{1}	44_{1}	48_{1}	52_{1}	56_{1}
Brisbane Lions	0_{15}	4_{11}	8_{5}	12_{3}	16_{2}	16_{3}	20_{2}	24_{2}	28_{2}	28_{3}	32_{2}	36_{2}	40_{2}	40_{3}	44_{2}	48_{2}	52_{2}	56_{2}
Richmond	4_{6}	6_{5}	6_{9}	6_{14}	10_{11}	14_{6}	18_{4}	18_{9}	22_{5}	26_{4}	26_{6}	30_{6}	34_{5}	38_{4}	42_{3}	42_{4}	46_{3}	50_{3}
Geelong	0_{14}	4_{7}	4_{10}	8_{6}	12_{3}	16_{2}	16_{5}	20_{3}	20_{6}	24_{5}	28_{3}	32_{3}	36_{3}	40_{2}	40_{4}	44_{3}	44_{4}	48_{4}
West Coast	4_{3}	4_{12}	4_{15}	4_{16}	8_{15}	12_{11}	16_{8}	20_{5}	24_{4}	24_{6}	28_{4}	32_{4}	36_{4}	36_{5}	40_{5}	40_{5}	44_{5}	48_{5}
St Kilda	0_{10}	4_{6}	4_{11}	8_{7}	12_{4}	12_{7}	16_{6}	20_{4}	24_{3}	28_{2}	28_{5}	32_{5}	32_{6}	32_{7}	32_{7}	36_{6}	36_{7}	40_{6}
Western Bulldogs	0_{17}	0_{18}	4_{16}	8_{13}	12_{8}	12_{12}	16_{9}	20_{6}	20_{8}	20_{9}	20_{11}	24_{10}	28_{8}	28_{10}	28_{10}	32_{9}	36_{8}	40_{7}
Collingwood	4_{2}	6_{4}	10_{2}	10_{5}	10_{10}	14_{5}	18_{3}	18_{8}	18_{10}	22_{8}	26_{7}	26_{7}	30_{7}	34_{6}	34_{6}	34_{7}	38_{6}	38_{8}
Melbourne	0_{16}	4_{14}	4_{14}	4_{15}	4_{17}	8_{15}	12_{12}	12_{13}	12_{15}	16_{12}	20_{10}	24_{8}	24_{9}	28_{8}	28_{9}	28_{10}	32_{9}	36_{9}
Greater Western Sydney	4_{5}	4_{8}	4_{12}	8_{10}	12_{7}	12_{10}	12_{13}	16_{12}	20_{7}	24_{7}	24_{8}	24_{9}	24_{11}	28_{9}	32_{8}	32_{8}	32_{10}	32_{10}
Carlton	0_{13}	0_{16}	4_{13}	8_{12}	8_{12}	12_{8}	12_{11}	16_{11}	16_{12}	16_{13}	16_{13}	20_{12}	24_{10}	24_{12}	24_{12}	28_{11}	28_{12}	28_{11}
Fremantle	0_{12}	0_{15}	0_{17}	0_{17}	4_{16}	8_{14}	8_{15}	8_{16}	12_{16}	12_{16}	16_{14}	16_{14}	20_{13}	20_{14}	20_{14}	24_{13}	28_{11}	28_{12}
Essendon	4_{7}	8_{3}	8_{4}	8_{8}	12_{5}	16_{4}	16_{10}	20_{7}	20_{9}	20_{10}	22_{9}	22_{11}	22_{12}	26_{11}	26_{11}	26_{12}	26_{13}	26_{13}
Gold Coast	0_{18}	4_{10}	8_{3}	12_{2}	12_{6}	12_{9}	16_{7}	16_{10}	16_{11}	16_{11}	18_{12}	18_{13}	18_{14}	22_{13}	22_{13}	22_{14}	22_{14}	22_{14}
Hawthorn	4_{4}	4_{13}	8_{8}	12_{4}	12_{9}	12_{13}	12_{14}	12_{15}	16_{13}	16_{14}	16_{15}	16_{16}	16_{15}	16_{15}	16_{16}	16_{16}	16_{16}	20_{15}
Sydney	4_{8}	4_{9}	8_{7}	8_{11}	8_{14}	8_{17}	8_{16}	12_{14}	12_{17}	12_{17}	12_{17}	16_{15}	16_{16}	16_{16}	20_{15}	20_{15}	20_{15}	20_{16}
North Melbourne	4_{9}	8_{2}	8_{6}	8_{9}	8_{13}	8_{16}	8_{17}	8_{17}	12_{14}	12_{15}	12_{16}	12_{17}	12_{17}	12_{17}	12_{17}	12_{17}	12_{17}	12_{17}
Adelaide	0_{11}	0_{17}	0_{18}	0_{18}	0_{18}	0_{18}	0_{18}	0_{18}	0_{18}	0_{18}	0_{18}	0_{18}	0_{18}	0_{18}	4_{18}	8_{18}	12_{18}	12_{18}

Source: AFL Tables

== Finals series ==
Qualifying and elimination finals
1 Oct, Adelaide Oval
1	Port Adelaide	9.4 (58)
4	Geelong	5.12 (42)
3 Oct, Optus Stadium
5	West Coast	11.9 (75)
8	Collingwood	12.4 (76)
3 Oct, Gabba
6	St Kilda	10.7 (67)
7	Western Bulldogs	9.10 (64)
2 Oct, Gabba
2	Brisbane Lions	10.9 (69)
3	Richmond	8.6 (54)

Semi-finals
10 Oct, Gabba
Geelong	15.10 (100)
Collingwood	5.2 (32)
9 Oct, Metricon Stadium
Richmond	12.8 (80)
St Kilda	6.13 (49)

Preliminary finals
16 Oct, Adelaide Oval
Port Adelaide	6.4 (40)
Richmond	6.10 (46)
17 Oct, Gabba
Brisbane Lions	6.6 (42)
Geelong	11.16 (82)

Grand final
24 Oct, Gabba
Richmond	12.9 (81)
Geelong	7.8 (50)

=== Week one ===
	Qualifying finals
QF1: Thursday, 1 October (7:10 pm)	Port Adelaide 9.4 (58)	def.	Geelong 5.12 (42)	Adelaide Oval (crowd: 22,755)	Report
QF2: Friday, 2 October (7:50 pm)	Brisbane Lions 10.9 (69)	def.	Richmond 8.6 (54)	Gabba (crowd: 22,104)	Report
The Brisbane Lions defeated Richmond for the first time since round 7, 2009, breaking a fifteen-game losing streak.

	Elimination finals
EF2: Saturday, 3 October (4:40 pm)	St Kilda 10.7 (67)	def.	Western Bulldogs 9.10 (64)	Gabba (crowd: 10,651)	Report
EF1: Saturday, 3 October (6:10 pm)	West Coast 11.9 (75)	def. by	Collingwood 12.4 (76)	Optus Stadium (crowd: 32,865)	Report

=== Week two ===
	Semi-finals
SF2: Friday, 9 October (6:50 pm)	Richmond 12.8 (80)	def.	St Kilda 6.13 (49)	Metricon Stadium (crowd: 13,778)	Report
SF1: Saturday, 10 October (6:40 pm)	Geelong 15.10 (100)	def.	Collingwood 5.2 (32)	Gabba (crowd: 21,396)	Report
Collingwood was held to its lowest three-quarter time score since round 6, 1900, scoring only 1.1 (7).

=== Week three ===
	Preliminary finals
PF1: Friday, 16 October (7:20 pm)	Port Adelaide 6.4 (40)	def. by	Richmond 6.10 (46)	Adelaide Oval (crowd: 24,292)	Report
PF2: Saturday, 17 October (6:40 pm)	Brisbane Lions 6.6 (42)	def. by	Geelong 11.16 (82)	Gabba (crowd: 29,121)	Report

=== Week four ===
	Grand final
Saturday, 24 October (6:30 pm)	Richmond 12.9 (81)	def.	Geelong 7.8 (50)	Gabba (crowd: 29,707)	Report
This was the first Grand Final in VFL/AFL history to be hosted outside Victoria, and the first not to be hosted at the MCG since 1991.; The crowd of 29,707 was the lowest for a VFL/AFL Grand Final since 1917.; Dustin Martin became the first player to win the Norm Smith Medal three times.

== Attendance ==
=== By club ===
In this table, home matches which were played behind closed doors are not included in the total count of home games, and therefore do not contribute to the home average.

2020 AFL Attendances
Club	Home Total	Home Games	Home Avg.
Adelaide	90,328	8	11,291
Brisbane Lions	85,182	8	10,648
Carlton	31,340	6	5,223
Collingwood	16,681	5	3,336
Essendon	22,834	6	3,806
Fremantle	162,147	10	16,215
Geelong	41,120	6	6,853
Gold Coast	31,428	8	3,929
Greater Western Sydney	17,852	7	2,550
Hawthorn	16,675	5	3,335
Melbourne	16,290	7	2,327
North Melbourne	8,523	6	1,421
Port Adelaide	85,223	9	9,469
Richmond	23,102	6	3,850
St Kilda	17,760	6	2,960
Sydney	27,367	8	3,421
West Coast	124,626	8	15,578
Western Bulldogs	7,890	5	1,578

== Club leadership ==
Club	Coach	Captain(s)	Vice-captain(s)	Leadership group	Ref.
Adelaide	Matthew Nicks	Rory Sloane		Matt Crouch, Tom Doedee, Tom Lynch, Brodie Smith	
Brisbane Lions	Chris Fagan	Dayne Zorko	Harris Andrews	Jarrod Berry, Darcy Gardiner, Ryan Lester, Jarryd Lyons, Stefan Martin, Hugh McCluggage, Lachie Neale	
Carlton	David Teague	Patrick Cripps; Sam Docherty		Ed Curnow, Liam Jones, Marc Murphy, Sam Walsh, Jacob Weitering	
Collingwood	Nathan Buckley	Scott Pendlebury	Taylor Adams, Steele Sidebottom, Jeremy Howe	Brodie Grundy, Jordan Roughead	
Essendon	John Worsfold	Dyson Heppell		Michael Hurley, Dylan Shiel, Devon Smith, David Zaharakis	
Fremantle	Justin Longmuir	Nat Fyfe		Reece Conca, Joel Hamling, David Mundy, Alex Pearce, Michael Walters	
Geelong	Chris Scott	Joel Selwood	Mark Blicavs, Patrick Dangerfield	Mitch Duncan, Mark O'Connor, Tom Stewart, Zach Tuohy	
Gold Coast	Stuart Dew	David Swallow; Jarrod Witts	Touk Miller	Sam Collins, Brayden Fiorini, Alex Sexton	
Greater Western Sydney	Leon Cameron	Stephen Coniglio	Josh Kelly	Jeremy Cameron, Matt de Boer, Toby Greene, Lachie Whitfield	
Hawthorn	Alastair Clarkson	Ben Stratton	Tom Mitchell, Jaeger O'Meara	Jack Gunston, Ben McEvoy, Liam Shiels, Isaac Smith	
Melbourne	Simon Goodwin	Max Gawn	Jack Viney		
North Melbourne	Rhyce Shaw	Jack Ziebell	Shaun Higgins, Robbie Tarrant	Ben Cunnington, Trent Dumont, Jamie Macmillan, Jasper Pittard, Jy Simpkin	
Port Adelaide	Ken Hinkley	Tom Jonas	Hamish Hartlett, Ollie Wines		
Richmond	Damien Hardwick	Trent Cotchin	Jack Riewoldt		
St Kilda	Brett Ratten	Jarryn Geary	Sebastian Ross	Jack Billings, Bradley Hill, Tim Membrey, Dylan Roberton	
Sydney	John Longmire	Josh Kennedy; Luke Parker; Dane Rampe		Lance Franklin, Callum Mills	
West Coast	Adam Simpson	Luke Shuey	Josh Kennedy, Jeremy McGovern	Jack Darling, Andrew Gaff, Nic Naitanui, Elliot Yeo	
Western Bulldogs	Luke Beveridge	Marcus Bontempelli		Josh Dunkley, Jason Johannisen, Mitch Wallis, Easton Wood	

== Awards ==
=== Major awards ===
- The Norm Smith Medal was awarded to Richmond's Dustin Martin, becoming the second player to do so in consecutive seasons.
- The Brownlow Medal was awarded to the Brisbane Lions' Lachie Neale;
- The Leigh Matthews Trophy was awarded to the Brisbane Lions' Lachie Neale.
- The Coleman Medal was awarded to Geelong's Tom Hawkins.
- The Goal of the Year was awarded to Collingwood's Josh Daicos.
- The Mark of the Year was awarded to Carlton's Sam Walsh.
- The AFL Rising Star was awarded to Fremantle's Caleb Serong.

=== Leading Goalkickers ===
1	Led the goalkicking at the end of the round
1	Led the goalkicking at the end of the home-and-away season
1_{1}	Subscript indicates the player's goal tally to that point of the season
–	Did not play during that round
X	Had a bye during that round

#	Player	Club	Home-and-away season (Coleman Medal)																		Finals series				Total	Games	Average
#	Player	Club	1	2	3	4	5	6	7	8	9	10	11	12	13	14	15	16	17	18	F1	F2	F3	GF	Total	Games	Average
1	Tom Hawkins	Geelong	2_{2}	0_{2}	2_{4}	1_{5}	3_{8}	3_{11}	0_{11}	3_{14}	2_{16}	3_{19}	5_{24}	6_{30}	3_{33}	2_{35}	X_{35}	4_{39}	1_{40}	2_{42}	0_{42}	4_{46}	2_{48}	1_{49}	49	21	2.33
2	Josh J. Kennedy	West Coast	0_{0}	1_{1}	1_{2}	4_{6}	0_{6}	1_{7}	4_{11}	7_{18}	4_{22}	X_{22}	2_{24}	3_{27}	1_{28}	0_{28}	-_{28}	2_{30}	1_{31}	0_{31}	3_{34}				34	17	2.00
2	Charlie Dixon	Port Adelaide	-_{0}	3_{3}	2_{5}	6_{11}	0_{11}	1_{12}	3_{15}	1_{16}	1_{17}	2_{19}	2_{21}	0_{21}	2_{23}	4_{27}	X_{27}	2_{29}	2_{31}	1_{32}	1_{33}	X_{33}	1_{34}		34	18	1.89
4	Jack Riewoldt	Richmond	3_{3}	0_{3}	0_{3}	1_{4}	1_{5}	1_{6}	1_{7}	1_{8}	1_{9}	4_{13}	3_{16}	2_{18}	2_{20}	1_{21}	1_{22}	X_{22}	4_{26}	2_{28}	2_{30}	0_{30}	1_{31}	2_{33}	33	21	1.57
5	Tom Lynch	Richmond	0_{0}	3_{3}	1_{4}	2_{6}	3_{9}	1_{10}	1_{11}	0_{11}	2_{13}	3_{16}	1_{17}	2_{19}	2_{21}	3_{24}	3_{27}	X_{27}	1_{28}	-_{28}	-_{28}	2_{30}	1_{31}	1_{32}	32	19	1.68
6	Charlie Cameron	Brisbane Lions	2_{2}	4_{6}	1_{7}	2_{9}	1_{10}	1_{11}	2_{13}	2_{15}	4_{19}	1_{20}	0_{20}	0_{20}	1_{21}	X_{20}	0_{20}	2_{23}	2_{25}	1_{26}	3_{29}	X_{29}	2_{31}		31	19	1.63
6	Jack Gunston	Hawthorn	0_{0}	2_{2}	2_{4}	0_{4}	3_{7}	1_{8}	3_{11}	1_{12}	3_{15}	X_{15}	1_{16}	2_{18}	-_{18}	2_{20}	3_{23}	1_{24}	3_{27}	4_{31}					31	16	1.94
8	Jack Darling	West Coast	1_{1}	1_{2}	1_{3}	0_{3}	2_{5}	2_{7}	2_{9}	1_{10}	2_{12}	X_{12}	2_{14}	2_{14}	3_{17}	3_{20}	2_{22}	0_{22}	2_{24}	1_{25}	3_{28}				30	18	1.67
9	Dan Butler	St Kilda	0_{0}	2_{2}	2_{4}	3_{7}	2_{9}	1_{10}	3_{13}	2_{15}	2_{17}	4_{21}	0_{21}	1_{22}	2_{24}	0_{24}	X_{24}	1_{25}	1_{26}	1_{27}	1_{28}	1_{29}			29	19	1.53
9	Matt Taberner	Fremantle	1_{1}	2_{3}	2_{5}	1_{6}	1_{7}	2_{9}	2_{11}	1_{12}	4_{16}	X_{16}	2_{18}	3_{21}	2_{23}	2_{25}	1_{26}	0_{26}	3_{29}	-_{29}					29	16	1.81
Other end-of-round leaders
	Tom Papley	Sydney	1_{1}	3_{4}	2_{6}	4_{10}	1_{11}	2_{13}	2_{15}	4_{19}	1_{20}	1_{21}	X_{21}	0_{21}	0_{21}	1_{22}	0_{22}	0_{22}	2_{24}	2_{26}					26	17	1.53

Source: AFL Tables

=== Player milestones ===
Name	Club	Milestone	Round
Rory Sloane	Adelaide	200 AFL games	Round 1
Patrick Dangerfield	Geelong	250 AFL games	Round 2
Shaun Atley	North Melbourne	200 AFL games	Round 3
Andrew Gaff	West Coast	200 AFL games	Round 3
Grant Birchall	Brisbane Lions	250 AFL games	Round 3
Josh P. Kennedy	Sydney	250 AFL games	Round 4
Brad Ebert	Port Adelaide	250 AFL games	Round 4
Jack Darling	West Coast	200 AFL games	Round 4
Lewis Jetta	West Coast	200 AFL games	Round 4
Luke Parker	Sydney	200 AFL games	Round 5
Gary Ablett Jr.	Geelong	350 AFL games	Round 5
Joel Selwood	Geelong	300 AFL games	Round 5
Jarrod Harbrow	Gold Coast	250 AFL games	Round 6
Josh J. Kennedy	West Coast	250 AFL games	Round 7
Jack Gunston	Hawthorn	200 AFL games	Round 8
Mitch Robinson	Brisbane Lions	200 AFL games	Round 9
Paddy Ryder	St Kilda	250 AFL games	Round 10
Ben Stratton	Hawthorn	200 AFL games	Round 13
Tom Rockliff	Port Adelaide	200 AFL games	Round 13
Taylor Walker	Adelaide	200 AFL games	Round 13
Cale Hooker	Essendon	200 AFL games	Round 15
Shane Mumford	Greater Western Sydney	200 AFL games	Round 15
Jarryn Geary	St Kilda	200 AFL games	Round 16
Zach Tuohy	Geelong	200 AFL games	Round 17
Todd Goldstein	North Melbourne	250 AFL games	Round 17
Matt de Boer	Greater Western Sydney	200 AFL games	Round 17
Daniel Talia	Adelaide	200 AFL games	Round 18
Trent Cotchin	Richmond	250 AFL games	Preliminary Final
Tom Hawkins	Geelong	600 AFL goals	Semi-final

=== Best and fairest ===
Club	Award name	Player	Times won
Adelaide	Malcolm Blight Medal	Reilly O'Brien	1
Brisbane Lions	Merrett–Murray Medal	Lachie Neale	2
Carlton	John Nicholls Medal	Jacob Weitering	1
Collingwood	Copeland Trophy	Taylor Adams	1
Essendon	W. S. Crichton Medal	Jordan Ridley	1
Fremantle	Doig Medal	Luke Ryan	1
Geelong	Carji Greeves Medal	Cameron Guthrie	1
Gold Coast	Club Champion	Sam Collins	1
Greater Western Sydney	Kevin Sheedy Medal	Nick Haynes	1
Greater Western Sydney	Kevin Sheedy Medal	Lachie Whitfield	2
Hawthorn	Peter Crimmins Medal	Jack Gunston	1
Melbourne	Keith 'Bluey' Truscott Trophy	Christian Petracca	1
North Melbourne	Syd Barker Medal	Luke McDonald	1
Port Adelaide	John Cahill Medal	Darcy Byrne-Jones	1
Richmond	Jack Dyer Medal	Jayden Short	1
St Kilda	Trevor Barker Award	Jack Steele	1
Sydney	Bob Skilton Medal	Jake Lloyd	2
West Coast	John Worsfold Medal	Nic Naitanui	1
Western Bulldogs	Charles Sutton Medal	Caleb Daniel	1

== Coach changes ==
Outgoing coach	Club	Date	Notes	Incoming coach
John Worsfold	Essendon	17 September 2019	Stepped down at the conclusion of the club's 2020 season as part of a succession plan.	Ben Rutten
Rhyce Shaw	North Melbourne	22 October 2020	Stepped down at the conclusion of the club's 2020 season due to personal health issues.	David Noble
