= 2017 Richmond Football Club season =

Richmond Football Club
2017 season
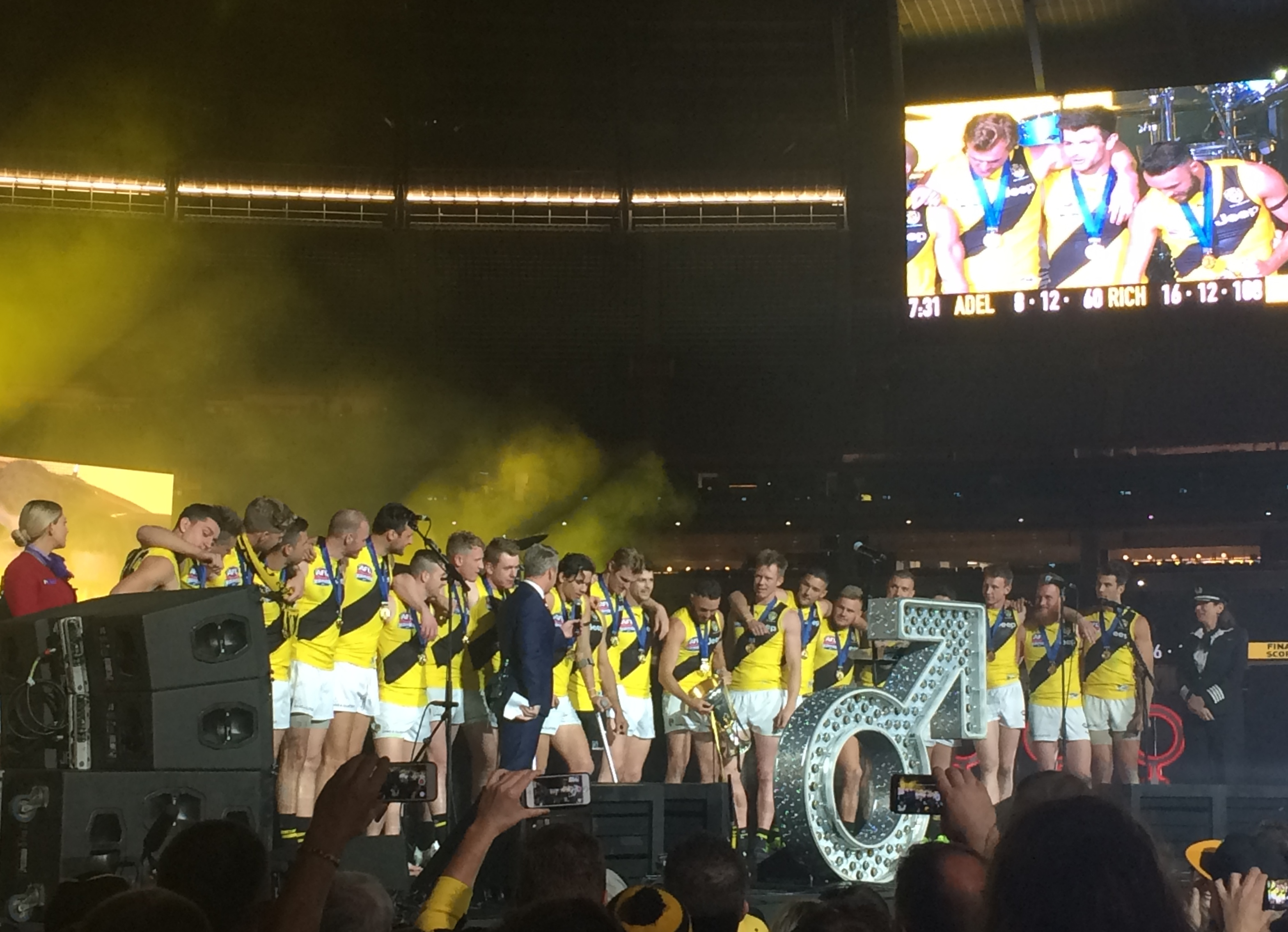
- Players celebrating on stage after winning the 2017 AFL Grand Final
- President: Peggy O'Neal^{(4th season)}
- Coach: Damien Hardwick^{(8th season)}
- Captains: Trent Cotchin^{(5th season)}
- Home ground: MCG
- Pre-season: (2-1)
- AFL season: 3rd^{(15-7)}
- Finals series: 1st^{(3-0)}
- Best and fairest: Dustin Martin
- Leading goalkicker: Jack Riewoldt^{(54)}
- Highest home attendance: 85,657^{(Round 5 vs. Melbourne)}
- Lowest home attendance: 28,188^{(Round 17 vs. Brisbane Lions)}
- Average home attendance: 55,958^{(▲14,403 / ▲34.66%)}
- Club membership: 75,777^{(▲391 / ▲0.54%)}

The 2017 season was the 110th season in which the Richmond Football Club participated in the VFL/AFL. It ended with Richmond the premiers of the competition, the first time they had achieved it since 1980.

== 2016 off-season list changes ==
=== Retirements and delistings ===
Player	Reason	Club games	Career games	Ref
Troy Chaplin	Retired	75	215	
Reece McKenzie	Retired	0	0	
Andrew Moore	Delisted	5	60	
Liam McBean	Delisted	5	5	
Adam Marcon	Delisted	2	2	
Chris Yarran	Delisted	0	119	

=== Free agency ===
Date	Player	Free agent type	Former club	New club	Compensation	Ref
10 October	Ty Vickery	Restricted	Richmond	Hawthorn	2nd round	

=== Trades ===
Date	Gained	Lost	Trade partner	Ref
19 October	Dion Prestia	Pick 6	Gold Coast	
19 October	Pick 24	2017 2nd round pick	Gold Coast	
19 October	Toby Nankervis	Pick 46	Sydney	
20 October	Josh Caddy	Pick 24	Geelong	
20 October	Pick 56	Pick 64	Geelong	
20 October	2017 1st round pick (via Geelong)	Brett Deledio	Greater Western Sydney	
20 October	2017 3rd round pick	Brett Deledio	Greater Western Sydney	

=== National draft ===
Round	Overall pick	Player	State	Position	Team from	League from	Ref
2	29	Shai Bolton	WA	Forward / midfielder	South Fremantle	WAFL	
4	53	Jack Graham	SA	Midfielder	North Adelaide	SANFL	
5	72	Ryan Garthwaite	VIC	Tall defender	Murray Bushrangers	TAC Cup	

=== Rookie draft ===
Round	Overall pick	Player	State	Position	Team from	League from	Ref
1	6	Tyson Stengle	SA	Small forward	Woodville-West Torrens	SANFL	

== 2017 squad ==
Richmond Football Club
Senior list		Rookie list	Coaching staff
1 Nick Vlastuin; 2 Dylan Grimes; 3 Dion Prestia; 4 Dustin Martin; 5 Brandon Ellis; 6 Shaun Grigg; 7 Ben Lennon; 8 Jack Riewoldt (vc); 9 Trent Cotchin (c); 10 Shane Edwards; 11 Jake Batchelor; 12 David Astbury; 14 Bachar Houli; 15 Jayden Short; 16 Shaun Hampson; 17 Daniel Rioli; 18 Alex Rance (vc); 20 Ivan Maric; 21 Jacob Townsend; 22 Josh Caddy	23 Kane Lambert; 24 Ben Griffiths; 25 Toby Nankervis; 26 Anthony Miles; 27 Sam Lloyd; 28 Taylor Hunt; 29 Shai Bolton; 30 Reece Conca; 31 Oleg Markov; 32 Corey Ellis; 33 Kamdyn McIntosh; 34 Jack Graham; 35 Nathan Broad; 37 Connor Menadue; 38 Steven Morris; 39 Nathan Drummond; 40 Dan Butler; 42 Ryan Garthwaite; 43 Todd Elton	36 Callum Moore; 41 Mabior Chol; 44 Tyson Stengle; 46 Jason Castagna; 47 Ivan Soldo (B)	Head coach: Damien Hardwick; Assistant coaches: Justin Leppitsch (forwards); Blake Caracella (midfield spread); Andrew McQualter (midfield stoppage); Ben Rutten (backline); Craig McRae (development (forwards)/VFL coach); Xavier Clarke (development (midfield)); Ryan Ferguson (development (backline)); Legend: (c) Captain(s); (vc) Vice-captain(s); Upgraded rookie; (B) Category B rookie; Updated: 12 May 2017; Source(s): Playing list, Coaching staff

== 2017 season ==
=== Pre-season ===
Match	Date	Score	Opponent	Opponent's score	Result	Home/away	Venue	Attendance
1	Friday 24 February, 7:40pm	0.14.8 (92)	Adelaide	0.10.13 (73)	Won by 19 points	Home	Etihad Stadium	7,262
2	Sunday 5 March, 4:10pm	0.11.13 (79)	Port Adelaide	0.7.9 (51)	Won by 28 points	Away	Malseed Park, Mount Gambier	4,649
3	Saturday 11 March, 1:10pm	0.16.11 (107)	Collingwood	1.15.15 (114)	Lost by 7 points	Home	Ted Summerton Reserve, Moe	5,701

=== Home and away season ===
Round	Date	Score	Opponent	Opponent's score	Result	Home/away	Venue	Attendance	Ladder
1	Thursday, 23 March 7:20pm	20.12 (132)	Carlton	14.5 (89)	Won by 43 points	Away	MCG	73,137	3rd
2	Thursday, 30 March 7:20pm	14.15 (99)	Collingwood	11.14 (80)	Won by 19 points	Home	MCG	58,236	3rd
3	Saturday, 8 April 2:10pm	11.10 (76)	West Coast	8.17 (65)	Won by 11 points	Home	MCG	42,523	2nd
4	Sunday, 16 April 4:40pm	17.17 (119)	Brisbane Lions	10.7 (67)	Won by 52 points	Away	The Gabba	21,669	3rd
5	Monday 24 April 7:25pm	12.16 (88)	Melbourne	11.9 (75)	Won by 13 points	Home	MCG	85,657	3rd
6	Sunday, 30 April 4:10pm	10.4 (64)	Adelaide	21.14 (140)	Lost by 76 points	Away	Adelaide Oval	51,069	4th
7	Saturday, 6 May 7:25pm	11.9 (75)	Western Bulldogs	11.14 (80)	Lost by 5 points	Away	Etihad Stadium	46,387	6th
8	Sunday, 14 May 1:10pm	10.10 (70)	Fremantle	10.12 (72)	Lost by 2 points	Home	MCG	31,200	7th
9	Saturday 20 May 4:35pm	10.15 (75)	Greater Western Sydney	11.12 (78)	Lost by 3 points	Away	Spotless Stadium	10,677	7th
10	Saturday, 27 May 7:25pm	11.15 (81)	Essendon	10.6 (66)	Won by 15 points	Home	MCG	85,656	5th
11	Saturday 3 June, 7:25pm	14.17 (101)	North Melbourne	9.12 (66)	Won by 35 points	Away	Etihad Stadium	36,100	4th
12	BYE								4th
13	Saturday 17 June, 1:45pm	10.11 (71)	Sydney	12.8 (80)	Lost by 9 points	Home	MCG	58,721	6th
14	Sunday 25 June, 3:20pm	11.18 (84)	Carlton	8.10 (58)	Won by 26 points	Home	MCG	64,448	6th
15	Saturday 1 July, 7:10pm	11.10 (76)	Port Adelaide	8.15 (63)	Won by 13 points	Away	Adelaide Oval	39,979	4th
16	Saturday 8 July, 7:25pm	10.11 (71)	St Kilda	21.12 (138)	Lost by 67 points	Away	Etihad Stadium	47,514	6th
17	Sunday 16 July, 1:10pm	16.16 (112)	Brisbane Lions	12.9 (81)	Won by 31 points	Home	Etihad Stadium	28,188	5th
18	Sunday 23 July, 1:10pm	9.10 (64)	Greater Western Sydney	6.9 (45)	Won by 19 points	Home	MCG	33,467	4th
19	Saturday 29 July, 7:25pm	14.14 (98)	Gold Coast	10.5 (65)	Won by 33 points	Away	Metricon Stadium	16,207	4th
20	Sunday 6 August, 3:20pm	13.15 (93)	Hawthorn	9.10 (64)	Won by 29 points	Home	MCG	58,342	3rd
21	Saturday 12 August, 2:10pm	9.12 (66)	Geelong	11.14 (80)	Lost by 14 points	Away	Kardinia Park	32,266	4th
22	Sunday 20 August, 2:40pm	25.5 (155)	Fremantle	7.9 (51)	Won by 104 points	Away	Domain Stadium	34,204	4th
23	Sunday 27 August, 3:20pm	19.8 (122)	St Kilda	12.9 (81)	Won by 41 points	Home	MCG	69,104	3rd

=== Finals ===
Match	Date	Score	Opponent	Opponent's Score	Result	Home/Away	Venue	Attendance
Qualifying final	Friday 8 September, 7:50pm	13.13 (91)	Geelong	5.10 (40)	Won by 51 points	Away	MCG	95,028
Preliminary final	Saturday 23 September, 4:45pm	15.13 (103)	Greater Western Sydney	9.13 (67)	Won by 36 points	Home	MCG	94,258
Grand final	Saturday 30 September, 2:30pm	16.12 (108)	Adelaide	8.12 (60)	Won by 48 points	Away	MCG	100,021

== Ladder ==
Pos	Team	Pld	W	L	D	PF	PA	PP	Pts	Qualification
1	Adelaide	22	15	6	1	2415	1776	136.0	62	2017 finals
2	Geelong	22	15	6	1	2134	1818	117.4	62	2017 finals
3	Richmond (P)	22	15	7	0	1992	1684	118.3	60	2017 finals
4	Greater Western Sydney	22	14	6	2	2081	1812	114.8	60	2017 finals
5	Port Adelaide	22	14	8	0	2168	1671	129.7	56	2017 finals
6	Sydney	22	14	8	0	2093	1651	126.8	56	2017 finals
7	Essendon	22	12	10	0	2135	2004	106.5	48	2017 finals
8	West Coast	22	12	10	0	1964	1858	105.7	48	2017 finals
9	Melbourne	22	12	10	0	2035	1934	105.2	48	
10	Western Bulldogs	22	11	11	0	1857	1913	97.1	44	
11	St Kilda	22	11	11	0	1925	1986	96.9	44	
12	Hawthorn	22	10	11	1	1864	2055	90.7	42	
13	Collingwood	22	9	12	1	1944	1963	99.0	38	
14	Fremantle	22	8	14	0	1607	2160	74.4	32	
15	North Melbourne	22	6	16	0	1983	2264	87.6	24	
16	Carlton	22	6	16	0	1594	2038	78.2	24	
17	Gold Coast	22	6	16	0	1756	2311	76.0	24	
18	Brisbane Lions	22	5	17	0	1877	2526	74.3	20	

Source: AFL
Rules for classification: 1) points; 2) percentage; 3) number of points for.
(P) Premiers

== Awards ==
=== League awards ===
==== All-Australian team ====
	Player	Position	Appearance
Named	Alex Rance	Full Back	4th
Named	Dustin Martin	Centre	2nd

==== Brownlow Medal tally ====
Player	3 vote games	2 vote games	1 vote games	Total votes	Place
Dustin Martin	11	0	3	36	1st
Trent Cotchin	0	3	2	8	51st
Alex Rance	0	2	4	8	51st
Shaun Grigg	1	2	0	7	57th
Jack Riewoldt	1	1	1	6	66th
Dion Prestia	0	2	1	5	77th
Josh Caddy	1	0	0	3	106th
Kane Lambert	0	1	0	2	132nd
Toby Nankervis	0	1	0	2	132nd
Jacob Townsend	0	0	1	1	162nd
Bachar Houli	0	0	1	1	162nd
Brandon Ellis	0	0	1	1	162nd
Total	14	12	14	80	-

==== Rising Star ====
Nominations:

Round	Player	Ref
11	Dan Butler	
19	Jason Castagna	

==== 22 Under 22 team ====
	Player	Position	Appearance
Named	Daniel Rioli	Interchange	1st
Nominated	Dan Butler	-	-

=== Club awards ===
==== Jack Dyer Medal ====
Position	Player	Votes	Medal
1st	Dustin Martin	89	Jack Dyer Medal
2nd	Alex Rance	80	Jack Titus Medal
3rd	Kane Lambert	76	Maurie Fleming Medal
4th	Trent Cotchin	72	Fred Swift Medal
5th	Dylan Grimes	69	Kevin Bartlett Medal
6th	Shaun Grigg	58	
7th	Jack Riewoldt	57	
8th	Bachar Houli	56	
8th	Dan Butler	56	
10th	Dion Prestia	52	

==== Michael Roach Medal ====
Position	Player	Goals
1st	Jack Riewoldt	54
2nd	Dustin Martin	37
3rd	Dan Butler	30
4th	Jason Castagna	26
5th	Daniel Rioli	25

== Reserves ==
The 2017 season marked the fourth consecutive year the Richmond Football club ran a stand-alone reserves team in the Victorian Football League (VFL). Richmond senior and rookie-listed players who were not selected to play in the AFL side were eligible to play for the team alongside a small squad of VFL-only listed players.

The team qualified for their first final series since being formed in 2014 and subsequently won final's against Collingwood, Casey and Box Hill to qualify for their first stand alone reserves grade grand final since 1997. They placed runners up after losing 11.8 (74) to 10.10 (70) to Port Melbourne.

Senior listed player Jacob Townsend won the J. J. Liston Trophy as the competition's best and fairest player.

=== Playing squad ===
Richmond Football Club (reserves)
Playing list		Coaching staff
51 Sam Darley (c); 52 Anthony Scott; 53 Hugh Beasley; 54 Jacob Ballard; 55 Ryan Bathie; 57 Brandon Wood; 58 Jake Aarts; 59 Ash Morris; 60 Tom Langford; 61 James Fletcher; 62 Jayden Cass; 63 Jack Holden	64 Thomas Silvestro; 67 Brenton Credlin; 69 Shaun Mannagh; 74 Tyson Kruse; 75 Lachlan McKenzie; 76 Alex Harnett; 78 Daniel Coffield; 79 Billy Coates; 80 Antony Forato; 81 Danko Bzenic; 86 Zak McCubbin; 88 Max O'Sullivan	Head coach: Craig McRae; Assistant coaches: Tom Hunter (forwards); Xavier Clarke (midfield); Ryan Ferguson (backline); Ben Waite (midfield stoppage); Marc Sophoulis (development); Legend: (c) Captain(s); (vc) Vice-captain(s); Updated: 15 March 2017; Source(s): Playing list, Coaching staff
