= Jason Castagna =

Australian rules footballer (born 1996)

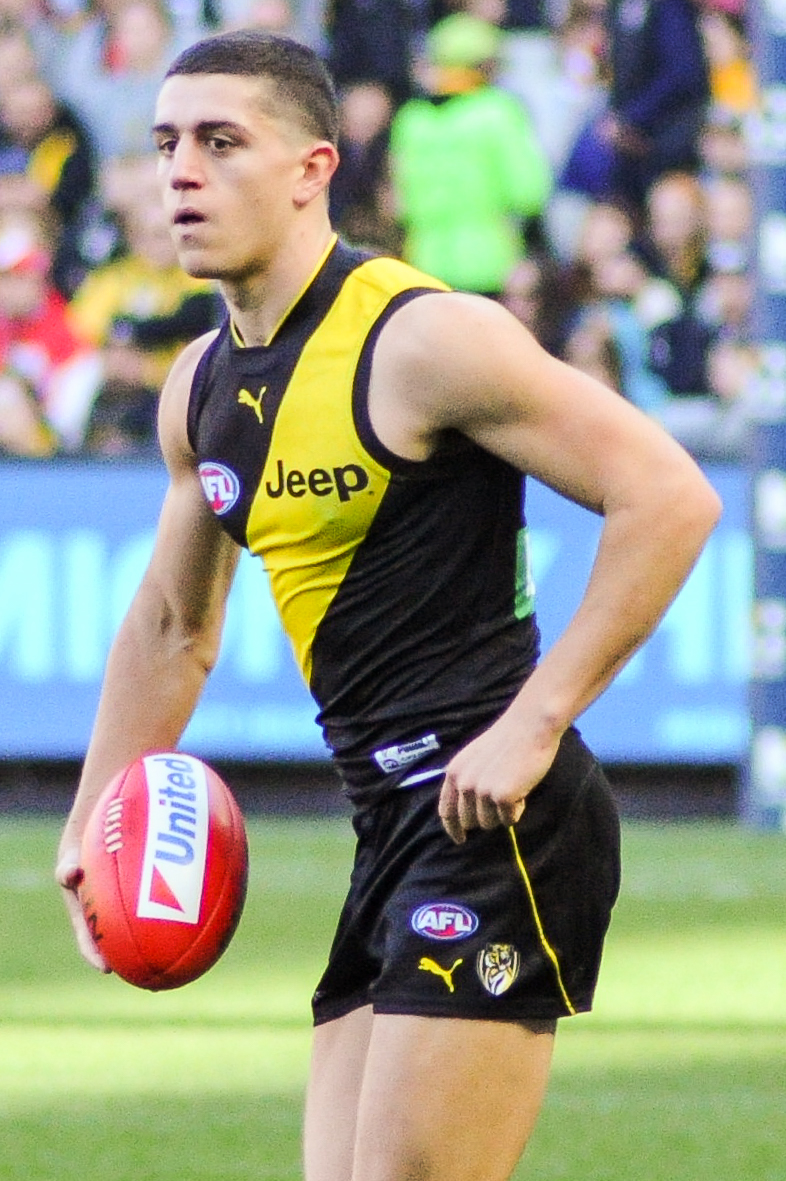
- Castagna with Richmond in June 2017

Personal information
- Nickname: George
- Born: 12 July 1996 (age 30)
- Original team: Northern Knights (TAC Cup)/Marcellin College
- Draft: No. 29, 2015 rookie draft: Richmond
- Debut: Round 6, 2016, Richmond vs. Port Adelaide, at MCG
- Height: 181 cm (5 ft 11 in)
- Weight: 80 kg (176 lb)
- Position: Small forward

Playing career^{1}
Years	Club	Games (Goals)
2015–2022	Richmond	134 (127)
- ^{1} Playing statistics correct to the end of 2022 season.

Career highlights
- 3× AFL premiership player: 2017, 2019, 2020; AFL Rising Star nominee: 2017

Jason Castagna (/kæstænjɑː/ ka-stan-ya; born 12 July 1996) is a former professional Australian rules football player for the Richmond Football Club in the Australian Football League (AFL). He is a triple premiership player with Richmond. Castagna announced his retirement on 27 February 2023 effective immediately.

== Early life and junior football ==
Castagna spent his teenage years in Kangaroo Ground, 26 kilometres north-east of Melbourne. He played junior club football with Warrandyte and played high school football at Marcellin College in Melbourne's east.

In 2013, Castagna was selected to play with the Northern Knights in the TAC Cup. He played ten matches with an average of nine disposals per match. He returned to the Knights in 2014, playing nine matches and averaging 17 disposals.

Castagna represented the Victorian Metro side at the National Under-18 Championships in 2014. He recorded an average of 14 disposals in five matches played that year.

In the 2014 draft combine, Castagna recorded a beep test score of 15.2; good for equal sixth best in his class.

== AFL career ==
=== 2015 season ===
Castagna was drafted with Richmond's second pick and the 29th selection overall in the 2015 Rookie Draft.

Castagna began the 2015 season playing as a rebounding defender with Richmond's reserves side in the VFL. He was upgraded to the club's senior list in August, following the early retirement of veteran midfielder Nathan Foley. Though strong form placed him close to a senior call-up at stages, a late season injury would ensure he did not make his AFL debut in 2015.

=== 2016 season ===
Castagna was again promoted to the senior list in 2016, filling the last of the club's free senior list spots on the eve of the season. He was named as an emergency in the club's round 6 match against Port Adelaide, but was called to play when wingman Kamdyn McIntosh withdrew due to injury He recorded 11 disposals on debut. He played again the next week in a loss to Hawthorn but was dropped the following week. Castagna made his return to the side in round 16, playing as a forward and recording 19 disposals and his first two career goals. He finished the season having played five games with an average of 14.8 disposals per game.

=== 2017 season ===
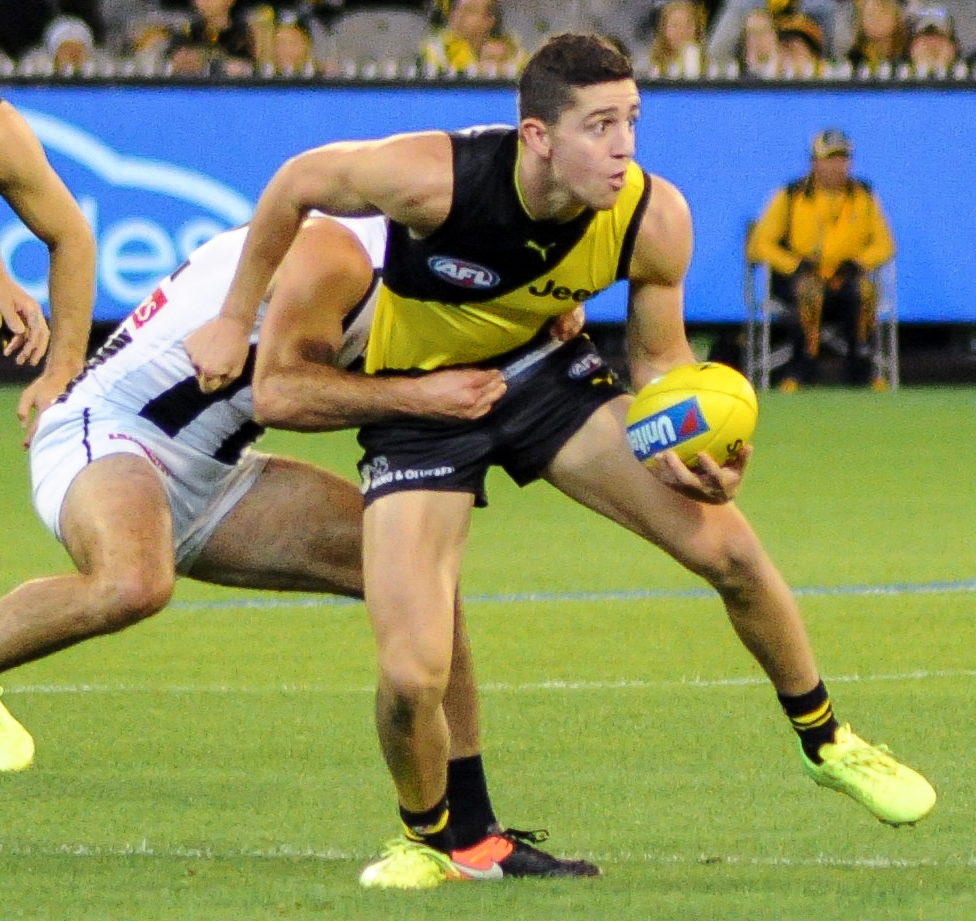
Castagna handballs during play in round 2 of the 2017 season

In March 2017, Castagna was again upgraded to Richmond's senior list. He was immediately impactful, playing in the club's round 1 victory against Carlton, kicking two goals and recording 20 disposals. In round 4 he kicked a career-high four goals in Richmond's win over the Brisbane Lions. Castagna, along with forward-line companions Daniel Rioli and Dan Butler, played a key role in Richmond's five game unbeaten start to the 2017 season. After five rounds the small-forward trio had combined for 23 goals (Castagna with eight) and 44 tackles (18 for Castagna). At the mid-season bye, Castagna was one of only 11 players at Richmond to play all 11 matches to that point in the season. He was equal third at the club for goals kicked that season and also ranked 12th in the league for forward half pressure. In round 18 Castagna laid a career high nine tackles in the club's win over Greater Western Sydney. Castagna received the AFL Rising Star nomination for round 19 after kicking three goals and gathering 16 disposals in Richmond's 33-point win over the Gold Coast at Metricon Stadium. Castagna was a member of Richmond's finals team in 2017, and kicked a goal in each of the club's three matches in the series including in a victorious Grand Final. He finished the season a premiership player and having played in all 25 matches at senior level. His 26 goals for the season placed him fourth at the club and third among Rising Star eligible players across the season. Though he did not place in the award's tally Castagna also ranked top 10 among such players in 12 statistical categories including number one in score involvements, marks inside 50 and tackles inside 50.

=== 2018 season ===
Castagna entered the 2018 season having earned a permanent promotion to Richmond's senior list and signing a new two-year deal with the club. He also changed his guernsey number, moving up to the number 11 vacated by the de-listed Jake Batchelor at season's end. Castagna had his first opportunity to wear it in February, lining up in the Richmond side for an AFLX round robin in Sydney. He also played in each of the club's two pre-season matches before lining up against Carlton in round 1 of the home and away season. Castagna attracted media attention in round 3 when he was incorrectly awarded a goal during a video umpire review only for the call to be reviewed a second time and the correct decision to be applied. He also attracted the coaches attention though, awarded two votes in the association's player of the year award after a three-goal performance. Another three goals followed the next week in the club's round 4 win over Brisbane. In round 8 Castagna suffered a hyper-extended knee in the final quarter of that match against North Melbourne but suffered no serious damage as a result. He played the following week against West Coast but missed the club's round 10 match due to some later soreness that emerged as a result of that hyper-extension. Castagna missed a second match in round 11, before returning with a two-goal performance in the club's round 12 loss to Port Adelaide. During that match he received a nomination for Mark of the Year, with a fourth-quarter forward-line specky attracting the highest fan vote of three nominees that round. For a four-game stretch between rounds 15 and 18, Catagna registered eight behinds and failed to kick a goal. That included a particularly notable poor kicking performance in round 17 where he recorded five behinds and one shot out on the full. He improved his output in the final five matches of the season though, kicking a total of seven goals including two goals in a 17 disposal effort in round 23, his 50th career AFL match. In the first week of the finals series the minor premiership winning Richmond hosted fourth placed Hawthorn where Castagna recorded seven tackles but failed to score himself in what was a 31-point victory. His lack of scoreboard output was repeated in the preliminary final, where Castagna's side was knocked out in a shock loss to Collingwood. Castagna finished 2018 having played 22 matches and kicking 26 goals.

=== 2019 season ===
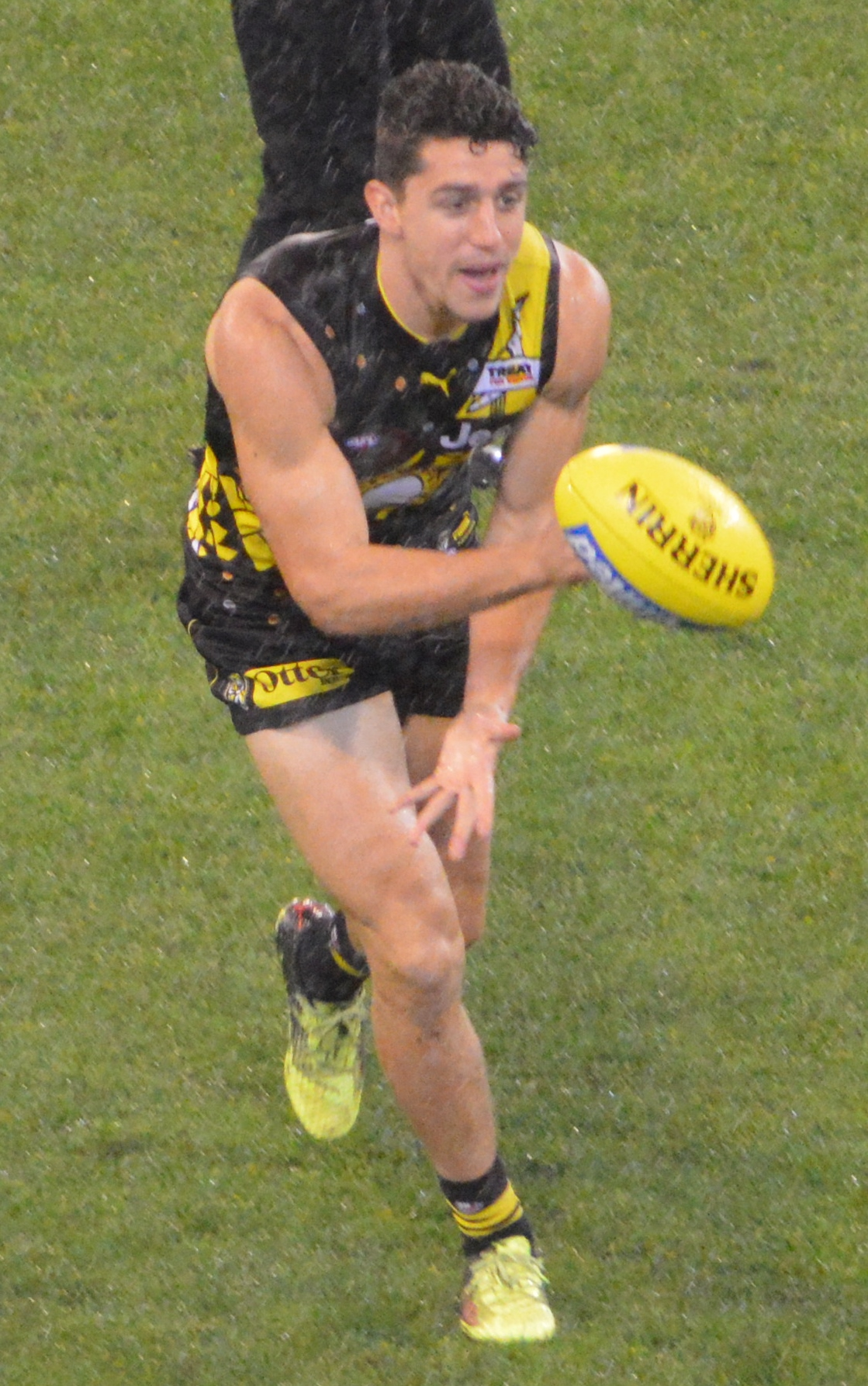
Castagna warms up before the Dreamtime at the 'G game in May 2019

Castagna underwent a restricted pre-season training program in the lead up to the 2019 season, after suffering a minor ankle syndesmosis sprain in early January of that year. By early February he had resumed running but delays in his progression meant he would miss each of the club's two pre-season matches. After two uninterrupted weeks of skills training, Castanga began the season with limited minutes in a VFL practice match with Richmond's reserves side before immediately earning AFL selection in the club's round 2 match against Collingwood. He was unable to impact the scoreboard in the early part of the season, going goalless in each of his first three matches. In round 5 Castagna scored one goal, before adding three more in round 6's ANZAC Day eve win over Melbourne. Two weeks later he would receive the award for the AFL's Goal of the Week, for a running snap while navigating around multiple Fremantle defenders in round 8. In late May he signed a two-year contract extension which would see him contracted through to the end of the 2021 season. Castagna played through the club's mid-season bye averaging 12 disposals a game and having kicked 11 goals in his 12 games to that point of the year. He was exceptional in Richmond's second game back after the bye, taking a career-best 10 marks and kicking a career-best five goals including three in the first quarter as his side demolished Gold Coast by 92 points. For that performance, Castagna earned his first two career Brownlow Medal votes, a place in AFL Media's Team of the Week, 7 coaches award votes and best afield honours as adjudged by The Age. Castagna closed out the regular season with seven goals in the final seven matches as well as posting 22 disposals in round 21's win over Carlton, his highest tally since his debut season and his most while playing as a forward. In the opening round of the finals, Castagna contributed a goal as Richmond defeated the Brisbane Lions by 47 points in their qualifying final at The Gabba. AFL Media said he "played an important role" in the preliminary final a fortnight later, kicking two goals as his side defeated Geelong and earned a grand final matchup against Greater Western Sydney. Castagna was prolific in the grand final, recording 20 disposals and six shots on goal in his side's 89-point victory that earned him a second premiership in three years. He did however miss all six shots on goal, leading AFL Media to say he had "threatened to be one of the game's best players but ultimately let himself down with his finishing." Castagna kicked a then career-best 27 goals to finish third in Richmond's goalkicking tally that year, while also ranking first for tackles inside-50, second for marks inside-50 and equal third for tackles. He ultimately placed equal-tenth in the club's best and fairest count.

=== 2020 season ===
Castagna featured in the pre-season series in March 2020, and was named by AFL Media as among Richmond's best players with a two-goal performance in the last of those two matches. He kicked an equal team-high three goals in a round 1 win over Carlton when the season began a fortnight later, but under extraordinary conditions imposed on the league as a result of the rapid progression of the coronavirus pandemic into Australia. In what the league planned would be the first of a reduced 17-round season, the match was played without crowds in attendance due to public health prohibitions on large gatherings and with quarter lengths reduced by one fifth in order to reduce the physical load on players who would be expected to play multiple matches with short breaks in the second half of the year. Just three days later, the AFL Commission suspended the season for an indefinite period after multiple states enforced quarantine conditions on their borders that effectively ruled out the possibility of continuing the season as planned. Castagna contributed 11 disposals in a draw against Collingwood when the season resumed in June after an 11-week hiatus. Castagna ranked second at Richmond with six goals to round 4 and kicked one more in round 5, before the club was relocated to the Gold Coast in response to a virus outbreak in Melbourne. He kicked two goals and had seven marks in round 9's win over the Western Bulldogs, but one week later The Age labelled his output that season as "modest". Despite a five disposal game in round 11 that 1116 SEN labeled as having "almost zero impact", Castagna ranked equal-third for goals, third for marks inside 50 and equal-fifth for inside-50s among Richmond players to that point in the season. In round 14, Castagna was named by AFL Media as among Richmond's best players in a win over West Coast, after recording 16 disposals and kicking one goal. After being one of just four Richmond players to play in every regular season game that year, Castagna opened his finals campaign with a one goal performance in a qualifying final loss to the Brisbane Lions. He kicked one more goal in the semi-final win over St Kilda a week later, before a quieter output against Port Adelaide in a victorious preliminary final one week later. Castagna became a three-time premiership player in the grand final the following week, kicking a goal in a third-quarter fightback as Richmond defeated Geelong by 31 points. In addition to his premiership silverware, Castagna's 17 goals placed him fourth among Richmond goalkickers and earned him 13th place in the club's best and fairest award in a season that saw him feature in all 21 possible matches.

== Player profile ==
Castagna plays as a versatile small forward with good marking abilities for his height, reliable offensive skills and is also particularly adept at applying forward-half defensive pressure. Since 2017 he has made improvements on relatively poor set shot goalkicking after Richmond coaches identified it as an area of weakness for him. In his first two years at Richmond, Castagna played as a rebounding half-back but switched roles to become a small forward ahead of the 2017 season, a role he has maintained since.

== Statistics ==
Updated to the end of round 23, 2022.

Legend
G	Goals	K	Kicks	D	Disposals	T	Tackles
B	Behinds	H	Handballs	M	Marks

Season	Team	No.	Games	Totals							Averages (per game)							Votes
Season	Team	No.	Games	G	B	K	H	D	M	T	G	B	K	H	D	M	T	Votes
2015	Richmond	46	0	—	—	—	—	—	—	—	—	—	—	—	—	—	—	—
2016	Richmond	46	5	2	0	40	34	74	20	8	0.4	0.0	8.0	6.8	14.8	4.0	1.6	0
2017^{#}	Richmond	46	25	26	20	149	121	270	74	75	1.0	0.8	6.0	4.8	10.8	3.0	3.0	0
2018	Richmond	11	22	26	24	128	99	227	65	64	1.2	1.1	5.8	4.5	10.3	3.0	2.9	0
2019^{#}	Richmond	11	24	27	28	200	153	353	99	75	1.1	1.2	8.3	6.4	14.7	4.1	3.1	2
2020^{#} (Note: The 2020 season was played with 17 home-and-away matches per team (down from 22) and 16-minute quarters with time on (down from 20-minute quarters with time on) due to the impact of the COVID-19 pandemic.)	Richmond	11	21	17	12	142	96	238	71	46	0.8	0.6	6.8	4.6	11.3	3.4	2.2	0
2021	Richmond	11	21	17	13	120	126	246	85	41	0.8	0.6	5.7	6.0	11.7	4.0	2.0	0
2022	Richmond	11	16	12	9	100	81	181	59	33	0.8	0.6	6.3	5.1	11.3	3.7	2.1	0
Career			134	127	106	879	710	1589	473	342	0.9	0.8	6.6	5.3	11.9	3.5	2.6	2

== Honours and achievements ==
Team

- 3× AFL premiership player (Richmond): 2017, 2019, 2020
- McClelland Trophy (Richmond): 2018

Individual

- AFL Rising Star nominee: 2017
