= Ryan Garthwaite =

Australian rules footballer (born 1998)

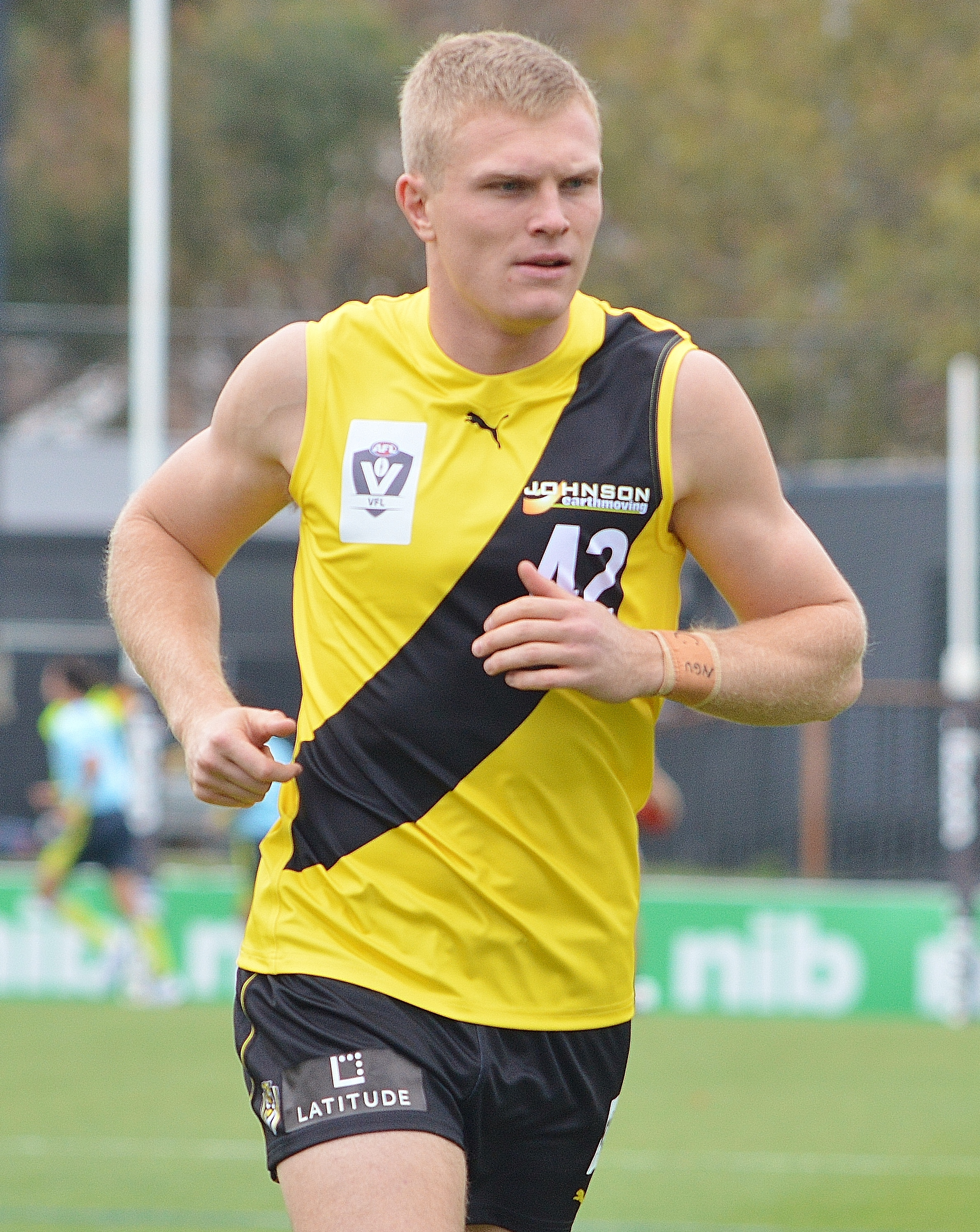
- Garthwaite with Richmond's VFL team in April 2021

Personal information
- Nicknames: Garthhole, Daryl, Garth Vader
- Born: 30 June 1998 (age 28)
- Original teams: Yarrawonga, Corowa Rutherglen, Murray Bushrangers (TAC Cup)
- Draft: No. 72, 2016 AFL national draft
- Debut: Round 13, 2018, Richmond vs. Geelong, at MCG
- Height: 192 cm (6 ft 4 in)
- Weight: 91 kg (201 lb)
- Position: Defender

Playing career^{1}
Years	Club	Games (Goals)
2017–2021	Richmond	14 (0)
- ^{1} Playing statistics correct to the end of 2021.

Career highlights
- VFL: VFL premiership player: 2019

Ryan Garthwaite (born 30 June 1998) is a former professional Australian rules footballer who played for the Richmond Football Club in the Australian Football League (AFL). He won a VFL premiership while playing with the club's reserves side in 2019.

== Early life and junior football ==
Garthwaite grew up in Corowa, a country town in New South Wales' Riverina region.

He first played junior football with the Yarrawonga Football Club in the junior ranks of the Ovens & Murray Football League. In 2013 Garthwaite played with a combined Rivernia-Murray area team at the 2013 under 15 New South Wales schools championships. That same year he switched local clubs, playing instead with Lavington. There he was a key player in the club's junior premiership in 2014, kicking five goals in Lavington's victory in division one of the Ovens and Murray under 16 league.

Another club switch followed in 2015, with Garthwaite moving to play with the Corowa-Rutherglen Football Club. There he earned a senior debut at age 16 that year. He also begun representing his region in state-league junior football in 2015, playing with the Murray Bushrangers in the TAC Cup. Up to this point he played exclusively as a forward, before making a switch into defence with the Bushrangers. He placed second in the club's best and fairest award that year despite being an underager, finishing behind only future-first-round AFL draft pick Clayton Oliver.

After undergoing knee-surgery in the off-season, he rejoined the Bushrangers in 2016, a consistent performer in defence across the season. After a best-on-ground performance in the club's preliminary final he was again named in Murray's best the next week, this time in their TAC Cup grand final loss. Garthwaite repeated his effort set the year previous, again placing second in the club's best and fairest count. He was named by Fox Sports as the junior league's best one-on-one key defender that season, with Champion Data statistics also revealing he lost just two such contests, less than 7% of his one-on-ones in 2016. Garthwaite was also noted by AFL Draft Central as one of the best intercept marks in that competition, having averaged 6.5 marks per game across the season. During the year he also played intermittent senior football with the Corowa-Rutherglen in the Ovens & Murray Football League. He played a total of three senior matches across his two years with the club.

Garthwaite missed out on played with the NSW/ACT Rams in division two of the 2016 AFL Under 18 Championships due to a broken scapula, but recovered in time to earn selection to the multi-state Allies team to play in division one later in the tournament. He was rated as the Allies best player in round 3 of the tournament, gathering 12 disposals and keeping his Western Australian opponent Luke Strnadica to a single disposal.

=== AFL recruitment ===
In July 2016 Garthwaite was officially invited to the forthcoming national draft combine in Melbourne. There he placed equal-first in the clean hands test (handballing) as well as equal-second in the goal-kicking test with a score of 25 out of 30.

As a member of the Greater Western Sydney academy he was officially nominated for priority access by the club in late October of that year. Despite this, he was not expected to be selected by the Giants given the number of other academy prospects available to them in that draft.

Garthwaite was noted pre-draft for his skills in one-on-one contests, his strength in marking and spoiling and his ability to play on both small and tall forwards. He attracted criticism though for a highly unorthodox two-handed kicking style, despite being largely reliable in his disposal by foot.

Two weeks prior to the draft Garthwaite was ranked by AFL Draft Central as the 43rd best prospect available that year. A week later he was projected to be selected by Fremantle with the 40th overall pick by ESPN draft expert Christopher Doerre. This was revised on draft-day, with ESPN predicting Garthwaite to be taken 62nd overall by Collingwood.

== AFL career ==
=== 2017 season ===
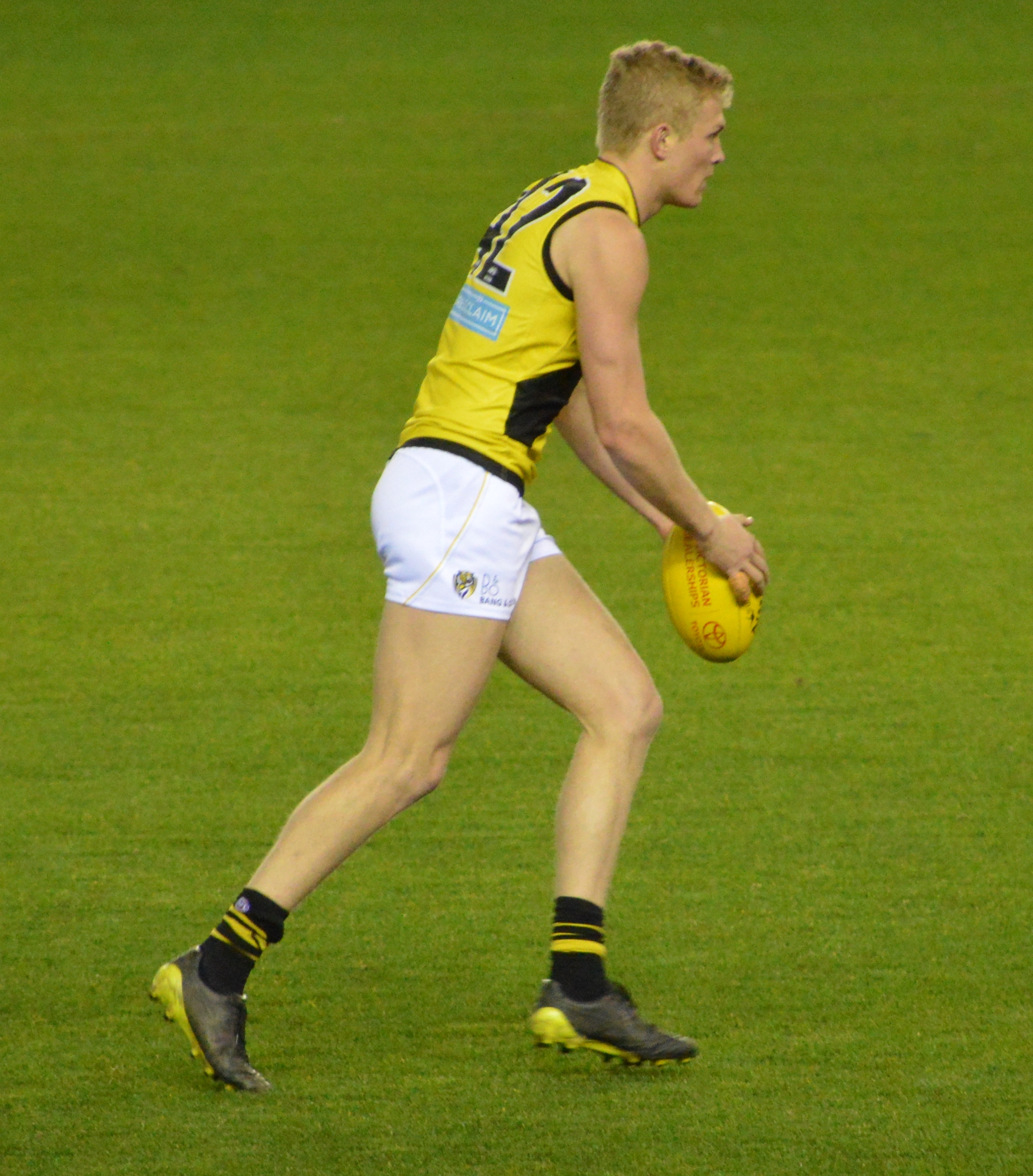
Garthwaite playing in the 2017 VFL Grand Final

Garthwaite was drafted by Richmond with the club's third pick and the 72nd selection overall in the 2016 national draft.

After a pre-season of training plagued by groin soreness Garthwaite first donned the Richmond guernsey in a VFL practice match in March 2017 and remained with the reserves side for the remainder of the season. After an April win over Port Melbourne in which he was named in Richmond's bests, Garthwaite was noted by assistant coach Xavier Clarke as "a very good player at VFL level". Clarke praised Garthwaite's defensive reading of the play and suggested a continuation of his form would see him in the frame for senior selection. At the same time Richmond VFL captain Sam Darley labelled Garthwaite one of the most impressive first year players he had seen, noting he hadn't seen "a first-year player play key position and do it quite so well" in his six years at AFL and VFL clubs. Despite the praise Garthwaite did not play a match at AFL-level in 2017, instead staying with the reserves and playing in each of the team's three finals-series victories as well as in their losing grand final against Port Melbourne. He finished the 2017 season having played 21 matches in the reserves.

=== 2018 season ===
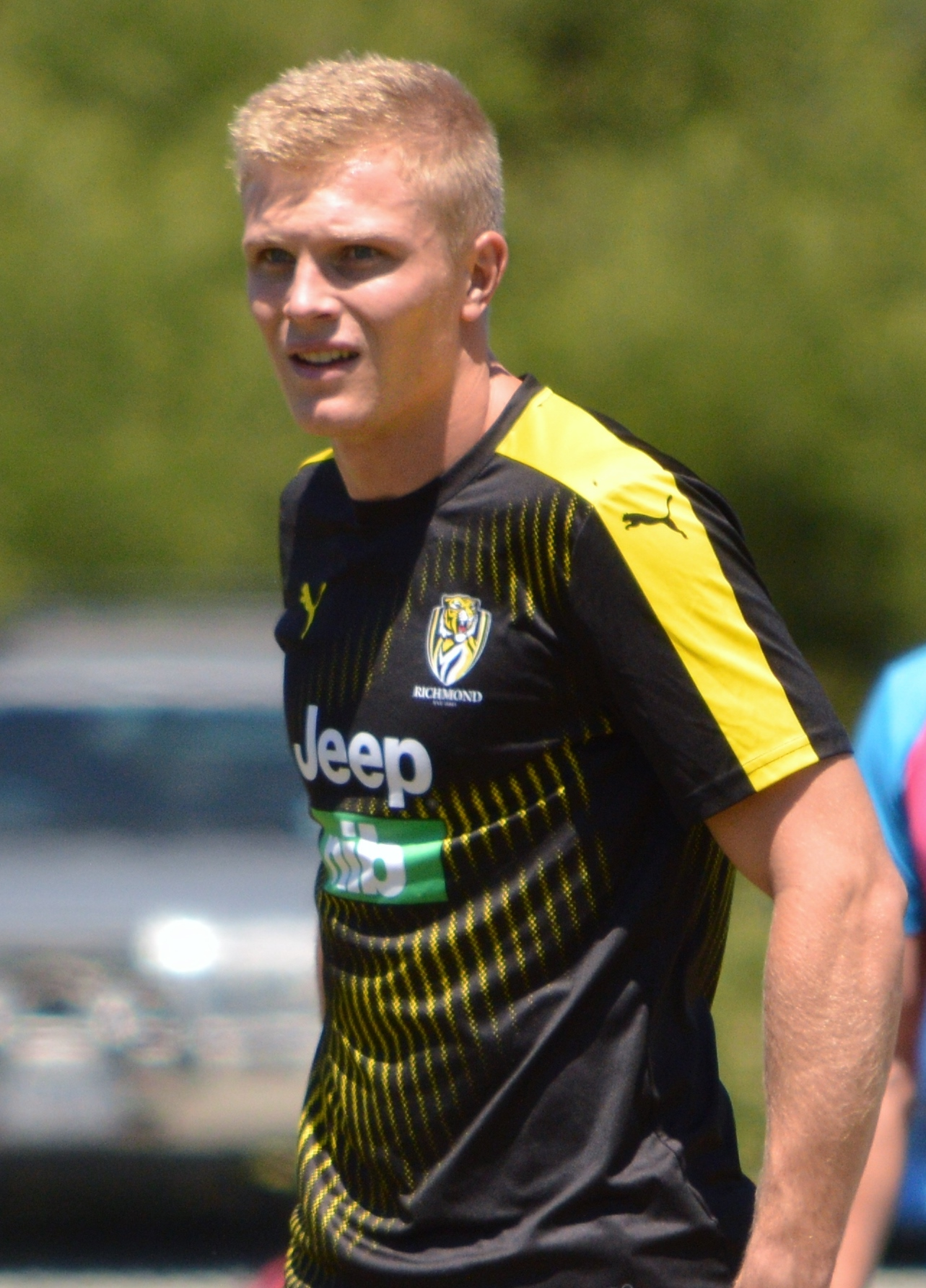
Garthwaite training with Richmond in January 2018

Garthwaite earned his first match at the top-level in Richmond's opening game of the 2018 calendar year, playing a pre-season match against Essendon in Wangaratta in late February. He collected 10 disposals and four intercepts in the match, earning praise from senior coach Damien Hardwick who labelled his individual performance "terrific". Despite that he was left out of the series' second match and would start the season-proper with the club's reserves side in the VFL. He was close to an AFL call-up on a number of occasions in the first half of that season, named as an emergency in rounds 3 and 8. He was again named as an emergency in round 13, but was called up to make his AFL debut when premiership defender David Astbury was ruled out with an ankle injury. Garthwaite found himself matched up on Geelong forward Tom Hawkins and conceded two early goals to the former All-Australian. He finished the match with nine disposals at 100 per cent efficiency in what The Border Mail labelled a "solid" debut. Despite his best efforts, the return of Astbury the following week would see Garthwaite omitted from the club's round 14 AFL side to take on Sydney. He returned strongly to VFL level, but suffered a match-ending ankle injury in the first half of a match against Essendon's reserves side in early July. He missed the next week's match as a result of the injury, before returning to football in the later part of the month. A reoccurrence of Astbury's Achilles soreness in round 22 saw Garthwaite afforded a second chance at senior football in 2018. He paired well with All-Australian defender Alex Rance to blanket Essendon forward Cale Hooker early in that match before enduring a head collision with teammate Shaun Grigg that forced him to leave the field with a bloody face. Astbury's quick recovery saw Garthwaite again omitted after just one match, forced to return to the VFL for the closing stages of that league's home and away season. When the side's VFL finals campaign began however he was unable to take part, held out of play as a carryover emergency for the club's forthcoming AFL qualifying final against Hawthorn. Richmond's football manager Neil Balme publicly spoke out against the scheduling issue that forced both Garthwaite and teammate Sam Lloyd to miss the match, blaming a lack of cooperation between officials at the AFL and VFL. Garthwaite would ultimately go unselected in that AFL final, but would be available for the following VFL semi-final against Essendon. Despite his return, the club would endure a second straight VFL finals loss that saw them knocked out of the finals series and ending their season. With the club's AFL side still playing in finals though, and in the week leading up to the club's preliminary final, teammate Astbury contracted the common cold, a precautionary response to which saw him admitted to hospital and an intravenous drip administered. Garthwaite was on hold as his emergency replacement but ultimately Astbury was ruled fit to play and Garthwaite's season came to an end when the club was upset by Collingwood in that match. Garthwaite finished the year having played two matches at AFL level, while playing a further 17 with the club's reserves side in the VFL.

=== 2019 season ===
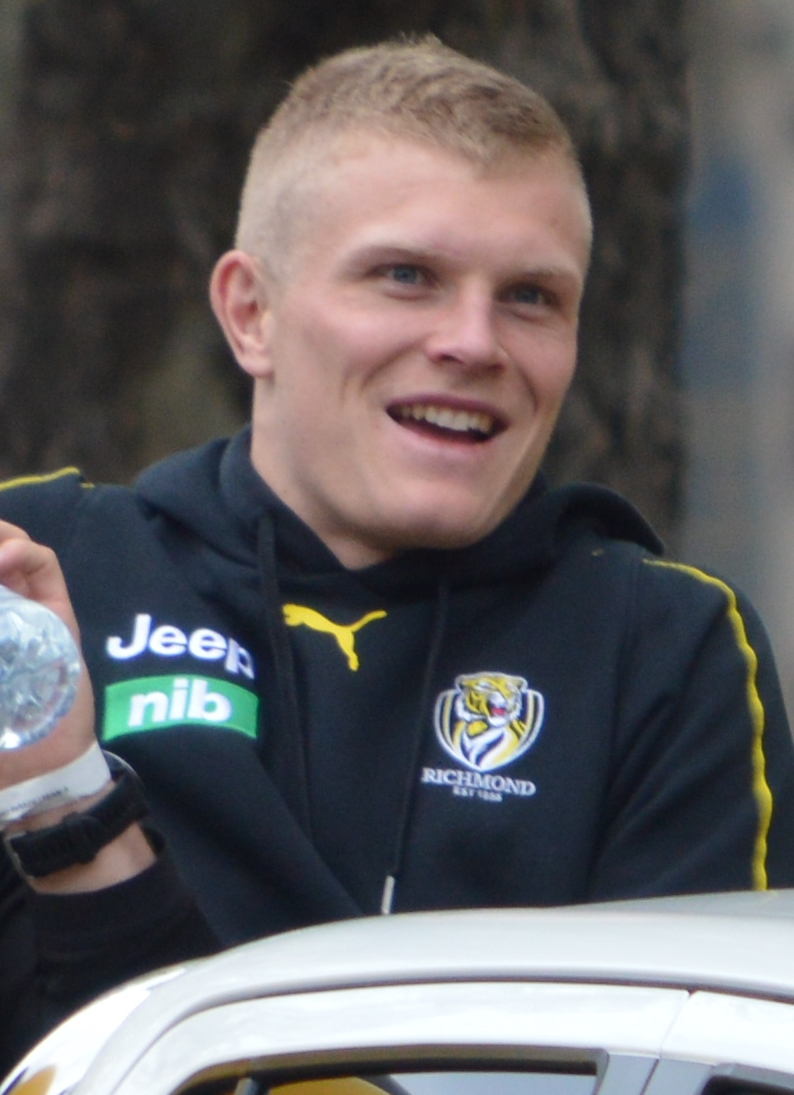
Garthwaite as a non-playing emergency during the 2019 AFL Grand Final Parade

In the weeks immediately following the end of the 2018 season, Garthwaite underwent minor ankle surgery to fully repair damage done to the joint in his July 2018 injury. He returned to running exercises in December but developed Achilles tendinitis that saw him spend time in and out of the main pre-season training group through the end of February. As a result, he missed each of the club's two pre-season matches and started his season with limited game time in the VFL in late March. In the same week that Garthwaite made a footballing return, his teammate and AFL backline leader Alex Rance suffered a season-ending ACL injury. Head coach Damien Hardwick labelled Garthwaite the club's best direct replacement for Rance in his post game press conference, though Garthwaite would remain on reduced minutes at VFL level the following week as he continued on his injury recovery. After progressing well in that match and following AFL defender Dylan Grimes being handed a one-match suspension, Garthwaite was called up to AFL level in round 3's match against Greater Western Sydney. He lasted just one match in the seniors though after conceding seven goals to eventual Coleman Medalist Jeremy Cameron. He was characteristically strong at VFL level, playing what coach Craig McRae labelled "AFL level footy" in three matches before earning a recall to AFL level in round 8 following an injury to teammate Nick Vlastuin. Garthwaite set his own season-best tally with eight marks in that match and continued to perform strongly over two more weeks at AFL level. In round 11, Garthwaite was tasked with assuming primary responsibility for defending North Melbourne's Ben Brown, who finished the match with five goals. Despite that, he remained the number one ranked Richmond player for spoils per game to that point of the season. When teammate and primary tall defender David Astbury was ruled out with injury over the next two weeks, Garthwaite played as the team's lead tall defender but conceded hauls of four goals to each of Tom Hawkins and Josh Jenkins. Richmond coach Damien Hardwick acknowledged Garthwaite's struggles in the role, but said he had shown improvement week-to-week and labelled the experience important for his long-term development. Following those matches, the mid-season bye and Astbury's return from injury in round 15, Garthwaite was dropped back to VFL level. He remained at that level for the final two months of the season as the club's reserves side secured the VFL minor premiership. Garthwaite's side won a come-from-behind qualifying final win over the Essendon reserves before he produced a "masterful" defensive performance in defeating Port Melbourne in a preliminary final a fortnight later. He was a key part of the Richmond VFL side that defeated Williamstown the following week, as the club won its first reserves grade premiership since 1997. Garthwaite was also named as an emergency for the AFL grand final one week later, though went unselected as the club also won the top-league premiership. He finished the season having played seven matches at AFL level, as well as 14 matches with the club's VFL premiership winning reserves side.

=== 2020 season ===
Following the off-season retirement of fellow key-defender Alex Rance, Garthwaite was named by senior coach Damien Hardwick as one player in contention to replace him in the club's top-league side. He assumed the role in the club's first pre-season series match but was afterwards was dropped to reserves level where he participated in a VFL practice match in the first week March. Garthwaite was also scheduled to play in another reserves match the following week that was eventually cancelled due to safety concerns as a result of the rapid progression of the coronavirus pandemic into Australia. He could not earn selection to AFL level when the season began a week later, and was instead a non-playing emergency for the win over Carlton that was played without crowds in attendance due to public health prohibitions on large gatherings. In what was the first of what the league planned would be a reduced 17-round season, the match was also played with quarter lengths reduced by one fifth in order to reduce the physical load on players who would be expected to play multiple matches with short breaks in the second half of the year. Just three days later, the AFL Commission suspended the season after multiple states enforced quarantine conditions on their borders that effectively ruled out the possibility of continuing the season as planned. Garthwaite played in an unofficial scratch match against Collingwood's reserves when the AFL season resumed after an 11-week hiatus, owing to the cancellation of the VFL season. He continued to play practice matches through June, being named as a non-playing emergency on multiple occasions but ultimately being overlooked for selection even despite strong performances and a long-term injury to AFL-tall-defender David Astbury. Garthwaite moved with the main playing group when the club was relocated to the Gold Coast in response to a virus outbreak in Melbourne in early-June, before suffering groin pain in July that saw him sit out practices matches through the early weeks of August. He made a brief return with one reserves game against Essendon in mid-August, but a flare up of the same soreness held him out again until mid-September, after which he remained with the unselected group into the beginning of the AFL finals series. He would not be able to break into the senior side as it worked towards another AFL premiership, finishing the year without having played a match at AFL level.

=== 2021 season ===
Garthwaite spent the 2020/21 off-season training largely as a forward, and was impressive enough to earn a place as a non-playing emergency in Richmond's one pre-season match. He continued to play the role in VFL practice matches that ran during the early weeks of the AFL season, before being named as a defender in the club's VFL season-opener against Sandringham. Garthwaite suffered a serious shoulder injury in that match and was ruled out through the end of April.

After he was delisted at the end of the 2021 season, he signed with SANFL club South Adelaide.

== Playing style ==
Garthwaite plays as a key position defender, tasked with directly negating opposition tall forwards. He is notable for his proficiency at spoiling at defending opposition players one-on-one defensively. As of 2019, the ability to identify more aggressive field positions, intercept and rebound out of defensive 50 was identified by Richmond coaches as a key development focus for his future.

== Statistics ==
Statistics are correct to the end of round 18, 2021

Legend
G	Goals	K	Kicks	D	Disposals	T	Tackles
B	Behinds	H	Handballs	M	Marks

Season	Team	No.	Games	Totals							Averages (per game)						
Season	Team	No.	Games	G	B	K	H	D	M	T	G	B	K	H	D	M	T
2017	Richmond	42	0	—	—	—	—	—	—	—	—	—	—	—	—	—	—
2018	Richmond	42	2	0	0	10	10	20	7	8	0.0	0.0	5.0	5.0	10.0	3.5	4.0
2019	Richmond	42	7	0	0	43	20	63	28	12	0.0	0.0	6.1	2.9	9.0	4.0	1.7
2020 (Note: The 2020 season was played with 17 home-and-away matches per team (down from 22) and 16-minute quarters with time on (down from 20-minute quarters with time on) due to the impact of the COVID-19 pandemic.)	Richmond	42	0	—	—	—	—	—	—	—	—	—	—	—	—	—	—
2021	Richmond	42	2	0	0	5	11	16	2	2	0.0	0.0	2.5	5.5	8.0	1.0	1.0
Career			11	0	0	58	41	99	37	22	0.0	0.0	5.3	3.7	9.0	3.4	2.0

== Honours and achievements ==
AFL (Team)

- McClelland Trophy (Richmond): 2018

VFL

- VFL premiership player: 2019
