= Dan Butler (Australian footballer) =

Australian rules footballer (born 1996)

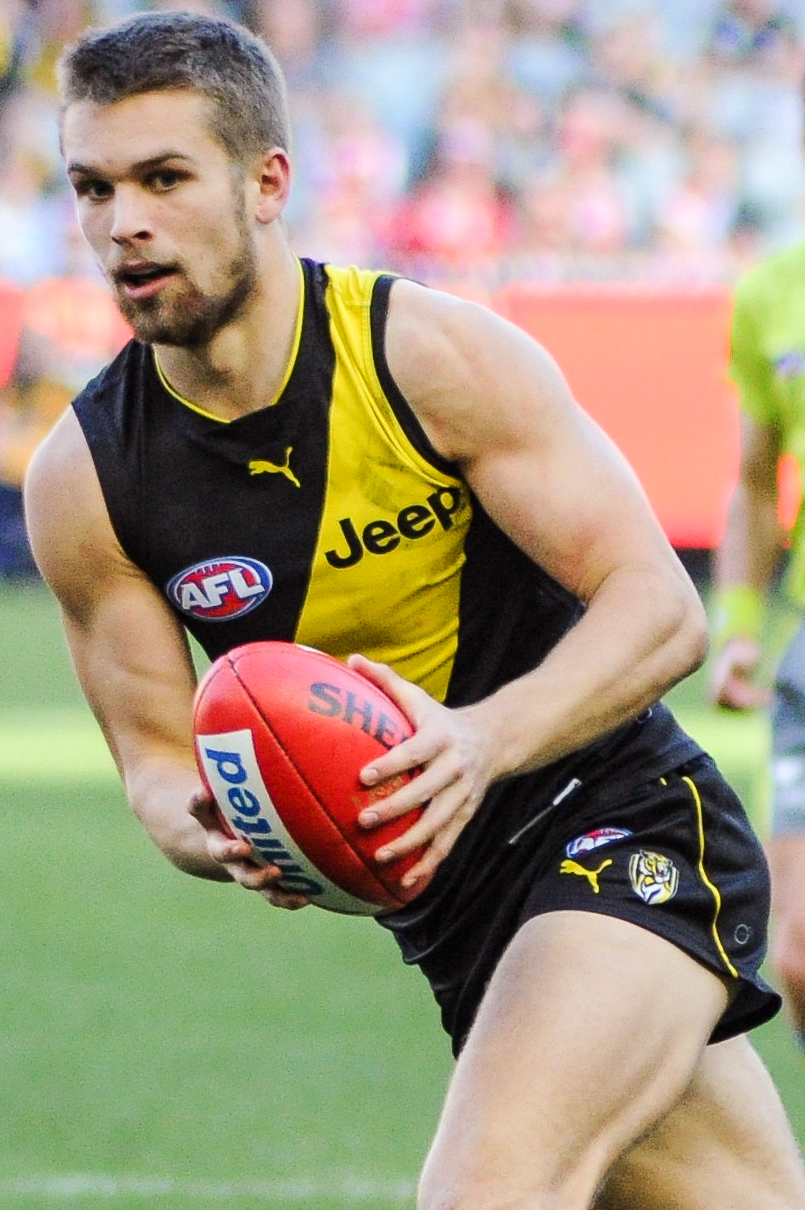
- Butler playing for Richmond in June 2017

Personal information
- Full name: Daniel Butler
- Nickname: Buts
- Born: 3 June 1996 (age 30)
- Original team: North Ballarat Rebels (TAC Cup)/Lake Wendouree Football Club
- Draft: No. 67, 2014 AFL national draft
- Debut: Round 1, 2017, Richmond vs. Carlton, at MCG
- Height: 182 cm (6 ft 0 in)
- Weight: 80 kg (176 lb)
- Position: Forward

Club information
- Current club: St Kilda
- Number: 16

Playing career^{1}
Years	Club	Games (Goals)
2015–2019	Richmond	45 (53)
2020–	St Kilda	115 (125)
Total		160 (178)
- ^{1} Playing statistics correct to the end of round 23, 2026.

Career highlights
- AFL premiership player: 2017; St Kilda leading goalkicker: 2020; Ian Stewart Medal: 2020; AFL Rising Star nominee: 2017; 22under22 team: 2018

Daniel Butler (born 3 June 1996) is a professional Australian rules footballer playing for the St Kilda Football Club in the Australian Football League (AFL). He previously played 45 matches over a five-year tenure at Richmond, after being drafted by the club in the fourth round of the 2014 AFL national draft. He made his debut in round 1 of the 2017 season and became an AFL premiership player that same year. In 2019 he won a VFL premiership while playing for Richmond's reserves side. At the end of the 2019 season he was traded to St Kilda in exchange for a late third-round draft selection. In his first year at St Kilda, he led the club's goalkicking tally, placed second in the best and fairest and was nominated to the extended All-Australian squad.

== Early life and junior football ==
Butler spent his formative years playing football for Lake Wendouree Football Club, a community sporting club in the Victorian country town of Ballarat. He also played for his school St Patrick's College in the BAS schools competition.

In 2014 he played TAC Cup football with the North Ballarat Rebels, kicking nine goals in 13 matches while playing predominately as an outside midfielder. In one match he recorded 17 tackles against Oakleigh. He also played one senior match with the North Ballarat Roosters in the VFL and represented Victoria's country team at the 2014 AFL Under 18 Championships.

He attended secondary school at St Patrick's College in Ballarat. While at the school he featured in three state championship victories from 2012 to 2014 and was the team's vice-captain in the 2014 season.

== AFL career ==
=== Richmond (2015–2019) ===
Butler was drafted by Richmond with the club's fourth pick and the 67th overall in the 2014 national draft.

He did not play a senior match in his first year at the club, sidelined due to a serious knee injury. He played his first match for the club in a reserves match in round 15 of the VFL season, where he remained until the end of the year.

In 2016 he was again looked over, one of just two senior listed players at the club not to play a senior match that season (along with Chris Yarran). In fact, in a mid-year meeting with coaching staff he was informed he would not offered a contract for the following year without a vast improvement in effort and output. In time his VFL performances improved including Butler becoming the team's top tackler in the season's closing months. He was named as an emergency for round 23's season ending match against Sydney but ultimately went unselected. Butler's strong from in the back half of the year saw him earn a one-year contract extension for 2017.

Following a strong pre-season, Butler made his AFL debut in round 1, 2017 against Carlton in the season opener at the Melbourne Cricket Ground. He finished the game with 19 disposals and two goals and was named among Richmond's best by journalists at Fairfax and AFL Media. He was again named in the club's best in round 3, this time kicking two goals to go with 17 disposals. Butler's early performances, along with forward-line companions Jason Castagna and Daniel Rioli, played a key role in Richmond's five game unbeaten start to the season. After five rounds the small-forward trio had combined for 23 goals (Butler with seven) and 44 tackles (16 for Butler). After eight consecutive games played, Butler was ruled out from the club's round 9 clash with Greater Western Sydney with a groin injury. He returned to football in round 11, kicking two goals in his side's victory over North Melbourne. For his performance he received the round 11 nomination for the 2017 AFL Rising Star award. He bested that output in round 14 though, turning in a career best three goals in a win over Port Adelaide at Adelaide Oval. He received a Goal of the Week nomination for one of those, involving a 70-metre run through the centre square evading multiple opponents before scoring from 40 metres out. He would record three goal hauls on two more occasions that season, in round 17 against Brisbane and in a 104-point demolition of Fremantle in round 22. When September came Butler continued his contributions to Richmond's forward line, kicking one goal in a winning qualifying final against Geelong and two more against the GWS Giants in a preliminary final victory a fortnight later. He became a premiership player seven days later, when he kicked a sealing goal in the fourth quarter of Richmond's 48 point Grand Final victory over Adelaide. In addition to his premiership honours, Butler received the 2017 Cosgrove–Jenkins Award as the club's best debutant player as well as placing equal-eighth overall in the club's best and fairest award. Butler also earned a nomination to the 40-man squad, but ultimately went unselected in the final team of the AFL Players' Association's 22 Under 22 team which recognises the best young players in the league. He finished the year ranked first among rising star eligible players for total goals, goal assists and tackles inside 50 as well as top five for inside 50s, score involvements, tackles and marks inside 50.

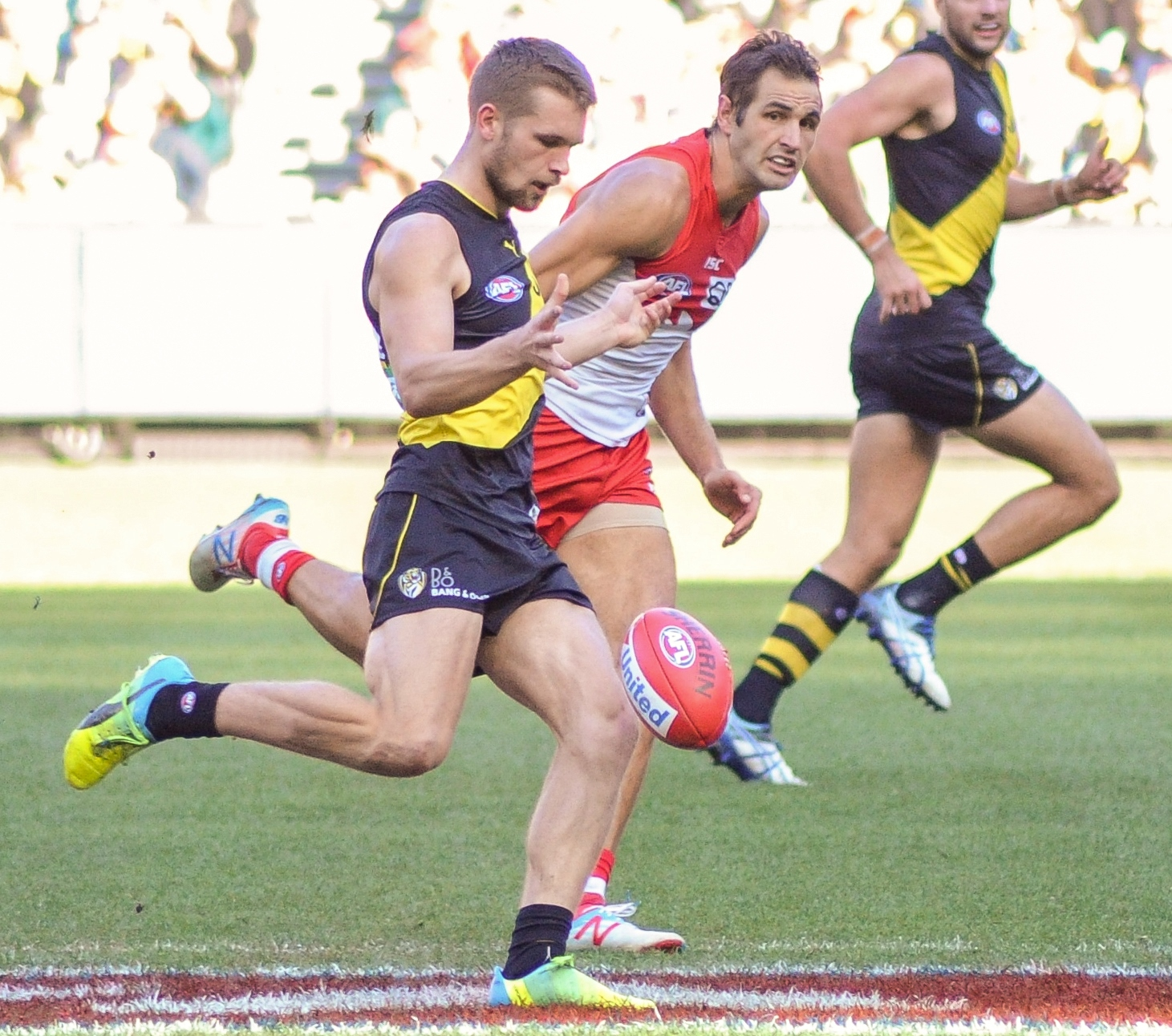
Butler kicks in front of Sydney's Josh Kennedy in round 13, 2017

In the 2017/18 off-season Butler was awarded life membership for his role in Richmond's 2017 premiership. He also switched guernsey numbers during the summer, adopting the number seven to replace the number 40 he had worn in his first three years at the club. Butler played his first football of the year when he represented the club in a series of AFLX exhibition matches in Sydney in February 2018. He followed that up with selection in each of the club's two official pre-season matches and was trailed for parts of those matches in a wing role. Butler was returned to his familiar forward-line role in round 1 of the home and away season however, where he played a starring role that included three goals, seven tackles and nine score involvements. After scoring just one goal in total across the previous four weeks, Butler matched his round 1 haul with three goals against Collingwood in round 6. He added another three in a round 10 win over St Kilda where he was also named by AFL Media as among Richmond's best players for the match. Butler added two goals in each of rounds 11 and 13 before being named by AFL Media as Richmond's best player under 21 year of age as of the mid-season break that year. Immediately following the bye Butler recorded a season-low seven disposals in his side's win over Sydney. He repeated the same mark the following week, but this time hampered by an ankle injury sustained in the third quarter of that win over Adelaide. The injury was later revealed as a syndesmosis sprain that would require at least four weeks rest and rehabilitation. That timetable would be expanded however when Butler was sent in for minor surgery in mid-August due to poor recovery. A revised recovery timetable saw Butler return to full health in time to play limited minutes in the club's VFL qualifying final in early September. He failed to earn selection in the club's first AFL final the next week however, with coach Damien Hardwick deeming his fitness less than "100 per cent". Continuing ankle soreness saw Butler also ruled out of the same weekend's VFL final, which would prove to be knock-out loss to the Essendon reserves side. Despite training at full fitness he ultimately failed to earn selection in the club's final match of the year, a shock preliminary final loss to Collingwood. At the conclusion of the season Butler was selected to a bench position in the AFL Players' Association's 22 Under 22 team. He finished the year having played 15 games and kicked 18 goals and ranked 12th among all players in the league in the home and away season for tackles inside 50 per game and 20th for goal assists per game.

Butler returned to the club's best 22 at the start of the 2019 season, appearing in each of Richmond's two pre-season matches before kicking one goal in round 1's season-opening match against Carlton. After failing to kick a goal in each of the next two matches, Butler was dropped down to VFL level. He continued to play reserves football for more than two months, including with two three-goal performances in early and mid May. Butler earned a recall to AFL level in round 11, kicking two goals in a loss to North Melbourne. The following week he set a career-best with 11 tackles in a round 12 loss to Geelong. During the club's mid-season bye, the soon to be out of contract Butler began being linked in media reports to a possible off-season move, including to rival club Carlton. Butler was left out of the club's AFL side following the bye, returning to VFL level where he performed strongly including in stints as a midfielder over the next five weeks. He was given another AFL opportunity in round 20, but it was to be for only one match, dropped again after just eight disposals. Butler remained the club's minor premiership winning VFL side into their finals series, contributing a match-high four goals in a come-from-behind qualifying final victory over the Essendon reserves. In the week that followed, Butler toured Carlton's facilities ahead of his coming off-season contractual decision, before contributing in a VFL preliminary final as Richmond's reserves won through to that league's grand final. One week later, Butler was named as an emergency before the club's AFL preliminary final but went unselected in the final side and instead lined up in the VFL grand final. He was one of his side's best players in the early stages of the match, collecting 17 disposals though ultimately going goalless in the premiership winning-victory over Williamstown. Though the club's AFL side would also win through to and be victorious in a grand final the following week, Butler remained unselected at the level. Butler finished 2019 having played seven matches at AFL level but was Richmond's equal-leading goalkicker in the reserves, with 21 goals across 15 games including that year's VFL premiership.

Butler's playing future remained uncertain following the end of the season and after a five-year tenure at Richmond that had included 45 AFL matches and premierships at both AFL and VFL levels. In addition to existing contact with Carlton, media reports in the opening days of the off-season trade period cited further interest in Butler from both Hawthorn and St Kilda. Richmond list boss Neil Balme expressed public support for Butler to explore greater AFL-level playing opportunities at other clubs in the first week of October, before interest from Carlton cooled in light of the pursuit of multiple other small forwards. With four days remaining in the trade period, Butler informed Richmond officials of his desire to seek a trade to St Kilda.

=== St Kilda (2020–present) ===
Butler was traded to St Kilda in exchange for a third-round draft pick, at the time number 56 overall.

In a shortened 17-game season brought upon by the impacts of the COVID-19 pandemic, Butler produced a break out first year at St Kilda, kicking 27 goals in matches with gametime shortened by 20 per cent, leading all St Kilda players and placing equal-eighth among all players in the league. During the season, he received the Ian Stewart Medal for a three-goal best on ground performance in a win over Richmond in round 4. Butler also featured in the club's finals campaign, kicking one goal each in an elimination final win over the Western Bulldogs and a semi-final loss to Richmond. For his outstanding season, Butler earned a nomination to the 40-man All Australian squad, though went unselected in the final team. He also placed second in the club best and fairest award behind only Jack Steele.

Butler's 2021 season was decent, although he failed to reach the individual heights achieved the previous season. Butler managed 18 goals for the season, well below his output of 29 for the year prior and seemed below his preliminary All-Australian form from 2020 for much of the season. He did however maintain a good standard of forward pressure inside 50, averaging 3.7 tackles a game, 2.7 inside 50s, 1.6 tackles inside 50 and 22 pressure acts per game. Butler kicked the game-sealing goal in the Saints' Round one win against GWS, making a tackle to earn a free shot at goal in the dying seconds of the game. Butler had a pivotal role in the Round four win against West Coast, kicking three goals, including two in the third quarter that swung the momentum in the Saints' favour. Butler also kicked three goals from 18 disposals in the Round seven win over Hawthorn. After some quieter games, Butler again returned to form against West Coast in Round 19 collecting a career-high 20 disposals and kicking two goals as the Saints fell short by eight points. Buter's tackling was his standout in 2021, with a sensational 10 tackles against Adelaide in Round 13 and nine against Sydney in Round 21. Ultimately he had 10 games in which he had four tackles or more. Butler played all 22 games for the year, meaning he had played in all 41 possible matches since crossing from Richmond.

== Statistics ==
Updated to the end of round 22, 2026.

Legend
G	Goals	K	Kicks	D	Disposals	T	Tackles
B	Behinds	H	Handballs	M	Marks
#	Played in that season's premiership team

Season	Team	No.	Games	Totals							Averages (per game)							Votes
Season	Team	No.	Games	G	B	K	H	D	M	T	G	B	K	H	D	M	T	Votes
2015		40	0	—	—	—	—	—	—	—	—	—	—	—	—	—	—	0
2016		40	0	—	—	—	—	—	—	—	—	—	—	—	—	—	—	0
2017^{#}	Richmond	40	23	30	15	159	102	261	41	83	1.3	0.7	6.9	4.4	11.3	1.8	3.6	0
2018	Richmond	7	15	18	10	111	61	172	34	50	1.2	0.7	7.4	4.1	11.5	2.3	3.3	0
2019	Richmond	7	7	5	3	44	19	63	14	27	0.7	0.4	6.3	2.7	9.0	2.0	3.9	0
2020 (Note: The 2020 season was played with 17 home-and-away matches per team (down from 22) and 16-minute quarters with time on (down from 20-minute quarters with time on) due to the impact of the COVID-19 pandemic.)	St Kilda	16	19	29	12	156	49	205	37	74	1.5	0.6	8.2	2.6	10.8	1.9	3.9	8
2021	St Kilda	16	22	18	17	170	78	248	43	82	0.8	0.8	7.7	3.5	11.3	2.0	3.7	0
2022	St Kilda	16	19	19	8	127	60	187	35	77	1.0	0.4	6.7	3.2	9.8	1.8	4.1	1
2023	St Kilda	16	24	33	13	176	83	259	49	101	1.4	0.5	7.3	3.5	10.8	2.0	4.2	0
2024	St Kilda	16	16	13	4	80	51	131	36	56	0.8	0.3	5.0	3.2	8.2	2.3	3.5	0
2025	St Kilda	16	6	7	2	31	15	46	13	9	1.2	0.3	5.2	2.5	7.7	2.2	1.5	0
2026	St Kilda	16	8	4	1	43	24	67	11	27	0.5	0.1	5.4	3.0	8.4	1.4	3.4	0
Career			159	176	85	1097	542	1639	313	586	1.1	0.5	6.9	3.4	10.3	2.0	3.7	9

== Honours and achievements ==
Team

- AFL premiership player (Richmond): 2017
- McClelland Trophy (Richmond): 2018

VFL

- VFL premiership player: 2019

Individual

- St Kilda leading goalkicker: 2020
- 2nd place, St Kilda best and fairest: 2020
- All-Australian squad nominee: 2020
- AFL Rising Star nominee: 2017
- 22under22 team: 2018
- Cosgrove–Jenkins Award (RFC Best First-Year Player): 2017
- Ian Stewart Medal: 2020

== Personal life ==
Butler finds hobbies in surfing and table tennis, the later of which lead him to a year-long competition with house and teammate Jason Castagna that resulted in the loser Castagna getting a tattoo of a table tennis bat with Butler's initials on this upper thigh. He is a life member at Richmond.
