= Jack Graham (Australian footballer, born 1998) =

Australian rules footballer (born 1998)

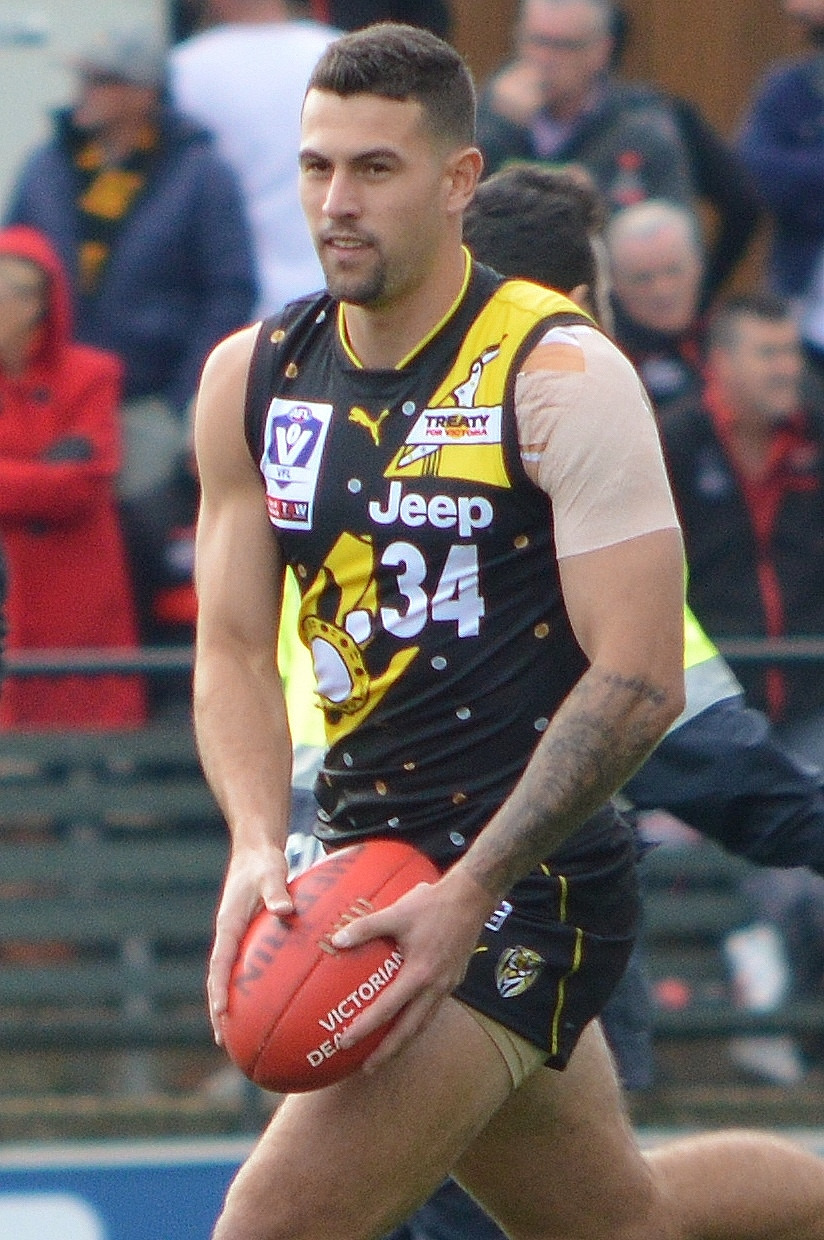
- Graham with Richmond's VFL team in May 2019

Personal information
- Nickname: Fridge
- Born: 25 February 1998 (age 28)
- Original teams: North Adelaide (SANFL); Tea Tree Gully (NEMJFA)
- Draft: No. 53, 2016 AFL national draft
- Debut: Round 22, 2017, Richmond vs. Fremantle, at Domain Stadium
- Height: 181 cm (5 ft 11 in)
- Weight: 83 kg (183 lb)
- Position: Midfielder / forward

Club information
- Current club: West Coast
- Number: 17

Playing career^{1}
Years	Club	Games (Goals)
2017–2024	Richmond	131 (51)
2025–	West Coast	31 (6)
Total		162 (57)
- ^{1} Playing statistics correct to the end of 2026.

Career highlights
- AFL: 2× AFL premiership player: 2017, 2020; Jack Titus Medal (2nd RFC B&F): 2021; Richmond life member: 2017

Jack Graham (born 25 February 1998) is a professional Australian rules footballer playing for the West Coast Eagles in the Australian Football League (AFL). Graham was a two-time premiership player for Richmond, having featured in grand final wins in both 2017 and 2020. As a junior he captained South Australia at the 2016 AFL Under 18 Championships and won the Larke Medal as the competition's best player. After being drafted by Richmond in the third round of the 2016 draft, he made his debut in round 22 of the 2017 season, before becoming a premiership player in just his fifth career AFL game.

== Early life and junior football ==
Graham spent his formative years in the North eastern Adelaide suburb of Greenwith.

Graham participated in the Auskick program at Golden Grove and played junior football with Tea Tree Gully in the North Eastern Metro Junior Football Association. He later joined North Adelaide's development program at age 12 where he began playing representative junior football.

In 2013 he captained the under 15s South Australian representative schoolboys team at the year's national championships. The following year he captained the premiership winning South Australian side at the Under 16 national championships.

Graham made his SANFL senior debut with North Adelaide in June 2015. He had 15 possessions in the match, along with six marks, three tackles and two clearances. That year he was also selected to play for his state at the under 18 national championships as a bottom aged player. He finished the tournament having played two matches.

In the 2015/16 off-season Graham was a member of the 33-man AFL Academy squad. As part of the program he spent a fortnight training with the AFL's Port Adelaide in December 2015. He also joined the other members of the elite group in a training camp in Melbourne and another in the United States. A quad injury sustained during this period however, saw his summer partially interrupted.

In 2016 Graham was selected to represent and captain the South Australian side at the national under 18s carnival. He was named among his state's best players in three of his four games at the tournament His 25 disposals and five clearances per game both lead the competition while his 11 contested possessions saw him rank second. Graham also averaged 318 metres gained in his four matches at the carnival. Graham was awarded the Larke Medal as the competition's best player, becoming the first South Australian to do so in 14 years. He was later named in the competition's All Australian team and received South Australia's most valuable player award.

At state level he also performed strongly that year, averaging 24 disposals per game in the SANFL under 18s through the start of June 2016. A quad injury saw Graham miss the club's finals campaign however and prematurely ended his final season at junior level.

=== AFL recruitment ===
Graham was invited to attend the national draft combine in Melbourne in October 2016. He did not complete physical testing, however, due to a strained quadriceps muscle.

South Australian junior high performance manager Brenton Phillips likened to Graham to Hawthorn's Luke Hodge, saying he was a "really hard, inside, contested-ball winner who probably spreads a bit harder than Hodge."

By the time the national draft came around in late November, Graham's stock had dropped considerably. While the Herald projected Graham in the range 15 to 25, Fox Sport's Ben Waterworth was less confident, citing injuries and poor kicking as reasons for a late second or third round projection. ESPN's Christopher Doerre also had Graham as likely second or third round pick while he was ranked 42nd in Draft Central's projections. He was projected to be selected at pick 23 and pick 24 by AFL Media's Callum Twomey and The Age's Emma Quayle respectively in their draft day phantom drafts.

=== Junior statistics ===
Legend
G	Goals	K	Kicks	D	Disposals	T	Tackles
B	Behinds	H	Handballs	M	Marks

Under 18 National Championships

Season	Team	No.	Games	Totals							Averages (per game)						
Season	Team	No.	Games	G	B	K	H	D	M	T	G	B	K	H	D	M	T
2016	South Australia	16	4	1	—	54	46	100	12	17	0.3	—	13.5	11.5	25.0	3.0	4.3
Career			4	0	—	54	46	100	12	17	0.3	—	13.5	11.5	25.0	3.0	4.3

== AFL career ==
=== 2017 season ===
Graham was drafted by Richmond with the club's second pick and the fifty third selection overall, the last pick of the 3rd round, in the 2016 AFL national draft. In the weeks following the draft, Richmond recruiting manager Matthew Clarke cited Graham's defensive running as a key reason for his selection in addition to his on-ball prowess.

He trained under a limited program in the 2017 pre-season due to the effects of hamstring tendinitis. Graham remained in the clubs injury rehab ground until early March as a result of the injury, failing to play in the club's JLT Community Series campaign. He suffered a further injury setback that month when he fractured his ankle during a club training session. In late June he was removed from the club's long-term injury list and played his first half of football with the club's reserves side in the VFL. Graham sustained a further ankle injury after one half of VFL play in mid-July. He did not return to the match after a first half in which he recorded a stunning 21 disposals, 14 contested possessions, eight clearances and six tackles. He recovered from the injury after missing one match and returned to VFL football in late July.

He finally made his senior debut in round 22 of the 2017 AFL season in an away match against Fremantle at Domain Stadium. He kicked a goal in the match, along with recording 13 disposals and laying a game-high 11 tackles. In doing so he equaled Rupert Wills' VFL/AFL record for the most tackles recorded on debut. He kicked another goal the following week, before lining up in Richmond's qualifying final where he laid six tackles in the first quarter and finished with an equal club-high nine tackles for the match. By his fifth match he was lining up in Richmond's Grand Final side, being the youngest player in either of the Richmond or Adelaide teams. After Crows midfielder Rory Sloane kicked two goals and was influential in the first half, Graham was tasked with a run-with role on him for the remainder of the match. Sloane failed to score again and recorded only six disposals from that point forward. When Richmond defeated the Crows by 48 points, Graham became a 2017 premiership player. He finished the match with a game-high three goals as well as 16 disposals and was one of only six players from either side to receive votes for the best on ground award, the Norm Smith Medal.

=== 2018 season ===
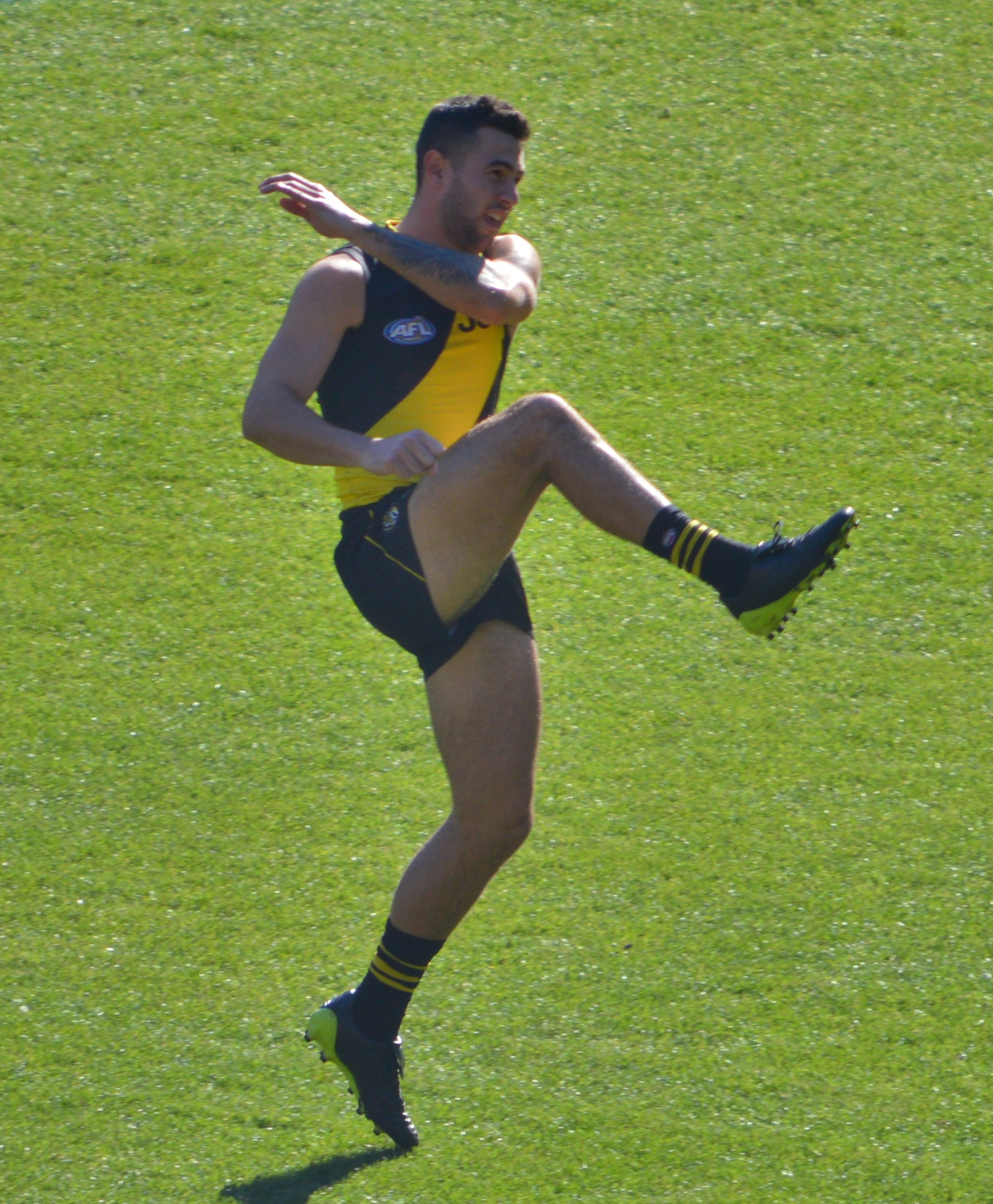
Graham warms up ahead of the round 10, 2018 AFL match between Richmond and St Kilda

During the 2017/18 off-season Graham received life membership to Richmond for his premiership-winning appearance the previous year, despite having played just five AFL matches. He also signed a new two-year contract extension, seeing him secured to the club until the end of the 2020 season. When the new season began Graham found himself right back into the Richmond best-22, making his season debut in round 1's opening match against Carlton. Graham repeated the negating role he had been used in during the grand final the previous year, this time being switched onto Patrick Cripps in an attempt to quell the young star's influence after half-time. He laid a game-high 13 tackles in Richmond's 26-point win and recorded 106 pressure points, the sixth most by any player in the history of the statistic. In round 4 Graham set a then season-best mark with 17 disposals but attracted a report for rough conduct against the Brisbane Lions's Dayne Zorko when he attempted to push Zorko out of a kick and hit him with a forearm to the head. The incident was graded by the AFL's match review officer as intentional conduct with low impact to the head and Graham was subsequently offered a one match ban. Graham and the club elected to challenge that decision however, taking the case to the AFL's Tribunal on the grounds that the hit was careless and not intentional. The appeal was unsuccessful and Graham's one-match suspension was upheld. To that point he was oddsmakers' sixth favourite to take the league's Rising Star award despite not having been nominated and was ruled ineligible to win the award as result of the suspension incurred. At the end of round 4 he was ranked number one at the club and third in the league for pressure acts applied per game. Graham returned immediately to senior football after serving that suspension and recorded a career-high 24 disposals the following week in a 77-point victory over Fremantle. He received one vote in the Coaches Association Player of the Year tally for that performance in which he also laid seven tackles and kicked his first goal of the season. To the end of round 8 Graham was ranked fifth in the competition for average pressure points applied per game (62.4). Despite that form Graham was omitted from the club's round 12 side to take on Port Adelaide. He did not play at VFL level that weekend either, in what would effectively serve as a one-week rest before he was recalled to AFL football in round 13. There he would equal his season-best tally of 13 tackles, this time recorded in a win over Geelong in wet conditions at the MCG. Graham recorded 17 disposals in the first three quarters of his side's win over Adelaide in round 16 before suffering a match-ending dislocated shoulder while tackling opposition midfielder Myles Poholke. Scans would reveal he had sustained some anterior labral damage in the dislocation and club officials confirmed he was set to miss up to a month of football despite avoiding the need for immediate surgery to repair the joint. Graham made his return from injury in round 21's win over Gold Coast, recording 19 disposals and a match-high 60 pressure acts in the 74-point victory. He earned praise from Damien Hardwick for that performance with the coach saying Graham was "such an important player to us. His pressure points are high [and] he makes other players around him better". In the club's final match of the regular season, Graham recorded 20 disposals and kicked an equal career-high three goals, all of which came in the first quarter of that win over the Western Bulldogs. He also received a two thousand dollar fine from the AFL's Match Review Officer for striking opposition defender Dale Morris during the match. Graham finished the regular season averaging 62 pressure points per game, good for third best in the league behind only Dayne Zorko and league-leader Devon Smith. He had a relatively quiet final series, kicking a goal and laying seven tackles in the club's qualifying final win over Hawthorn but recording only 15 disposals in total across that match and the club's shock preliminary final loss to Collingwood. Graham finished the year having played 18 matches while leading the club for both total tackles and average tackles per game that season.

=== 2019 season ===
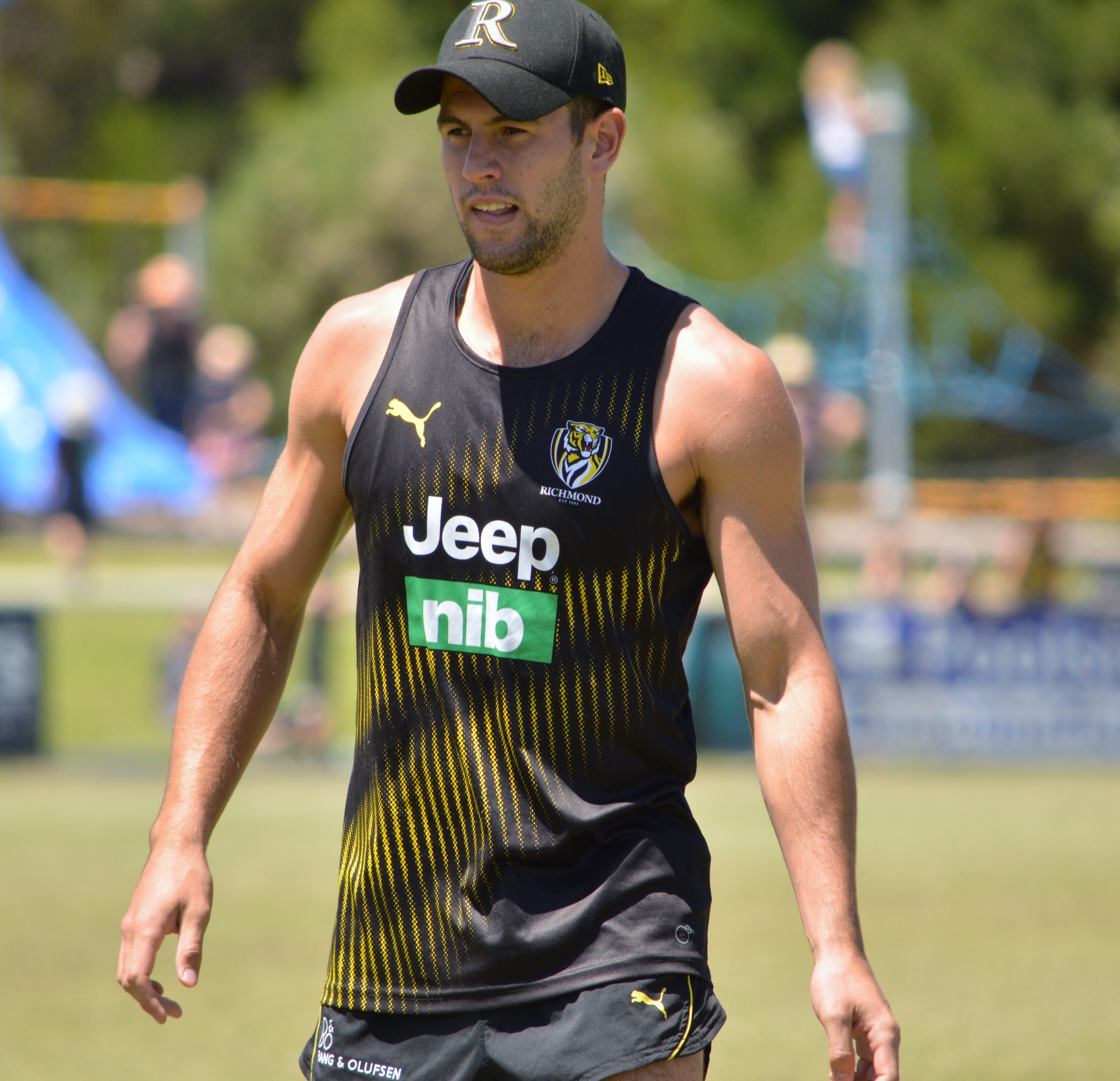
Graham training in January 2018

Graham spent the early part of the 2018/19 off-season rehabbing from shoulder surgery required to fully repair the joint he had dislocated in the later part of the 2018 season. Though he had resumed running by the beginning of the pre-season training period, he would be held out from contact drills until February. Graham was at full health in time to play in each of the club's two pre-season matches before featuring as one of Richmond's best players with 23 disposals and six tackles in a season-opening win over Carlton. He remained at AFL level for a further three matches before being dropped to the VFL after 14 disposals in round 4's match against Port Adelaide. In the opening minutes of his first reserves-grade match of the year, Graham suffered a minor hamstring injury that would see him miss the remainder of that contest as well each of the next three matches. He returned to VFL football with two goals in the Dreamtime match in late May, before posting 24 disposals and 10 tackles the following week and earning himself a round 12 AFL recall. He equaled his season best mark twice over the next month, recording 23 disposals in wins over Adelaide and Gold Coast in rounds 13 and 16. Despite that output Graham was dropped from AFL level in round 17 but also held out from VFL gameplay. He returned immediately in round 18's win over Port Adelaide before equaling a then-career best with 13 tackles against Collingwood in round 19. To that point he ranked third among all players in the league for tackles per game that season. Graham turned in a career-best performance in round 21's win over Carlton, laying 14 tackles, recording 22 disposals and kicking four goals to earn eight coaches votes as the second best player of the game. His performance earned him selection in AFL Media's Team of the Week while his tackle count set a new personal best and equaled a club record. In the opening round of the finals, Fox Footy described Graham as "typically tough" as he laid eight tackles to see his side defeat the Brisbane Lions by 47 points in a qualifying final at The Gabba. Graham suffered a dislocated right shoulder early in the first quarter of Richmond's preliminary final a fortnight later, spending 20 minutes off the field receiving treatment before returning to the field against the expectations of club staff in the later stages of the match. His side eventually made a second-half comeback to win the game and earn a grand final birth, with coach Damien Hardwick saying Graham's effort to return "was simply incredible" and that his tenacity to play on would be remembered as a significant "chapter in (Richmond's) history. In the days that followed, Graham underwent treatment and rehabilitation on the shoulder in an attempt to be fit to play in the grand final, with Trent Cotchin optimistically telling media that the "shoulder probably isn't as bad as (club medical staff) expected". Despite this, Graham was ruled out from the final after a training session early that week. His side went on to win the grand final with an emphatic 89-point defeat of Greater Western Sydney in his absence, while Graham's replacement, Marlion Pickett, played a near-best on ground performance. Graham meanwhile, was one of just six players on the Richmond list to play in neither the AFL nor VFL premiership winning sides that season. At the conclusion of the season, his 113 tackles earned him second place at the club behind Dion Prestia and landed him fifth overall on the club record books for most tackles in a season. Graham was a co-winner of the Francis Bourke award as voted by his peers and placed equal 16th at the club's best and fairest count that year.

=== 2020 season ===
After off-season shoulder surgery, Graham returned to pre-season training on a light program of conditioning and strength work in early December 2019. After missing match-simulation sessions in early February, Graham returned to full contact training in the middle of that month with a targeted return to top-level match-play for the club's final pre-season game. While he missed this target, he did manage to participate in a VFL practice match in the first week March and was scheduled to play in another the following week that was eventually cancelled due to safety concerns as a result of the rapid progression of the coronavirus pandemic into Australia. Graham was recalled to AFL level when the season began a week later, and recorded eight disposals in a win over Carlton that was played without crowds in attendance due to public health prohibitions on large gatherings. In what was the first of what the league planned would be a reduced 17-round season, the match was also played with quarter lengths reduced by one fifth in order to reduce the physical load on players who would be expected to play multiple matches with short breaks in the second half of the year. Just three days later, the AFL Commission suspended the season for an indefinite period after multiple states enforced quarantine conditions on their borders that effectively ruled out the possibility of continuing the season as planned. Graham contributed 14 disposals in a draw with Collingwood when the season resumed in mid-June after an 11-week hiatus. He went without a tackle for the first time in his career during a loss to Hawthorn the following week, before being omitted from the club's round 4 side. He played reserves football in an unofficial scratch match against St Kilda's reserves that week due to the pandemic-related cancellation of the VFL season, where he contributed 11 tackles in an exceptional midfield performance. After one more match at the lower lever and following the loss of midfielders Dion Prestia, Trent Cotchin and Shane Edwards in round 5, Graham was recalled to AFL football in the club's round 6 win over Sydney. He received three coaches award votes for recording 16 disposals and a game-high seven inside-50s in that match, which was played on the Gold Coast after Richmond and all other Victorian-based clubs were relocated following a virus outbreak in Melbourne. It was to be a short three-game stint at AFL level for Graham however, who was dropped after posting a career-worst seven clangers despite a career-low six disposals in a round 8 loss to Greater Western Sydney. He played reserves-grade scratch matches over the next three weeks, before returning to AFL level in the club's round 12 win over Gold Coast. Graham notched a personal season-best 23 disposals in an impressive performance against Essendon one week later, receiving a five coaches award votes as third-best on ground in a win that also included five inside 50s and four clearances. He was again in the bests in round 14, 15 and 18, earning two coaches votes for 16 disposals and a goal in a win over West Coast, three more votes for 18 disposals and a goal in a win over Fremantle and one vote for 21 disposals and eight tackles in a win over Adelaide. After media reports in the final months of the season had identified him as a key trade target for each of Adelaide, Essendon and Carlton, Graham rebuked rival offers to sign a three-year contract extension with Richmond in the final week of the regular season. Graham remained impactful in the opening week of the finals despite the return of Shane Edwards and Dion Prestia ramping up competition for midfield minutes, with Graham recording a match-high nine tackles in the qualifying final loss to the Brisbane Lions. He was quieter in the semi-final win over St Kilda that followed, before contributing defensively with more pressure acts than any other player in his side's comeback preliminary final win over Port Adelaide. Graham became a two-time premiership player one week later, recording 17 disposals and five tackles in his side's 31-point grand final victory over Geelong. After a season in which he played 16 of a possible 21 matches, Graham also placed 11th in the club's best and fairest count.

=== 2021 season ===
Graham played his first football of 2021 in the club's unofficial practice match against Melbourne in February and in the club's sole official pre-season contest against Collingwood in March. He was a stand-out player in round 1, recording career-high tallies for disposals (33), inside-50s (11) and metres gained (836) to earn coaches votes as the second best player in the game behind only Dustin Martin. He was again second-best on ground in his side's round 5 demolition of St Kilda, earning five coaches votes for a performance that included 17 disposals, three goals and a game-high 12 tackles. In doing so he became just the third player in league history (after Gary Ablett Jr. and Cyril Rioli to record two or more matches with 12 tackles and three goals.

=== Move to West Coast (2024) ===
Following the 2024 AFL season, the out-of-contract Graham exercised his rights as a free agent and signed a four-year deal with the West Coast Eagles.

== Player profile ==
Graham plays as a half-forward and inside midfielder, and is adept at his ability to spread away from the contest to clear the ball from contested situations. He is particularly notable for the defensive aspects of his game, including his ability to apply pressure in midfield contests and to lay tackles. In his first two seasons he was also used sporadically as a tagger.

== Statistics ==
Updated to the end of round 22, 2026.

Legend
G	Goals	K	Kicks	D	Disposals	T	Tackles
B	Behinds	H	Handballs	M	Marks

Season	Team	No.	Games	Totals							Averages (per game)							Votes
Season	Team	No.	Games	G	B	K	H	D	M	T	G	B	K	H	D	M	T	Votes
2017^{#}	Richmond	34	5	5	0	30	40	70	9	35	1.0	0.0	6.0	8.0	14.0	1.8	7.0	0
2018	Richmond	34	18	6	3	143	107	250	31	107	0.3	0.2	7.9	5.9	13.9	1.7	5.9	0
2019	Richmond	34	16	8	3	153	119	272	36	113	0.5	0.2	9.6	7.4	17.0	2.3	7.1	1
2020^{#}	Richmond	34	16	2	2	110	130	240	31	72	0.1	0.1	6.9	8.1	15.0	1.9	4.5	3
2021	Richmond	34	22	11	7	220	198	418	56	122	0.5	0.3	10.0	9.0	19.0	2.5	5.5	3
2022	Richmond	34	20	8	2	186	175	361	57	95	0.4	0.1	9.3	8.8	18.1	2.9	4.8	2
2023	Richmond	34	20	9	7	147	156	303	45	77	0.5	0.4	7.4	7.8	15.2	2.3	3.9	0
2024	Richmond	34	14	2	2	102	141	243	30	61	0.1	0.1	7.3	10.1	17.4	2.1	4.4	0
2025	West Coast	17	18	2	4	178	168	346	36	141	0.1	0.2	9.9	9.3	19.2	2.0	7.8	0
2026	West Coast	17	11	4	0	106	83	189	25	66	0.4	0.0	9.6	7.5	17.2	2.3	6.0	0
Career			160	57	30	1375	1317	2692	356	889	0.4	0.2	8.6	8.2	16.8	2.2	5.6	9

== Honours and achievements ==
Team

- 2× AFL premiership player (Richmond): 2017, 2020
- McClelland Trophy (Richmond): 2018

Junior

- Larke Medal: 2016
- Under 18 All-Australian: 2016
- Under 18 South Australia captain: 2016
- Under 16 South Australia captain: 2014

== Personal life ==
Graham's father Jeff Graham played 77 matches with West Torrens and Woodville West-Torrens in the SANFL between 1987 and 1992.
