= 2017 AFL Grand Final =

Grand final of the 2017 Australian Football League season

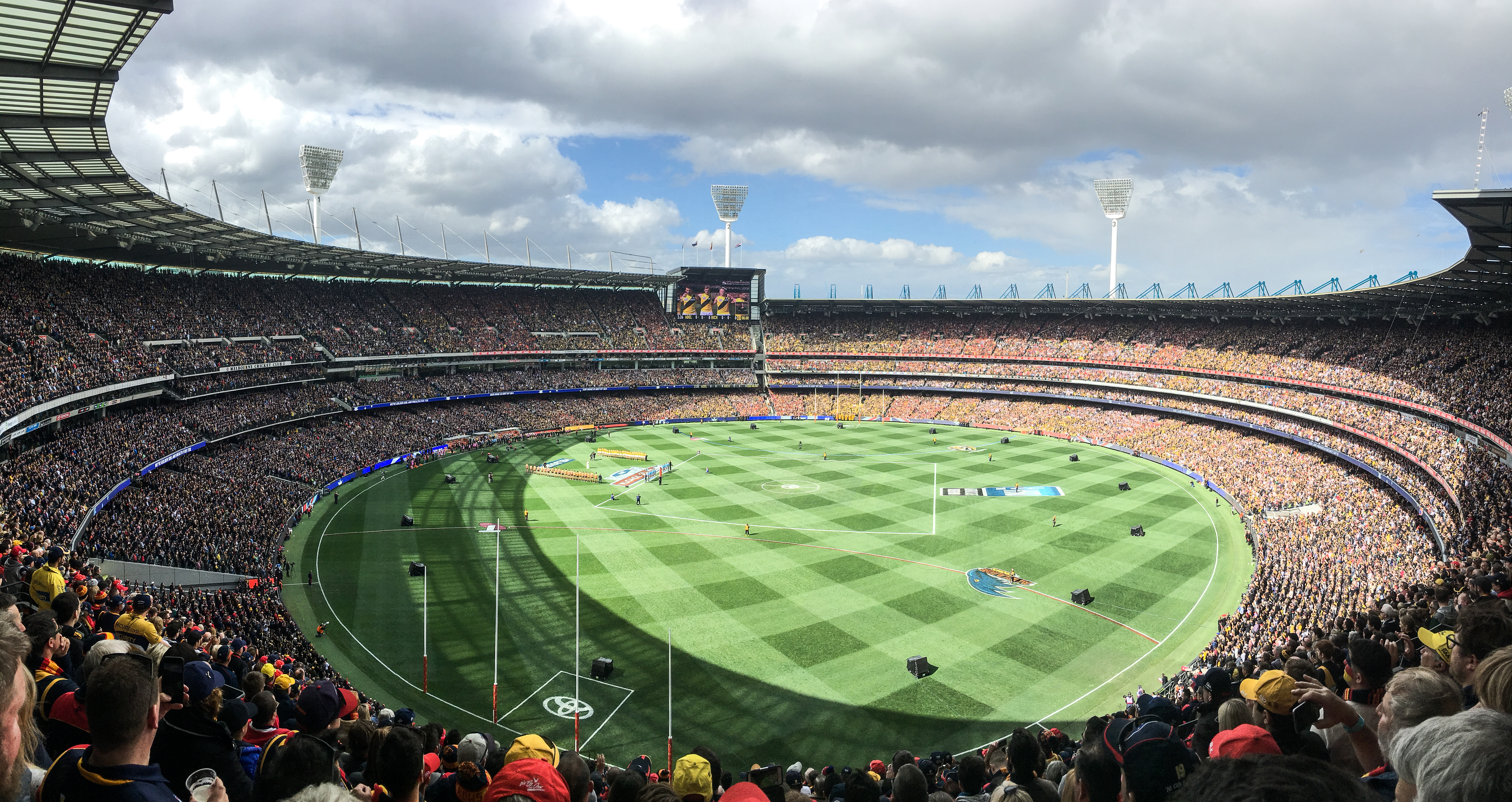
- Panorama of the Melbourne Cricket Ground during the national anthem prior to the start of the match

Adelaide	Richmond
8.12 (60)	16.12 (108)
	1	2	3	4
ADE	4.2 (26)	4.7 (31)	5.10 (40)	8.12 (60)
RIC	2.3 (15)	6.4 (40)	11.8 (74)	16.12 (108)
- Date: 30 September 2017, 2.30 pm
- Stadium: Melbourne Cricket Ground
- Attendance: 100,021
- Favourite: Adelaide
- Umpires: Matt Stevic, Simon Meredith, Shaun Ryan
- Coin toss won by: Adelaide
- Kicked toward: City End

Ceremonies
- Pre-match entertainment: The Killers, Mike Brady
- National anthem: Dami Im
- Post-match entertainment: The Killers

Accolades
- Norm Smith Medallist: Dustin Martin
- Jock McHale Medallist: Damien Hardwick

Broadcast in Australia
- Network: Seven Network
- Commentators: Bruce McAvaney (host and commentator); Hamish McLachlan (host); Brian Taylor (commentator); Wayne Carey (expert commentator); Cameron Ling (expert commentator); Tim Watson (boundary rider); Matthew Richardson (boundary rider); Leigh Matthews (analyst); Nick Riewoldt (analyst); Daisy Pearce (analyst)

The 2017 AFL Grand Final was an Australian rules football game contested between the Adelaide Football Club and the Richmond Football Club at the Melbourne Cricket Ground on 30 September 2017. It was the 122nd annual grand final of the Australian Football League (formerly the Victorian Football League) staged to determine the premiers for the 2017 AFL season. The match, attended by 100,021 spectators, was won by Richmond by a margin of 48 points, marking the club's eleventh VFL/AFL premiership and first since 1980. Richmond's Dustin Martin was awarded the Norm Smith Medal as the best player on the ground.

== Background ==
Adelaide claimed the minor premiership for the second time in their history, finishing on top of the 2017 AFL ladder with 15 wins, 6 losses and 1 draw, edging out Geelong via a better percentage. The Crows recorded two dominant wins in the finals series, defeating Greater Western Sydney by 36 points in the qualifying final and then overwhelming Geelong to win the preliminary final by 61 points.

The Tigers improved immensely from their 13th-place finish in 2016, ending the home-and-away season with 15 wins and 7 losses, placing them third on the AFL ladder, their percentage placing them ahead of fourth-placed Greater Western Sydney. Like Adelaide, Richmond faced tough opposition in the finals series but emerged with convincing victories. After a close first half, they ran away in the last quarter to defeat the higher ranked Geelong by 51 points in a tough away qualifying final, which earned them a week's break and a home preliminary final against Greater Western Sydney, which they won by 36 points. Both were played at the Melbourne Cricket Ground before crowds in excess of 90,000.

This was Richmond's first grand final appearance in 35 years since 1982, the club having last won a premiership in 1980; and it was Adelaide's third appearance in the grand final, the club having won its previous two grand finals in 1997 and 1998. The two clubs were on the longest grand final droughts in the competition at the time. The clubs' normal guernseys were deemed to be clashing; so, as the lower-ranked team, Richmond wore its away guernsey, yellow with a black sash.

The two teams met only once in the home-and-away season in 2017, in Round 6, with Adelaide recording a 76-point win at the Adelaide Oval. Bookmakers installed Adelaide as the favourites to win the grand final, with the Crows regarded by Sportsbet as $1.72 favourites compared to Richmond valued at $2.15 for the win.

== Entertainment ==
As has become custom in recent grand finals, the 2017 AFL Grand Final featured both pre-match and post-match entertainment on the ground. Several weeks before the match, the AFL announced that American rock band the Killers would headline the entertainment line-up and would be joined by Australian football singer Mike Brady. A former Australian representative at the Eurovision Song Contest, Dami Im, sang the national anthem. The Killers' pre-match and post-match performance was praised highly by several news and entertainment outlets, some of whom described their sets as "the best ever" performed at a grand final. Among others, the band played signatures songs Mr. Brightside, Somebody Told Me and When You Were Young, as well as newer song The Man and a cover of Midnight Oil's Forgotten Years. The band also returned to the ground for a free concert following the game where Richmond's Jack Riewoldt performed with the band.

The respective club ambassadors who carried the premiership cup onto the field before the game were Mark Bickley for Adelaide and Matthew Richardson for Richmond. Both worked the game as media members – Bickley as a colour commentator for FiveAA and Richardson as a boundary rider for the Seven Network telecast. Richardson also presented the trophy to Trent Cotchin and Damien Hardwick during the on-field award ceremony.

== Skills events ==
Richmond's Connor Menadue won the sprint event at half-time, with Jarrod Pickett of Carlton taking second and Josh Williams of North Melbourne taking third. Broadcast host Basil Zempilas was the sprint host, while Collingwood's Scott Pendlebury was honorary starter.

In the longest kick event on the Yarra, sponsored by Foxtel, Melton South captain-coach and retired Carlton star Brendan Fevola won with a 66.1-metre kick, with retired Essendon champion Dustin Fletcher taking second and the Western Bulldogs' Matt Suckling taking third. Other competitors included AFLW stars Katie Brennan (Western Bulldogs) and Sarah Perkins (Adelaide) as well as wildcard entry James Pennycuick. Bounce hosts Jason Dunstall, Danny Frawley and Brian Lake presented the event, broadcast on Fox Footy.

== Match summary ==
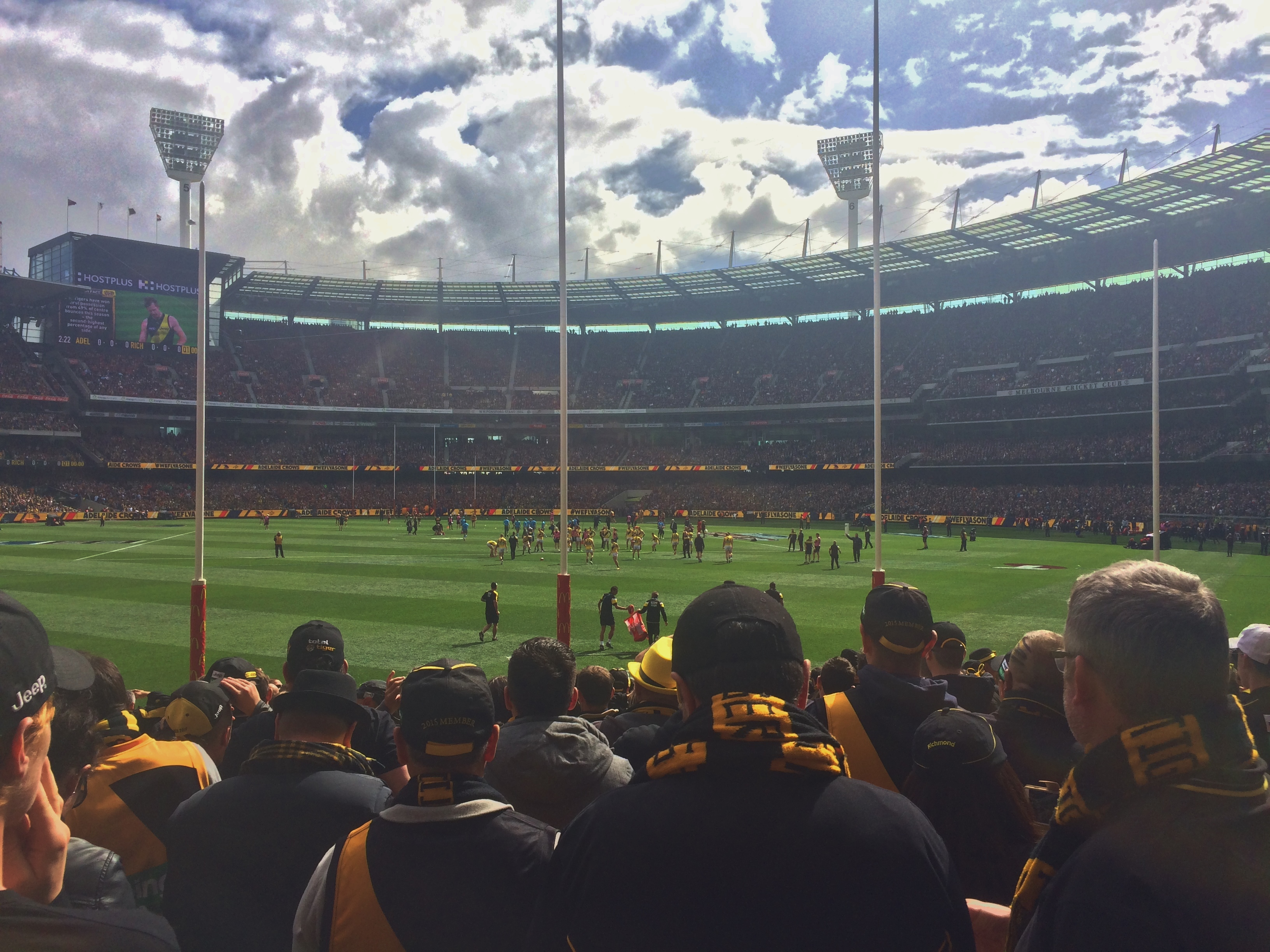
The view from the Great Southern Stand at the Melbourne Cricket Ground prior to the match.

=== Weather conditions ===
The Grand Final was played in cool, mostly cloudy conditions with light winds coming in from the southwest. Rain briefly fell at points during the second quarter but not enough to seriously influence the game.

=== First quarter ===
Adelaide started the game strongly, with Matt Crouch finding Rory Sloane who kicked the Crows' opener. Shortly afterwards, Nick Vlastuin slipped over near the Adelaide goal mouth and Eddie Betts kicked the Crows' second. Richmond full forward Jack Riewoldt missed a string of chances for goal, and it took until the 16-minute mark for the Tigers to score their first goal when Josh Caddy marked in the left forward pocket, ran round and converted. This was followed shortly after with a goal to Bachar Houli, which briefly gave Richmond the lead, before Sloane and Hugh Greenwood answered with crumbing majors for Adelaide to give the Crows a lead of 11 points at quarter-time.

=== Second quarter ===
The Crows had the first two scoring shots of the second term – behinds to Betts and Tom Lynch – but Richmond dominated the rest of the quarter. Tigers' defender Alex Rance provided a pivotal moment three minutes into the term. With the Crows 13 points up and charging into attack, he effected a desperate diving spoil to deny Adelaide captain Taylor Walker on the lead at centre half-forward. Moments later, Riewoldt finally got on the board but he needed some sloppy defending from Adelaide, letting his kick bounce through with no one on the line and Jake Kelly's late lunge ruled ineffective by a score review. Jacob Townsend, who had not played a game in the senior team before round 22, was then awarded a free kick in a marking contest just inside the 50 metre arc, and he converted the set shot to put Richmond within two points. Jack Graham, the youngest player on the field at 19 years old and a former South Australian under-18 captain playing only his 5th AFL game, kicked Richmond's fifth deep in time on to put Richmond in front, and they never trailed from there. A minute later, Martin pushed deep forward and orchestrated a mismatch against Luke Brown, marked and kicked the Tigers' fourth straight to put Richmond nine points up at half time.

=== Third quarter ===
Richmond started the second half in the same manner as they left off in the second. Three minutes into the term, a free for a high tackle from Sloane saw Jack Graham kick his side's seventh. At the eight-minute mark, Shane Edwards managed to find an unguarded Shaun Grigg who converted a mark from 40 metres out. Ninety seconds later, Grigg in turn passed to an open Kane Lambert at full forward, who snapped the Tigers' ninth and the lead was out to 28 points. At the 14-minute mark, Richmond's string of unbroken goals was finally halted at seven as Walker marked inside 50 and converted, the Crows' first major for a quarter and a half. But Graham soon answered with his third goal of the game and eventually finished as this Grand Final's leading goalscorer. In time on, Martin took possession 25 metres out and fed the ball out to Jason Castagna, who snapped over his shoulder to effectively put the game beyond the reach of Adelaide, who trailed by 34 points at three quarter time.

=== Final quarter ===
Adelaide needed a record-breaking comeback to win, but Richmond opened the quarter with even more pressure. Riewoldt opened the quarter with his second goal from a well-contested mark inside the forward 50 and then found Lambert in open space with a handball to make a long run and then pass to Dion Prestia to finish. The Crows tried to make a game of it, kicking two goals in 90 seconds through Walker and Brad Crouch. But any last hope for Adelaide was snuffed out as Townsend intercepted a kick-in and converted the mark for his second goal, and then Dan Butler added another for the Tigers before Martin kicked his second during time on. Charlie Cameron scored a late consolation goal for Adelaide.

=== Overall report ===
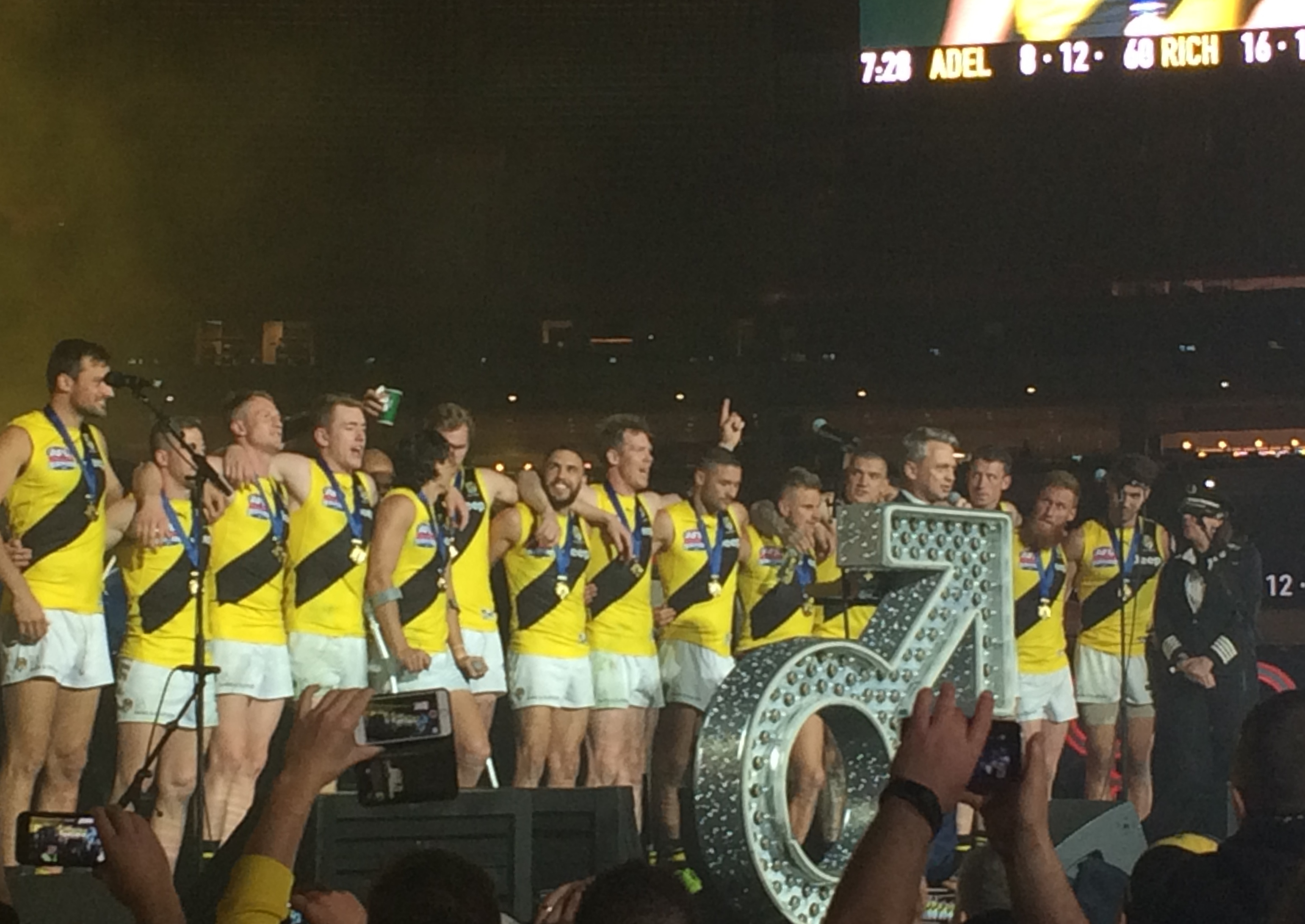
Richmond players celebrate on stage following the 2017 AFL Grand Final

Richmond dominated the game after quarter time with a streak that included 11 of 12 goals. The Tigers dominated the Crows in contested possessions (170-140) and also won the clearances (45-39). Richmond kept Adelaide to their lowest score of the year and completely nullified a team that looked to have as potent an attack as seen in recent years, with the Crows kicking only four goals in the last three quarters and eight in the game.

=== Norm Smith Medal ===
Norm Smith Medal voting tally
Position	Player	Club	Total votes	Voting summary
1st (winner)	Dustin Martin	Richmond	13	3,3,3,3,1
2nd	Bachar Houli	Richmond	10	3,2,2,2,1
3rd - tied	Alex Rance	Richmond	2	2
3rd - tied	Shane Edwards	Richmond	2	2
3rd - tied	Dion Prestia	Richmond	2	1,1
6th	Jack Graham	Richmond	1	1

With 13 votes out of a maximum possible 15, Dustin Martin was awarded the Norm Smith Medal, becoming the first player in VFL/AFL history to win a premiership, the Brownlow Medal and the Norm Smith Medal in the same season. Bachar Houli was the runner-up with 10 votes, while no other player earned more than two votes. Three quarters of Martin's 29 disposals were contested, and he collected 6 clearances and two goals.

The 2000 winner, James Hird, was the presenter, which was notable as it was his first public AFL appearance since being hospitalised after a drug overdose in January in the wake of Essendon's performance-enhancing drug scandal during his tenure as senior coach. The voters and their choices were as follows:

Voter	Role	3 Votes	2 Votes	1 Vote
Terry Wallace	AFL Nation	Bachar Houli	Shane Edwards	Dustin Martin
Chris Judd	Triple M	Dustin Martin	Bachar Houli	Jack Graham
Daisy Pearce	Channel 7	Dustin Martin	Bachar Houli	Dion Prestia
Jake Niall	Fox Footy	Dustin Martin	Bachar Houli	Dion Prestia
Mark McClure	ABC	Dustin Martin	Alex Rance	Bachar Houli

== Teams ==
The teams were announced on 28 September 2017. Both sides went into the match unchanged from their preliminary final teams. Injured Adelaide forward Mitch McGovern failed to recover in time for selection, with Crows' coach Don Pyke ruling him out of contention on the Wednesday of grand final week; and Richmond captain Trent Cotchin was scrutinised for an incident involving Greater Western Sydney midfielder Dylan Shiel in the preliminary final, but was cleared of any charge by the AFL Match Review Panel on the Monday of grand final week.

It was the first time since the inaugural grand final in 1898 that neither team fielded any players who had previously played in a grand final.

Adelaide	Richmond

Adelaide
B:	29 Rory Laird	15 Kyle Hartigan	6 Jake Lever
HB:	11 Paul Seedsman	12 Daniel Talia	16 Luke Brown
C:	14 David Mackay	9 Rory Sloane	21 Rory Atkins
HF:	23 Charlie Cameron	4 Josh Jenkins	18 Eddie Betts
F:	27 Tom Lynch	13 Taylor Walker	26 Richard Douglas
Foll:	24 Sam Jacobs	2 Brad Crouch	44 Matt Crouch
Int:	3 Riley Knight	8 Jake Kelly	20 Hugh Greenwood
Int:	22 Andy Otten		
Coach:	Don Pyke		

Richmond
B:	5 Brandon Ellis	18 Alex Rance	2 Dylan Grimes
HB:	14 Bachar Houli	12 David Astbury	1 Nick Vlastuin
C:	33 Kamdyn McIntosh	9 Trent Cotchin	21 Jacob Townsend
HF:	23 Kane Lambert	4 Dustin Martin	22 Josh Caddy
F:	40 Dan Butler	8 Jack Riewoldt	17 Daniel Rioli
Foll:	25 Toby Nankervis	3 Dion Prestia	6 Shaun Grigg
Int:	10 Shane Edwards	34 Jack Graham	35 Nathan Broad
Int:	46 Jason Castagna		
Coach:	Damien Hardwick		

Umpires

The umpiring panel, comprising three field umpires, four boundary umpires, two goal umpires and an emergency in each position is given below. All three field umpires, Matt Stevic, Simon Meredith and Shaun Ryan, had umpired in previous AFL grand finals.

2017 AFL Grand Final umpires
Position					Emergency
Field:	9 Matt Stevic (5)	21 Simon Meredith (5)	25 Shaun Ryan (6)		Brett Rosebury
Boundary:	Mitchell Lefevre (1)	Matthew Konetschka (1)	Rob Haala (4)	Damien Cusack (1)	Brett Dalgleish
Goal:	Luke Walker (7)	Adam Wojcik (4)			Matthew Dervan

Numbers in brackets represent the number of grand finals umpired, including 2017.

== Scoreboard ==
Grand Final
Saturday, 30 September (2:30 pm)	Adelaide	def. by	Richmond	MCG (crowd: 100,021)	Report
4.2 (26); 4.7 (31); 5.10 (40); 8.12 (60)	Q1; Q2; Q3; Final	2.3 (15); 6.4 (40); 11.8 (74); 16.12 (108)	Umpires: Matt Stevic, Simon Meredith, Shaun Ryan; Norm Smith Medal: Dustin Martin; Television broadcast: Seven Network; National anthem: Dami Im
2: Sloane, Walker; 1: Betts, Cameron, B. Crouch, Greenwood	Goals	3: Graham; 2: Riewoldt, Martin, Townsend; 1: Houli, Prestia, Caddy, Butler, Castagna, Grigg, Lambert
M. Crouch, Jacobs, B. Crouch, Sloane, Laird	Best	Martin, Rance, Houli, Prestia, Edwards, Graham, Grimes
Nil	Injuries	Rioli (ankle)
Nil	Reports	Nil

== Media coverage ==
The match was televised by the Seven Network. The match commentary line-up included Bruce McAvaney and Brian Taylor as play-by-play commentators, Wayne Carey and Cameron Ling were the analysts, while Tim Watson and Matthew Richardson were on the sideline as boundary riders. Hamish McLachlan and Basil Zempilas rotated hosting duties, and Leigh Matthews, Nick Riewoldt and Daisy Pearce provided punditry as part of the pre-game panel.

This was the first grand final commentated by Brian Taylor on commercial television, replacing veteran broadcaster Dennis Cometti, who retired from television duties at the end of the 2016 season. McAvaney called his seventeenth grand final. It was also the first grand final in which Daisy Pearce was a member of the broadcast team.

Fox Footy also had pregame and postgame coverage by a panel that included host Eddie McGuire, Dermott Brereton, Jonathan Brown, David King and Gerard Healy.

The grand final was the most watched television program in Australia for the 2017 calendar year, for the fourth year running, with 2.72 million viewers in the five largest Australian metropolitan cities.

=== Radio coverage ===
Station	Region	Play-by-play commentators	Analysts and boundary riders (If known)
ABC Grandstand	National	Gerard Whateley, Clint Wheeldon	Unknown
Triple M	National	James Brayshaw, Luke Darcy	Chris Judd, Mark Ricciuto, Neroli Meadows, Nathan Brown
1116 SEN	Victoria	Anthony Hudson, Matt Granland	Garry Lyon, Mick Malthouse, Danny Frawley
3AW	Victoria	Tim Lane, Tony Leonard	Jimmy Bartel
5AA	South Australia	David Wildy, Stephen Rowe	Mark Bickley
6PR	Western Australia	Adam Papalia, Mark Readings	Brad Hardie
KROCK	Geelong, Victoria	Tom King, Darren Berry	Unknown
AFL Nation	National (regional only)	Stephen Quartermain, Peter Donegan	Unknown
NIRS	National (regional only)	Bary Denner, Peter Cardamone	Unknown

=== International coverage ===
Region	Rights holder(s)
Asia Pacific	Australia Plus
Canada	TSN2
China	GZTV
India	Australia Plus
(Republic of Ireland) Ireland	BT Sport, ESPN
(Middle East and North Africa) Middle East	Orbit Showtime Network
New Zealand	Sky Sports, TVNZ
Russia	VIASAT
United Kingdom	BT Sport, ESPN
United States	Fox Soccer Plus
Worldwide	WatchAFL.com.au
