= 2016 AFL Under 18 Championships =

Youth Australian rules football competition

- Teams: 9

Division 1
- Teams: 5
- Champions: Victoria Metro
- Larke Medal: Jack Graham

Division 2
- Teams: 4
- Champions: NSW/ACT
- Hunter Harrison Medal: Jack Bowes

The 2016 NAB AFL Under 18 Championships was the 21st edition of the AFL Under 18 Championships. A new format saw nine teams compete in the championships with four teams competing in division two; Northern Territory, NSW/ACT, Queensland, and Tasmania, and five teams compete in division one; the Allies, South Australia, Victoria Metro, Victoria Country, and Western Australia, with Australian Alliance comprising the best players in division two. Victoria Metro won the division one title, with South Australian captain, Jack Graham, winning the Larke Medal as the division one best player. NSW/ACT were the champions of division two, with Queensland midfielder, Jack Bowes, winning the Hunter Harrison Medal as the best player in division two.

== Fixture ==
=== Division 1 ===
==== Round 1 ====
	Round 1
Saturday, 4 June (10:30am)	South Australia 15.11 (101)	def.	Allies 8.9 (57)	AAMI Stadium	Report
Sunday, 5 June (11:00am)	Western Australia 19.11 (125)	def.	Victoria Country 10.4 (64)	Domain Stadium	Report
	Bye; Victoria Metro

==== Round 2 ====
	Round 2
Sunday, 12 June (11:20am)	South Australia 12.10 (82)	def.	Western Australia 6.9 (45)	AAMI Stadium	Report
Monday, 13 June (12:00pm)	Victoria Country 14.8 (92)	def. by	Victoria Metro 14.10 (94)	Simonds Stadium	Report
	Bye; Allies

==== Round 3 ====
	Round 3
Saturday, 18 June (11:20am)	Western Australia 10.9 (69)	def.	Allies 7.10 (52)	Domain Stadium	Report
Sunday, 19 June (10:45am)	South Australia 10.6 (66)	def. by	Victoria Metro 9.15 (69)	AAMI Stadium	Report
	Bye; Victoria Country

==== Round 4 ====
	Round 4
Friday, 24 June (12:35pm)	South Australia 11.10 (76)	def.	Victoria Country 9.11 (65)	Etihad Stadium	Report
Friday, 24 June (2:35pm)	Allies 8.12 (60)	def. by	Victoria Metro 10.14 (74)	Etihad Stadium	Report
	Bye; Western Australia

==== Round 5 ====
	Round 5
Wednesday, 29 June (3:05pm)	Victoria Metro 12.9 (81)	def.	Western Australia 8.10 (58)	Simonds Stadium	Report
Wednesday, 29 June (5:05pm)	Victoria Country 10.6 (66)	def. by	Allies 10.10 (70)	Simonds Stadium	Report
	Bye; South Australia

=== Division 2 ===
==== Round 1 ====
	Round 1
Friday, 6 May (6:30pm)	Northern Territory 17.12 (114)	def.	Tasmania 6.9 (45)	TIO Stadium	Report
Sunday, 8 May (11:00am)	NSW/ACT 18.6 (114)	def.	Queensland 9.13 (67)	Blacktown International Sportspark	Report

==== Round 2 ====
	Round 2
Saturday, 14 May (10:00am)	Northern Territory 7.12 (54)	def.	Queensland 22.9 (141)	Blundstone Arena	Report
Saturday, 14 May (12:15pm)	Tasmania 5.6 (36)	def. by	NSW/ACT 21.11 (137)	Blundstone Arena	Report

==== Round 3 ====
	Round 3
Sunday, 22 May (11:00am)	Queensland 18.11 (119)	def.	Tasmania 4.7 (31)	Metricon Stadium	Report
Sunday, 22 May (1:30pm)	NSW/ACT 23.20 (158)	def.	Northern Territory 5.9 (39)	Metricon Stadium	Report

== All-Australian team ==
The All-Australian team was selected by Kevin Sheehan (AFL national and international talent manager), Brenton Sanderson (AFL Academy head coach), Michael Ablett (AFL talent football manager), Steve Conole (recruiting manager, Brisbane Lions), Merv Keane (recruiting manager, Essendon), David Walls (recruiting manager, Fremantle), Simon Dalrymple (recruiting manager, Western Bulldogs).

2016 Under 18 All-Australian team
B:	Alex Villis (SA)	Jack Maibaum (VM)	Sam Walker (SA)
HB:	Andrew McGrath (VM)	Brennan Cox (SA)	Harry Perryman (All)
C:	Will Brodie (VC)	Hugh McCluggage (VC)	Jack Bowes (All)
HF:	Daniel Venables (VM)	Josh Battle (VC)	Dylan Clarke (VM)
F:	Callum Brown (VM)	Pat Kerr (VM)	Tim Taranto (VM)
Foll:	Tim English (WA)	Jack Graham (SA)	Zac Fisher (WA)
Int:	Jonty Scharenberg (SA)	Kobe Mutch (All)	Sam Hayes (VM)
Int:	Jordan Gallucci (VM)		
Coach:	David Flood (VM)		
