= 2016 Richmond Football Club season =

Richmond Football Club
2016 season
- President: Peggy O'Neal^{(3rd season)}
- Coach: Damien Hardwick^{(7th season)}
- Captains: Trent Cotchin^{(4th season)}
- Home ground: MCG
- Pre-season: (1-2)
- AFL season: 13th^{(8-14)}
- Finals series: DNQ
- Jack Dyer Medal: Dustin Martin
- Leading goalkicker: Jack Riewoldt^{(48)}
- Highest home attendance: 75,706^{(round 1 vs. Carlton)}
- Lowest home attendance: 27,077^{(round 6 vs. Port Adelaide)}
- Average home attendance: 41,155^{(▼8,722 / ▼17.5%)}
- Club membership: 72,278^{(▲1,469 / ▲2.07%)}

The 2016 season marked the 109th season in which the Richmond Football Club participated in the AFL/VFL.

== 2015 off-season list changes ==
=== Retirements and delistings ===
Player	Reason	Club games	Career games	Ref
Chris Newman	Retired	268	268	
Nathan Foley	Retired	154	154	
Ricky Petterd	Retired	30	84	
Matt Thomas	Retired	15	102	
Chris Knights	Retired	6	102	
Matt Dea	Delisted	31	31	
Nathan Gordon	Delisted	21	23	
Matt McDonough	Delisted	10	10	
Matthew Arnot	Delisted	8	8	

=== Trades ===
Date	Gained	Lost	Trade partner	Ref
16 October	Jacob Townsend	Pick 70	Greater Western Sydney	
16 October	Pick 120	Pick 70	Greater Western Sydney	
20 October	Pick 19	Pick 31	Gold Coast	
20 October	Pick 19	2016 2nd round pick	Gold Coast	
22 October	Chris Yarran	Pick 19	Carlton	

Note: All traded picks are indicative and do not reflect final selection position

=== Free agency ===
Date	Player	Free agent type	Former club	New club	Compensation	Ref
6 November	Andrew Moore	Delisted	Port Adelaide	Richmond	-	

=== National draft ===
Round	Overall pick	Player	State	Position	Team from	League from	Ref
1	15	Daniel Rioli	VIC	Small-Forward	North Ballarat Rebels	TAC Cup	
3	50	Oleg Markov	SA	Half-Forward	North Adelaide	SANFL	
5	67	Nathan Broad	WA	Defender	Swan Districts	WAFL	

=== Rookie draft ===
Round	Overall pick	Player	State	Position	Team from	League from	Ref
1	12	Callum Moore	VIC	Tall Forward	Calder Cannons	TAC Cup	
2	30	Mabior Chol	QLD	Tall Forward	Aspley	NEAFL	
3	47	Adam Marcon	VIC	Midfielder	Williamstown	VFL	

== 2016 squad ==
Richmond Football Club
Senior list		Rookie list	Coaching staff
1 Nick Vlastuin; 2 Dylan Grimes; 3 Brett Deledio (vc); 4 Dustin Martin; 5 Brandon Ellis; 6 Shaun Grigg; 7 Ben Lennon; 8 Jack Riewoldt; 9 Trent Cotchin (c); 10 Shane Edwards; 11 Jake Batchelor; 12 David Astbury; 13 Chris Yarran; 14 Bachar Houli; 15 Andrew Moore; 16 Shaun Hampson; 17 Daniel Rioli; 18 Alex Rance; 20 Ivan Maric (vc); 21 Jacob Townsend	23 Kane Lambert; 24 Ben Griffiths; 25 Troy Chaplin; 26 Anthony Miles; 27 Sam Lloyd; 28 Taylor Hunt; 29 Ty Vickery; 30 Reece Conca; 31 Oleg Markov; 32 Corey Ellis; 33 Kamdyn McIntosh; 34 Liam McBean; 35 Nathan Broad; 37 Connor Menadue; 38 Steven Morris; 39 Nathan Drummond; 40 Dan Butler; 42 Reece McKenzie; 43 Todd Elton	36 Callum Moore; 41 Mabior Chol; 44 Adam Marcon; 45 Jayden Short; 46 Jason Castagna; 47 Ivan Soldo (B)	Head coach: Damien Hardwick; Assistant coaches: Brendon Lade (midfield/stoppages); Ross Smith (defence); Ben Rutten (defence); Mark P. Williams (offense); Greg Mellor (forward); Mark M. Williams (senior development); Ryan Ferguson (development); Andrew McQualter (development); Craig McRae (VFL coach); Legend: (c) Captain(s); (vc) Vice-captain(s); Long-term injury list; Upgraded rookie; (B) Category B rookie; (vet) Veterans list; (ret) Retired; Updated: 25 August 2016; Source(s): Playing list, Coaching staff

== 2016 season ==
=== Pre-season ===
Match	Date	Score	Opponent	Opponent's score	Result	Home/away	Venue	Attendance
1	Friday, 19 February 4:10pm	0.4.6 (30)	Fremantle	0.14.6 (90)	Lost by 60 points	Away	Rushton Park	7,500
2	Saturday, 27 February 1:35pm	1.15.5 (104)	Hawthorn	0.4.9 (33)	Won by 71 points	Home	Holm Park, Beaconsfield	6,384
3	Thursday, 10 March 7:10pm	1.4.12 (45)	Port Adelaide	0.13.15 (93)	Lost by 48 points	Home	Etihad Stadium	6,584

Source:AFL

=== Home and away season ===
Round	Date	Score	Opponent	Opponent's score	Result	Home/away	Venue	Attendance	Ladder
1	Thursday, 24 March 7:20pm	14.8 (92)	Carlton	12.11 (83)	Won by 9 points	Home	MCG	75,706	7th
2	Friday, 1 April 7:50pm	12.14 (86)	Collingwood	13.9 (87)	Lost by 1 point	Away	MCG	72,761	10th
3	Saturday, 9 April 2:10pm	13.14 (92)	Adelaide	19.14 (128)	Lost by 36 points	Home	Etihad Stadium	29,951	12th
4	Friday, 15 April 6:10pm	9.3 (57)	West Coast	18.17 (125)	Lost by 68 points	Away	Subiaco Oval	38,860	13th
5	Sunday, 24 April 7:10pm	14.12 (96)	Melbourne	20.9 (129)	Lost by 33 points	Away	MCG	59,968	14th
6	Saturday, 30 April 7:25pm	8.11 (59)	Port Adelaide	13.16 (94)	Lost by 35 points	Home	MCG	27,077	15th
7	Friday, 6 May 7:50pm	13.12 (90)	Hawthorn	21.10 (136)	Lost by 46 points	Home	MCG	49,678	15th
8	Saturday, 14 May 7:25pm	14.17 (101)	Sydney	15.10 (100)	Won by 1 point	Home	MCG	36,014	15th
9	Saturday, 21 May 5:40pm	11.17 (83)	Fremantle	6.9 (45)	Won by 38 points	Away	Subiaco Oval	20,184	14th
10	Saturday, 28 May 7:25pm	16.9 (105)	Essendon	10.7 (67)	Won by 39 points	Away	MCG	56,948	14th
11	Friday, 3 June 7:50pm	7.12 (54)	North Melbourne	18.16 (124)	Lost by 70 points	Away	Bellerive Oval	17,844	14th
12	Sunday, 12 June 3:20pm	17.12 (114)	Gold Coast	15.7 (97)	Won by 17 points	Home	MCG	30,448	13th
13	BYE								13th
14	Saturday, 25 June 1:40pm	17.15 (117)	Brisbane Lions	11.9 (75)	Won by 42 points	Home	MCG	28,883	11th
15	Friday, 1 July 7:20pm	8.8 (56)	Port Adelaide	14.10 (94)	Lost by 38 points	Away	Adelaide Oval	37,848	12th
16	Saturday, 9 July 7:25pm	11.9 (75)	Western Bulldogs	12.13 (85)	Lost by 10 points	Away	Etihad Stadium	39,679	13th
17	Saturday, 16 July 1:40pm	16.6 (102)	Essendon	11.17 (83)	Won by 19 points	Home	MCG	44,908	13th
18	Sunday, 24 July 3:20pm	5.14 (44)	Hawthorn	16.18 (114)	Lost by 70 points	Away	MCG	51,892	13th
19	Saturday, 30 July 1:45pm	3.5 (23)	Greater Western Sydney	17.9 (111)	Lost by 88 points	Away	Manuka Oval	14,974	13th
20	Friday, 5 August 7:50pm	14.8 (92)	Collingwood	11.11 (77)	Won by 15 points	Home	MCG	49,122	13th
21	Sunday, 14 August 3:20pm	12.16 (78)	Geelong	10.22 (82)	Lost by 4 points	Home	MCG	45,667	13th
22	Saturday, 20 August 2:10pm	6.10 (46)	St Kilda	7.13 (55)	Lost by 9 points	Home	MCG	35,255	13th
23	Saturday, 27 August 4:35pm	7.9 (51)	Sydney	23.14 (164)	Lost by 113 points	Away	SCG	36,570	13th

Source: AFL Tables

== Ladder ==
Pos	Team	Pld	W	L	D	PF	PA	PP	Pts	Qualification
1	Sydney	22	17	5	0	2221	1469	151.2	68	2016 finals
2	Geelong	22	17	5	0	2235	1554	143.8	68	2016 finals
3	Hawthorn	22	17	5	0	2134	1800	118.6	68	2016 finals
4	Greater Western Sydney	22	16	6	0	2380	1663	143.1	64	2016 finals
5	Adelaide	22	16	6	0	2483	1795	138.3	64	2016 finals
6	West Coast	22	16	6	0	2181	1678	130.0	64	2016 finals
7	Western Bulldogs (P)	22	15	7	0	1857	1609	115.4	60	2016 finals
8	North Melbourne	22	12	10	0	1956	1859	105.2	48	2016 finals
9	St Kilda	22	12	10	0	1953	2041	95.7	48	
10	Port Adelaide	22	10	12	0	2055	1939	106.0	40	
11	Melbourne	22	10	12	0	1944	1991	97.6	40	
12	Collingwood	22	9	13	0	1910	1998	95.6	36	
13	Richmond	22	8	14	0	1713	2155	79.5	32	
14	Carlton	22	7	15	0	1568	1978	79.3	28	
15	Gold Coast	22	6	16	0	1778	2273	78.2	24	
16	Fremantle	22	4	18	0	1574	2119	74.3	16	
17	Brisbane Lions	22	3	19	0	1770	2872	61.6	12	
18	Essendon	22	3	19	0	1437	2356	61.0	12	

Source: AFL
Rules for classification: 1) points; 2) percentage; 3) number of points for.
(P) Premiers

== Awards ==
=== League awards ===
==== All-Australian team ====
	Player	Position	Appearance
Named	Alex Rance	Full Back	3rd
Named	Dustin Martin	Interchange	1st

==== Brownlow Medal tally ====
Player	3 vote games	2 vote games	1 vote games	Total votes	Place
Dustin Martin	6	2	3	25	3rd
Trent Cotchin	0	3	3	9	42nd
Alex Rance	1	2	0	7	50th
Ben Griffiths	1	0	1	4	86th
Brandon Ellis	0	1	0	2	128th
Jack Riewoldt	0	1	0	2	128th
Anthony Miles	0	0	1	1	166th
Corey Ellis	0	0	1	1	166th
Shaun Grigg	0	0	1	1	166th
Total	8	9	10	52	-

==== Rising Star ====
Nominations:

Round	Player	Ref
22	Daniel Rioli	

==== 22 Under 22 team ====
	Player	Position	Appearance
Nominated	Nick Vlastuin	-	-

=== Club awards ===
==== Jack Dyer Medal ====
Position	Player	Votes	Medal
1st	Dustin Martin	62	Jack Dyer Medal
2nd	Alex Rance	61	Jack Titus Medal
3rd	Trent Cotchin	51	Maurie Fleming Medal
4th	Jack Riewoldt	43	Fred Swift Medal
5th	Shaun Grigg	35	Kevin Bartlett Medal
6th	Anthony Miles	31	
7th	Dylan Grimes	30	
7th	Brandon Ellis	30	
9th	Nick Vlastuin	29	
10th	Brett Deledio	28	

==== Michael Roach Medal ====
Position	Player	Goals
1st	Jack Riewoldt	48
2nd	Sam Lloyd	35
3rd	Ty Vickery	26
4th	Shane Edwards	15
5th	Ben Griffiths	14

== Reserves ==
The 2016 season marked the third consecutive year the Richmond Football club ran a stand-alone reserves team in the Victorian Football League (VFL). Richmond senior and rookie-listed players who were not selected to play in the AFL side were eligible to play for the team alongside a small squad of VFL-only listed players. The team finished ninth out of 15 participating clubs, with a record of nine win and nine losses. Each of the club's nine home matches were played at the Punt Road Oval.

=== Playing squad ===
Richmond Football Club (reserves)
Playing list		Coaching staff
51 Sam Darley(c); 52 Anthony Scott; 53 Jarred Ellis; 54 Jacob Ballard; 55 Ryan Bathie; 56 Jonathan Daggian; 57 Jordan Perry; 58 Jake Aarts; 59 Ash Morris; 60 Tom Langford; 64 Thomas Silvestro; 65 Ryan Gale	66 Gerald Gleeson; 67 Luke Conca; 68 Matthew Troutbeck; 70 Andrew McQualter; 71 Nick Mellington; 72 Ryan Thomson; 73 Tom Couch; 74 Tyson Kruse; 75 Kelvin Williams; 78 Daniel Coffield; 79 Sam Hibbins; 80 Antony Forato	Head coach: Craig McRae; Assistant coaches: Leigh Clarke (forwards); Andrew McQualter (midfield); Ryan Ferguson (backline); Tom Hunter (midfield assistant); Marc Sophoulis (development); Legend: (c) Captain(s); (vc) Vice-captain(s); Updated: 10 October 2016; Source(s): Playing list, Coaching staff
