= 2015 Richmond Football Club season =

Richmond Football Club
2015 season
- President: Peggy O'Neal^{(2nd season)}
- Coach: Damien Hardwick^{(6th season)}
- Captains: Trent Cotchin^{(3rd season)}
- Home ground: MCG
- Pre-season: (1-2)
- AFL season: 5th^{(15-7)}
- Finals series: 7th^{(0-1)}
- Jack Dyer Medal: Alex Rance
- Leading goalkicker: Jack Riewoldt^{(54)}
- Highest home attendance: 83,804^{(round 9 vs. Essendon)}
- Lowest home attendance: 35,968^{(round 14 vs. Greater Western Sydney)}
- Average home attendance: 49,876^{(▲6,681 / ▲15.5%)}
- Club membership: 70,809^{(▲4,687 / ▲7.09%)}

The 2015 season marked the 108th season in which the Richmond Football Club participated in the AFL/VFL.

== 2014 off-season list changes ==
=== Retirements and delistings ===
Player	Reason	Club games	Career games	Ref
Daniel Jackson	Retired	156	156	
Jake King	Retired	107	107	
Matthew Arnot	Rookie Listed	4	4	
Brad Helbig	Delisted	16	16	
Aaron Edwards	Delisted	12	94	
Brett O'Hanlon	Delisted	9	9	
Orren Stephenson	Delisted	7	15	
Todd Banfield	Delisted	0	53	
Cadeyn Williams	Delisted	0	0	
Ben Darrou	Delisted	0	0	

=== Free agency ===
Date	Player	Free agent type	Former club	New club	Compensation	Ref
2 November	Taylor Hunt	Delisted	Geelong	Richmond	—	

=== National draft ===
Round	Overall pick	Player	State	Position	Team from	League from	Ref
1	12	Corey Ellis	VIC	Midfielder	Western Jets	TAC Cup	
2	33	Connor Menadue	VIC	Midfielder	Western Jets	TAC Cup	
3	52	Nathan Drummond	VIC	Midfielder	Murray Bushrangers	TAC Cup	
4	67	Dan Butler	VIC	Midfielder	North Ballarat Rebels	TAC Cup	
5	77	Reece McKenzie	VIC	Tall Forward	Northern Knights	TAC Cup	

=== Rookie draft ===
Round	Overall pick	Player	State	Position	Team from	League from	Ref
1	11	Jayden Short	VIC	Small Forward	Northern Knights	TAC Cup	
2	29	Jason Castagna	VIC	Midfielder	Northern Knights	TAC Cup	
3	46	Kane Lambert	VIC	Midfielder	Williamstown	VFL	
4	61	Matthew Arnot	VIC	Midfielder	Richmond	AFL	
5	68	Ivan Soldo^{(B)}	VIC	Ruck	3-year non-registered player		

== 2015 squad ==
Richmond Football Club
Senior list		Rookie list	Coaching staff
1 Chris Newman; 2 Dylan Grimes; 3 Brett Deledio (vc); 4 Dustin Martin; 5 Brandon Ellis; 6 Shaun Grigg; 7 Matt Dea; 8 Jack Riewoldt; 9 Trent Cotchin (c); 10 Shane Edwards; 11 Jake Batchelor; 12 David Astbury; 13 Ricky Petterd; 14 Bachar Houli; 15 Chris Knights; 16 Shaun Hampson; 18 Alex Rance; 20 Ivan Maric (vc); 22 Nathan Gordon; 24 Ben Griffiths	25 Troy Chaplin; 26 Anthony Miles; 27 Sam Lloyd; 28 Taylor Hunt; 29 Ty Vickery; 30 Reece Conca; 31 Nick Vlastuin; 32 Corey Ellis; 33 Kamdyn McIntosh; 34 Liam McBean; 35 Ben Lennon; 36 Matt McDonough; 37 Connor Menadue; 38 Steven Morris; 39 Nathan Drummond; 40 Dan Butler; 41 Nathan Foley; 42 Reece McKenzie; 43 Todd Elton	44 Matthew Arnot; 45 Jayden Short; 46 Jason Castagna; 47 Ivan Soldo (B); 48 Kane Lambert	Head coach: Damien Hardwick; Assistant coaches: Brendon Lade (midfield/stoppages); Ross Smith (defence); Ben Rutten (defence); Mark P. Williams (offense); Greg Mellor (forward); Mark M. Williams (senior development); Ryan Ferguson (development); Andrew McQualter (development); Tim Clarke (VFL coach); Legend: (c) Captain(s); (vc) Vice-captain(s); Long-term injury list; Upgraded rookie; (B) Category B rookie; (vet) Veterans list; (ret) Retired; Updated: 18 August 2016; Source(s): Playing list, Coaching staff

== 2015 season ==
=== Pre-season ===
Match	Date	Score	Opponent	Opponent's score	Result	Home/away	Venue	Attendance
1	Saturday, 28 February 4:40pm	1.9.4 (67)	Western Bulldogs	0.12.17 (89)	Lost by 22 points	Away	Whitten Oval	9,513
2	Saturday, 14 March 4:40pm	1.14.10 (103)	Port Adelaide	0.5.7 (37)	Won by 66 points	Home	Lavington Sports Ground	8,451
3	Saturday, 21 March 1:10pm	2.12.16 (106)	North Melbourne	3.13.15 (120)	Lost by 14 points	Home	Etihad Stadium	9,327

Source:AFL

=== Home and away season ===
Round	Date	Score	Opponent	Opponent's score	Result	Home/away	Venue	Attendance	Ladder
1	Thursday, 2 April 7:20pm	15.15 (105)	Carlton	11.12 (78)	Won by 27 points	Away	MCG	83,493	3rd
2	Saturday, 11 April 1:45pm	9.12 (66)	Western Bulldogs	12.13 (85)	Lost by 19 points	Home	MCG	49,945	9th
3	Saturday, 18 April 7:20pm	21.11 (137)	Brisbane Lions	8.10 (58)	Won by 79 points	Away	The Gabba	22,441	5th
4	Friday, 24 April 7:50pm	6.15 (51)	Melbourne	12.11 (83)	Lost by 32 points	Home	MCG	58,175	9th
5	Saturday, 2 May 1:45pm	11.10 (76)	Geelong	12.13 (85)	Lost by 9 points	Home	MCG	45,228	11th
6	Saturday, 9 May 1:45pm	10.14 (74)	North Melbourne	16.13 (109)	Lost by 35 points	Away	Bellerive Oval	17,544	13th
7	Sunday, 17 May 3:20pm	16.9 (105)	Collingwood	15.10 (100)	Won by 5 points	Home	MCG	59,034	10th
8	Sunday, 24 May 4:10pm	11.10 (76)	Port Adelaide	5.13 (43)	Won by 33 points	Away	Adelaide Oval	44,451	8th
9	Saturday, 30 May 7:20pm	10.12 (72)	Essendon	8.11 (59)	Won by 13 points	Home	MCG	83,804	8th
10	Friday, 5 June 6:10pm	15.7 (97)	Fremantle	10.10 (70)	Won by 27 points	Away	Subiaco Oval	38,091	8th
11	BYE								8th
12	Friday, 19 June 7:50pm	10.10 (70)	West Coast	13.12 (90)	Lost by 20 points	Home	MCG	45,178	8th
13	Friday, 26 June 7:50pm	14.11 (95)	Sydney	11.11 (77)	Won by 18 points	Away	SCG	37,579	8th
14	Saturday, 4 July 1:40pm	10.18 (78)	Greater Western Sydney	10.9 (69)	Won by 9 points	Home	MCG	35,968	6th
15	Friday, 10 July 7:50pm	10.11 (71)	Carlton	5.11 (41)	Won by 30 points	Home	MCG	52,564	5th
16	Sunday, 19 July 4:40pm	13.11 (89)	St Kilda	13.13 (73)	Won by 16 points	Away	Etihad Stadium	45,722	5th
17	Saturday, 25 July 4:35pm	10.18 (78)	Fremantle	12.10 (82)	Lost by 4 points	Home	MCG	39,777	5th
18	Friday, 31 July 7:50pm	10.11 (71)	Hawthorn	7.11 (53)	Won by 18 points	Away	MCG	66,305	6th
19	Friday, 7 August 7:20pm	8.4 (52)	Adelaide	11.22 (88)	Lost by 36 points	Away	Adelaide Oval	49,116	7th
20	Sunday, 16 August 1:10m	22.6 (138)	Gold Coast	18.7 (55)	Won by 83 points	Home	MCG	38,508	6th
21	Saturday, 22 August 1:45pm	23.9 (147)	Collingwood	7.14 (56)	Won by 91 points	Away	MCG	63,178	5th
22	Saturday, 29 August 7:20pm	10.14 (74)	Essendon	7.5 (47)	Won by 27 points	Away	MCG	37,864	5th
23	Friday, 4 September 7:50pm	16.12 (108)	North Melbourne	10.7 (67)	Won by 41 points	Home	Etihad Stadium	40,461	5th

Source: AFL Tables

=== Finals ===
Match	Date	Score	Opponent	Opponent's Score	Result	Home/Away	Venue	Attendance
Elimination Final	Sunday, 13 September 3:20pm	14.4 (88)	North Melbourne	15.15 (105)	Lost by 17 points	Home	MCG	90,186

Source: AFL Tables

== Ladder ==
Pos	Team	Pld	W	L	D	PF	PA	PP	Pts	Qualification
1	Fremantle	22	17	5	0	1857	1564	118.7	68	Finals series
2	West Coast	22	16	5	1	2330	1572	148.2	66	Finals series
3	Hawthorn (P)	22	16	6	0	2452	1548	158.4	64	Finals series
4	Sydney	22	16	6	0	2006	1578	127.1	64	Finals series
5	Richmond	22	15	7	0	1930	1568	123.1	60	Finals series
6	Western Bulldogs	22	14	8	0	2101	1825	115.1	56	Finals series
7	Adelaide	21	13	8	0	2107	1821	115.7	54 (Note: The round 14 match between Adelaide and Geelong was cancelled due to the death of Adelaide coach Phil Walsh, and both teams were awarded two premiership points each.)	Finals series
8	North Melbourne	22	13	9	0	2062	1937	106.5	52	Finals series
9	Port Adelaide	22	12	10	0	2002	1874	106.8	48	
10	Geelong	21	11	9	1	1853	1833	101.1	48	
11	Greater Western Sydney	22	11	11	0	1872	1891	99.0	44	
12	Collingwood	22	10	12	0	1972	1856	106.3	40	
13	Melbourne	22	7	15	0	1573	2044	77.0	28	
14	St Kilda	22	6	15	1	1695	2162	78.4	26	
15	Essendon	22	6	16	0	1580	2134	74.0	24	
16	Gold Coast	22	4	17	1	1633	2240	72.9	18	
17	Brisbane Lions	22	4	18	0	1557	2306	67.5	16	
18	Carlton	22	4	18	0	1525	2354	64.8	16	

Rules for classification: 1) points; 2) percentage; 3) number of points for.
(P) Premiers

== Awards ==
=== League awards ===
==== All-Australian team ====
	Player	Position	Appearance
Named	Alex Rance	Full back	2nd
Named	Jack Riewoldt	Centre half-forward	2nd
Named	Brett Deledio	Bench	2nd
Nominated	Dustin Martin	-	-

==== Rising Star ====
Nominations:

Round	Player	Ref
1	Kamdyn McIntosh	
22	Ben Lennon	

==== 22 Under 22 team ====
	Player	Position	Appearance
Named	Brandon Ellis	Bench	3rd
Nominated	Nick Vlastuin	-	-

==== Brownlow Medal tally ====
Player	3 vote games	2 vote games	1 vote games	Total votes	Place
Dustin Martin	3	5	2	21	7th
Trent Cotchin	3	3	2	17	11th
Anthony Miles	3	0	0	9	35th
Alex Rance	1	2	1	8	40th
Brett Deledio	2	0	2	8	40th
Brandon Ellis	0	3	1	7	50th
Shane Edwards	1	1	1	6	63rd
Taylor Hunt	1	0	1	4	92nd
Ty Vickery	1	0	1	4	92nd
Jack Riewoldt	1	0	0	3	109th
Ivan Maric	0	1	1	3	109th
Bachar Houli	0	1	0	2	147th
Kamdyn McIntosh	0	1	0	2	147th
Total	16	17	12	94	-

=== Club awards ===
==== Jack Dyer Medal ====
Position	Player	Votes	Medal
1st	Alex Rance	76	Jack Dyer Medal
2nd	Dustin Martin	60	Jack Titus Medal
3rd	Brett Deledio	54	Maurie Fleming Medal
4th	Anthony Miles	50	Fred Swift Medal
5th	Jack Riewoldt	48	Kevin Bartlett Medal
6th	Trent Cotchin	47	
6th	Nick Vlastuin	47	
8th	Bachar Houli	46	
9th	Shaun Grigg	44	
9th	Dylan Grimes	44	

==== Michael Roach Medal ====
Position	Player	Goals
1st	Jack Riewoldt	54
2nd	Ty Vickery	31
3rd	Brett Deledio	27
4th	Dustin Martin	24
5th	Shaun Grigg	16

== Reserves ==
For the second consecutive season, the Richmond Football club ran a stand-alone reserves team in the Victorian Football League (VFL). Richmond senior and rookie-listed players who were not selected to play in the AFL side were eligible to play for the team alongside a small squad of VFL-only listed players. The team finished 13th out of 15 participating clubs, with a record of five wins and thirteen losses. Each of the club's nine home matches were played at the Punt Road Oval. Senior listed player Matt Dea won the Guanane Medal as the VFL side's best and fairest, while another senior listed player Liam McBean was awarded the Jim 'Frosty' Miller Medal for the league's leading goalkicker.
