= Callum Moore (Australian footballer) =

Australian rules footballer (born 1996)

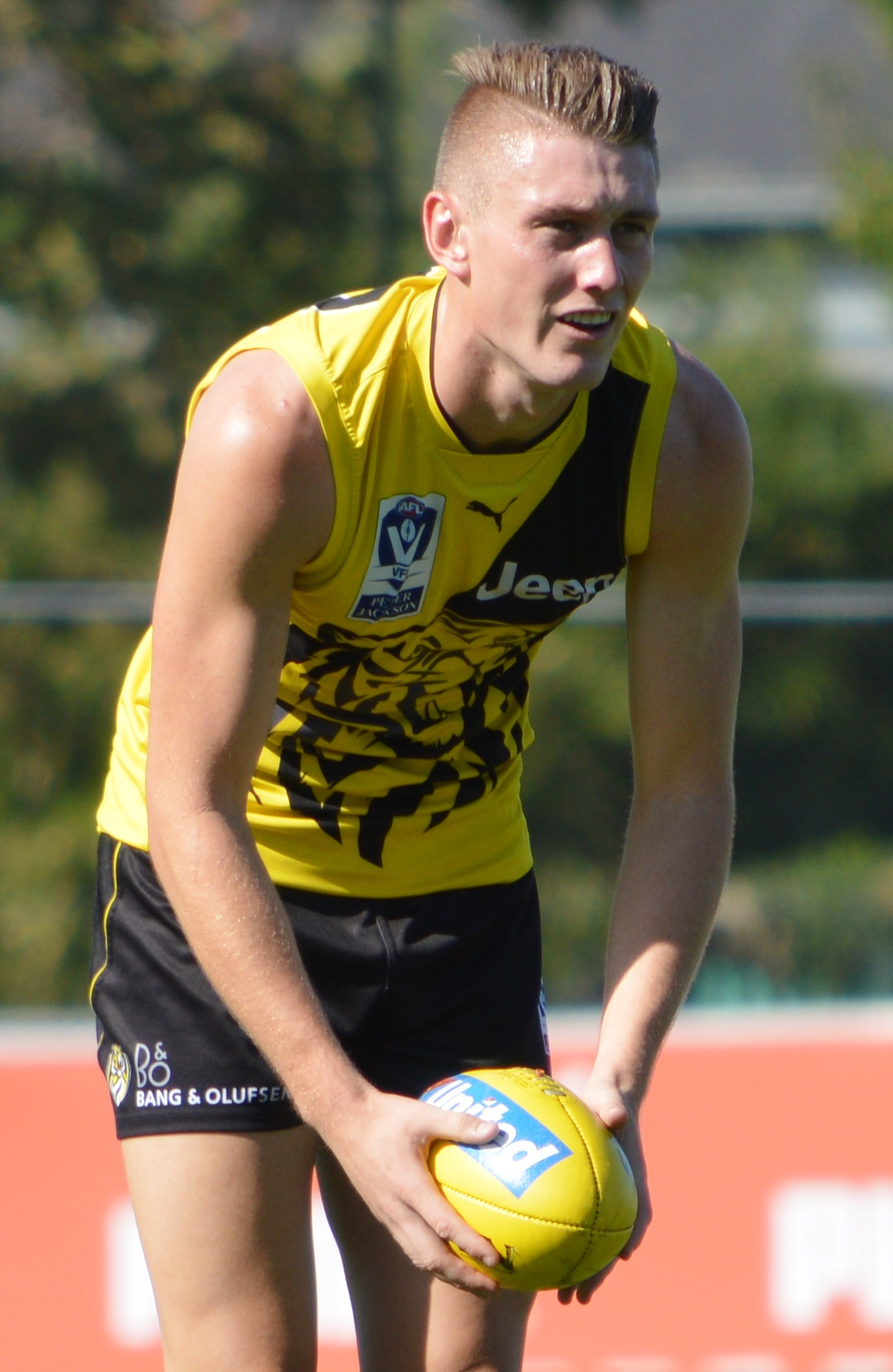
- Moore playing for Richmond's VFL side in March 2018

Personal information
- Nickname: Cal
- Born: 3 September 1996 (age 30)
- Original teams: Calder Cannons (TAC Cup); Aberfeldie (EDFL)
- Draft: No. 12, 2016 Rookie Draft: Richmond
- Debut: Round 22, 2016, Richmond vs. St Kilda, at MCG
- Height: 193 cm (6 ft 4 in)
- Weight: 92 kg (203 lb)
- Position: Tall forward

Playing career^{1}
Years	Club	Games (Goals)
2016–2019	Richmond	8 (5)
2020	Carlton	2 (0)
Total		10 (5)
- ^{1} Playing statistics correct to the end of 2020.

Career highlights
- VFL: VFL premiership player: 2019

Callum Moore (born 3 September 1996) is a professional Australian rules footballer who played in the Australian Football League (AFL), including eight matches over a four-year tenure with Richmond and two matches over one season with Carlton. While at Richmond in 2019, he won a VFL premiership while playing reserves grade football.

== Early life and junior football ==
Moore is the son of New Zealander parents, but spent his teenage years in the Melbourne suburb of Essendon where he played junior football with Aberfeldie in the Essendon District Football League. In addition to football, Moore has an athletic background in basketball and rugby union.

Moore soon joined the Calder Cannons TAC Cup development squad but chose to give up the sport and focus on basketball while with that club's under 16's side. That decision would be reversed eventually however, with Moore returning to football with Calder during his final year of high school after trialing with the local Coburg representative basketball side. He played five matches for the Cannons after that mid-season return in 2014, including in the club's grand final loss to Oakleigh.

After finishing high school Moore worked with his father's business as a landscaper while playing football with Calder in his final year of eligibility. In early the early part of that 2015 season Moore suffered a broken wrist, limiting his output for much of the year. He played nine matches, kicking 13 goals and averaging 13 disposals, 10.7 hitouts and 3.4 marks per game as a tall utility. That same year Moore represented the Victorian Metro side at the Under 18 National Championships. He played four matches, recording averages of four marks and 2.8 inside-50s. Moore earned an invite to the 2015 AFL Draft Combine and while there recorded top-10 scores in the running vertical jump (86 cm) and 20-metre sprint (2.91 seconds) tests.

== AFL career ==
=== Richmond (2016-2019) ===
Moore was passed over for selection in the 2015 AFL draft before being selected three days later in the 2016 rookie draft by Richmond with the club's first selection and twelfth selection overall.

He began the 2016 season playing for Richmond's reserves side in the VFL. Moore was upgraded from the club's rookie list in August 2016, as a replacement for the injured Jake Batchelor. Moore made his AFL debut in a nine-point loss against St Kilda in Round 22, 2016 at the Melbourne Cricket Ground. He kicked his first career goal on debut, along with five disposals and three tackles. He also played in the club's final match that season, against Sydney in Round 23. He finished the season with one goal to his name and an average of six disposals per game from his two AFL matches.

Moore did not play senior football in 2017, instead continuing his development by switching between forward and back line roles in Richmond's VFL side. He suffered a partial syndesmosis sprain in his left ankle in late May, and missed six weeks of football as a result. In Richmond's VFL finals campaign, Moore proved a key player, kicking four goals in a preliminary final win which saw his team into the grand final. He played in what was ultimately a losing side the following week against Port Melbourne. Moore finished the reserves season having kicked 18 goals in 17 matches.

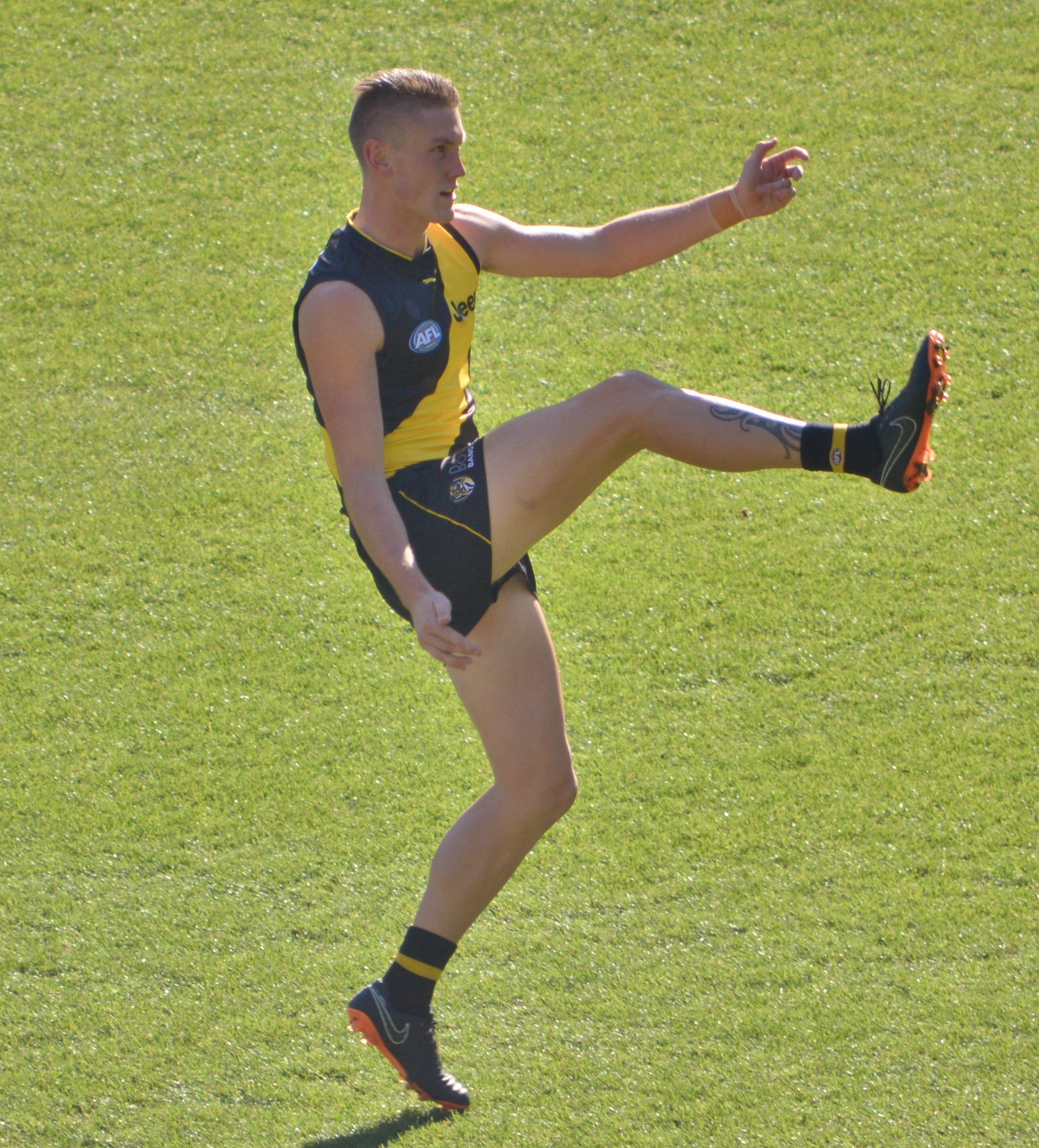
Moore kicks for goal during the pre-match warm-up in round 10, 2018

Moore played his first football of 2018 in a six-club AFLX exhibition tournament alongside many of Richmond's younger players. Following that he was named as an emergency for the club's first official pre-season match before earning selection in the club's second and final match of that tournament two weeks later. Moore played in only the second half of that match against North Melbourne but still managed to score two goals, showing his potential to play as a second tall-forward alongside Jack Riewoldt come the start of the season-proper. He was ultimately unselected for senior football in round 1, but was named as an emergency for that season-opening match against Carlton. Moore would continue to wait for an AFL berth through the months of March and April, with reserves coach Craig McRae noting his "impressive development" and saying he "wouldn't be far off an AFL opportunity" following a two-goal VFL match in early April. Though it would take a further six weeks, that opportunity came in round 10, when Moore was selected for his first AFL match since round 23, 2016. Moore was given little opportunity to ease into that match however, as a concussion sustained early in the match saw teammate Jack Riewoldt play only the opening five minutes of the match and Moore tasked with considerable responsibility as the team's only remaining tall forward. Moore's performance was strong in Riewoldt's absence, taking six marks, kicking three behinds but failing to score a goal. In the Dreamtime at the 'G match against Essendon the following week, he kicked two goals while adding another three behinds, in a performance that AFL Media said outshone the returned Riewoldt. An eight disposal and goalless game in round 12 however, would see Moore's AFL run ended as he was dropped back to VFL level. He was immediately prolific at that level, kicking a bag of five goals during a match against the Northern Blues in late June. That performance and good form over the following two weeks saw Moore earn an AFL recall for a match against Adelaide in round 16. He kicked two goals in that match before going goalless in rounds 17 and 18 and being subsequently dropped back to VFL level ahead of round 19. For the second time that season he responded to an AFL omission by bagging five goals at VFL level. On that occasion it came along with 19 disposals and 12 marks in what development coach Paul Griffiths called Moore's best game for Richmond at either level in his three years at the club. Despite that performance, Moore would not be recalled to senior football and would instead spend the remainder of the year with the club's reserves side in the VFL. There he played a contributing role in each of the team's two finals matches, including kicking two goals in the knock-out semi-final loss to the Essendon reserves. Moore finished the season having played six matches for four goals at AFL level. He also added 26 goals across 14 matches at VFL level that saw him place second at the club behind small forward Tyson Stengle.

Moore signed a one-year contract extension ahead of the 2019 season, being upgraded from the club's rookie list to its senior list. He narrowly missed selection in Richmond's AFL pre-season campaign, instead being named an emergency at the level and ultimately playing with the club's reserves side in the VFL. When teammate Jack Riewoldt missed round 3's match against the Giants with injury, AFL Media named Moore a likely replacement, though he would eventually go unselected. Despite what VFL coach Craig McRae labelled a "great start to the season", Moore would neither be named to play nor as an AFL level emergency through the first four rounds of the season, even in Riewoldt's continued absence from the side. In early May he suffered a severe ankle injury while playing in a VFL match against Williamstown. Surgery was required to repair extensive ligament, tendon and soft tissue damage from the injury, as well as a small fracture. The club placed an expected eight-to-ten week recovery time frame on the injury. By late June he had resumed some running exercises on a weight-assisted treadmill, but was expected to require another six weeks recovery time. Moore made his return to VFL football in early August, immediately impressing with four goals in a win over the Northern Blues. He remained with the minor premiership winning VFL side into their finals series, kicking one goal in a come-from-behind qualifying final win over the Essendon reserves. A fortnight later and despite going into the match suffering the effects of the flu, Moore contributed one goal from a spectacular inside-50 contested mark in a preliminary final as Richmond's reserves won through to the league's grand final. He was goalless in the Richmond VFL side that defeated Williamstown the following week, as the club won its first reserves grade premiership since 1997. Moore finished 2019 having failed to play a match at AFL level, but winning a VFL premiership after nine matches and 12 goals with the club's reserves side.

Moore was delisted by Richmond following the end of the 2019 season, after playing eight AFL matches over four seasons with the club.

=== Carlton (2020) ===
Despite some reported interest from Essendon following his delisting by Richmond, Moore could not secure an AFL contract in the final months of 2019 and instead signed with VFL club Coburg for the 2020 season. However, in the early months of 2020, Moore began training with Carlton and in the second week of March, was signed to the club's AFL list under the pre-season supplemental selection period rules. He played two senior matches for the club during its time in the Perth quarantine hub in the COVID-19 pandemic-affected 2020 season, and was delisted at the end of the year.

== Wangaratta ==
Moore played with the Wangaratta in the Ovens & Murray Football League from 2021 to 2024. Moore played 63 games, in the best 32 time and kicked 223 goals. Moore played in Wangaratta's 2022 O&MFNL grand final win, winning the Did Simpson Medal as best on ground. Moore won the 2021 O&MFNL best and fairest award, the Morris Medal. Moore won the 2023 O&MFNL goalkicking award, the Doug Strang Medal with 81 goals.

== AFL statistics ==
Statistics are correct to the end of the 2020 season

Legend
G	Goals	K	Kicks	D	Disposals	T	Tackles
B	Behinds	H	Handballs	M	Marks

Season	Team	No.	Games	Totals							Averages (per game)						
Season	Team	No.	Games	G	B	K	H	D	M	T	G	B	K	H	D	M	T
2016	Richmond	36	2	1	0	9	3	12	6	6	0.5	0.0	4.5	1.5	6.0	3.0	3.0
2017	Richmond	36	0	—	—	—	—	—	—	—	—	—	—	—	—	—	—
2018	Richmond	36	6	4	9	35	26	61	22	14	0.7	1.5	5.8	4.3	10.2	3.7	2.3
2019	Richmond	36	0	—	—	—	—	—	—	—	—	—	—	—	—	—	—
2020 (Note: The 2020 season was played with 17 home-and-away matches per team (down from 22) and 16-minute quarters with time on (down from 20-minute quarters with time on) due to the impact of the COVID-19 pandemic.)	Carlton	47	2	0	0	2	4	6	2	4	0.0	0.0	1.0	2.0	3.0	1.0	2.0
Career			10	5	9	46	33	79	30	24	0.5	0.9	4.6	3.3	7.9	3.0	2.4

== Honours and achievements ==
AFL (Team)

- McClelland Trophy (Richmond): 2018

VFL

- VFL premiership player: 2019

== Personal life ==
Moore's sister Carle Anahera Myors-Moore played state-league football with Richmond's VFL Women's team in 2018.
