= Connor Menadue =

Australian rules footballer (born 1996)

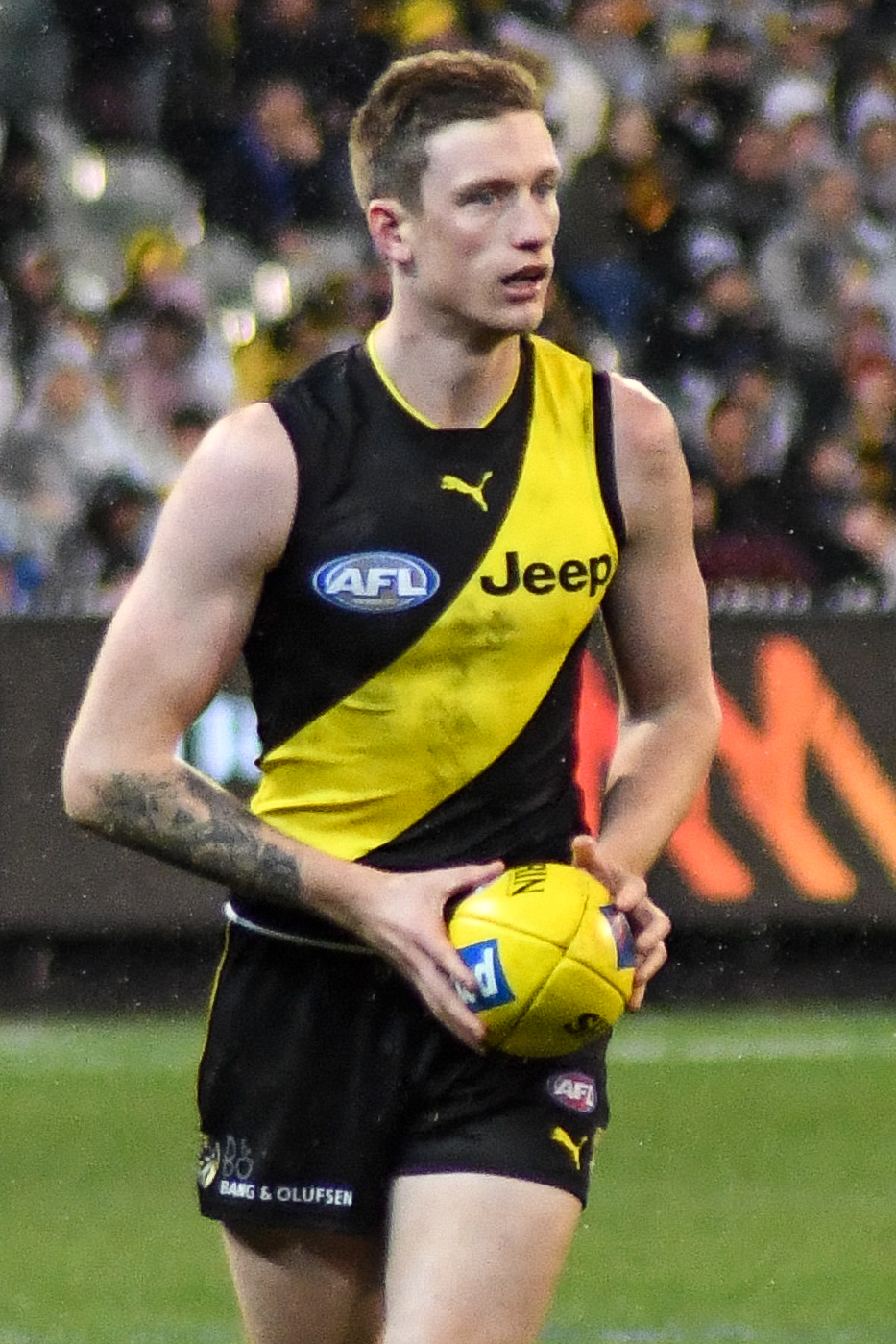
- Menadue playing for Richmond in August 2018

Personal information
- Born: 19 September 1996 (age 30)
- Original teams: Spotswood (WRFL); Western Jets (TAC Cup)
- Draft: No. 33, 2014 AFL National Draft: Richmond
- Debut: Round 7, 2015, Richmond vs. Collingwood, at MCG
- Height: 187 cm (6 ft 2 in)
- Weight: 80 kg (176 lb)
- Position: Wing

Playing career^{1}
Years	Club	Games (Goals)
2015–2019	Richmond	39 (11)
2021	North Melbourne	7 (0)
Total		46 (11)
- ^{1} Playing statistics correct to the end of 2021.

Career highlights
- VFL: VFL premiership player: 2019

Connor Menadue (born 19 September 1996) is a former professional Australian rules footballer for the North Melbourne Football Club in the Australian Football League (AFL), having previously played for 39 AFL matches over a five-year tenure with the Richmond Football Club. He was drafted by Richmond in the second round of the 2014 national draft and made his debut in round 7 the following season. Menadue played in a premiership with Richmond's reserves side in the VFL side in 2019. After being delisted by Richmond at the end of 2019 and after one year out of the league, he was redrafted by North Melbourne in the 2021 rookie draft.

== Early life and junior football ==
Menadue spent his teenage years in Seabrook in Melbourne's south-west. He played junior football with Altona Junior Football Club before crossing over to play with Spotswood in the Western Region Football League in 2012.

In 2013 Menadue played TAC Cup football with the Western Jets. He returned to the club in 2014, playing 16 games and kicking 16 goals for the season. He also held averages of 19.6 disposals and four tackles per game.

Menadue played for the Victorian Metro side at 2014's Under-18 National Championships. He appeared in three matches and recorded an average of five tackles per game.

At the 2014 draft combine he recorded the fifth best time in the 20 metre sprint. He was lauded by draft experts for his elite speed and running ability.

== AFL career ==
=== Richmond (2015–2019) ===
Menadue was drafted by Richmond with their second pick and 33rd selection overall in the 2014 AFL draft. He made his AFL debut in round 7 of the 2015 AFL season in a match against Collingwood at the MCG. Menadue was initially selected as an emergency before being called up to the team on the morning of the match. He was substituted into the game at three-quarter time and recorded one disposal and two tackles in the last quarter of the Tigers' victory. Menadue kicked his first career goal the next week, in a round 8 victory against Port Adelaide. He would play five straight matches before being omitted from Richmond's round 13 side, playing the rest of the season in the club's reserves side in the VFL.

Strong form in the 2016 pre-season competition saw Menadue return to the senior side for round 1, 2016, kicking two goals and recording 13 disposals in the club's victory over Carlton. He went on to play in each of the club's first nine matches. He was subsequently dropped, and played VFL football until being recalled for the club's round 14 match with Brisbane Lions. It was a then-career best match, with Menadue recording his best disposal output to date (19) and a team-high six tackles.

Menadue was again dropped from the senior side in round 18 before returning in round 22 for just one more senior match. He finished the season having played 14 matches and averaging 13.2 disposals.

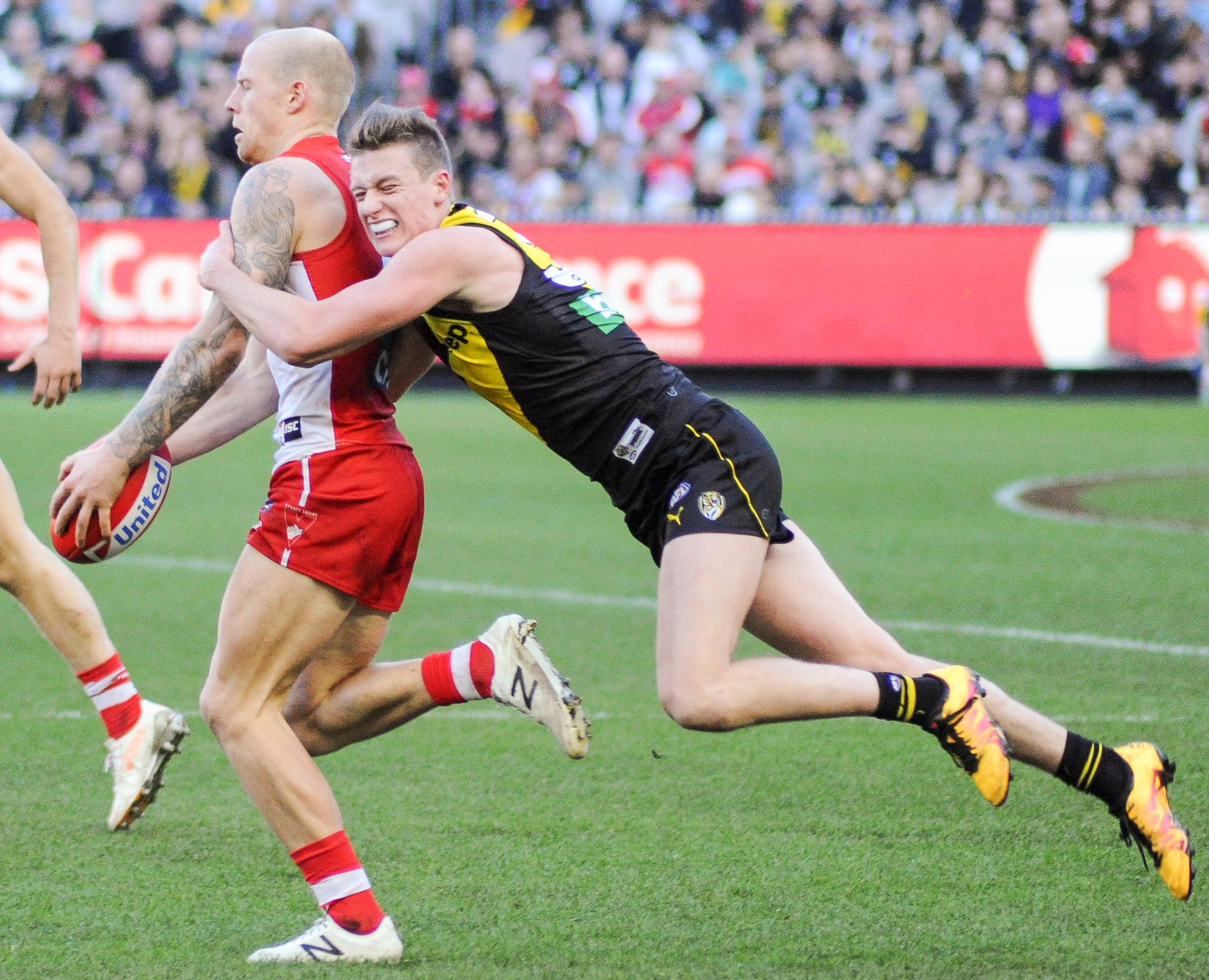
Menadue tackles Sydney's Zak Jones in round 15 of the 2017 season.

Menadue began 2017 playing with Richmond's reserves side in the VFL and made his first senior appearance in round 4's victory over Brisbane. He was dropped from the side following the round 5 win over Melbourne, but would return in round 9 to face the GWS Giants at Spotless Stadium in Sydney. He kicked two goals in the tight loss and would remain in the side for the following two weeks. Through Richmond's bye at the mid-way point of the season he had played five matches, kicked two goals and recorded an average of 11.4 disposals per game. Returning from the bye in round 13 against Sydney, Menadue was involved in an incident where Swans forward Lance Franklin hit him with a bump during play. Menadue spoke down the impacts of the hit and Franklin ultimately avoided suspension. After round 15 Menadue placed second in the league for peak on-field sprint speeds recorded during the season (35.0 kilometres per hour). He played his final senior match for the season in round 16, being dropped the week following for his part in the club's 67-point loss to St Kilda. He played the remainder of the season with the club's reserves side in the VFL. There he joined the team through its three finals wins and in its losing grand final against Port Melbourne. Although he would not play in the match like his premiership winning club mates, Menadue was still involved in Grand Final day, winning the Grand Final sprint and upsetting pre-race favourite Jayden Hunt.

Leading into 2018 Menadue underwent a role change, shifting from the wing to the half-back position. He had a largely uninterrupted pre-season training campaign but some soreness and minor injuries in late February and early March meant he was unable to partake in the AFL pre-season competition. He was worked back into fitness during VFL pre-season matches in late March however, including one against the Box Hill where he recorded an equal team-high 25 disposals. Menadue remained with the reserves team into the start of their season proper and after some strong form was named the carryover emergency for the club's AFL match-up with Hawthorn in round 3.

Although he would not earn senior selection immediately he did continue an impressive run of form at the lower level, noted by backline coach Ryan Ferguson for his ability to break lines off of half-back. In late May he played in his first AFL match of the year, a round 10 victory over St Kilda. Menadue remained in the senior side for a further two matches, including in round 11 where he kicked his first goal of the year. He was dropped back to reserves level however, after an eight disposal match against Port Adelaide in round 12. There he was immediately trialed in a new role as an inside midfielder which saw him gather seven clearances and 16 contested possessions in a VFL win over the Northern Blues. Menadue was illustrious across multiple roles at VFL level in the month that followed, used as a half-back, wing and inside midfielder before earning an AFL recall in round 18. An unnamed injury saw Menadue miss in round 19 before making an immediate return in round 20. It would prove to be a one-match run though as Menadue was again dropped to VFL level despite gathering a season-best 18 disposals in the win over Geelong. He remained at the lower level for the remainder of the season, unable to gain senior selection despite being named as an emergency on multiple occasions.

Menadue was a meaningful contributor in the club's two VFL finals losses including recording 26 disposals and two goals in the knock-out semi-final loss to Essendon. That effort would see him in the selection frame, though ultimately unselected for the club's final AFL match of the year, a preliminary final loss to Collingwood. Menadue finished the year having played five AFL matches as well as 14 with the club's reserves side in the VFL.

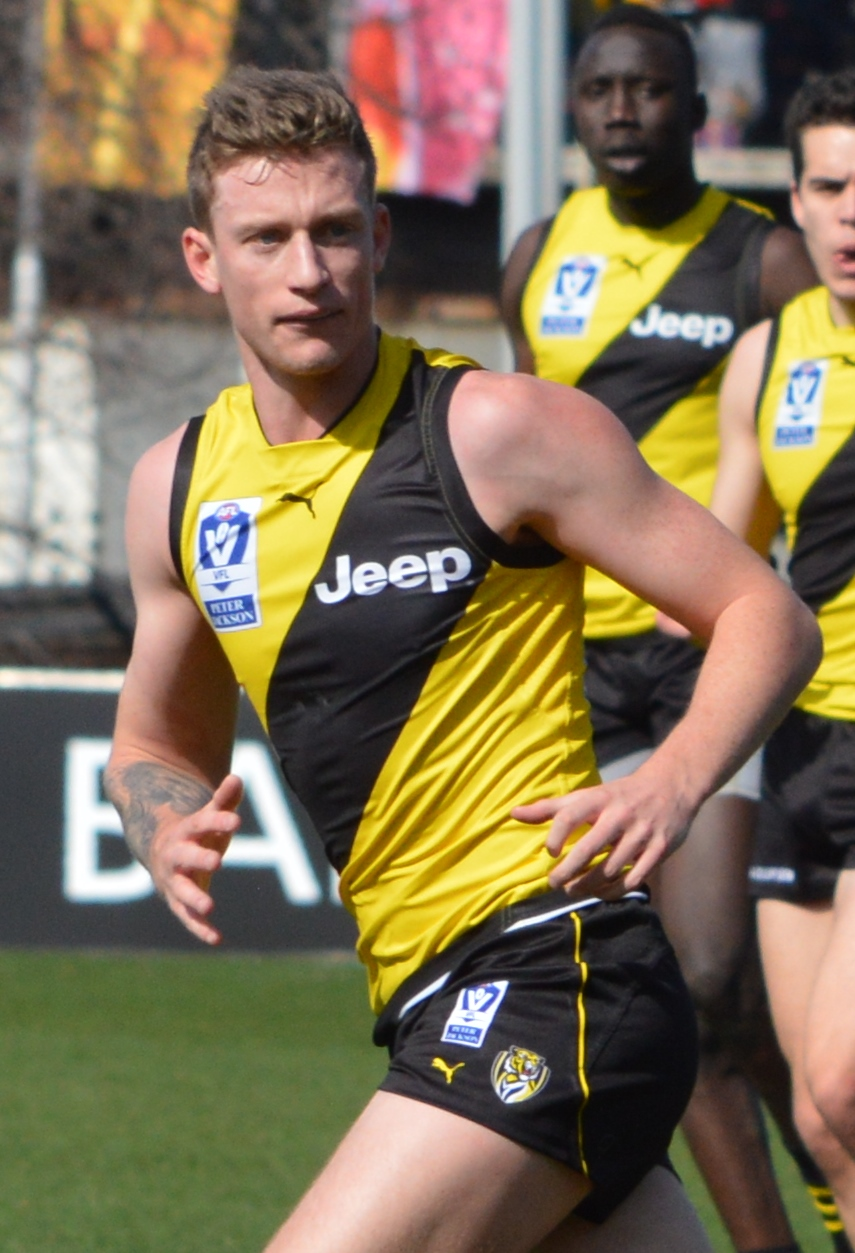
Menadue playing VFL football with Richmond in August 2017

After signing a one-year contract for the 2019 season, Menadue completed a largely uninterrupted pre-season training program in the 2018/19 summer. During that period he was labeled by AFL Media and Fox Footy as a candidate for regular senior football at Richmond that year, following the off-season departure of fringe players Anthony Miles, Corey Ellis and Sam Lloyd and well as regularly selected winger Reece Conca. Despite those plaudits, Menadue could not earn selection in the club's first official pre-season matches in March and was instead only named as an emergency. Though he would earn selection to play half a match in the second and final match of that series, his nine disposal performance was not enough to earn AFL selection in round 1. He was instead named an AFL emergency and started his season with VFL matches in late March and early April. In round 4, Menadue was initially named as an AFL emergency before a late injury to veteran Bachar Houli saw Menadue selected for his first match of the season. Houli was ruled fit to play after just one match on the sidelines however, and Menadue was immediately returned to VFL football in round 5. After two weeks at the lower level, Menadue earned a second shot at AFL football that year in Richmond's round 7 loss to the Western Bulldogs. He recorded 15 disposals in that match before turning in a career-best 23 disposals in the club's round 8 win over Fremantle in Perth. Menadue remained at AFL level for another two matches including a stint in the forward line in round 10, before being dropped back to VFL level in round 11. It was not to be his last AFL match that year however, when he was recalled to senior level in round 13 following two strong matches at half-back in the VFL. Menadue could manage just 11 disposals however, and was immediately dropped back to reserves level.

Despite largely being passed over for selection, Menadue was named an AFL emergency on a club-most eight occasions to round 13, meaning he had been in the emergencies or final lineup for every Richmond AFL side to that point in 2019. He continued to be regularly named as an AFL emergency in the back half of the season, while playing a variety of roles at VFL level including in the midfield and as a forward. Menadue was prolific at VFL level in the lead in to the finals, named best on ground twice in the final six weeks and kicking two goals in each of three separate matches as the side secured a second-straight minor premiership. He kicked a further two goals in Richmond's come-from-behind VFL qualifying final victory over the Essendon reserves in the first week of the finals series. Menadue was best-on-ground in the preliminary final that followed, kicking three goals and recording 27 disposals as Richmond won through to a VFL grand final. Despite his form, Menadue continued to miss out on selection during the club's AFL finals run and instead stayed with the VFL team as they defeated Williamstown in the grand final to win the club's first reserves-grade premiership since 1997. Menadue finished 2019 having played six matches at AFL level along with 15 games for 14 goals in the reserves, including in that year's VFL premiership.

In the weeks following the end of the 2019 season, media reports began emerging with claims Fremantle were interest in trading for the out of contract Menadue given the impending loss of wingers Bradley Hill and Ed Langdon. Richmond list boss Neil Balme expressed public support for Menadue to explore greater AFL-level playing opportunities, before Balme's Fremantle counterpart Peter Bell confirmed on the opening day of the trade period that the club had some initial interest in acquiring Menadue. No trade was completed however, after Fremantle instead chose to prioritise trades for Collingwood's James Aish and St Kilda's Blake Acres. Menadue was delisted by Richmond following the end of the trade period and after 39 AFL matches over five seasons at the club.

=== North Melbourne (2021) ===
Following his delisting at Richmond, Menadue signed on to play VFL football with Werribee for the 2020 VFL Season. With that competition cancelled due to the impacts of the COVID-19 pandemic, Menadue effectively sat out from football during the entire 2020 season.

In the 2021 rookie draft held in December 2020, Menadue was drafted by North Melbourne with the club's second pick and the 18th selection overall.

After seven games for North Melbourne, Menadue was delisted at the conclusion of the 2021 AFL season.

== Statistics ==
Statistics are correct to the end of the 2020 season

Legend
G	Goals	K	Kicks	D	Disposals	T	Tackles
B	Behinds	H	Handballs	M	Marks

Season	Team	No.	Games	Totals							Averages (per game)						
Season	Team	No.	Games	G	B	K	H	D	M	T	G	B	K	H	D	M	T
2015	Richmond	37	5	1	2	16	13	29	7	10	0.2	0.4	3.2	2.6	5.8	1.4	2.0
2016	Richmond	37	14	6	3	80	105	185	50	43	0.4	0.2	5.7	7.5	13.2	3.6	3.1
2017	Richmond	37	9	3	1	59	59	118	29	24	0.3	0.1	6.6	6.6	13.1	3.2	2.7
2018	Richmond	37	5	1	3	39	21	60	17	9	0.2	0.6	7.8	4.2	12.0	3.4	1.8
2019	Richmond	37	6	0	0	62	23	85	19	13	0.0	0.0	10.3	3.8	14.2	3.2	2.2
2020	—	—	0	—	—	—	—	—	—	—	—	—	—	—	—	—	—
Career			39	11	9	256	221	477	122	99	0.3	0.2	6.6	5.7	12.2	3.1	2.5

== Honours and achievements ==
2017 Grand Final Sprint Winner

Team

- McClelland Trophy (Richmond): 2018

VFL

- VFL premiership player: 2019
