= John Vickery (footballer) =

Australian rules footballer

Personal information
- Full name: John Vickery
- Born: 6 July 1951 (age 75)
- Original team: Coleraine
- Height: 184 cm (6 ft 0 in)
- Weight: 78 kg (172 lb)

Playing career^{1}
Years	Club	Games (Goals)
1971–72	Collingwood	4 (0)
- ^{1} Playing statistics correct to the end of 1972.

John Vickery (born 6 July 1951) is a former Australian rules footballer who played with Collingwood in the Victorian Football League (VFL). He is the father of former Richmond and Hawthorn footballer Ty Vickery.
