= Todd Elton =

Australian rules footballer (born 1993)

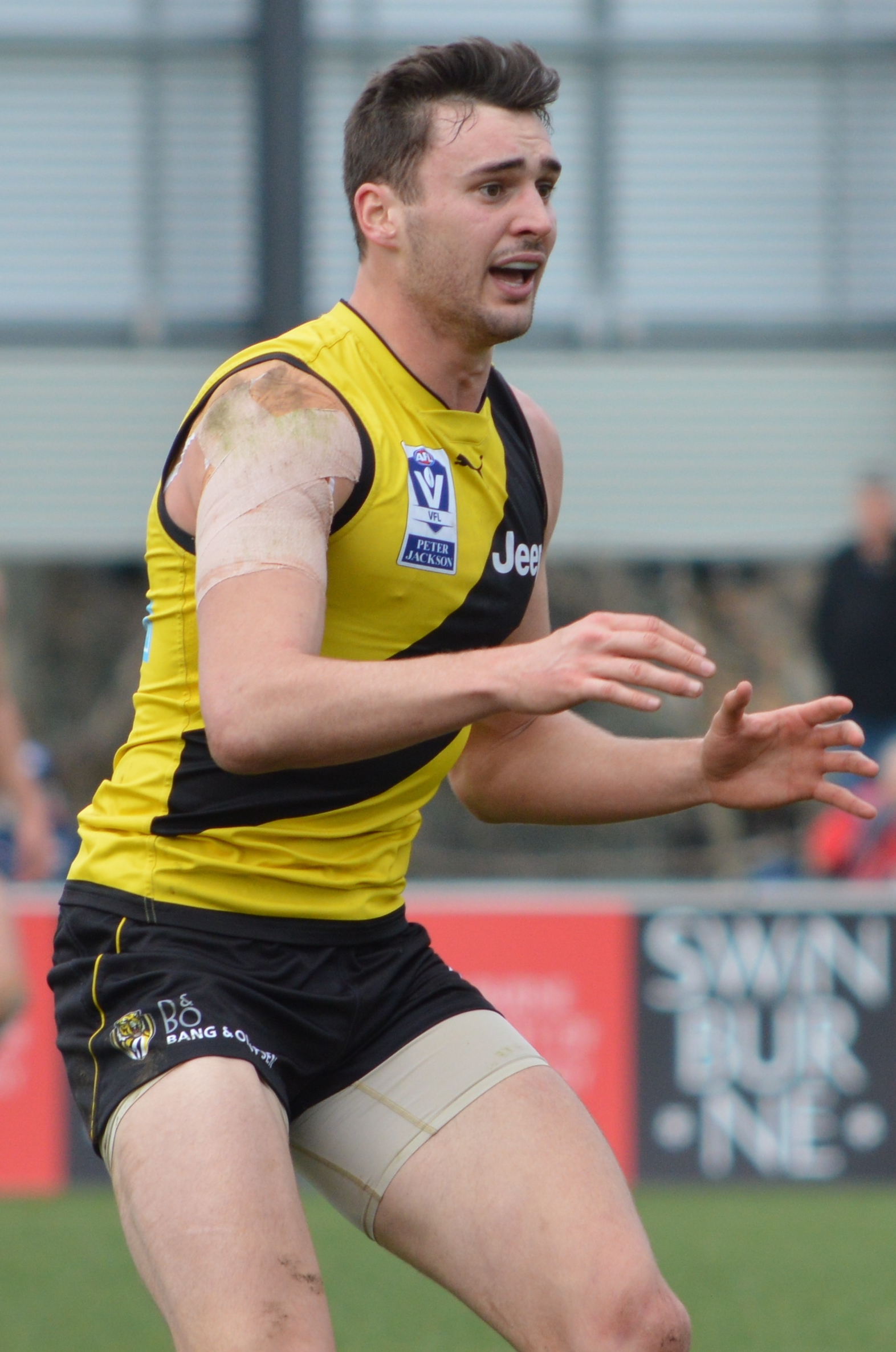
- Elton in July 2017

Personal information
- Born: 29 April 1993 (age 33)
- Original teams: Dandenong Stingrays (TAC Cup); Somerville (MPNFL)
- Draft: No. 26, 2011 national draft
- Debut: Round 14, 2012, Richmond vs. Adelaide, at AAMI Stadium
- Height: 197 cm (6 ft 6 in)
- Weight: 92 kg (203 lb)
- Position: Forward

Playing career^{1}
Years	Club	Games (Goals)
2012–2017	Richmond	10 (2)
- ^{1} Playing statistics correct to the end of 2017.

Todd Elton (born 29 April 1993) is a former professional Australian rules footballer who played for the Richmond Football Club in the Australian Football League (AFL).

== Junior football ==
Elton played junior football for three clubs; Tyabb, Somerville and the Frankston Dolphins. He played TAC Cup football for the Dandenong Stingrays in 2011 and represented both Victoria Metro and Victoria Country at national championships in his youth.

In 2011 Elton was one of 30 players from around the country selected to be a part of the 2011 AIS/AFL academy program. As part of the program, Elton spent time training with the Carlton Football Club in 2011.

Elton attended high school at Frankston High School.

== AFL career ==
Elton was drafted by Richmond with the club's second pick and 26th selection overall in the 2011 AFL draft.

Elton made his debut in round 14 of the 2012 season, in a match against Adelaide at AAMI Stadium in Adelaide. He recorded just four disposals on debut. He did not play again for the senior side in 2012; instead returning to play for the club's then-VFL affiliate Coburg.

In 2013 Elton failed to play for the club's senior side, instead playing reserves football for Coburg.

Again in 2014 he could not manage a senior match. He played reserves football for the newly created Richmond stand-alone VFL side.

2015 saw Elton return to the club's AFL side, appearing in one match for the year. Playing in defence, he recorded just five disposals in the team's victory against Collingwood in round 7.

Elton next appeared for the club's AFL side in round 22 2016. He would kick his first career goal in the match against St Kilda. For the first time in his career, Elton played two straight matches when he was returned to the side for the round 23 match against Sydney.

By the beginning of 2017 Elton had transitioned permanently to the role of key position forward. He came into the club's AFL side in round 3, replacing the injured Ben Griffiths. He recorded nine disposals, three marks and four tackles in the win against West Coast. Following a run of three straight matches at senior level (his first such in his career), Elton was omitted from Richmond's round 6 side to take on Adelaide. He returned to the side the following week but was again dropped following a six disposal match in round 8. Elton returned in round 10's Dreamtime at the 'G match where he kicked his first goal of the season, before being dropped for a third time ahead of round 11. Elton suffered a dislocated shoulder while playing with Richmond's reserves in the VFL in early June. The injury did not require surgery to correct but would still hold him out from playing until mid-July. He would fail to return to senior football that season, playing out the home and away season in the VFL. Despite being available for selection, he missed out on playing in the reserves' finals wins or in their losing grand final, instead being left out for team balance.

Elton was delisted by Richmond at the conclusion of the 2017 season, having played 10 AFL matches over his six-year tenure at the club.

== Post AFL career ==
Elton played for Frankston Football Club in the Victorian Football League (VFL) in 2018 before moving to play for Hastings Football Club in the Mornington Peninsula Nepean Football League in 2019.

In October 2019, Elton was introduced as a contestant on season 2 of the reality television show Love Island Australia.

== Statistics ==
Legend
G	Goals	K	Kicks	D	Disposals	T	Tackles
B	Behinds	H	Handballs	M	Marks

Season	Team	No.	Games	Totals							Averages (per game)						
Season	Team	No.	Games	G	B	K	H	D	M	T	G	B	K	H	D	M	T
2012	Richmond	43	1	0	1	3	1	4	2	4	0.0	1.0	3.0	1.0	4.0	2.0	4.0
2013	Richmond	43	0	—	—	—	—	—	—	—	—	—	—	—	—	—	—
2014	Richmond	43	0	—	—	—	—	—	—	—	—	—	—	—	—	—	—
2015	Richmond	43	1	0	0	2	3	5	2	1	0.0	0.0	2.0	3.0	5.0	2.0	1.0
2016	Richmond	43	2	1	1	9	12	21	9	1	0.5	0.5	4.5	6.0	10.5	4.5	0.5
2017	Richmond	43	6	1	5	26	24	50	18	10	0.2	0.8	4.3	4.0	8.3	3.0	1.7
Career			10	2	7	40	40	80	31	16	0.2	0.7	4.0	4.0	8.0	3.1	1.6
