= Ty Vickery =

Australian rules footballer (born 1990)

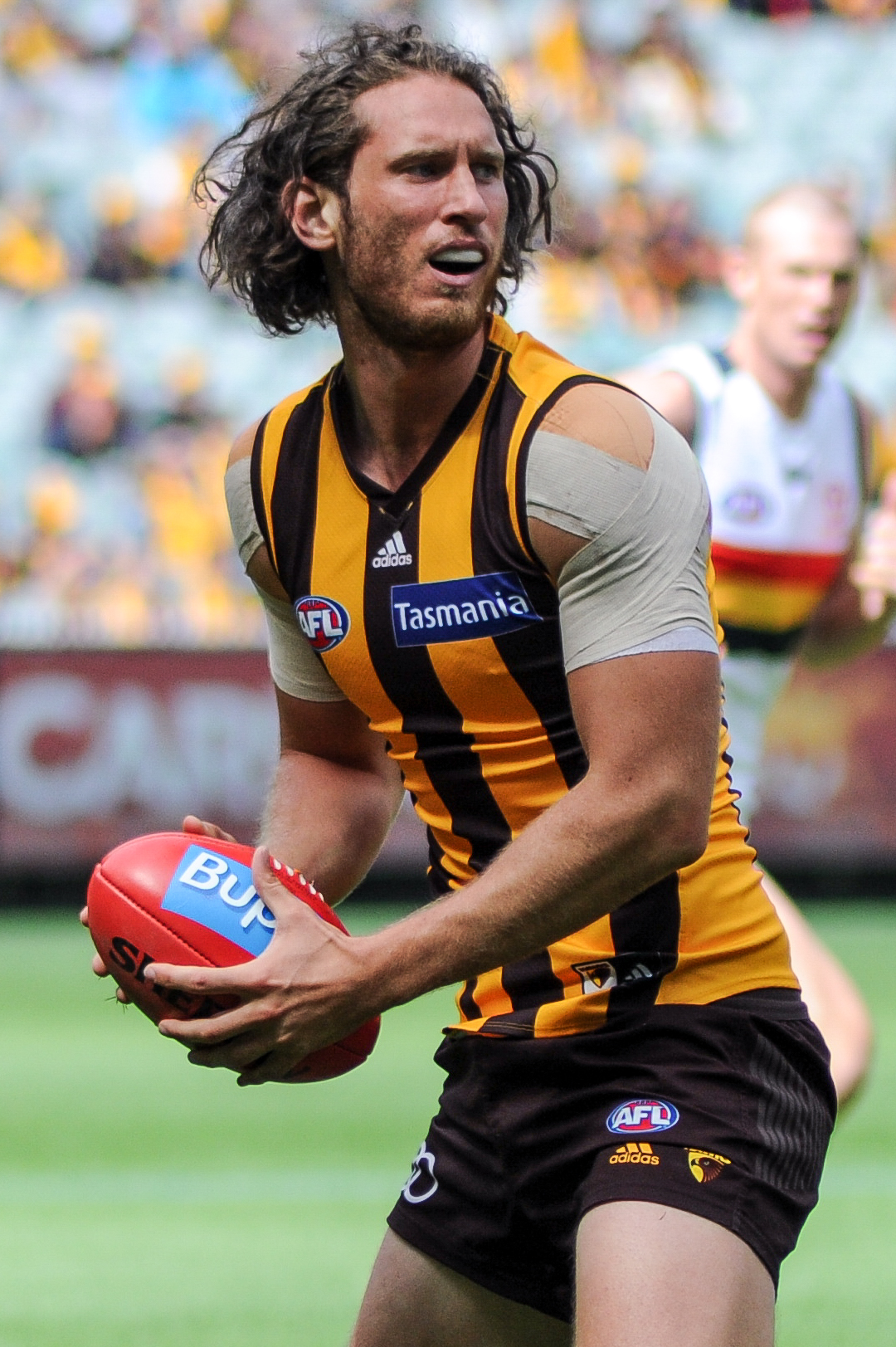
- Vickery in April 2017

Personal information
- Full name: Tyrone Vickery
- Born: 31 May 1990 (age 36); Melbourne
- Original teams: Haileybury; Sandringham Dragons (TAC Cup)
- Draft: No. 8, 2008 national draft
- Debut: Round 12, 2009, Richmond vs. West Coast, at Etihad Stadium
- Height: 200 cm (6 ft 7 in)
- Weight: 100 kg (220 lb)
- Position: Forward / ruck

Playing career^{1}
Years	Club	Games (Goals)
2009–2016	Richmond	119 (158)
2017	Hawthorn	6 (2)
Total		125 (160)
- ^{1} Playing statistics correct to the end of 2017.

Career highlights
- Ian Stewart Medal: 2013; Box Hill leading goalkicker: 2017

Tyrone John Vickery (born 31 May 1990) is a former Australian rules footballer who played for the Richmond Football Club and Hawthorn Football Club in the Australian Football League (AFL). He is the son of former Collingwood player John Vickery.

== Junior career ==
As a junior, Vickery played for the Sandringham Dragons in the TAC Cup. At age 17 and when completing his second last year at Haileybury College, he suffered a ruptured anterior cruciate ligament when his right knee collapsed under a tackle. He faced ten months away from football but returned to represent the Victorian Metro side in the Under-18 National Championships where he won All-Australian selection.

== AFL career ==
=== Richmond (2009–2016) ===
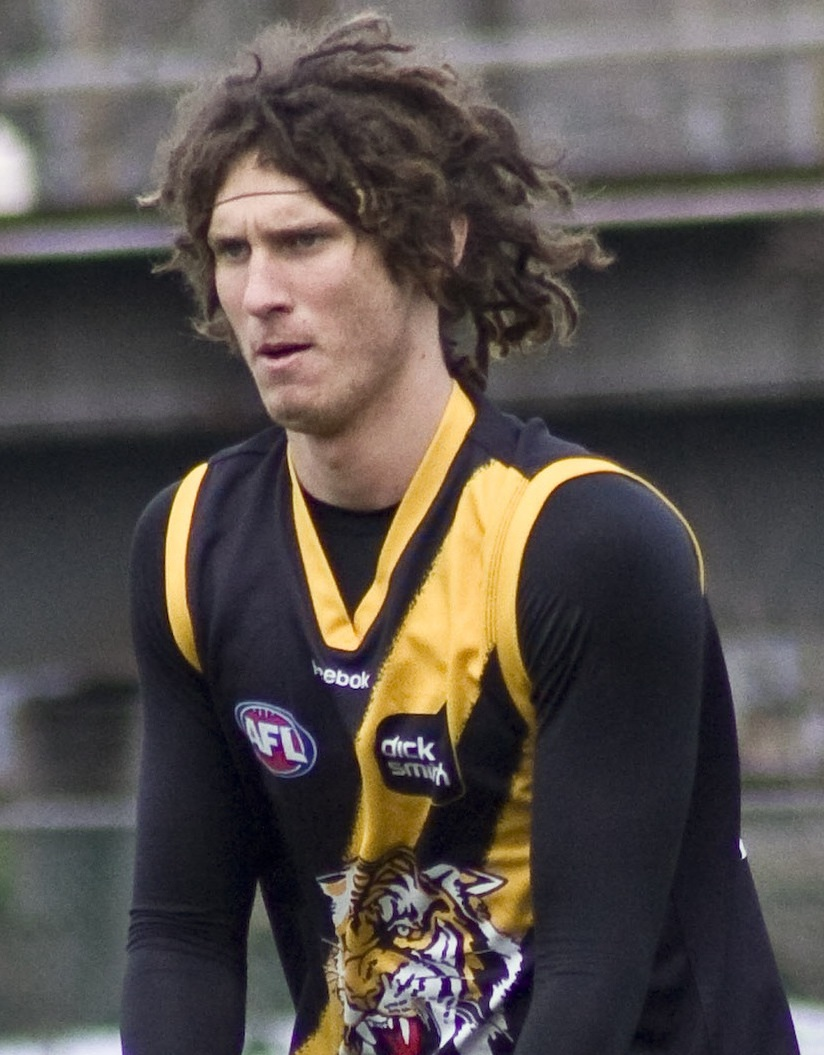
Vickery with Richmond in 2009

Vickery was drafted by the Richmond Football Club with the eighth overall pick in the 2008 National Draft and made his AFL debut in round 12 of the 2009 AFL season. He went on to play 23 games across his first two seasons, kicking eight goals.

In 2011, Vickery was shifted to a full-time forward role. He played every game for the season and kicked 35 goals, placing second in the club's goal kicking tally. He also received the Kevin Bartlett medal for a fifth-placed finish in the club's best and fairest award.

An injury received in pre-season cruelled his 2012 campaign, limiting him to only nine games.

In 2013 however, he played 21 games and kicked 27 goals, again placing second in club's goal kicking. In the Tigers' round 14 matchup against St Kilda, his 18 disposal, 11 mark and one goal performance won him best-afield honours and the Ian Stewart Medal. Vickery also played in Richmond's first final in 12 years and booted two goals on the day.

He played just 12 games in 2014 as competition came from fellow Tiger, Ben Griffiths for the second key-forward role in Richmond's game structure. In round 18 2014, Vickery struck and concussed West Coast ruckman Dean Cox in a boundary-side ruck contest. He was suspended for four weeks by the AFL Tribunal and offered a public apology for the incident.

In 2015, Vickery found himself again in favour with coach, Damien Hardwick who began frequently playing him alongside both Ben Griffiths and former Coleman Medallist, Jack Riewoldt. He kicked a career high six goals in the Tigers' 91-point victory over Collingwood in round 21. Vickery finished the season with 31 goals across 15 games, second at the club behind Riewoldt.

Despite a relatively strong start to season 2016, Vickery would play just six of the club's final 11 games. Over the period he struggled to impact the game outside of his goal-scoring work, averaging only eight disposals per game. His final game, a two-goal performance, came in round 21 against Geelong. After 119 matches and 158 goals with Richmond, he announced he would be exploring his options as a restricted free agent.

=== Hawthorn (2017) ===
In October 2016, Vickery joined Hawthorn as a restricted free agent after Richmond announced they would not match the contract offer. Richmond received pick 29 in the 2016 draft as compensation, and drafted Shai Bolton who was playing for Sth Fremantle in the WAFL. In November 2017, Vickery announced his retirement from the AFL due to losing passion for the game.

== Statistics ==
Legend
G	Goals	K	Kicks	D	Disposals	T	Tackles
B	Behinds	H	Handballs	M	Marks	H/O	Hit-outs

Season	Team	No.	Games	Totals								Averages (per game)								Votes
Season	Team	No.	Games	G	B	K	H	D	M	T	H/O	G	B	K	H	D	M	T	H/O	Votes
2009	Richmond	29	9	5	1	22	56	78	22	17	79	0.6	0.1	2.4	6.2	8.7	2.4	1.9	8.8	0
2010	Richmond	29	14	3	3	37	76	113	25	30	122	0.2	0.2	2.6	5.4	8.1	1.8	2.1	8.7	0
2011	Richmond	29	22	36	19	135	117	252	95	39	156	1.6	0.9	6.1	5.3	11.5	4.3	1.8	7.1	2
2012	Richmond	29	9	7	5	41	32	73	21	21	59	0.8	0.6	4.6	3.6	8.1	2.3	2.3	6.6	0
2013	Richmond	29	21	27	19	157	105	262	116	33	167	1.3	0.9	7.5	5.0	12.5	5.5	1.6	8.0	1
2014	Richmond	29	12	23	10	80	47	127	46	27	81	1.9	0.8	6.7	3.9	10.6	3.8	2.3	6.8	1
2015	Richmond	29	15	31	9	108	50	158	73	23	85	2.1	0.6	7.2	3.3	10.5	4.9	1.5	5.7	4
2016	Richmond	29	17	26	15	90	51	141	68	34	37	1.5	0.9	5.3	3.0	8.3	4.0	2.0	2.2	0
2017	Hawthorn	27	6	2	6	29	32	61	14	17	58	0.3	1.0	4.8	5.3	10.2	2.3	2.8	9.7	0
Career			125	160	87	699	566	1265	480	241	844	1.3	0.7	5.6	4.5	10.1	3.8	1.9	6.8	8

== Honours and achievements ==
Individual

- Ian Stewart Medal: 2013
- Box Hill leading goalkicker: 2017
- Under 18 All-Australian team: 2008

== Personal life ==
Vickery married Russian-born and naturalised-Australian professional tennis player Arina Rodionova in December 2015. They announced their divorce in 2025 on Instagram.
