= Anthony Miles (Australian footballer) =

Australian rules footballer (born 1992)

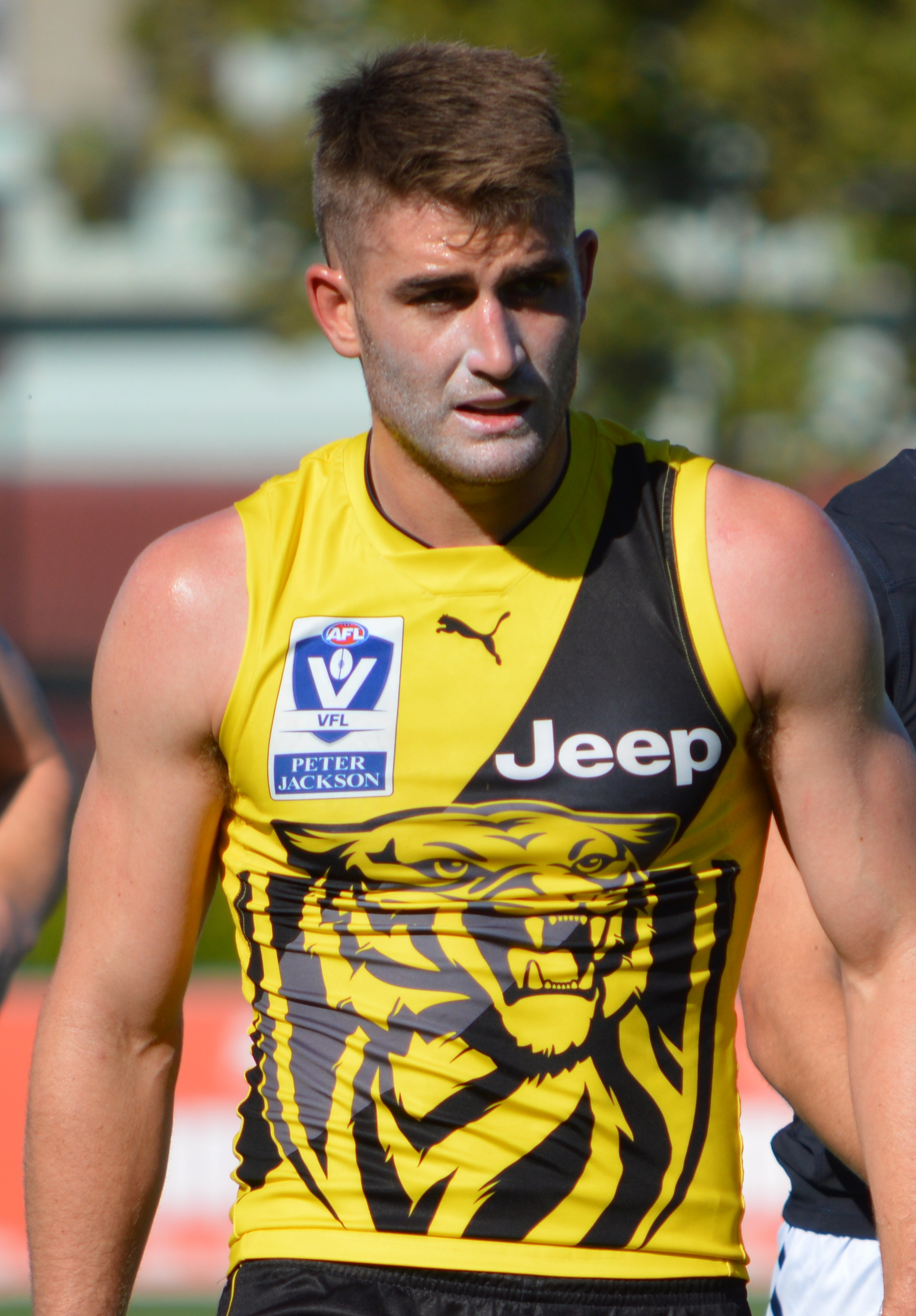
- Miles with Richmond's VFL side in March 2018

Personal information
- Nicknames: Snipper, Snip, Grub
- Born: 28 February 1992 (age 34); Albury, New South Wales
- Original teams: Howlong (Hume Football League); Murray Bushrangers (TAC Cup); NSW/ACT Rams (TAC Cup)
- Height: 180 cm (5 ft 11 in)
- Weight: 80 kg (176 lb)
- Position: Midfielder

Club information
- Current club: Gold Coast
- Number: 2

Playing career
Years	Club	Games (Goals)
2012–2013	Greater Western Sydney	10 (1)
2014–2018	Richmond	61 (24)
2019–2020	Gold Coast	17 (6)
Total		88 (31)

Career highlights
- AFL: Fred Swift Medal (4th RFC B&F): 2015; Cosgrove–Jenkins Award (RFC best first-year player): 2014; VFL: J.J. Liston Trophy: 2018; 2× Guinane Medal (RFC reserves B&F): 2017, 2018

Anthony Miles (born 28 February 1992) is a former Australian rules footballer who played 88 matches over nine seasons at the Greater Western Sydney Giants, the Richmond Football Club and the Gold Coast Football Club in the Australian Football League (AFL). While playing with Richmond's reserves side in 2018 he won the J.J. Liston Trophy as the Victorian Football League's best and fairest player.

== Early life and junior football ==
Miles was born to parents Mary and Gerald in February 1992. He grew up in the rural New South Wales town of Howlong, 30 kilometres north-west of Albury. Miles attended school at Albury High School in the New South Wales/Victoria border town. He played club football with Howlong in the Hume Football League.

In 2009 and 2010 Miles played TAC Cup football for the Murray Bushrangers, appearing in 13 and 11 matches respectively. He finished both seasons in second place in the club's best and fairest award. In 2010 he was also the club's club's vice-captain. In addition, he played matches for the NSW/ACT Rams in the same competition in 2010 and served as the team's captain during this time. He was selected in the TAC Cup team of the year in 2010.

Miles played representative state football for NSW/ACT at under-16 and under-18 levels, captaining both teams. He was selected as an under-18 All-Australian following a stellar national carnival in 2010.

== AFL career ==
=== Greater Western Sydney (2012–2013) ===
Miles was originally recruited to the newly formed GWS Giants through zoning concessions. He signed his first contract with the club while still in high school in June 2010, opting out of a potential nomination for the AFL draft in the process.

Miles would go on to train and play for the club in matches prior to its introduction to the AFL in 2012.

He played his first AFL game in round 4, 2012 in a loss to Adelaide at AAMI Stadium. He recorded 15 disposals, eight marks and six tackles in the match. He recorded an impressive 27 disposals in his next match, in round 17 against Fremantle. He managed seven appearances in an injury-riddled debut season, recording averages of 18 disposals and five marks.

Miles would manage just three AFL appearances in 2013, with averages of 13 disposals four tackles and four marks. He did however kick his first career goal in a round 9 loss to Hawthorn at York Park.

At the conclusion of the 2013 season the Giants decided not to offer Miles a new contract. Efforts to move him during the trade period all failed and he was later de-listed by the club. He had played ten games across two seasons.

=== Richmond (2014–2018) ===
Miles was subsequently drafted by the Richmond Football Club with the club's second pick and 27th pick overall in the 2014 Rookie Draft.

In May 2014, Miles was upgraded to Richmond's senior list and played his first senior game for Richmond in round 12, 2014. He recorded 18 disposals and eight clearances for the match Miles impressed early, with Tigers coach Damien Hardwick pleasantly surprised by Miles' substantial contributions to the team. Over his first six matches Miles lead all Richmond players for contested possessions and placed third in the league for clearances. He didn't miss another game that season, including appearing in the club's losing elimination final to Port Adelaide. He finished the season placed fifth at the club for average disposals (24.4) and second in total clearances despite playing in just 13 matches. His per game clearance rate (6.6) was the sixth best across all league players that season. Miles received the Cosgrove–Jenkins Award as Richmond's best first year players.

Miles entered the 2015 season firmly in the club's best 22. This would remain the case throughout the year, with Miles playing his first full season of matches, including a second straight finals series. He twice matched his then career-high 30 disposals in rounds 6 and 18 matches against North Melbourne and Hawthorn. Miles was one of the club's best in its elimination final defeat at the hands of North Melbourne. He recorded a team high 22 disposals and team high 9 clearances on the day. At the end of the season Miles led the club for clearances (135) and placed third for total disposals (544). He also recorded the second-most free kicks drawn of any player in the league that season. His nine votes received in the year's Brownlow Medal was both a career high and good for third place at the club. In October Miles was awarded the Fred Swift medal for his fourth placed finish in the club's best and fairest count.

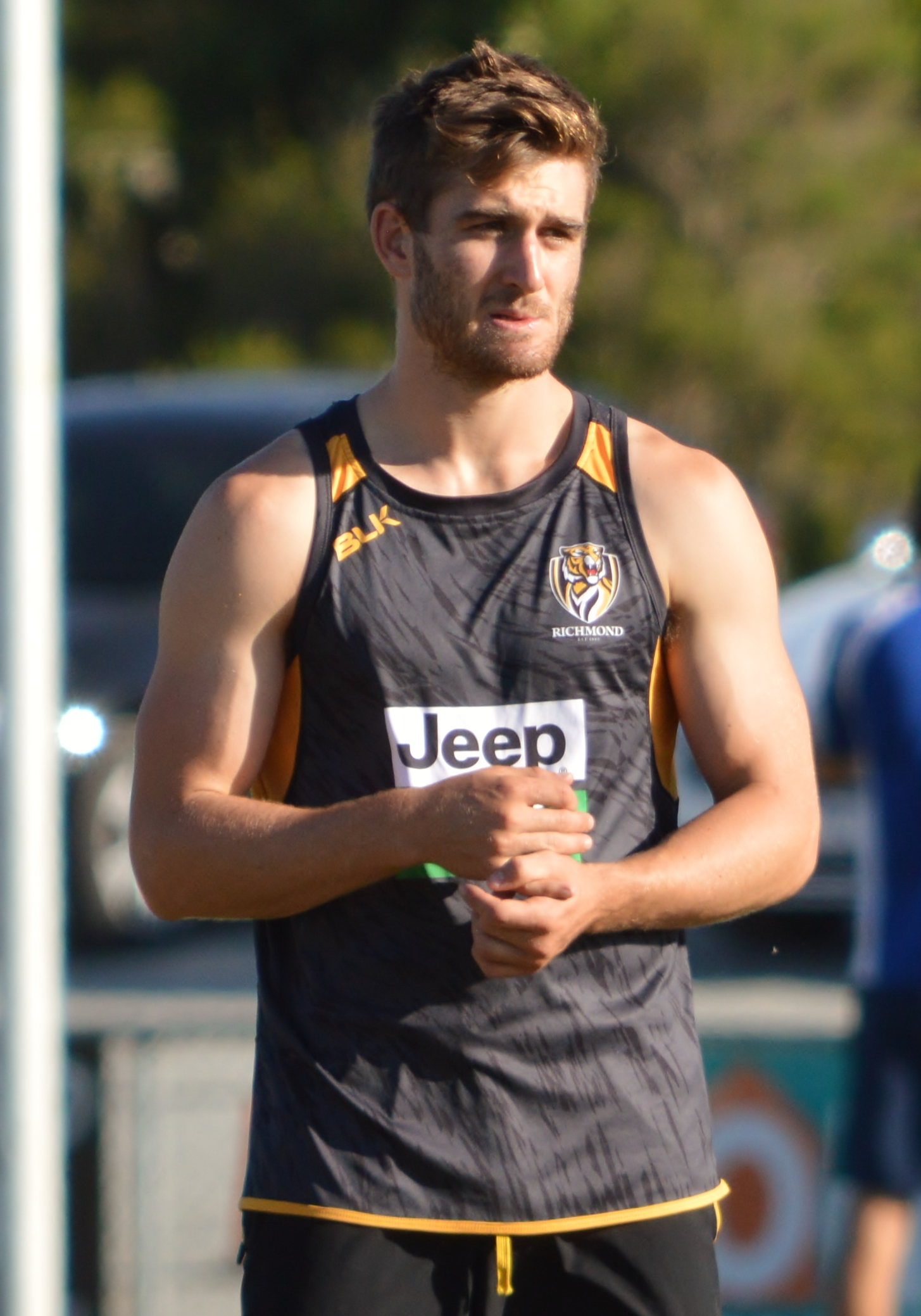
Miles at Richmond's family day in December 2016

Prior to 2016, Miles expressed a need to improve his fitness base. With the reduction in the interchange cap from 120 to 90 per team per game, Miles recognised the need to stay on the field for longer stretches than ever before. His early output in 2016 reflected the struggles that came with this change. He missed his first game since his Richmond debut when he was dropped ahead of the team's round 4 clash with West Coast. He returned to the team after missing just one match though, recording 25 disposals and a goal in round 6's ANZAC Day eve match against Melbourne. Though he recorded a career best 31 disposals in round 8, Miles found consistency hard to come by in 2016. In round 19 he recorded his lowest disposal match since joining Richmond, picking up just 11 during his side's huge loss to his old club Greater Western Sydney. He was dropped again prior to round 22, and did not return to the senior side for the final match of the season. Miles placed sixth in the club's best and fairest count in 2016. He dropped to eighth at the club for average disposals (22.7) and third (92) for total clearances in 2016.

As with the previous season, Miles' 2017 pre-season saw him training to improve his aerobic fitness in addition to adding versatility to his game. But with the off-season addition of Josh Caddy and Dion Prestia, Miles was squeezed out of the Richmond midfield brigade, forced to sit out the season opening match for the first time in three years. He remained in the club's reserves side for the following six weeks. Richmond VFL coach Craig McRae referred to Miles as "an AFL player waiting for an opportunity" after he recorded 35 disposals and two goals in one such match. He made his return to AFL football in round 7, called to the senior side to play the reigning premier Western Bulldogs. His stay was short-lived however, being dropped again in round 8. Miles returned once more for a single game in round 9, this time recording 15 disposals, one tackle and two marks in the loss to his former team the GWS Giants. After being dropped for round 10, another two months of VFL football awaited, where he was a consistent performer including a three week run of 35, 34 and 32 disposals. In round 17 he once more returned to senior football, recording 24 disposals, eight marks and four tackles in Richmond's win over the Brisbane Lions. He could not hold his place however, dropped for round 18 before being recalled in round 19. Miles turned in eight tackles that match and earned a second-straight game for the first time that season. Despite this, round 20 would be his last senior match of the year, dropped for a fourth and final time in 2017. He played out the season at reserves level including in the club's three finals victories, and in their losing grand final against Port Melbourne. Miles finished the 2017 season having played six matches and kicked one goal at senior level. He also played 14 matches in the reserves and kicked nine goals. He received the Guinane Medal as the best and fairest player in the club's VFL side and placed fifth in that league's best and fairest count. When Miles came out of contract at the end of 2017 he was offered a one-year contract extension at Richmond. He deferred a decision on this offer, instead sounding out interest at other clubs in search of more AFL level opportunity. Later reports would suggest Gold Coast were the only club to put an offer forward, a one-year rookie deal. Meanwhile Essendon were reportedly concerned his foot speed was not up to standard for an AFL-level midfielder and would not seek to sign him. He ultimately opted to accept a deal to stay on at Richmond, signing a contract that would keep him at the club until the end of the 2018 season.

Miles underwent minor shoulder surgery in the 2017/18 off-season, allowing him to focus on building aerobic fitness and reducing his weight before returning to contact drills in February. The early part of the 2018 season, however, followed much the same story as the previous year, with Miles playing consistently "above VFL level" in Richmond's reserves side. While Miles' starring role at that level became a weekly occurrence, senior coach Damien Hardwick described having to confront Miles each week to tell him he would not be selected; that he was "not quite there" despite "destroying VFL level". At the lower level he was subjected to weekly tagging that lead to significant back stress and soreness, the result of which saw him rested for one match in late May. Upon his return, he logged a magnificent game, including recording 44 disposals, 11 marks, 12 clearances and kicking three goals in a VFL win over the Collingwood reserves. That performance, along with the injured status of Dustin Martin, saw Miles given a chance at AFL level. He recorded 20 disposals and kicked a goal in that Round 12 loss to Port Adelaide before being immediately dropped back to VFL level following Martin's return. Miles was involved in a serious collision and head knock upon his return to VFL level, the result of which saw him rested for one match. He remained with the club's reserves side in the VFL for the rest of the season and played a contributing role in the club's two losing finals, including gathering 19 disposals and kicking a goal in a knock-out semi-final loss to the Essendon reserves side. At season's end he was jointly awarded the J. J. Liston Trophy with Williamstown's Michael Gibbons as the VFL's best and fairest player. Miles also won his second straight Guinane Medal as Richmond's reserves best and fairest. He finished 2018 having played just one match at AFL level.

By the last week of the AFL home-and=away season, media reports had begun to emerge linking Miles to a trade deal with Gold Coast. In early September, AFL Media reported that he had met with Suns officials to discuss a deal; and, in the later part of the month, The Age reported that would be traded there alongside teammate Corey Ellis in the forthcoming player exchange period. Richmond football boss Neil Balme publicly confirmed the reports just three days out from the start of the trade period and suggested the club would seek little in return for the pair's departure.

=== Gold Coast (2019–2020) ===
On the opening day of the 2018 trade period, Miles was traded to Gold Coast along with Ellis in exchange for a swap of future 3rd-round picks.

He played 17 of a possible 22 matches in his first year at the Suns, earning seventh place in the club's best and fairest award. Miles was unable to earn selection at AFL level in 2020, and at season's end he retired from AFL football after a nine-year career.

== Statistics ==
Legend
G	Goals	K	Kicks	D	Disposals	T	Tackles
B	Behinds	H	Handballs	M	Marks

Season	Team	No.	Games	Totals							Averages (per game)						
Season	Team	No.	Games	G	B	K	H	D	M	T	G	B	K	H	D	M	T
2012	Greater Western Sydney	25	7	0	0	74	54	128	34	28	0.0	0.0	10.6	7.7	18.3	4.9	4.0
2013	Greater Western Sydney	25	3	1	1	23	15	38	12	13	0.3	0.3	7.7	5.0	12.7	4.0	4.3
2014	Richmond	26	13	5	4	162	155	317	38	56	0.4	0.3	12.5	11.9	24.4	2.9	4.3
2015	Richmond	26	23	7	6	277	267	544	92	90	0.3	0.3	12.0	11.6	23.7	4.0	3.9
2016	Richmond	26	19	10	1	206	226	432	63	85	0.5	0.1	10.8	11.9	22.7	3.3	4.5
2017	Richmond	26	5	1	0	40	57	97	21	21	0.2	0.0	8.0	11.4	19.4	4.2	4.2
2018	Richmond	26	1	1	0	13	7	20	3	3	1.0	0.0	13.0	7.0	20.0	3.0	3.0
2019	Gold Coast	2	17	6	9	238	126	364	65	66	0.4	0.4	14.0	7.4	21.4	3.8	3.9
2020	Gold Coast	2	0	—	—	—	—	—	—	—	—	—	—	—	—	—	—
Career			88	31	21	1033	907	1940	328	362	0.4	0.2	11.7	10.3	22.0	3.7	4.1

== Honours and achievements ==
Team

- McClelland Trophy (Richmond): 2018

Individual

- AFL
  - Fred Swift Medal (4th RFC B&F): 2015
  - Cosgrove–Jenkins Award (RFC best first-year player): 2014
- VFL
  - J.J. Liston Trophy: 2018
  - 2× Guinane Medal (RFC reserves B&F): 2017, 2018

== Personal life ==
Miles is a practicing Christian. He has two older brothers, Lance and David. and his uncle is former Australian Olympic middle distance runner Pat Scammell.

Miles, along with former teammates Dustin Martin, Reece Conca, Dion Prestia, Toby Nankervis and Josh Caddy, owns a small stake in racehorse Main Stage which ran in the 2017 spring racing carnival.
