= Matt Dea =

Australian rules footballer

Personal information
- Full name: Matthew Dea
- Born: 13 October 1991 (age 35)
- Original team: North Ballarat Rebels (TAC Cup)
- Draft: No. 44, 2009 national draft
- Height: 186 cm (6 ft 1 in)
- Weight: 85 kg (187 lb)
- Position: Defender

Club information
- Current club: Essendon
- Number: 49

Playing career^{1}
Years	Club	Games (Goals)
2010–2015	Richmond	31 (1)
2016-2019	Essendon	39 (1)
Total		70 (2)
- ^{1} Playing statistics correct to the end of 2018.

Matthew Dea (born 13 October 1991) is a former professional Australian rules footballer who played for the Essendon Football Club in the Australian Football League (AFL). He was drafted in the third round of the 2009 AFL draft with the 44th overall pick by Richmond. He made his debut against Melbourne in round 4 of 2010 season. In 2015, he won Richmond's VFL best and fairest award but was delisted in October.

In January 2016, Dea signed with the Essendon Football Club as one of their top-up players in the wake of the club's supplements saga. Under the player top-up rules, he was delisted at the conclusion of the 2016 season, however, in November he re-signed with Essendon during the delisted free agency period.

== Statistics ==
Statistics are correct to the end of the 2016 season

Legend
G	Goals	K	Kicks	D	Disposals	T	Tackles
B	Behinds	H	Handballs	M	Marks

Season	Team	No.	Games	Totals							Averages (per game)						
Season	Team	No.	Games	G	B	K	H	D	M	T	G	B	K	H	D	M	T
2010	Richmond	43	3	0	0	7	24	31	5	10	0.0	0.0	2.3	8.0	10.3	1.7	3.3
2011	Richmond	43	4	0	0	15	21	36	12	9	0.0	0.0	3.8	5.3	9.0	3.0	2.3
2012	Richmond	7	14	0	0	78	87	165	53	23	0.0	0.0	5.6	6.2	11.8	3.8	1.6
2013	Richmond	7	3	0	0	18	13	31	12	5	0.0	0.0	6.0	4.3	10.3	4.0	1.7
2014	Richmond	7	7	1	0	45	44	89	22	10	0.1	0.0	6.4	6.3	12.7	3.1	1.4
2016	Essendon	49	21	0	1	218	139	357	132	48	0.0	0.0	10.4	6.6	17.0	6.3	2.3
Career			52	1	1	381	328	709	236	105	0.0	0.0	7.3	6.3	13.6	4.5	2.0
