= Matthew Arnot =

Australian rules footballer

Personal information
- Full name: Matthew Arnot
- Born: 21 October 1993 (age 33)
- Original team: Oakleigh Chargers
- Draft: 55th overall, 2011; Richmond
- Height: 180 cm (5 ft 11 in)
- Weight: 87 kg (192 lb)
- Position: Half-back / Midfield

Playing career^{1}
Years	Club	Games (Goals)
2013–2015	Richmond	9 (5)
- ^{1} Playing statistics correct to the end of 2015.

Matthew Arnot (born 21 October 1993) is a former professional Australian rules footballer who played for the Richmond Football Club in the Australian Football League (AFL).

Arnot was recruited from the Oakleigh Chargers in the TAC Cup with the 55th selection in the 2011 AFL draft. He made his AFL debut in round 14 of the 2013 AFL season against St Kilda, where his strong tackling was a standout feature. He was delisted at the conclusion of the 2015 season.
