= Ross Smith (Australian footballer, born 1965) =

Australian rules footballer and coach

Personal information
- Born: 3 February 1965 (age 61)
- Original team: Jacana

Playing career^{1}
Years	Club	Games (Goals)
1984–1996	North Melbourne	224 (36)
- ^{1} Playing statistics correct to the end of 1996.

Ross Smith (born 3 February 1965) is the defensive coach at the Richmond Football Club in the Australian Football League (AFL). He is a former Australian rules footballer who played 224 games for AFL club North Melbourne between 1984 and 1996, mainly on the half back line.

In 1997, Smith captain-coached Ainslie to the Australian Capital Territory Football League premiership. He then served as the inaugural captain-coach of the Bendigo Diggers in the Victorian Football League in 1998. Smith joined Richmond as an assistant coach in September 2011, signing a three-year deal. He was previously an assistant coach at Hawthorn for seven years.
