= Brandon Ellis =

Australian rules footballer (born 1993)

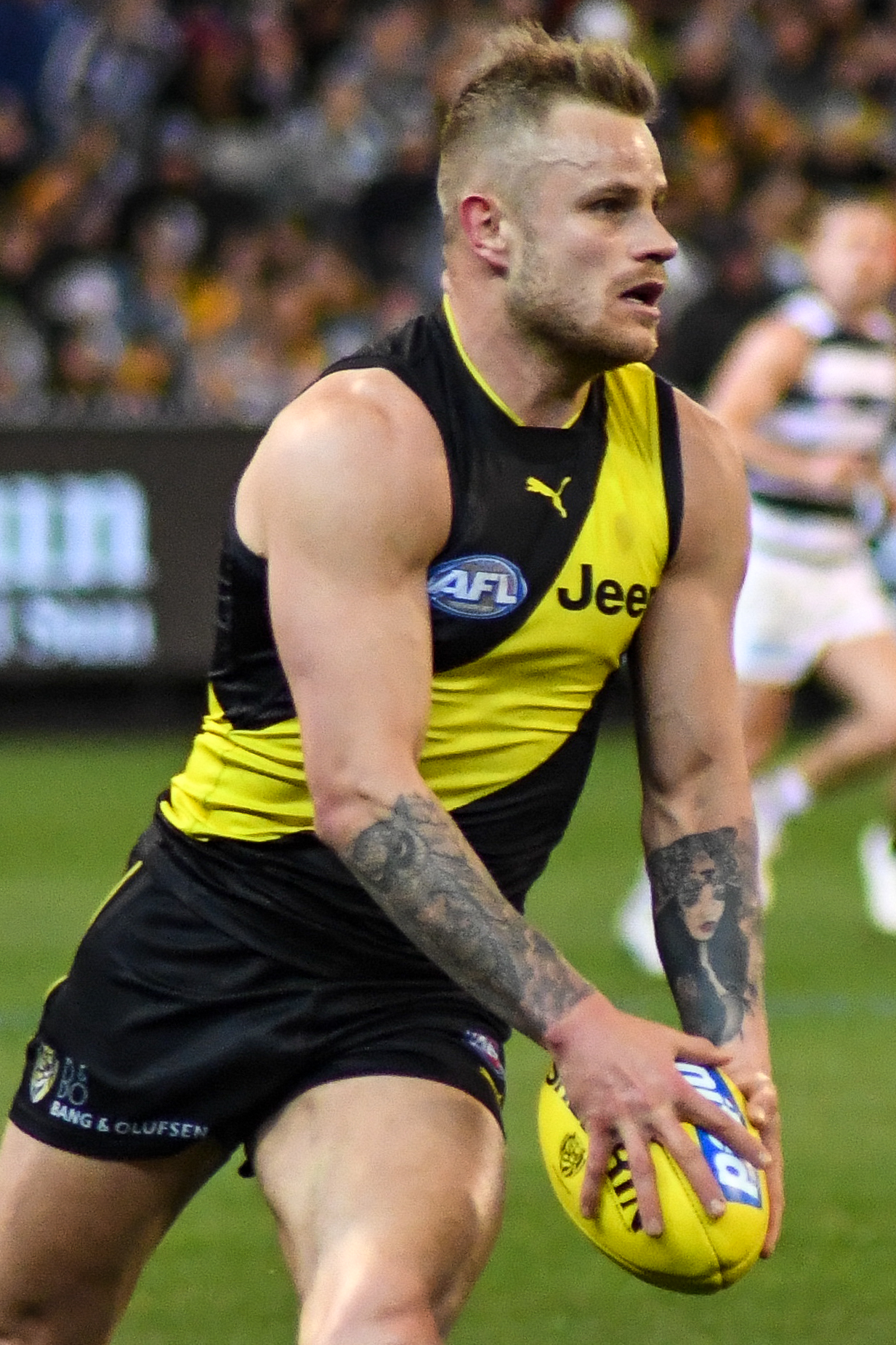
- Ellis playing for Richmond in 2018

Personal information
- Full name: Brandon Ellis
- Nicknames: Beavis, Brando
- Born: 3 August 1993 (age 33)
- Original teams: Calder Cannons (TAC Cup); West Coburg (EDFL)
- Draft: No. 15, 2011 AFL national draft
- Height: 181 cm (5 ft 11 in)
- Weight: 82 kg (181 lb)
- Position: Midfielder / defender

Playing career
Years	Club	Games (Goals)
2012–2019	Richmond	176 (58)
2020–2024	Gold Coast	75 (27)
Total		251 (85)

Career highlights
- 2× AFL premiership player: 2017, 2019; Jack Titus Medal (2nd RFC B&F): 2014; 3× 22under22 team: 2013, 2014, 2015; Yiooken Award: 2015; AFL Rising Star nominee: 2012

Brandon Ellis (born 3 August 1993) is a former professional Australian rules footballer who played for the Richmond Football Club and Gold Coast Suns in the Australian Football League (AFL). He previously played 176 matches over eight seasons at Richmond, including in the 2017 and 2019 premierships.

== Early life and junior football ==
Ellis was raised in the inner-suburb of Carlton North, four kilometres north of Melbourne.

He first played football in the Auskick program in Brunswick at the age of four. At age seven he began playing with the under 10s side at West Coburg, winning the best-and-fairest award despite being many years younger than most of his teammates.

Ellis quit football temporarily in year 10 in the aftermath of his father's terminal cancer diagnoses.

He later played representative football with the Calder Cannons in the TAC Cup where he played 29 games across his bottom and top aged seasons.

He was part of West Coburg's under-18s premiership in 2010, where he was coached by Phil Cleary.

Ellis represented the Victorian Metro side at the 2010 Under 18 national championships. He recorded a 76 per cent disposal efficiency and the most score involvements of any defender in the competition. He earned All-Australian selection for his performances.

Ellis attended high school at Princes Hill Secondary College in the Melbourne suburb of North Carlton.

== AFL career ==
=== Richmond (2012–2019) ===
Ellis was drafted to Richmond with the 15th selection in 2011 National Draft.

He debuted on Round 1 the following season, in a 44-point loss to traditional rivals Carlton. He was nominated for the 2012 AFL Rising Star award in Round 17 after recording 21 disposals and 5 marks in Richmond's close loss to North Melbourne.

In Round 8, 2013 Ellis recorded a career-best 39 disposals in Richmond's 34-point victory over Melbourne. Ellis placed equal fifth at the club in the Brownlow Medal tally that year, recording 5 votes. The same year he was selected in the inaugural AFL Players Association 22under22 team, as one of the best young players in the league.

Ellis received the Jack Titus medal in 2014, for finishing second in the Richmond Best-and-Fairest count. He led the club in disposals and rebound 50s and placed fourth in the club at the Brownlow Medal. He was also nominated to the All-Australian squad of 40 but was ultimately not selected to the final side. That same year he earned his second selection to the AFLPA's 22under22 team.

Ellis had another strong season in 2015, relishing his role as the club's number one outside midfielder. He topped the club for uncontested possessions and ranked second for total disposals. He failed to make an impact in Richmond's losing elimination final however, recording only 10 disposals on the day.

Between round 4 2014 and round 18 2015, Ellis recorded a club record streak of 27 straight matches with 20 or more disposals.

He played his 100th AFL game in Round 12, 2016, against the Gold Coast Suns at the Melbourne Cricket Ground. He finished the season ranked 3rd at the club for disposals in 2016.

In 2017 he changed roles, shifting from the wing and into Richmond's half back line.

After 111 consecutive matches played at AFL level, Ellis was omitted from the Richmond side to face Collingwood in round 6, 2018. It was his first missed match since round 12, 2013. He returned to senior football in round 10, after spending four weeks with the club's reserves side at VFL level. Ellis played the 150th AFL match of his career in round 20's win over Geelong at the MCG. After playing in each of the final 13 matches of the season, Ellis was dropped from the club's side for the Qualifying final against Hawthorn in order to make way from the injury return of All-Australian squad member Kane Lambert.

In 2019 Ellis returned to a role on the wing. He finished the 2019 season by playing in a winning grand final, his second premiership in three seasons at Richmond.

He had played 176 games over eight seasons at Richmond.

=== Gold Coast (2020–2024) ===
On the opening day of the 2019 free agency period, Ellis signed a five-year contract with Gold Coast, officially moving when Richmond declined to match the Suns offer despite his status as a restricted free agent.

Ellis played in 16 of a possible 17 games in his COVID-19 pandemic affected first season at Gold Coast, placing fifth in the club's best and fairest award.

In July 2024, Ellis retired effective immediately.

== Statistics ==
Legend
G	Goals	K	Kicks	D	Disposals	T	Tackles
B	Behinds	H	Handballs	M	Marks

Season	Team	No.	Games	Totals							Averages (per game)							Votes
Season	Team	No.	Games	G	B	K	H	D	M	T	G	B	K	H	D	M	T	Votes
2012	Richmond	42	21	2	8	183	147	330	80	36	0.1	0.4	8.7	7.0	15.7	3.8	1.7	0
2013	Richmond	5	21	14	7	246	144	390	124	45	0.7	0.3	11.7	6.9	18.6	5.9	2.1	5
2014	Richmond	5	23	10	11	355	246	601	126	56	0.4	0.5	15.4	10.7	26.1	5.5	2.4	9
2015	Richmond	5	23	8	11	342	252	594	146	77	0.3	0.5	14.9	11.0	25.8	6.3	3.3	7
2016	Richmond	5	22	5	9	290	230	520	134	56	0.2	0.4	13.2	10.5	23.6	6.1	2.5	3
2017^{#}	Richmond	5	25	7	4	332	226	558	127	51	0.3	0.2	13.3	9.0	22.3	5.1	2.0	1
2018	Richmond	5	18	3	4	202	154	356	87	38	0.2	0.2	11.2	8.6	19.8	4.8	2.1	0
2019^{#}	Richmond	5	23	9	3	269	216	485	116	57	0.4	0.1	11.7	9.4	21.1	5.0	2.5	0
2020 (Note: The 2020 season was played with 17 home-and-away matches per team (down from 22) and 16-minute quarters with time on (down from 20-minute quarters with time on) due to the impact of the COVID-19 pandemic.)	Gold Coast	4	16	5	3	194	99	293	68	41	0.3	0.2	12.1	6.2	18.3	4.3	2.6	0
2021	Gold Coast	4	18	5	2	273	150	423	130	47	0.3	0.1	15.2	8.3	23.5	7.2	2.6	5
2022	Gold Coast	4	21	9	6	314	146	460	115	47	0.4	0.3	15.0	7.0	21.9	5.5	2.2	5
2023	Gold Coast	4	16	7	8	195	93	288	86	37	0.4	0.5	12.2	5.8	18.0	5.4	2.3	0
2024	Gold Coast	4	4	1	2	28	14	42	9	5	0.3	0.5	7.0	3.5	10.5	2.3	1.3	0
Career			251	85	78	3223	2117	5340	1348	593	0.3	0.3	12.8	8.4	21.3	5.4	2.4	35

== Honours and achievements ==
Team

- 2× AFL premiership player (Richmond): 2017, 2019
- McClelland Trophy (Richmond): 2018

Individual

- AFL Rising Star nominee: 2012
- Yiooken Award: 2015
- Jack Titus Medal (2nd RFC B&F): 2014
- 5th place, Gold Coast B&F: 2020
- 3× 22under22 team: 2013, 2014, 2015

== Personal life ==
His father was treated for kidney cancer when Ellis was a child and in 2009, also received a terminal throat cancer diagnoses but overcame the illness through six months of extensive radiation and chemotherapy.

As a child, Ellis grew up and lived in a housing commission flat in Melbourne's inner north. As a teenager he was frequently exposed to the crime prevalent in the area including regular incidents of his clothes being stolen from the flat's shared clothesline, himself thieving clothes from city retailers and watching friends stabbed and assaulted in front of him.
