= Corey Ellis (footballer) =

Australian rules footballer (born 1996)

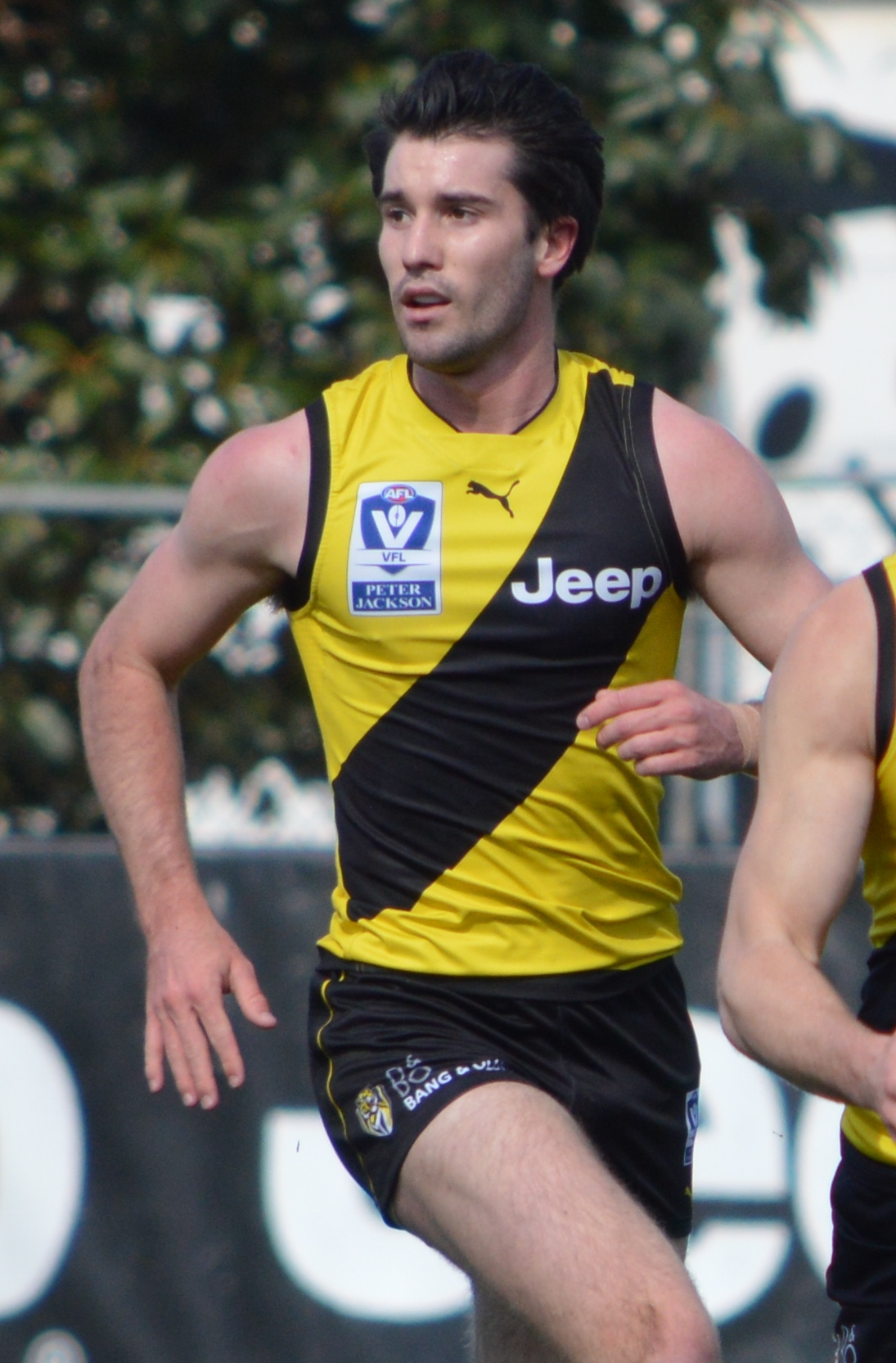
- Ellis with Richmond's VFL team in August 2017

Personal information
- Born: 9 October 1996 (age 30)
- Original team: Western Jets (TAC Cup)
- Draft: No. 12, 2014 AFL National Draft: Richmond
- Debut: Round 5, 2015, Richmond vs. Geelong, at MCG
- Height: 184 cm (6 ft 0 in)
- Weight: 80 kg (176 lb)
- Position: Midfielder

Club information
- Current club: Gold Coast
- Number: 17

Playing career^{1}
Years	Club	Games (Goals)
2015–2018	Richmond	27 (7)
2019–2020	Gold Coast	4 (0)
Total		31 (7)
- ^{1} Playing statistics correct to the end of the 2020 season.

Career highlights
- VFL: VFL grand finalist: 2017

Corey Ellis (born 9 October 1996) is a former professional Australian rules football player for the Gold Coast Football Club in the Australian Football League (AFL). He previously played 27 matches over four years at Richmond after being drafted there with the 12th overall pick in the 2014 AFL National Draft.

== Early life and junior football ==
Ellis played junior football at Keilor in the Essendon District Football League. He played alongside fellow future AFL player Jayden Laverde in eight consecutive premierships, and was awarded best on ground honours on four occasions.

He moved on to play TAC Cup football for the Western Jets. In 2014 he played eight games for the club, averaging totals of 22 disposals and 5 clearances. His best game for the year came against the Northern Territory Thunder, where he recorded 35 disposals, 11 marks and 2 goals. Ellis missed the final match of the season however, when he suffered a stress fracture in his foot.

Prior to the injury Ellis had represented the Victorian Metropolitan side at the 2014 AFL Under 18 Championships. There he recorded averages of 16 disposals and four tackles in four games for the side.

Though he missed the national combine in his draft year as a result of the foot injury, he remained a highly ranked prospect. He was particularly praised for his positional versatility, ball use and decision-making skills.

== AFL career ==
=== Richmond (2015–2018) ===
Ellis was drafted by the Richmond Football Club with their first selection and 12th overall in the 2014 National Draft.

Ellis missed a large share of the club's 2015 pre-season training as he recovered from the foot injury that restricted his draft testing. He made his league debut against Geelong in round 5 of the 2015 season where he recorded 13 disposals and kicked a goal. Ellis was ruled out following the club's round 12 loss against West Coast, suffering a foot injury that would require surgery. It was later revealed that this injury had been caused by a genetic anomaly being that Ellis was born with an extra bone fragment on the outside of each of his feet. Subsequent surgeries removed the fragments from both feet. He did not return to the club's AFL side for the remainder of the 2015 season and finished it having played six games with an average of nine disposals per game.

Despite a limited pre-season training schedule Ellis returned to the club's senior side for round 1 of the 2016 season. He played 11 of the first 12 matches of the season including a round 6 match against Port Adelaide where he recorded a then career-best 23 disposals. Ellis played primarily across half-back in these matches, filling the void left by the injured Bachar Houli. He missed the club's round 14 clash with the Brisbane Lions however, after suffering a groin injury in the week prior. He spent six weeks rehabbing the injury before making his way back to the club's reserves team in August 2016. Ellis did not return to the club's senior team in 2016 despite being available for the last three matches of the season. He finished the season having played 11 matches at an average of 15 disposals and 3.3 tackles per game.

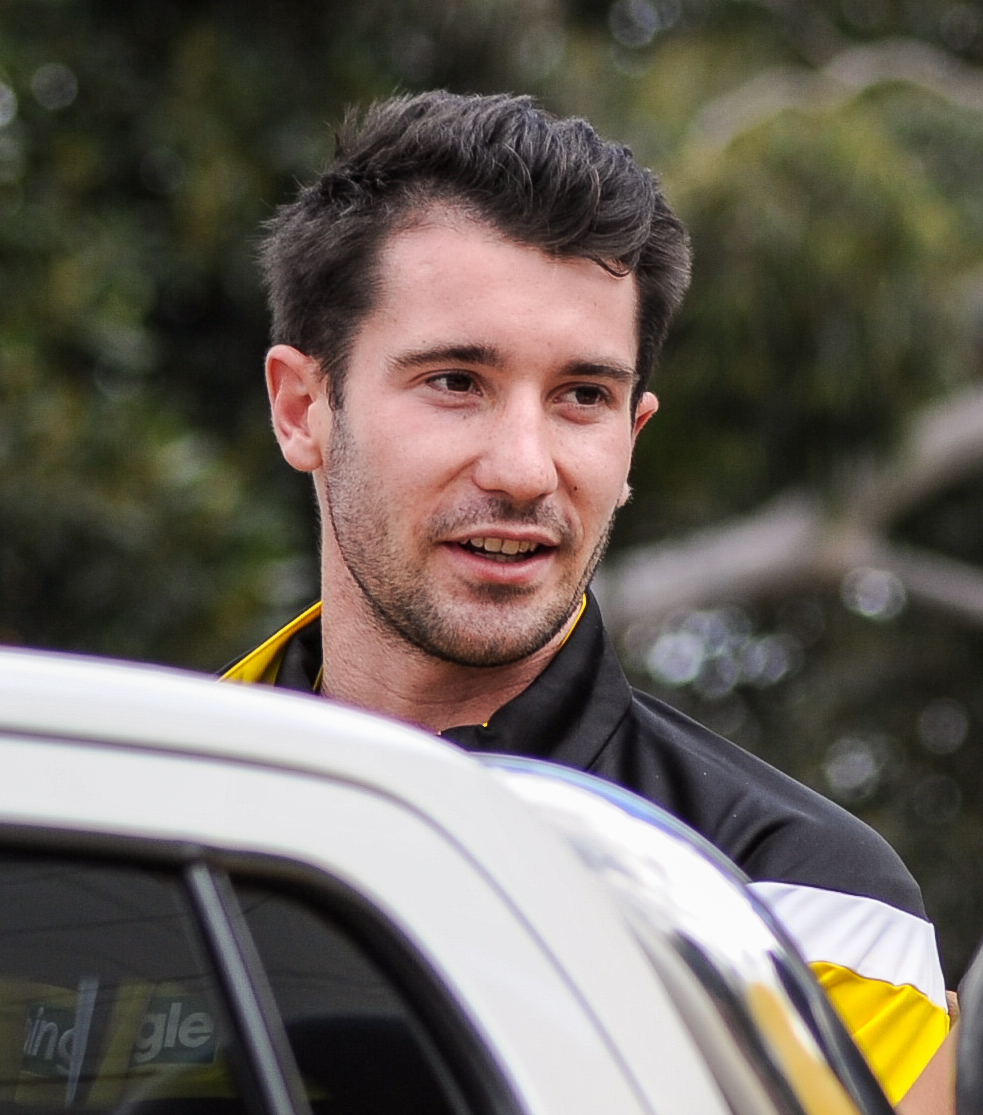
Ellis as Richmond's emergency during the 2017 AFL Grand Final parade

In the early stages of his 2017 pre-season, Ellis saw the continuing effects of the previous year's groin injury. By mid January however, he was back to a full training load. Though he did not start the 2017 season in Richmond's senior side, Ellis made his way into the team by round 7, for the club's match-up with the Western Bulldogs at Etihad Stadium. He was dropped from the side after two weeks, following just 12 disposals and no tackles in the club's round 8 loss to Fremantle. It was ten rounds later before he had another taste of senior football, returning in round 18 against the GWS Giants. Though his contributions were minimal that week, his following fortnight was significant, putting up 14 disposals and goal against Gold Coast and 10 disposals and two goals against Hawthorn in rounds 19 and 20 respectively. He played just one more senior match that season as he was dropped following the round 21 match against Geelong. Ellis' year did not end there however, as he joined Richmond's reserves side in their VFL finals run. This period included playing in three winning finals and in the club's losing grand final against Port Melbourne. The following week he was named as an emergency, but did not play, in Richmond's AFL Grand Final team. Despite having no significant injury troubles, he finished the 2017 season having played just six AFL matches.

For the first time in his young career Ellis would complete a full slate of pre-season training leading into the 2018 AFL season. This work saw him play in both of the club's official pre-season matches before being selected to play in round 1's season opener against Carlton. Ellis was relatively ineffectual over the season's first two matches however, recording 23 disposals and five tackles in total before being subsequently dropped from Richmond's round 3 side. Despite his inability to impact at senior level, Ellis was immediately impressive in his first reserves match of the season, recording 32 disposals and nine tackles in Richmond's VFL win over Port Melbourne. He remained in a wing and half back role at the lower level for a further six weeks, before transitioning to play predominantly as an inside midfielder. A strong vein of form in that role, including a team-high 27 disposals in a VFL match in late June, saw Ellis earn a second chance at AFL football that year. He would again fail to convert his form to the top level however, managing only 23 combined disposals in his two matches across rounds 16 and 17. Ellis was forced to return to VFL football, where he remained for the rest of the regular season and finals series. He played a contributing role across the club's two losing finals, including gathering 23 disposals in a knock-out semi-final loss to the Essendon reserves side. Ellis finished the season having played four matches at AFL level and a further 18 with the club's reserves side in the VFL.

During the final days of Richmond's 2018 AFL finals series, media reports began to emerge linking Ellis to a trade deal with Gold Coast. Within a week, The Age reported that he had agreed to terms on a two-year deal with the Suns and would be traded there alongside teammate Anthony Miles pending an agreement between the two clubs in the forthcoming player exchange period. Richmond football boss Neil Balme publicly confirmed the reports just three days out from the start of the trade period and suggested the club would seek little in return for the pair's departure.

=== Gold Coast (2019–2020) ===
On the opening day of the 2018 trade period Ellis was traded to Gold Coast along with Miles in exchange for a swap of future 3rd round picks.

After 4 games with the Gold Coast, Ellis was dropped at the end of the 2020 season.

== VFL career ==
=== Coburg (2021–Present) ===
Ellis signed for Coburg for the 2021 season.

== Statistics ==
Statistics are correct to the end of the 2018 season

Legend
G	Goals	K	Kicks	D	Disposals	T	Tackles
B	Behinds	H	Handballs	M	Marks

Season	Team	No.	Games	Totals							Averages (per game)						
Season	Team	No.	Games	G	B	K	H	D	M	T	G	B	K	H	D	M	T
2015	Richmond	32	6	3	1	20	28	48	11	10	0.5	0.2	3.3	4.7	8.0	1.8	1.7
2016	Richmond	32	11	1	3	97	71	168	33	33	0.1	0.3	8.8	6.5	15.3	3.0	3.0
2017	Richmond	32	6	3	0	30	30	60	14	13	0.5	0.0	5.0	5.0	10.0	2.3	2.2
2018	Richmond	32	4	0	0	15	31	46	9	11	0.0	0.3	3.8	7.8	11.5	2.3	2.8
Career			27	7	5	162	160	322	67	67	0.3	0.2	6.0	5.9	11.9	2.5	2.5

== Honours and achievements ==
Team

- McClelland Trophy (Richmond): 2018
