= Jake Batchelor =

Australian rules footballer (born 1992)

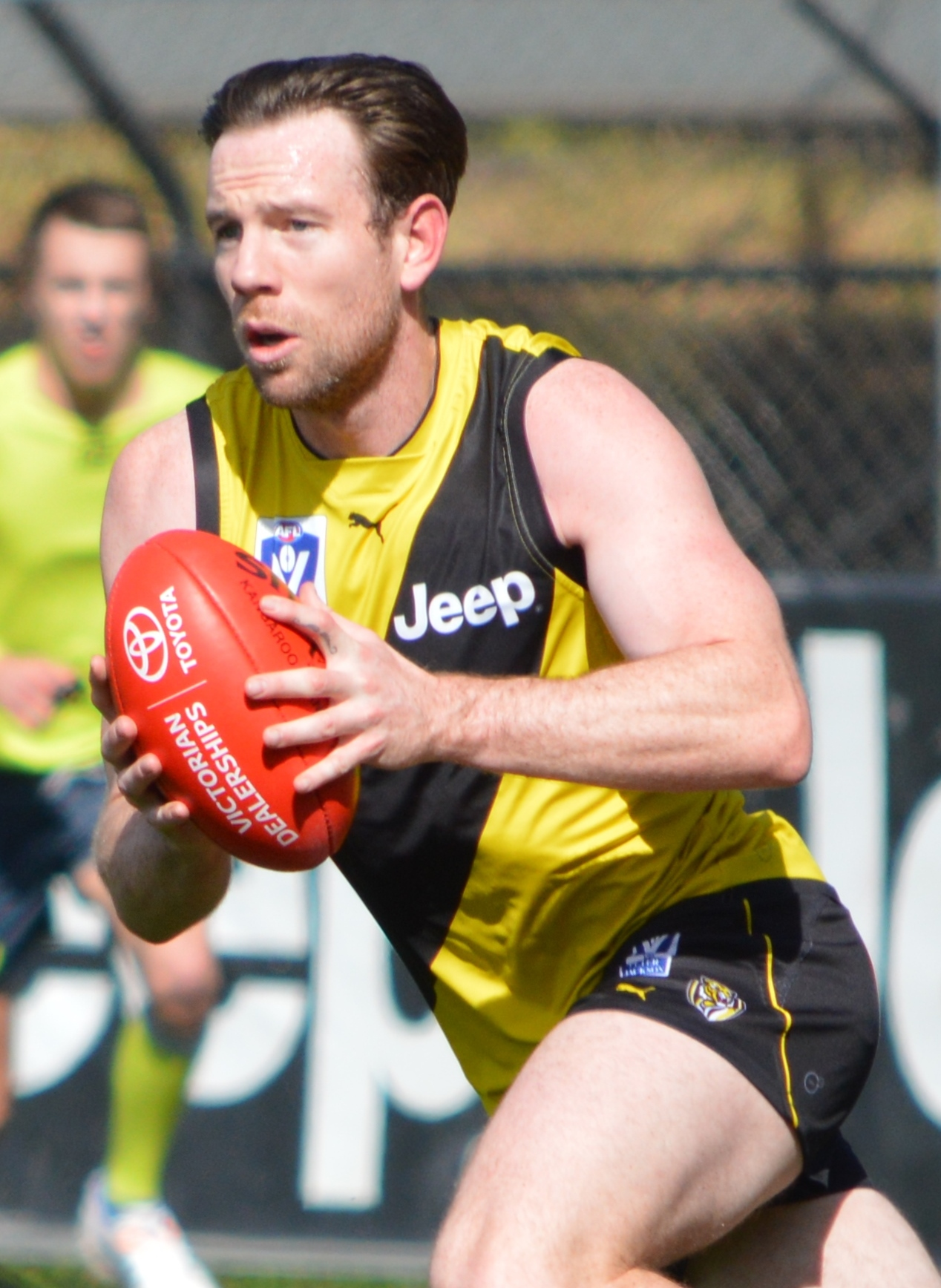
- Batchelor in August 2017

Personal information
- Born: 13 February 1992 (age 34)
- Original teams: Dandenong Stingrays (TAC Cup); Frankston Bombers (MPNFL)
- Draft: No. 30, 2010 national draft
- Debut: Round 1, 2011, Richmond vs. Carlton, at MCG
- Height: 188 cm (6 ft 2 in)
- Weight: 87 kg (192 lb)
- Position: Defender

Playing career^{1}
Years	Club	Games (Goals)
2011–2017	Richmond	84 (4)
- ^{1} Playing statistics correct to the end of 2017.

Career highlights
- AFL Rising Star nominee: 2011

Jake Batchelor (born 13 February 1992) is a former professional Australian rules footballer who played for the Richmond Football Club in the Australian Football League (AFL). Batchelor played his junior footy at the Frankston Rovers in Victoria and went on to play with the Dandenong Stingrays in the TAC Cup, he was drafted to Richmond with their second selection, the 30th overall, in the 2010 AFL draft. He made his AFL debut in round 1, 2011 against Carlton at the MCG. At the end of round 16, 2011, he was nominated for the NAB AFL Rising Star award. Batchelor was delisted by Richmond at the conclusion of the 2017 AFL season, after playing 84 matches over his seven-year tenure at the club. In 2018 he served as a playing assistant coach with the Frankston Dolphins in the VFL and in 2019 will take up a part-time development coaching role at St Kilda.

== Statistics ==
Statistics are correct to the end of the 2017 season

Legend
G	Goals	K	Kicks	D	Disposals	T	Tackles
B	Behinds	H	Handballs	M	Marks

Season	Team	No.	Games	Totals							Averages (per game)						
Season	Team	No.	Games	G	B	K	H	D	M	T	G	B	K	H	D	M	T
2011	Richmond	31	16	0	4	125	77	202	52	49	0.0	0.3	7.8	4.8	12.6	3.3	3.1
2012	Richmond	11	14	0	1	121	94	215	70	28	0.0	0.1	8.6	6.7	15.4	5.0	2.0
2013	Richmond	11	9	0	1	75	29	104	40	17	0.0	0.1	8.3	3.2	11.6	4.4	1.9
2014	Richmond	11	13	3	0	80	45	125	38	27	0.2	0.0	6.2	3.5	9.6	2.9	2.1
2015	Richmond	11	23	1	1	178	105	283	111	44	0.0	0.0	7.7	4.6	12.3	4.8	1.9
2016	Richmond	11	8	0	1	58	28	86	21	7	0.0	0.1	7.3	3.5	10.8	2.6	0.9
2017	Richmond	11	1	0	0	5	4	9	2	4	0.0	0.0	5.0	4.0	9.0	2.0	4.0
Career			84	4	8	642	382	1024	334	176	0.0	0.1	7.6	4.5	12.2	4.0	2.1
