= Ben Griffiths =

Australian rules footballer (born 1991)

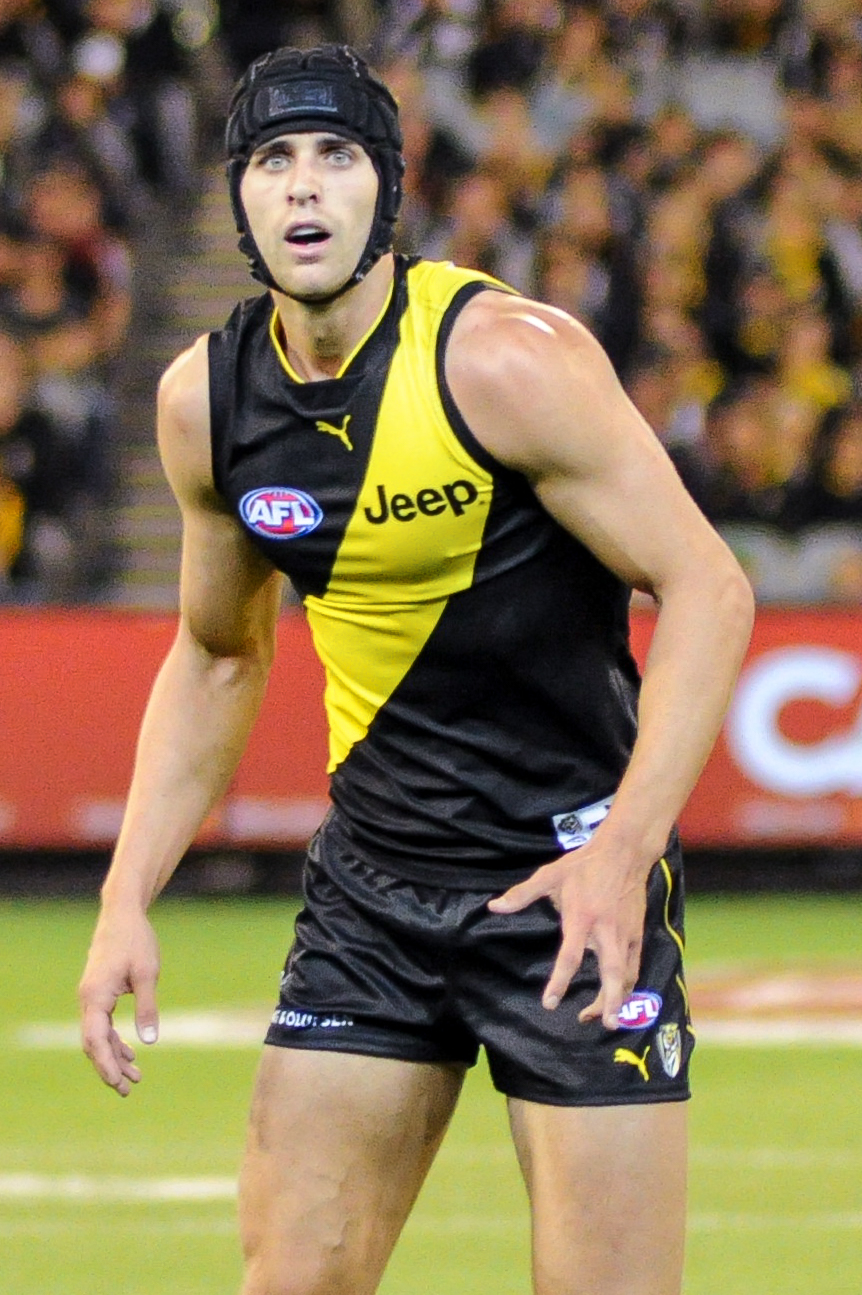
- Griffiths in March 2017

Personal information
- Born: 17 September 1991 (age 35)
- Height: 200 cm (6 ft 7 in)
- Weight: 101 kg (223 lb)
Australian rules football career
Personal information
- Original team: Eastern Ranges (TAC Cup)
- Draft: No. 19, 2009 national draft
- Debut: Round 10, 2010, Richmond vs. Port Adelaide, at AAMI Stadium
- Position: Forward / ruck
Playing career^{1}
| Years | Club | Games (Goals) |
| 2010–2017 | Richmond | 63 (42) |
- ^{1} Playing statistics correct to the end of 2017.

Sport
- Football career

Profile
- Position: Punter

Career information
- College: USC Trojans (2019–2021)

Ben Griffiths (born 17 September 1991) is a former professional Australian rules footballer who played for the Richmond Football Club in the Australian Football League (AFL).

== AFL career ==
Griffiths was drafted by Richmond with the club's second selection and the 19th selection overall in the 2009 national draft.

He made his debut in Richmond's first win of the following year, against Port Adelaide in round 10 of the 2010 season.

Griffiths career was limited because of the number of times he was concussed during a game.

== Transition to gridiron football ==
=== College career ===
Despite being contracted to Richmond until the end of the 2018 season, Griffiths retired from the AFL in January 2018 after receiving a scholarship with the University of Southern California to pursue a college football career as a punter and transitioning to playing American football.

=== Professional career ===
Griffiths was selected in the first round (9th overall) of the 2022 CFL global draft by the Edmonton Elks of the Canadian Football League.

== Statistics ==
Statistics are correct to the end of the 2017 season

Legend
| G | Goals | K | Kicks | D | Disposals | T | Tackles |
| B | Behinds | H | Handballs | M | Marks |

| Season | Team | No. | Games | Totals | | | | | | | Averages (per game) | | | | | | |
| Season | Team | No. | Games | G | B | K | H | D | M | T | G | B | K | H | D | M | T |
|---|---|---|---|---|---|---|---|---|---|---|---|---|---|---|---|---|---|
| 2010 | Richmond | 38 | 5 | 3 | 0 | 8 | 11 | 19 | 4 | 6 | 0.6 | 0.0 | 1.6 | 2.2 | 3.8 | 0.8 | 1.2 |
| 2011 | Richmond | 38 | 4 | 1 | 4 | 15 | 11 | 26 | 12 | 3 | 0.3 | 1.0 | 3.8 | 2.8 | 6.5 | 3.0 | 0.8 |
| 2012 | Richmond | 24 | 9 | 0 | 0 | 41 | 42 | 83 | 21 | 9 | 0.0 | 0.0 | 4.6 | 4.7 | 9.2 | 2.3 | 1.0 |
| 2013 | Richmond | 24 | 1 | 0 | 0 | 3 | 3 | 6 | 3 | 2 | 0.0 | 0.0 | 3.0 | 3.0 | 6.0 | 3.0 | 2.0 |
| 2014 | Richmond | 24 | 16 | 12 | 15 | 101 | 43 | 144 | 71 | 44 | 0.8 | 0.9 | 6.3 | 2.7 | 9.0 | 4.4 | 2.8 |
| 2015 | Richmond | 24 | 13 | 12 | 14 | 85 | 41 | 126 | 59 | 23 | 0.9 | 1.1 | 6.5 | 3.2 | 9.7 | 4.5 | 1.8 |
| 2016 | Richmond | 24 | 13 | 14 | 10 | 83 | 56 | 139 | 61 | 36 | 1.1 | 0.8 | 6.4 | 4.3 | 10.7 | 4.7 | 2.8 |
| 2017 | Richmond | 24 | 2 | 0 | 1 | 10 | 5 | 15 | 8 | 6 | 0.0 | 0.5 | 5.0 | 2.5 | 7.5 | 4.0 | 3.0 |
| Career | | | 63 | 42 | 44 | 346 | 212 | 558 | 239 | 129 | 0.7 | 0.7 | 5.5 | 3.4 | 8.9 | 3.8 | 2.0 |
