= Jack Ross (footballer, born 2000) =

Australian rules footballer

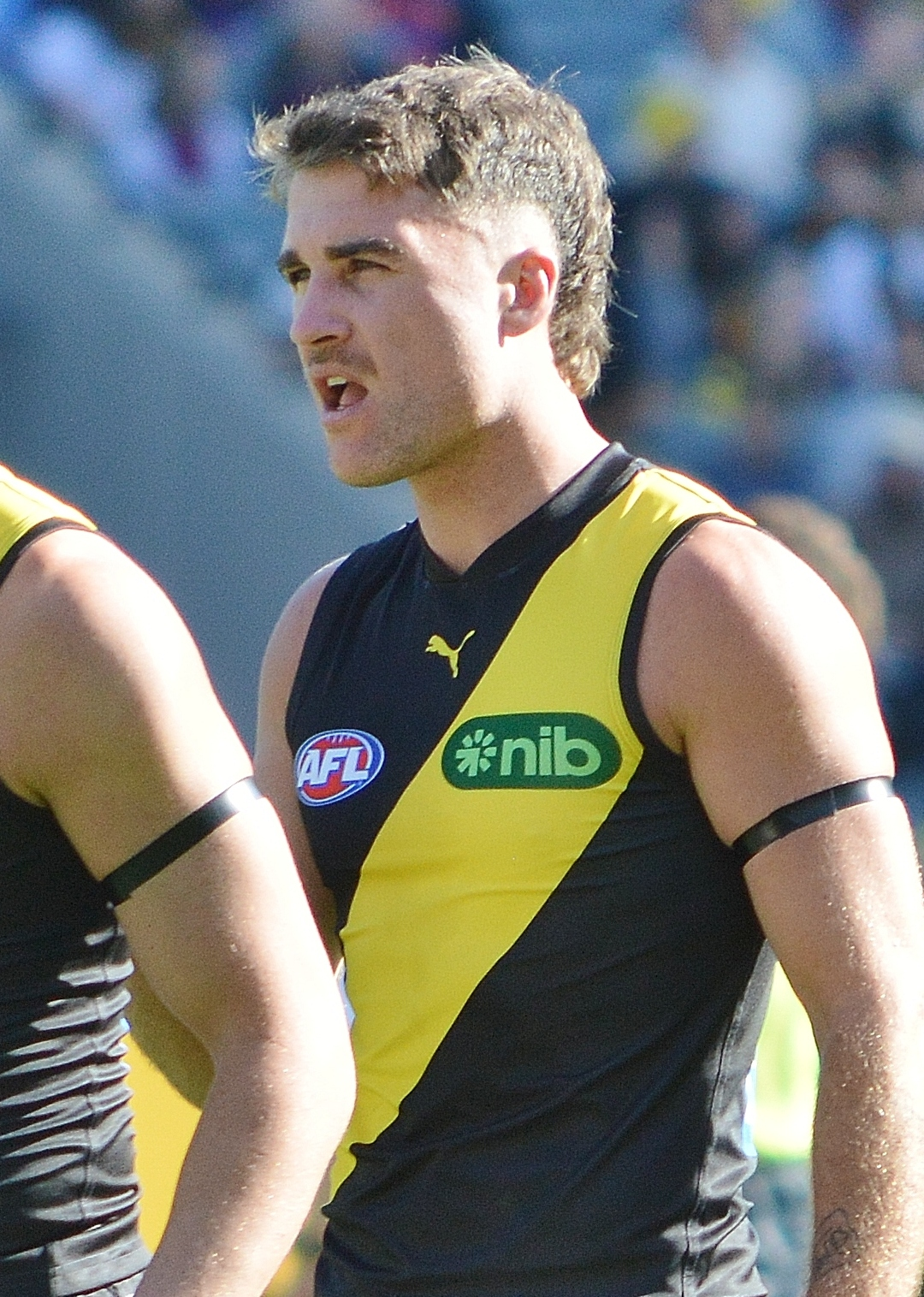
- Ross with Richmond in April 2025

Personal information
- Born: 3 September 2000 (age 26)
- Original team: Oakleigh Chargers (TAC Cup)
- Draft: No. 43, 2018 AFL national draft
- Debut: Round 4, 2019, Richmond vs. Port Adelaide, at Adelaide Oval
- Height: 187 cm (6 ft 2 in)
- Weight: 85 kg (187 lb)
- Position: Midfielder

Club information
- Current club: Richmond
- Number: 5

Playing career^{1}
Years	Club	Games (Goals)
2019–	Richmond	112 (25)
- ^{1} Playing statistics correct to the end of 2026.

Career highlights
- Junior: Oakleigh Chargers best & fairest: 2018; U16 Vic Metro captain: 2016

Jack Ross (born 3 September 2000) is a professional Australian rules footballer playing for the Richmond Football Club in the Australian Football League (AFL). He played junior representative football with the Oakliegh Chargers in the TAC Cup and won the club's best and fairest player award in 2018. He was drafted by Richmond with the 43rd pick in 2018 AFL draft and made his debut in round 4 of the 2019 season.

== Early life and junior football ==
Ross played junior football with the Waverley Park Hawks in the South Metro Junior Football League, before moving to representative football with the Oakleigh Chargers.

In 2016 he earned selection to and captained the Victorian Metropolitan side at the 2016 Under 16 national championships. The following year he played one match for Oakleigh in the TAC Cup.

Despite captaining the side at the lower age group, Ross failed to earn selection for Vic Metro at the Under 18 championships in mid-2018. He was prolific at state level however, performing strongly in the second half of 2018 including averaging 25 disposals in the final five matches of the season. He was particularly influential in the club's finals series, named one of the best players in Oakleigh's preliminary final and recording 19 disposals along with a goal in the club's losing grand final. For his performances that season, Ross earned the club's best and fairest award.

Ross attended high school and played school football at Caulfield Grammar, where he also served as the school's football team captain in 2018.

At the end of the 2018 junior season, Ross was not invited to the AFL National draft combine, but instead participated in the Victorian state combine. He was noted pre-draft for his strength, power and ball-winning ability and was labelled by Aussie Rules Draft Central as "a ready-made prospect".

=== Junior statistics ===
Legend
G	Goals	K	Kicks	D	Disposals	T	Tackles
B	Behinds	H	Handballs	M	Marks

TAC Cup

Season	Team	No.	Games	Totals							Averages (per game)						
Season	Team	No.	Games	G	B	K	H	D	M	T	G	B	K	H	D	M	T
2017	Oakleigh Chargers	32	1	0	—	8	8	16	3	2	0.0	—	8.0	8.0	16.0	3.0	2.0
2018	Oakleigh Chargers	32	12	7	—	103	149	252	56	31	0.6	—	8.6	12.4	21.0	4.7	2.6
Career			13	7	—	111	157	268	159	33	0.5	—	8.5	12.1	20.6	4.5	2.5

== AFL career ==
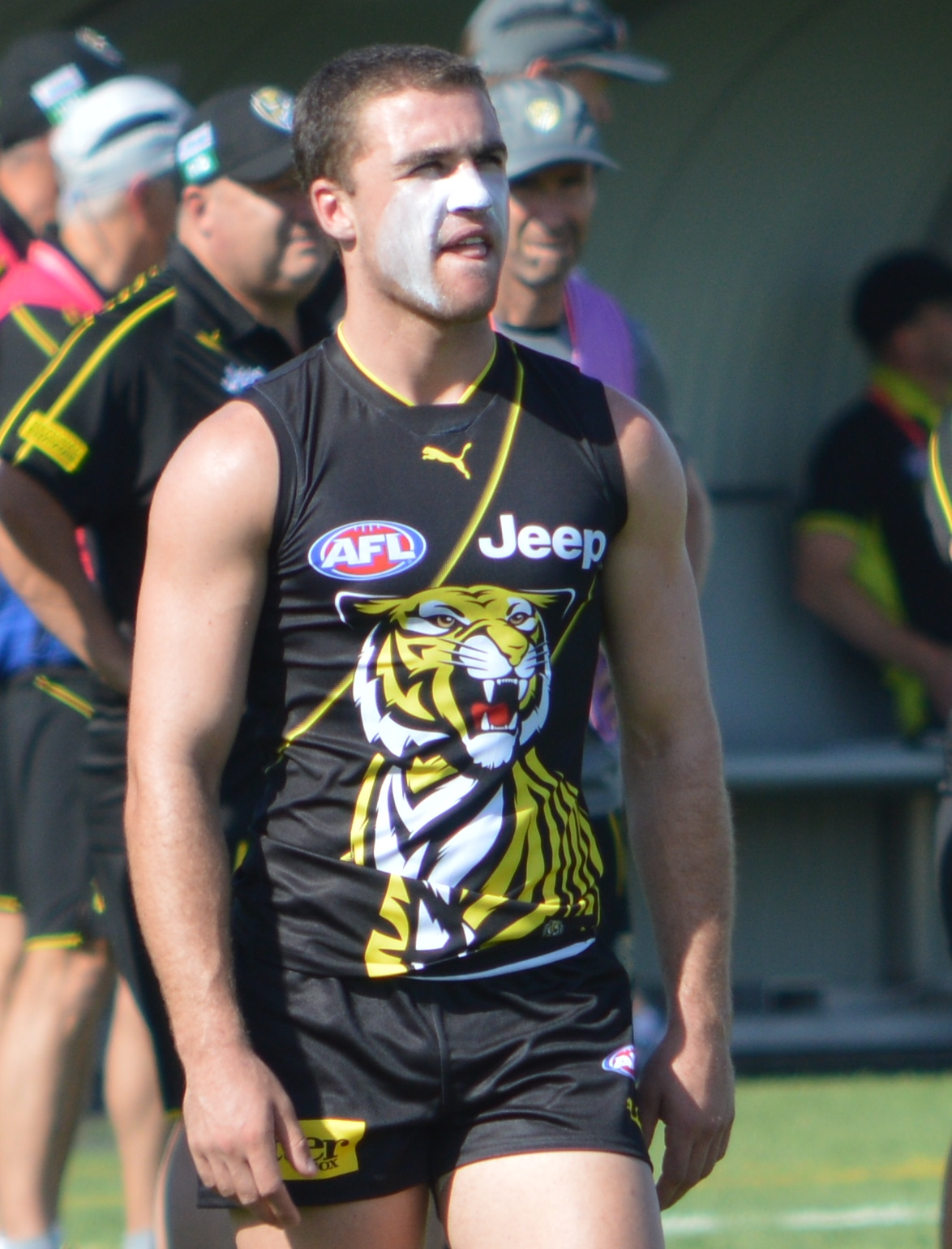
Ross in the 2019 pre-season series

Ross was drafted by Richmond with the club's second pick and the 43rd selection overall in the 2018 AFL national draft.

His first game in the middle - I haven't seen a more impressive first game.

— Damien Hardwick, Richmond coach, on Ross' AFL debut

He made his first appearance for the club in an AFL pre-season match against Melbourne in Shepparton. Ross recorded six clearances and 21 disposals in the match and earned selection in the club second and final pre-season match where he was less influential, posting just seven disposals. Those performance were not enough to earn him an AFL debut, with Ross instead playing in two pre-season matches with the club's reserves side where he averaged 33.5 disposals per match. He played again at the lower level in the opening round of the VFL season, recording 21 disposals, four clearances and eight tackles. The following week Ross would receive a call-up for a round 4 AFL debut, after captain Trent Cotchin was ruled out due to a hamstring and fellow midfielder Dustin Martin missed through suspension. He made a significant impact in the match, recording 25 disposals in the victory over Port Adelaide on the road. Ross added 17 disposals the following week before posting 28 in an ANZAC Day eve win over Melbourne in round 6. Over that initial three match period, Ross led all Rising Star eligible players in handballs per game while ranking second in disposals, metres gained and center clearances per game. He kicked his first AFL goal the following week in round 7, before travelling to Perth for a round 8 match against Fremantle. Ross suffered a serious ankle injury that week, with a Fremantle captain Nat Fyfe inadvertently stepping on and rolling Ross' left ankle just before half time of that match. The injury would be revealed as a syndesmosis strain that would require surgery, ruling Ross out for between six and eight weeks. To that point, he ranked first for centre clearances per game, second for clearances per game and second for inside 50s per game among Rising Star eligible players. Ross resumed running exercises in late June, with his return timetable pushed out two weeks later than first expected. After training fully in the last week of July, Ross made his footballing return on limited minutes with the club's reserves side in the VFL, notching 12 disposals in the match's first half. He was added to the club's AFL emergency list the following week and was eventually called in to play when Dustin Martin was a late withdrawal due to injury. Ross played a run-with role on Carlton captain Patrick Cripps for parts of that match, while accumulating 21 disposals and six clearances of his own. He managed just 11 disposals the following week against West Coast and was dropped back to VFL level for the start of that team's final series. In the opening week of the VFL finals, Ross recorded 21 disposals as Richmond won a come-from-behind qualifying final win over the Essendon reserves. He was named as an AFL level finals emergency the following week, before lining up in a VFL preliminary final as Richmond's reserves won through to that league's grand final. Ross was again an AFL emergency for the top level preliminary final the following week, and after AFL midfielder Jack Graham suffered a shoulder dislocation in that match, Ross was labelled by media outlets as a likely replacement in the upcoming AFL grand final. As a result, he was held out from playing in the club's victorious VFL grand final two days later. Despite that decision Ross was ultimately overlooked for a call up to what would be an AFL premiership winning side, passed over in favour of VFL grand final best-on-ground Marlion Pickett. He was instead named an emergency, ultimately becoming one of just six players on the Richmond list to play in neither the AFL nor VFL premiership winning sides that season. He finished 2019 having played seven matches at AFL level as well as four with the club's reserves side in the VFL.

=== 2020 season ===
In the 2019/20 off-season Ross switched guernsey numbers, adopting the number five previously worn by departing free agent Brandon Ellis. He spent the summer reducing body weight in order to improve his burst speed and ability to play as a winger. He played in the club's first pre-season series match but was dropped to reserves level for the second and final match following the return of the club's midfield leaders from State of Origin duties. Instead, he participated in a VFL practice match in the first week March and was scheduled to play in another the following week that was eventually cancelled due to safety concerns as a result of the rapid progression of the coronavirus pandemic into Australia. Ross could not earn selection to AFL level when the season began a week later, and was instead a non-playing emergency for the win over Carlton that was played without crowds in attendance due to public health prohibitions on large gatherings. In what was the first of what the league planned would be a reduced 17-round season, the match was also played with quarter lengths reduced by one fifth in order to reduce the physical load on players who would be expected to play multiple matches with short breaks in the second half of the year. Just three days later, the AFL Commission suspended the season for an indefinite period after multiple states enforced quarantine conditions on their borders that effectively ruled out the possibility of continuing the season as planned. Ross was a non-playing emergency when the season resumed after an 11-week hiatus, instead playing an unofficial scratch match against Collingwood's reserves that same week due to AFL clubs' withdrawal from the VFL season. He was sufficiently impressive in a new flexibility-testing half-back role at the lower level to earn his first AFL call up of the season in a round 3 loss to Hawthorn. Ross split time playing as a midfielder and half-back over that and one further match at AFL level before being dropped from the club's round 5 side. He spent four weeks out of the side, during which time the club and all its Victorian counterparts were relocated to the Gold Coast in response to a virus outbreak in Melbourne. Ross earned another AFL opportunity in round 9, this time playing as a midfielder following a strong display in that role during an extraordinary mixed-club practice match in which he played alongside other non-selected players from both Melbourne and Geelong. He posted a season-best 17 disposals in round 9 and held his spot at AFL level for a further two matches before being dropped from the club's round 12 side. While he continued to be used as a non-playing emergency over the next month, Ross' next AFL opportunity came in a round 17 win over Geelong. Ross was returned to reserves level after totaling 25 disposals across that match and the club's regular-season ending round 18 win over Adelaide, due in part to the return from injury of first choice midfielders Dion Prestia and Shane Edwards. He remained unable to earn AFL selection through the club's premiership-winning finals run, finishing the season having played seven matches at senior level.

In round 7, 2026, Ross captained Richmond for the first time, due to injuries to captain Toby Nankervis and vice-captain Tim Taranto.

== Player profile ==
Ross plays as a contested ball-winning inside midfielder. Along with his ball-winning, he is notable for his tackle skills and pressure.

== Statistics ==
Updated to the end of round 22, 2026.

Legend
G	Goals	K	Kicks	D	Disposals	T	Tackles
B	Behinds	H	Handballs	M	Marks

Season	Team	No.	Games	Totals							Averages (per game)							Votes
Season	Team	No.	Games	G	B	K	H	D	M	T	G	B	K	H	D	M	T	Votes
2019	Richmond	27	7	1	2	58	63	121	17	22	0.1	0.3	8.3	9.0	17.3	2.4	3.1	0
2020 (Note: The 2020 season was played with 17 home-and-away matches per team (down from 22) and 16-minute quarters with time on (down from 20-minute quarters with time on) due to the impact of the COVID-19 pandemic.)	Richmond	5	7	0	0	48	45	93	14	21	0.0	0.0	6.9	6.4	13.3	2.0	3.0	0
2021	Richmond	5	15	2	0	77	82	159	43	22	0.1	0.0	5.1	5.5	10.6	2.9	1.5	0
2022	Richmond	5	15	3	1	123	126	249	68	20	0.2	0.1	8.2	8.4	16.6	4.5	1.3	0
2023	Richmond	5	19	8	4	185	161	346	100	35	0.4	0.2	9.7	8.5	18.2	5.3	1.8	0
2024	Richmond	5	7	1	0	57	70	127	26	12	0.1	0.0	8.1	10.0	18.1	3.7	1.7	0
2025	Richmond	5	23	4	6	188	252	440	98	89	0.2	0.3	8.2	11.0	19.1	4.3	3.9	0
2026	Richmond	5	17	5	7	144	249	393	61	75	0.3	0.4	8.5	14.6	23.1	3.6	4.4	0
Career			110	24	20	880	1048	1928	427	296	0.2	0.2	8.0	9.5	17.5	3.9	2.7	0

== Honours and achievements ==
Junior

- Oakleigh Chargers best & fairest: 2018
- U16 Vic Metro captain: 2016
