= 2019 AFL Grand Final =

Grand final of the 2019 Australian Football League season

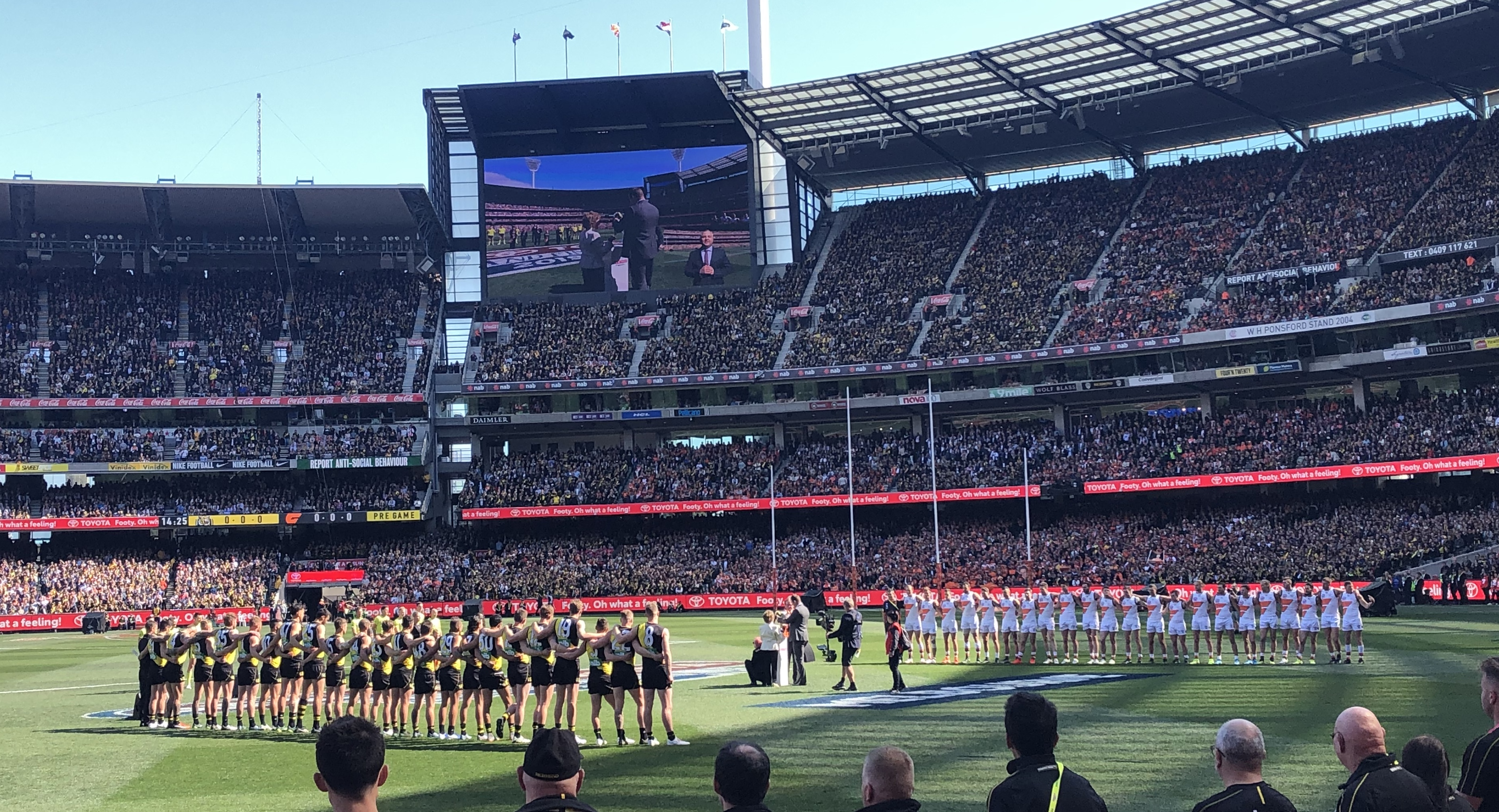
- The teams line up for the National Anthem at the 2019 AFL Grand Final

Richmond	Greater Western Sydney
17.12 (114)	3.7 (25)
	1	2	3	4
RIC	2.3 (15)	7.5 (47)	12.9 (81)	17.12 (114)
GWS	1.2 (8)	1.6 (12)	2.7 (19)	3.7 (25)
- Date: 28 September 2019, 2:30 pm
- Stadium: Melbourne Cricket Ground
- Attendance: 100,014
- Favourite: Richmond
- Umpires: Matt Stevic, Shaun Ryan, Ray Chamberlain
- Coin toss won by: Richmond
- Kicked toward: City End

Ceremonies
- Pre-match entertainment: Paul Kelly, Dean Lewis, Tones and I, John Williamson, Mike Brady
- National anthem: Conrad Sewell
- Post-match entertainment: Dean Lewis

Accolades
- Norm Smith Medallist: Dustin Martin
- Jock McHale Medallist: Damien Hardwick

Broadcast in Australia
- Network: Seven Network
- Commentators: Bruce McAvaney (host and commentator); Hamish McLachlan (host and master of ceremonies); Brian Taylor (commentator); Wayne Carey (expert commentator); Cameron Ling (expert commentator); Daisy Pearce (boundary rider); Matthew Richardson (boundary rider); Leigh Matthews (analyst)

The 2019 AFL Grand Final was an Australian rules football game contested between the Richmond Football Club and Greater Western Sydney Giants at the Melbourne Cricket Ground on 28 September 2019. It was the 124th annual grand final of the Australian Football League (formerly Victorian Football League), staged to determine the premiers for the 2019 AFL season. The match, attended by 100,014 spectators, was won by Richmond by a margin of 89 points, marking the club's twelfth VFL/AFL premiership and their second in three seasons. Richmond's Dustin Martin won the Norm Smith Medal as the player judged best on ground.

== Background ==
After ending a 37-year premiership drought in 2017, then winning the 2018 minor premiership but being eliminated by Collingwood in the preliminary final, Richmond still entered the season considered a strong chance at the premiership, after retaining the core of its 2017 team and adding key forward Tom Lynch from Gold Coast. Richmond suffered misfortune during the first half of the season, with several of their star players sidelined due to injury – including star defender Alex Rance, and young stars in Jack Higgins, Sydney Stack and Jack Graham. At the conclusion of Round 14, the Tigers were ninth on the ladder with an average 7–6 win–loss record; however, they did not lose again in the home-and-away season, winning their last nine games to finish third with a 16–6 record. The Tigers advanced directly to the preliminary final after a 47-point victory over Brisbane in the qualifying final; then, in the preliminary final, overcame a 21-point half time deficit to defeat Geelong by 19 points.

Greater Western Sydney started season 2019 having been eliminated from the 2018 season in the semi-finals. The club lost co-captain Callan Ward to an ACL injury early in the season, a season-ending injury to star midfielder Stephen Coniglio later in the year. A strong start to the year saw the Giants placed second after Round 11, but indifferent form and a 5–6 record in the second half of the year, saw the Giants qualify for the finals in sixth with a 13–9 win–loss record. However, strong form in September saw the Giants win three finals to qualify for the grand final: a dominant win against Western Bulldogs by 58 points in the elimination final, then two thrilling victories – a three-point win over Brisbane in the semi-final, and a four-point win against Collingwood in the preliminary final. It was just the second time since the introduction of the AFL final eight system in 2000 that a team reached the grand final without finishing inside the top four, after the Bulldogs' 2016 victory.

The teams met twice during the home-and-away season; first in round 3 at Giants Stadium when the Giants thrashed Richmond by 49 points, and then in round 17 at the MCG when the Tigers won by 27 points.

It was Richmond's 23rd grand final appearance, and second in three years; and it was the first grand final appearance for Greater Western Sydney. The sides had previously contested one final, the 2017 preliminary final won by Richmond by 36 points. It was the eighth consecutive grand final which featured one Victorian team and one non-Victorian team, and it was only the second grand final in VFL/AFL history (and the first since 1980) that did not feature either team that finished first or second on the ladder at the conclusion of the home-and-away season.

As the higher-ranked team, Richmond wore its full home kit, and GWS wore its predominantly white clash guernsey with white shorts. Richmond was an overwhelming favourite to win, with bookmakers offering odds of $1.44 for a Richmond win compared with $3.25 for a Giants win.

With an average audience of 2.197 million across the five major capital cities, this was the lowest-rating AFL Grand Final on free-to-air television since OzTAM began recording television ratings in 2001.

== Entertainment ==
Tones and I performed "The Kids Are Coming" and "Dance Monkey", and was followed by Dean Lewis, who performed "Be Alright" and "Waves". John Williamson also performed Waltzing Matilda.

Paul Kelly performed "Leaps and Bounds" and "Dumb Things". Mike Brady also performed "Up There Cazaly".

Conrad Sewell performed the Australian National Anthem "Advance Australia Fair".

Richmond chose Maureen Hafey – the widow of legendary Richmond coach Tom Hafey – as their ambassador to carry the premiership cup onto the field, while GWS chose Kevin Sheedy – their first-ever coach. Hafey also presented the trophy to Trent Cotchin and Damien Hardwick during the on-field award ceremony.

== Match summary ==
=== First quarter ===
The opening term of the grand final was a tough and low-scoring battle, with neither team scoring a goal in the first twenty minutes of the match. Giants spearhead Jeremy Cameron scored the opening goal of the grand final at the 20-minute mark before two late goals—from Dustin Martin at the 24-minute mark and Daniel Rioli right on the quarter-time siren—saw the Tigers take a seven-point lead at quarter time.

=== Second quarter ===
Richmond was the stronger team in the second quarter. They scored five unanswered goals in a dominant quarter; Jack Riewoldt goaled at the four-minute mark of the term, followed by Martin's second goal at the seven-and-a-half minute mark. Tom Lynch scored two minutes later before Riewoldt finished the half with another two goals. Greater Western Sydney was held to just four behinds in the second quarter, and Richmond held a 35-point lead at half time.

=== Third quarter ===
Richmond sealed the premiership with a dominant third quarter in which it scored five goals to one. Lynch kicked his second goal at the five-minute mark before Martin kicked his third in the eighth minute. Marlion Pickett scored his only goal of the afternoon at the 11th minute, and Kane Lambert scored two minutes after. The Giants finally broke a run of 11 consecutive Richmond goals with a Jacob Hopper goal at the 25-minute mark of the quarter, before Ivan Soldo goaled right on the three-quarter-time siren. The margin was 62 points in favour of the Tigers at three quarter time, and the premiership was now beyond doubt.

=== Fourth quarter ===
In the final quarter, Richmond again scored five goals and conceded only one. The Giants scored their third and final goal of the game early in the final quarter by Harry Himmelberg second minute. Shai Bolton scored his first goal of the day for Richmond at the ninth minute, followed by Riewoldt's fourth goal. Richmond skipper Trent Cotchin goaled at the 23-minute mark and was followed soon after by Martin, who also scored his fourth goal. Riewoldt kicked the final goal only moments before the siren to increase the final margin to 89 points, the third-highest margin in a grand final. It was Richmond's greatest winning margin in a grand final, surpassing its 81-point victory against Collingwood in 1980.

=== Norm Smith Medal ===
By unanimous selection – 15 out of 15 possible votes – Dustin Martin was awarded his second Norm Smith Medal after having won it in 2017, making him the fourth player to win multiple Norm Smith Medals after Gary Ayres, Andrew McLeod and Luke Hodge. No other player garnered more than 6 votes, but Bachar Houli finished second as he did in 2017. Chaired by Alastair Lynch, the voters and their choices were as follows:

Norm Smith Medal voting tally
Position	Player	Club	Total votes	Vote summary
1 (winner)	Dustin Martin	Richmond	15	3,3,3,3,3
2	Bachar Houli	Richmond	6	2,2,2
3	Marlion Pickett	Richmond	4	2,1,1
4	Jack Riewoldt	Richmond	3	1,1,1
5	Dion Prestia	Richmond	2	2

Voter	Role	3 Votes	2 Votes	1 Vote
Alastair Lynch	Fox Footy	Dustin Martin	Bachar Houli	Jack Riewoldt
Chris Johnson	NIRS	Dustin Martin	Dion Prestia	Jack Riewoldt
Bruce McAvaney	Channel 7	Dustin Martin	Bachar Houli	Marlion Pickett
Matthew Lloyd	3AW	Dustin Martin	Bachar Houli	Marlion Pickett
Angela Pippos	ABC	Dustin Martin	Marlion Pickett	Jack Riewoldt

== Teams ==
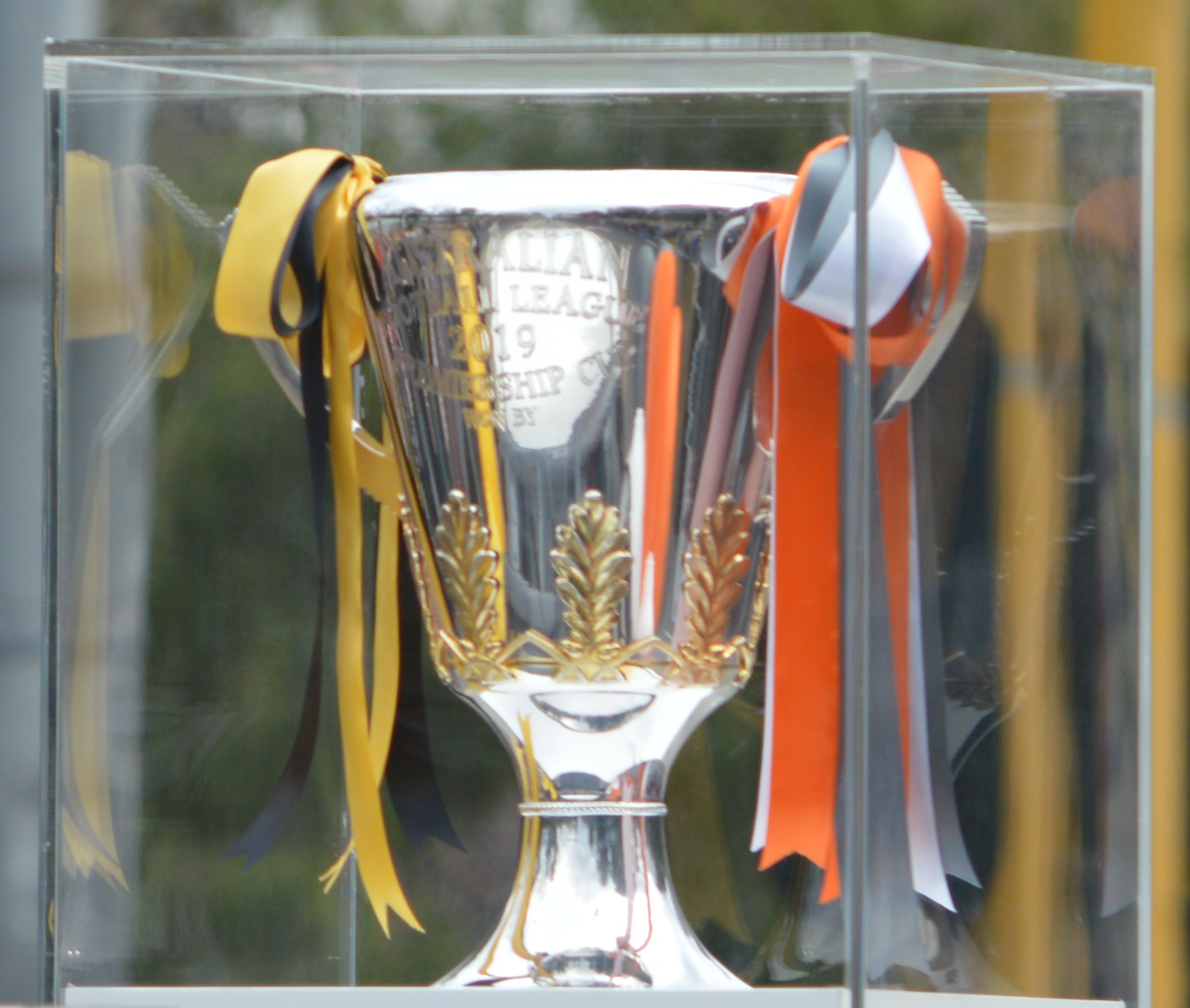
The 2019 AFL Premiership Cup on display at the 2019 AFL Grand Final Parade

The teams were announced on 26 September 2019. Richmond made one change to the side, with Jack Graham dropping out of the side due to a shoulder injury he suffered in the preliminary final. Marlion Pickett, who had never previously played a senior AFL game, took his spot; having previously been picked up from South Fremantle in the WAFL during the midseason draft following the retirement of 2017 premiership player Shaun Grigg, Pickett had won the Norm Goss Medal in the Richmond reserves' VFL grand final victory over Williamstown the previous week. He was the first player to make his senior debut in a grand final since Keith Batchelor for Collingwood in 1952.

Richmond fielded sixteen of the twenty-two players who had been part of its premiership team in 2017: Pickett, Tom Lynch, Shai Bolton, Ivan Soldo, Jayden Short and Liam Baker were the new players, and Rance, Grigg, Graham, Jacob Townsend, Dan Butler and Kamdyn McIntosh were the six missing.

Greater Western Sydney recalled Toby Greene and Lachie Whitfield, who missed their preliminary final win due to suspension and injury respectively, into their side, with Lachlan Keeffe and Ian Hill omitted to make way. GWS also was missing former Richmond rising star Brett Deledio, after he had been injured earlier in the finals.

Richmond	GWS Giants

Richmond
B:	12 David Astbury	35 Nathan Broad	2 Dylan Grimes
HB:	14 Bachar Houli	1 Nick Vlastuin	15 Jayden Short
C:	5 Brandon Ellis	3 Dion Prestia	22 Josh Caddy
HF:	17 Daniel Rioli	9 Trent Cotchin (c)	23 Kane Lambert
F:	11 Jason Castagna	19 Tom Lynch	8 Jack Riewoldt
Foll:	25 Toby Nankervis	10 Shane Edwards	4 Dustin Martin
Int:	29 Shai Bolton	47 Ivan Soldo	48 Liam Baker
Int:	50 Marlion Pickett		
Coach:	Damien Hardwick		

Greater Western Sydney
B:	19 Nick Haynes	1 Phil Davis (c)	35 Aidan Corr
HB:	2 Jacob Hopper	15 Sam Taylor	23 Heath Shaw
C:	29 Zac Williams	22 Josh Kelly	6 Lachie Whitfield
HF:	50 Sam Reid	18 Jeremy Cameron	4 Toby Greene
F:	27 Harry Himmelberg	31 Jeremy Finlayson	16 Brent Daniels
Foll:	41 Shane Mumford	14 Tim Taranto	24 Matt de Boer
Int:	20 Adam Tomlinson	36 Harry Perryman	38 Daniel Lloyd
Int:	40 Adam Kennedy		
Coach:	Leon Cameron		

Umpires

The umpiring panel, comprising three field umpires, four boundary umpires, two goal umpires and an emergency in each position is given below.

2019 AFL Grand Final umpires
Position					Emergency
Field:	9 Matt Stevic (7)	18 Ray Chamberlain (3)	25 Shaun Ryan (8)		21 Simon Meredith
Boundary:	Matthew Tomkins (3)	Chris Gordon (4)	Ian Burrows (8)	Matthew Konetschka (2)	Joshua Mather
Goal:	Steven Piperno (2)	Michael Craig (1)			Angus McKenzie-Wills

Numbers in brackets represent the number of grand finals umpired, including 2019.

== Scoreboard ==
Grand Final
Saturday, 28 September (2:30 pm)	Richmond	def.	Greater Western Sydney	Melbourne Cricket Ground (crowd: 100,014)	Report
2.3 (15); 7.5 (47); 12.9 (81); 17.12 (114)	Q1; Q2; Q3; Final	1.2 (8); 1.6 (12); 2.7 (19); 3.7 (25)	Umpires: Stevic, Chamberlain, Ryan; Norm Smith Medal: Dustin Martin; Television broadcast: Seven Network; National anthem: Conrad Sewell
5: Riewoldt; 4: Martin; 2: Lynch; 1: Rioli, Pickett, Lambert, Soldo, Bolton, Cotchin	Goals	1: Cameron, Hopper, Himmelberg
Martin, Riewoldt, Prestia, Pickett, Edwards, Vlastuin, Houli	Best	Taranto, Shaw, Haynes, Hopper, Williams
Nil	Injuries	Nil
Nil	Reports	Nil
Richmond won its 12th premiership.; Dustin Martin became the fourth VFL/AFL player in history to win multiple Norm Smith Medals after Gary Ayres (Hawthorn 1986 and 1988), Andrew McLeod (Adelaide 1997 and 1998) and Luke Hodge (Hawthorn 2008 and 2014).; Marlion Pickett was the first player to make his senior debut in a VFL or AFL grand final since Keith Batchelor (Collingwood 1952).; Trent Cotchin equalled Dan Minogue (1920 and 1921), Percy Bentley (1932 and 1934) and Royce Hart (1973 and 1974) for the most premierships won as Richmond captain.; Damien Hardwick became Richmond's first multiple premiership coach since Tom Hafey (1967, 1969, 1973 and 1974).; This was Richmond's greatest winning margin in a grand final, surpassing its 81-point win against Collingwood in 1980.; Greater Western Sydney’s score of 3.7 (25) was the lowest in a grand final since Collingwood’s score of 2.2 (14) in 1960 against Melbourne. It was the club’s lowest score in any game, a record it still holds as of 2025.

== Media coverage ==
=== Radio coverage ===
Station	Region	Play-by-play commentators	Analysts	Boundary riders
Triple M	National	James Brayshaw, Luke Darcy	Chris Judd, Nathan Brown, Ash Chua (statistician)	Michael Roberts, Dr. Rohan White
ABC Radio	National	Alister Nicholson, Clint Wheeldon	Brad Sewell, Mark Maclure	Kelli Underwood
AFL Nation	National	Peter Donegan, Stephen Quartermain	Terry Wallace, Nick Dal Santo	Jo Wotton
3AW 6PR	Melbourne, VIC Perth, WA	Tim Lane, Tony Leonard	Leigh Matthews, Matthew Lloyd, Jimmy Bartel	Jacqui Reed
SEN	Melbourne, VIC	Anthony Hudson, Gerard Whateley	Garry Lyon, Kane Cornes	Mitch Cleary
K Rock	Geelong, VIC	Tom King, Darren Berry	Shaun Higgins, Leigh Brown	Heath Buck
