= Ivan Soldo =

Australian rules footballer (born 1996)

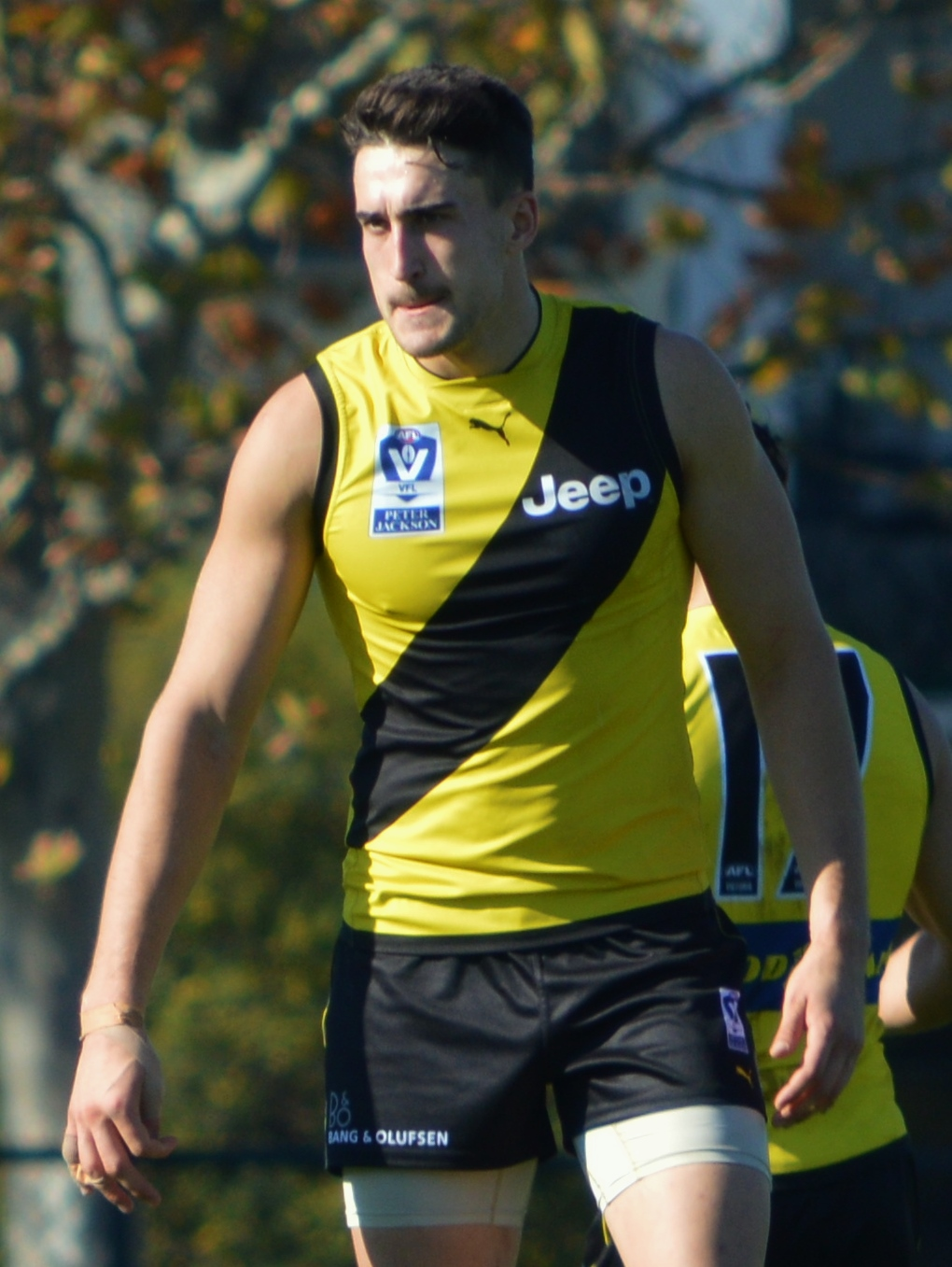
- Soldo with Richmond's VFL team in May 2018

Personal information
- Full name: Ivan Soldo
- Born: 14 April 1996 (age 30)
- Original team: Northern Knights (TAC Cup)
- Draft: No. 68, 2015 Rookie Draft: Richmond
- Debut: Round 7, 2017, Richmond vs. Western Bulldogs, at Etihad Stadium
- Height: 204 cm (6 ft 8 in)
- Weight: 106 kg (234 lb)
- Position: Ruck

Playing career
Years	Club	Games (Goals)
2015–2023	Richmond	57 (23)
2024–2026	Port Adelaide	9 (5)
Total		66 (28)

Career highlights
- AFL premiership player: 2019

Ivan Soldo (born 14 April 1996) is a former professional Australian rules footballer who last played for the Port Adelaide Football Club in the Australian Football League (AFL). He also played for the Richmond Football Club. He is the cousin of former Richmond ruck Ivan Maric. Soldo set the AFL record for most hit-outs in a debut game during his first match in 2017. In 2019 he became an AFL premiership player with Richmond.

== Early life ==
Soldo grew up in the Australian capital city of Canberra. He attended Daramalan College and completed his studies in 2013. A promising junior basketballer, Soldo represented the ACT in national tournaments at the under-16 and under-18 levels. To July 2014 he had never played Australian rules football at a club level, only learning to kick in a social context.

== AFL career ==
=== Richmond (2015–2023) ===
After a trial with Richmond in May 2014, he was signed as a category-B rookie in July. Soldo was introduced to club officials the previous Christmas as a future prospect by cousin and Richmond ruck Ivan Maric. As part of the category-B arrangements under which he was signed, Soldo was allowed to train and play with TAC Cup side the Northern Knights before joining Richmond's 2015 pre-season training. Soldo played his first Australian rules football match in late July 2014, with the Northern Knights and against the Gippsland Power in Morwell. He was officially drafted in December with the club's fifth selection and the 68th selection overall in the 2015 Rookie Draft.

==== 2015–2016 seasons ====
He did not play a match at senior level in his first two years at the club, instead learning his craft with Richmond's reserves side in the VFL. He played eight games at VFL level in 2015 before playing 15 (and averaging 19.9 hit-outs) in the 2016 season.

==== 2017 season ====
Soldo was elevated to the Richmond senior list in May 2017, a potential replacement for suspended ruck Toby Nankervis. He made his AFL debut in Round 7 2017, in a match against the reigning premier Western Bulldogs at Etihad Stadium He recorded nine disposals and three marks in the match, along with setting a league record for debutants with 42 hitouts. He was omitted from the senior side the following week but returned in Round 9 to play the GWS Giants in Sydney. Playing as a back-up ruck to Nankervis, he managed just six hit-outs and five disposals before again being dropped from the team the following week. After six weeks of playing at reserves level Soldo was recalled to the AFL side to play Brisbane in Round 17. He played as the club's lead ruck, with the more mobile Nankervis moved into the role of centre half forward. Soldo kicked his first career goal in round 20 against Hawthorn at the MCG. Following five straight matches at senior level he was again dropped from the side ahead of round 22's match-up with Fremantle. He did not return to senior football that season, instead closing out his year with the VFL side on their push towards the league's grand final. However, he became just one of three players at the club not to play in a grand final at either level in 2017, after he was dropped from the reserves side due to a glut of available rucks. He finished the year having played seven AFL matches in 2017.

==== 2018 season ====
Soldo was upgraded to Richmond's senior player list ahead of the 2018 season. He started that year as he had done the previous three, playing with Richmond's reserves side in the VFL. In early May assistant coach Xavier Clarke said Soldo was "starting to become a really dominant ruckman" at VFL level after a game in which he recorded 38 hitouts, 10 disposals and five inside 50s. He was named as an AFL emergency on a league-leading 12 occasions over the first 15 weeks of the season, including in rounds 8 and 9 when the club's leading ruck Toby Nankervis was dealing with a minor wrist injury and considered in some doubt to play. On both occasions Nankervis was ultimately fit to play however and Soldo reached the mid-point of the season without having played a match at AFL level. In mid-June he began dealing with an infected toe and later a concussion that when combined would see him miss more than a month of football. Soldo returned to reserves-level football in mid-July and by early August would earn his first AFL match of the season when Nankervis sustained a corked quad muscle ahead of round 21's match against the Gold Coast. He recorded a match-high 34 hitouts and earned the praise of senior coach Damien Hardwick for his performance in that match, but was ultimately omitted from the side upon Nankvervis' return the following week. In September he played with the club's reserves side in the VFL finals series. Despite finishing the season as minor premiers, consecutive losses to Williamstown and Essendon would see the VFL side eliminated early in the finals series and bring Soldo's season to an end. Soldo finished 2018 having played just the one AFL match, along with 16 games at reserves level in the VFL.

==== 2019 season ====
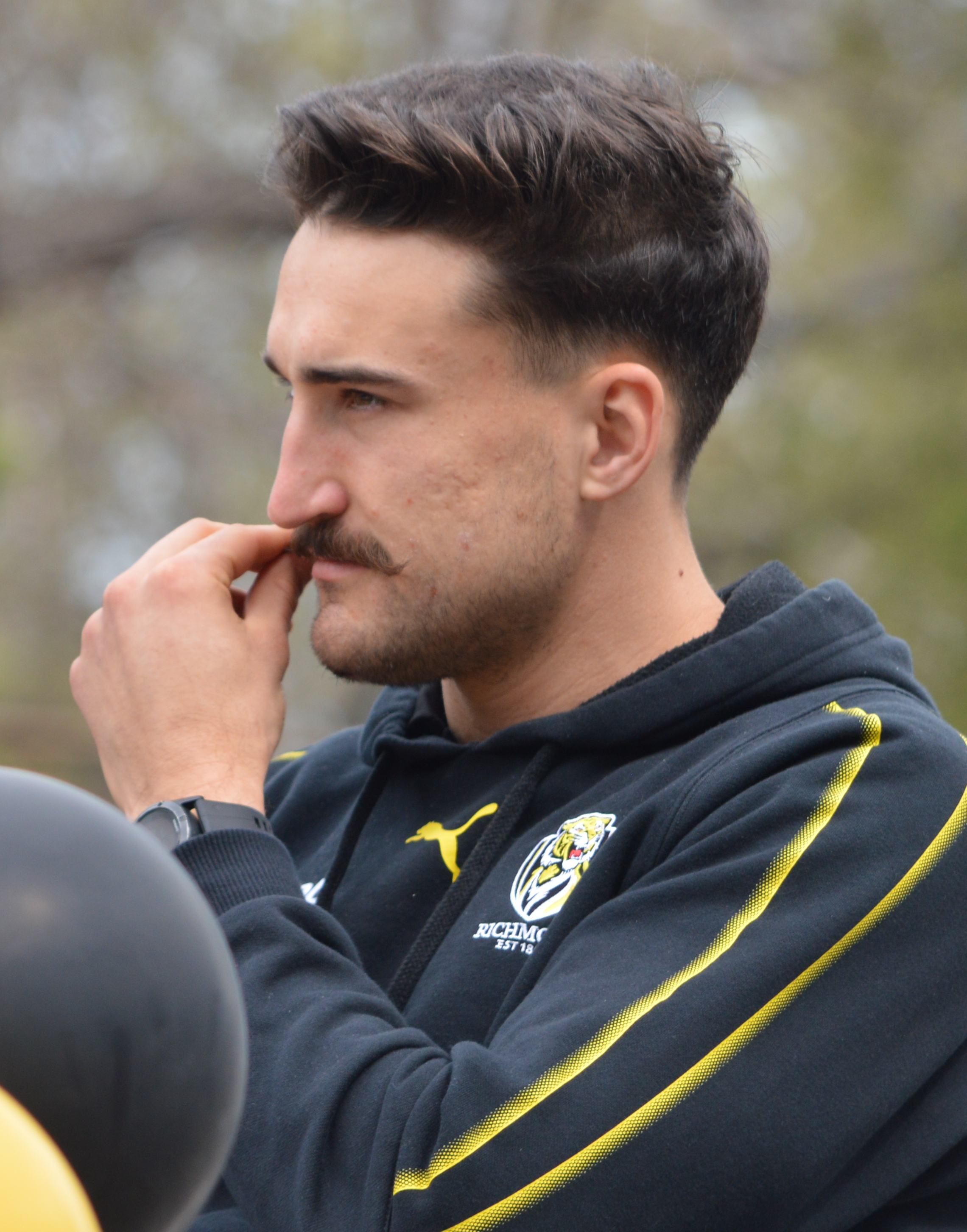
Soldo during the 2019 AFL grand final parade

Soldo spent the 2018/19 off-season preparing for the possibility of playing AFL football alongside Richmond's lead ruck Toby Nankervis. This came as a result of a serious injury to midfielder and relief ruck Shaun Grigg, as well as newly introduced league ruck rules that meant even upon a possible return, Grigg would be unlikely to play as ruck support to Nankervis. Soldo took the role as number one ruck in the first of two pre-season games, while Nankervis played in the same team but primarily as a forward. In the final pre-season match Soldo played a reduced role, relegated to third-string ruck behind Nankervis and the yet-to-debut tall utility Noah Balta. He was ultimately unable to gain AFL selection in round 1, with numerous media outlets attributing this largely to his poor positional versatility. Instead, Soldo was named AFL emergency for the opening matches of the season while playing VFL football where he was regularly impressive. In late April he was particularly noteworthy, recording 43 hitouts, 14 disposals and eight clearances in a VFL win over Casey. An injury to Nankervis in mid-May saw him likely to miss six-to-eight weeks of football and saw Soldo called in for his first AFL match of the season, a round 9 win over Hawthorn in which he managed 35 hitouts. He attracted the attention of the AFL's Match Review Officer in that match however, offered a one match suspension for strike on midfielder James Worpel which was graded intentional conduct with low impact to the head. Soldo challenged the finding at the AFL Tribunal but the ban was upheld, with Soldo subsequently missing the club's match against Essendon. Soldo was immediately recalled to AFL action in round 11, where he set a new career-best with seven tackles. He repeated that mark the following week, this time along with an equal career-best four clearances. Hours before round 13's Thursday night match up against Adelaide, Soldo was ruled out with illness. He made an immediate return to AFL level following that match and the club's mid-season bye. Soldo held his spot at senior level while Nankervis returned to football with three weeks on limited minutes in the VFL, with Soldo kicking four goals in the five matches up to and including round 20's win over Melbourne. Soldo was dropped back to VFL level the following week, with Nankervis elevated in his place. He would remain at the level for just one match however, recalled to replace Nankervis who was withdrawn from the round 22 clash with groin soreness. Soldo posted a season-best 40 hitouts and career-best six clearances in that match before setting new career-bests with 14 disposals, five marks and six score involvements in the final match of the season. So impressive were his performances over that span, Soldo held his spot for the club's qualifying final against the Brisbane Lions despite Nankervis' return to the team. In his first time sharing ruck duties with Nankervis that season, Soldo bested his partner with 25 hitouts and seven disposals as Richmond won through to a home preliminary final against Geelong. He was again influential in that match with 23 hitouts and 10 disposals in another Richmond win. In the grand final, Soldo had 20 hitouts, seven disposals and kicked a goal as Richmond defeated Greater Western Sydney by 89 points. He finished the season having played 14 matches and winning an AFL premiership in just his 22nd career AFL match.

==== 2020 season ====
During the 2019/20 off-season, Soldo received a Richmond life membership for his role in the club's 2019 premiership and adopted the number 20 guernsey last worn by his cousin and ruck mentor Ivan Maric. An ongoing injury rehab affecting Toby Nankervis ensured Soldo maintained the lead ruck role through two pre-season matches in March, but strong form in those matches meant he would retain the role when Nankervis returned for round 1 of the season proper. He recorded 25 hitouts and five clearances in the win 1 win over Carlton which was played extraordinary conditions imposed on the league as a result of the rapid progression of the coronavirus pandemic into Australia. In what the league planned would be the first of a reduced 17-round season, the match was played without crowds in attendance due to public health prohibitions on large gatherings and with quarter lengths reduced by one fifth in order to reduce the physical load on players who would be expected to play multiple matches with short breaks in the second half of the year. Just three days later, the AFL Commission suspended the season for an indefinite period after multiple states enforced quarantine conditions on their borders that effectively ruled out the possibility of continuing the season as planned. Soldo played as the sole Richmond ruck when the season resumed after an 11-week hiatus, notching 23 hitouts in an early-June draw with Collingwood after beating out Nankervis for selection to the round 2 team. After one more appearance at AFL level, Soldo would spend a two-week stint at reserves level, playing in unofficial practice matches against St Kilda and Melbourne reserves sides due to AFL clubs' withdrawal from the VFL season. After the entire club was relocated to the Gold Coast in response to a virus outbreak in Melbourne in June, Soldo was recalled to replace an injured Nankervis in the club's round 6 win over Sydney. He held down that role over a further six matches including on a minor rolled ankle in rounds 10 and 11, before putting in a starring performance in the club's round 13 Dreamtime in Darwin win over Essendon. Soldo set new career highs in disposals (17) and intercepts (nine) in that match, while another 19 hit outs saw him ranked seventh in the league for total hitouts that year. He went on to share ruck duties with his teammate when Nankervis returned from injury the following week, and both held their spots into the club's round 17 match-up with Geelong. In the first half of that match, Soldo suffered a serious knee injury during a collision with other players in a marking contest. Scans conducted the following day revealed ruptures to both the anterior cruciate ligament and medial ligament of his left knee. The injury would require extensive surgery to repair, with a return to football expected to take at least 12 months. Though Richmond would push on into the AFL finals series, the injury ended Soldo's 2020 season after 14 matches.

==== 2021 season ====
Soldo missed the entirety of the 2021 season as he rehabilitated a serious knee injury from 2020.

=== Port Adelaide (2024–) ===
At the conclusion of the 2023 season, Soldo was traded to Port Adelaide in exchange for a package including a future second round draft pick.

During the 2026 preseason, Soldo ruptured his ACL and was ruled out for the 2026 AFL season.

== Playing style ==
Soldo plays in the ruck, and is especially notable as a tap ruckman with a special ability for winning hitouts. He is less developed at groundball aspects of the role.

== Statistics ==
Legend
G	Goals	K	Kicks	D	Disposals	T	Tackles
B	Behinds	H	Handballs	M	Marks	H/O	Hit-outs

Season	Team	No.	Games	Totals								Averages (per game)								Votes
Season	Team	No.	Games	G	B	K	H	D	M	T	H/O	G	B	K	H	D	M	T	H/O	Votes
2015		47	0	—	—	—	—	—	—	—	—	—	—	—	—	—	—	—	—	0
2016		47	0	—	—	—	—	—	—	—	—	—	—	—	—	—	—	—	—	0
2017	Richmond	47	7	1	0	21	22	43	12	22	148	0.1	0.0	3.0	3.1	6.1	1.7	3.1	21.1	0
2018	Richmond	47	1	0	0	2	9	11	0	3	34	0.0	0.0	2.0	9.0	11.0	0.0	3.0	34.0	0
2019^{#}	Richmond	47	14	6	2	68	60	128	33	55	359	0.4	0.1	4.9	4.3	9.1	2.4	3.9	25.6	0
2020 (Note: The 2020 season was played with 17 home-and-away matches per team (down from 22) and 16-minute quarters with time on (down from 20-minute quarters with time on) due to the impact of the COVID-19 pandemic.)	Richmond	20	14	2	3	52	56	108	23	38	294	0.1	0.2	3.7	4.0	7.7	1.6	2.7	21.0	0
2021		20	0	—	—	—	—	—	—	—	—	—	—	—	—	—	—	—	—	0
2022	Richmond	20	13	7	3	60	35	95	32	24	185	0.5	0.2	4.6	2.7	7.3	2.5	1.8	14.2	0
2023	Richmond	20	8	7	5	47	31	78	31	30	182	0.9	0.6	5.9	3.9	9.8	3.9	3.8	22.8	0
2024	Port Adelaide	13	8	5	4	51	33	84	18	22	224	0.6	0.5	6.4	4.1	10.5	2.3	2.8	28.0	0
2025	Port Adelaide	13	1	0	0	3	2	5	1	1	9	0.0	0.0	3.0	2.0	5.0	1.0	1.0	9.0	0
Career			66	28	17	304	248	552	150	195	1435	0.4	0.3	4.6	3.8	8.4	2.3	3.0	21.7	0

== Honours and achievements ==
Team

- AFL premiership player (Richmond): 2019
- McClelland Trophy (Richmond): 2018
