= Marlion Pickett =

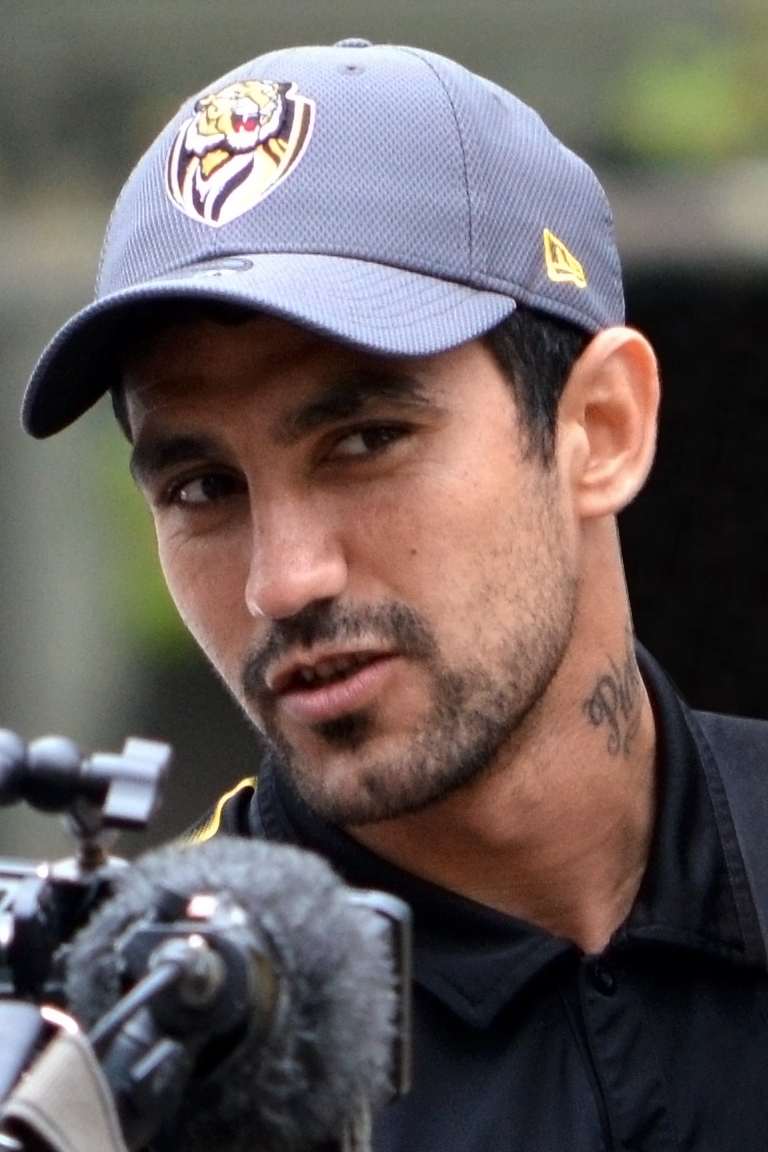
- Pickett in the 2019 AFL Grand Final Parade

Personal information
- Born: 6 January 1992 (age 34); Perth, Western Australia
- Original team: South Fremantle (WAFL)
- Draft: No. 13, 2019 mid-season rookie draft
- Debut: Grand Final, 2019, Richmond vs. Greater Western Sydney, at MCG
- Height: 184 cm (6 ft 0 in)
- Weight: 84 kg (185 lb)
- Position: Midfielder / half-back

Playing career
Years	Club	Games (Goals)
2019–2024	Richmond	91 (27)

Career highlights
- AFL: 2× AFL premiership player: 2019, 2020; State league: VFL premiership player: 2019; Norm Goss Medal: 2019; South Fremantle best and fairest: 2018; WAFL Team of the Year: 2018

Marlion Pickett (born 6 January 1992) is a former professional Australian rules footballer who played for the Richmond Football Club in the Australian Football League (AFL). At age 27 and after a six-and-a-half-season career with South Fremantle in the West Australian Football League which included a club best and fairest award, Pickett was drafted by Richmond with the 13th selection in the 2019 mid-season rookie draft.

He won the Norm Goss Memorial Medal as best on ground during Richmond's reserves side's premiership in 2019 before making his debut in a victorious AFL grand final the following week. Pickett was the first player to debut in a VFL/AFL grand final in 67 years, and he was the first to win a premiership in his debut game since 1926. He became a two-time premiership winner with Richmond's grand final victory in 2020, earning the second honour in just his 20th game at AFL level.

Picket is currently playing for the Tiwi Island Bombers in the Northern Territory Football League, helping the Bombers make a dramatic rise towards the finals, having been easybeats for several years.

== Early life ==
Pickett was born in Perth in January 1992 to parents Thomas Pickett and Angela Smith. The third of seven children, Pickett spent his early childhood in the northern suburbs of Perth. Pickett is of Noongar Aboriginal Australian ancestry. He was raised in difficult circumstances, witnessing family violence and drug and alcohol abuse within his immediate and extended family, while experiencing food insecurity due to his parents being out of work and supported entirely by welfare.

Pickett first played football at age seven, playing alongside his older brother in the under 9s division at the Puma Panthers in Balga. At age 11, Pickett's family relocated to the south-west regional Western Australian town of Manjimup, where he played junior football for the Manjimup Tigers, including in a Colts premiership for the side at 14 years of age.

He returned to Perth at age 15 in 2007, settling in Eden Hill in the city's north. While there, he played football with the Nollamara Junior Football Club and senior amateur Indigenous club, Koongamia. He experienced racial abuse at the hands of teammates while at Nollamara and sat out a junior grand final in protest of his club's failure to act on the issue, before departing the club entirely.

Later in 2007, Pickett was involved in a brawl alongside family members in the northern suburb of Bassendean and was subsequently charged with committing grievous bodily harm. While on bail for that charge, Pickett was arrested for engaging in a brawl and charged with both robbery and assault. He was convicted for both the grievously bodily harm and robbery charges and served a six month juvenile detention sentence at Rangeview Remand Centre in Murdoch.

Pickett left school at age 16. Soon after his release from juvenile detention he moved away from his parents and into his partners' family home in Hamilton Hill. He resumed football with Koongamia, but was unable to find work, instead being charged with more criminal offences including driving without a licence and burglary. As a bail condition for failing to appear in court for the latter charge, Pickett resumed living with his parents, who had relocated east of Perth to the town of York. At age 17, he played seniors for the York Roos in the Avon Football Association. Later that year he was charged with assault and reckless driving that year for his part in a public fight between feuding families, though those charges were later dropped.

Picket moved homes more than a dozen times over the next year, still unable to find work, before becoming an ice user and dealer not long after his 18th birthday. He began burgling local cars to fund the habit. He and a group of friends conducted two major early-morning burglaries by smashing into local shopping centres with sledgehammers on back-to-back weekends. Pickett was charged and found guilty of 17 counts of burglary and one count of aggravated burglary. He was sentenced to one month imprisonment for each count of burglary, each served concurrently, and 18 months for the aggravatedly burglary, for a total of two and half years imprisonment.

Pickett served the first portion of his sentence at Acacia Prison in Wooroloo, where he suffered from serious mental health episodes and attempted suicide on four occasions. After being transferred to the lower security Wooroloo Prison Farm, Pickett was the star member of the prison's travelling amateur football team, a program covered by the ABC's 2014 documentary television series, Outside Chance. He struggled with the un-structured environment of the prison farm, staging a drugs infraction to force a move to the main prison campus for the remainder of his sentence.

After over four years in the AFL having overcoming his indiscretions, Pickett was again remanded by West-Australian authorities on 11 June 2023, a day after a game played against Fremantle in Perth. Pickett was charged with four counts of aggravated burglary, three counts of stealing and three counts of criminal damage. The alleged offences took place between December 2022 and January 2023.

== State league football ==
Pickett was released from jail at age 21 in June 2013, after serving the full 30 months of his sentence. He immediately took up an offer to train with West Australian Football League (WAFL) club South Fremantle at the insistence of his elder brother Tommy, who had been a reserves player there in 2012. He was signed to the club's list almost immediately and played his first reserves grade game in late June 2013, two weeks after his release, where he recorded 15 disposals and two goals. Within two months he was called up for a senior WAFL debut, kicking three goals and recording nine marks, 26 disposals and eight inside 50s in a late-August match against East Perth. Pickett spent the remainder of the season playing on the wing and at half-forward and was a member of the club's reserves-grade premiership victory that season after the senior side failed to qualify for finals.

Pickett was a senior player by round 1, 2014, but finished the year in the reserves side after a form slump in the middle of the year cause by opposition tagging and a later positional shift to the forward line. In 2015, he was moved to the half back line and was rewarded with selection in the WAFL/Western Australia representative team and also finished third in South Fremantle's best and fairest award. During that season, Pickett was charged with grievous bodily harm after engaging in a fight with a racially abusive attendee at a friends party, though those charges were later dropped just before they were due to be heard in November 2016. On-field in 2016, he was again selected in the state team and finished second in South Fremantle's best and fairest count.

Pickett played in all but two matches in South Fremantle's 2017 home and away season, before contributing to the clubs preliminary finals run. In 2018, he moved into a midfield role following the departure of recently AFL-drafted teammate Tim Kelly. He was regularly named by The West Australian as among South Fremantle's best players in matches that year and finished the season having won the club's best and fairest award and being named to the WAFL Team of the Year while averaging 21.8 disposals per game. He contributed a stand-out performance in that season's finals series, recording four goals and 26 disposals in a qualifying final against West Perth and 25 disposals and two goals in a semi-final against Subiaco.

Following the 2018 WAFL season, Pickett attracted the recruiting attention of AFL clubs including Gold Coast, Geelong and West Coast and was projected by ESPN to be taken by St Kilda with the 62nd pick in the forthcoming national draft. As part of that interest, he was interviewed extensively by Gold Coast and was flown out to tour the club's facilities and meet head coach Stuart Dew in person. Pickett was ultimately passed over by all AFL clubs in both the national and rookie drafts that year.

He was tough around the ball, but in space he would glide across the ground. Then in the air he had a terrific vertical leap, and he was brave.

— Will Thursfield, Richmond scout, on Pickett's WAFL skill set

Prior to the start of the 2019 WAFL season, Pickett was labelled the competition's fourth best player by The West Australian. He failed to play a match in the early part of the season however, after suffering a broken finger in a practice match one week before round 1. In May 2019 while rehabilitating the injury, Pickett met with Essendon and Richmond recruiters and underwent an AFL medical screening prior to the upcoming mid-season draft.

He made a return to play that same month, but suffered a re-break of the same finger in his second game back and just days before the mid-season draft. Pickett underwent emergency surgery on the night of the injury, with Essendon telling his management they were no longer interested in drafting him mid-season.

He had played 98 games and kicked 37 goals for South Fremantle over six and a half seasons in the WAFL.

== AFL career ==
=== 2019 season ===
Pickett was drafted by Richmond with the club's first selection and 13th pick overall in the 2019 mid-season rookie draft in late May 2019 after the retirement of Shaun Grigg, one of the Tigers' 2017 premiership players and the one who ultimately presented Pickett with his first match guernsey for the Grand Final, opened a spot on their list.

Pickett participated in aerobic conditioning work throughout the first three weeks of his injury rehabilitation, joining the club's rehab group under the guidance of injured captain Trent Cotchin. He began full contact training in the last week of July and made a reserves-grade debut for Richmond's VFL side in the first weekend of August, kicking one goal and recording 20 disposals. Pickett was named an AFL-level emergency in each of the following two weeks, but ultimately played each week in the reserves in a dual role as a midfielder and half-back. He remained with the reserves into their VFL finals campaign, kicking two goals and recording 21 disposals in a qualifying final win over Essendon. Pickett was named as an AFL emergency the following week for the qualifying final against Brisbane, before contributing 16 disposals and seven tackles in a VFL preliminary final win over Port Melbourne.

He again missed out on AFL selection in the club's top-league preliminary final against Geelong a week later, but did play in the VFL grand final that same weekend against Williamstown. In what earned the club its first reserves premiership since 1997, Pickett recorded 19 disposals, nine tackles and a goal in a best-on-ground performance that saw him awarded the Norm Goss Memorial Medal.

==== 2019 AFL Grand Final ====
Marlion's having a shot at goal and the murmur that is going around...this is like a fairy tale. This couldn't happen, could it? We couldn't have a kid that's been in jail, 27 years of age, playing his first game in front of 100,000 – he could not possibly kick a goal. It's an incredible story. Hard to believe it happened, really.

— Richmond coach Damien Hardwick speaking to Australian Story about Pickett's goal on debut in the 2019 AFL Grand Final

In the week that followed, Pickett burst into AFL selection consideration as a potential replacement for injured midfielder Jack Graham, the leading goal kicker in the 2017 Grand Final. When Graham was officially ruled out, Pickett was called up to make his debut in the 2019 AFL Grand Final against Greater Western Sydney, becoming just the sixth player and the first since Keith Batchelor for Collingwood in 1952 to make his first-team debut in a VFL or AFL Grand Final. When he helped to his side to a 89-point victory in that Grand Final, Pickett also became the first player to win a premiership in his debut game since Francis Vine with Melbourne in 1926.

He was among the best players on the ground in the win, finishing third in the Norm Smith Medal voting with four votes (two from Angela Pippos and one each from Bruce McAvaney and Matthew Lloyd) behind teammates Bachar Houli and unanimous winner Dustin Martin, after a performance which included 22 disposals and his debut AFL goal off a set shot with 12 minutes played in the third quarter. Pickett's season at Richmond concluded after one AFL match and six in the VFL, with premierships at both the top-flight and reserves-grade levels.

Pickett was also later profiled in Australian Story following the Grand Final. He also revealed that his pointing to the sky after his maiden goal in the Grand Final was dedicating the goal to loved ones who had died before his successful debut, saying, "I don’t really celebrate goals much...I pointed to the sky, that was for the hard times, and the family me and Jess have lost along the journey. The celebration was for them." Just over a month before the Grand Final, Pickett had flown back to Perth for the funeral of Sam Nannup – his friend and former cellmate and also the brother of his partner Jessica – who had died by suicide just a few weeks after his own release from prison and who had told Pickett that he would come to watch his first AFL game.

=== 2020 season ===
In the 2019/20 off-season, Pickett was awarded Richmond life membership for playing in the club's 2019 premiership-winning team. He completed a full load of pre-season training and maintained a place in the club's best 22 through each of its two pre-season series matches, before earning selection in the season-opening match against Carlton. Pickett recorded 14 disposals and an equal match-high five tackles in the win, played under extraordinary conditions imposed on the league as a result of the rapid progression of the coronavirus pandemic into Australia.

In what the league planned would be the first of a reduced 17-round season, the match was played without crowds in attendance due to public health prohibitions on large gatherings and with quarter lengths reduced by one fifth in order to reduce the physical load on players who would be expected to play multiple matches with short breaks in the second half of the year. Just three days later, the AFL Commission suspended the season for an indefinite period after multiple states enforced quarantine conditions on their borders that effectively ruled out the possibility of continuing the season as planned.

Pickett contributed just seven disposals in a round 2 draw with Collingwood when the season resumed in early-June following an 11-week hiatus. He was again subdued with 10 disposals in round 3, before being omitted from the club's round 4 side. Instead, he took part in an unofficial scratch match against St Kilda's reserves players due to the cancellation of the VFL season. He played one further reserves match the following week before the main playing group was relocated to the Gold Coast in response to a virus outbreak in Melbourne. Pickett earned an AFL recall in place of injured midfielder Dion Prestia in round 6, before an injury to Josh Caddy the following week allowed Pickett to cement a place of the wing in late July and early August, including with back-to-back 14 disposal and one goal games against the Western Bulldogs and Brisbane Lions in rounds 9 and 10 respectively.

Pickett posted then career-bests in marks (six), inside-50s (nine), metres gained (602) and uncontested possessions (15) in Richmond's round 13 Dreamtime in Darwin win over Essendon, before earning one Coaches Association Award vote in round 15 for a performance that included 19 disposals and four score involvements. Pickett turned in modest performances when the finals series began, adding 12 disposals in a first-up qualifying final loss to the Brisbane Lions.

He was praised by coach Damien Hardwick for his defensive efforts in a semi-final win over St Kilda a week later, before improving his offensive game with 13 deposals in a preliminary final against Port Adelaide in the third week of the finals. One week later, Pickett became a two-time AFL premiership player in just his 20th appearance, as Richmond defeated Geelong at the Gabba to claim a second successive premiership. He contributed 14 disposals in the win and was praised by AFL Media for his dedication to push back from the wing into defensive 50 to assist his teammates' defensive efforts. He finished the season having played 19 of a possible 21 games, placing 18th in the club's best and fairest count.

=== 2021–2024 ===
In October 2020, Pickett re-signed with Richmond on a two-year deal.

In the 2022 season, Pickett averaged a career-high 16 disposals. In August 2022, he re-signed with Richmond for the 2023 season.

In the 2023 season, Pickett played a career-high 21 games, including at times as an undersized key forward and ruck.

In the 2024 season, Pickett did not miss a game for the Tigers across the opening 12 matches before a calf injury against Geelong saw him spend time on the sidelines. After two VFL matches, Pickett returned for Richmond's final home-and-away game. In August 2024, Pickett announced his retirement from the AFL after six seasons with the Tigers. He finished with 91 career games.

== Player profile ==
Pickett plays as a wing and occasionally as an inside midfielder, but previously also played as a half-back during a long state-league career. In his debut game he played as an inside midfielder and half-forward, but Pickett has played as a dedicated winger since the beginning of the 2020 season. He has a combination skill set that makes him good at winning contested possessions inside stoppage contests but with the speed and poise for ball carrying in uncontested contests, as well as a strong vertical leap.

== Statistics ==
Legend
G	Goals	K	Kicks	D	Disposals	T	Tackles
B	Behinds	H	Handballs	M	Marks

Season	Team	No.	Games	Totals							Averages (per game)							Votes
Season	Team	No.	Games	G	B	K	H	D	M	T	G	B	K	H	D	M	T	Votes
2019^{#}	Richmond	50	1	1	0	13	9	22	2	1	1.0	0.0	13.0	9.0	22.0	2.0	1.0	0
2020^{#}	Richmond	50	19	4	4	119	113	232	43	67	0.2	0.2	6.3	5.9	12.2	2.3	3.5	0
2021	Richmond	50	18	2	4	119	163	282	63	62	0.1	0.2	6.6	9.1	15.7	3.5	3.4	0
2022	Richmond	50	19	8	5	180	125	305	87	55	0.4	0.3	9.5	6.6	16.1	4.6	2.9	2
2023	Richmond	50	21	8	4	130	142	272	54	55	0.4	0.2	6.2	6.8	13.0	2.6	2.6	0
2024	Richmond	50	13	4	9	94	94	188	48	34	0.3	0.7	7.2	7.2	14.5	3.7	2.6	0
Career			91	27	26	655	646	1301	297	274	0.3	0.3	7.2	7.1	14.3	3.3	3.0	2

== Honours and achievements ==
AFL

- 2× AFL premiership player: 2019, 2020
- Richmond Football Club life member 2020.

VFL

- VFL premiership player: 2019
- Norm Goss Memorial Medal: 2019

WAFL

- South Fremantle best & fairest: 2018
- Western Australia state-league game representative: 2015, 2016

== Personal life ==
Pickett is a Noongar Aboriginal Australian man.

His father is cousin to former North Melbourne, Port Adelaide and Melbourne player Byron Pickett.

Pickett was convicted of grievous bodily harm and spent time in youth detention as a 15 year old. He was imprisoned between 2010 and 2013 for multiple criminal offences including burglary. Though he was never charged, Pickett has admitted to being a regular ice user as a young adult, while working as a dealer over the same period.

He has four children with partner Jess Nannup, whom he met and began dating at age 16.

In June 2023, Pickett was arrested for multiple burglary cases that allegedly took place between December 2022 and January 2023. He appeared in Perth Magistrates Court on 12 June 2023 for a remand hearing.
