= Toby Nankervis =

Australian rules footballer (born 1994)

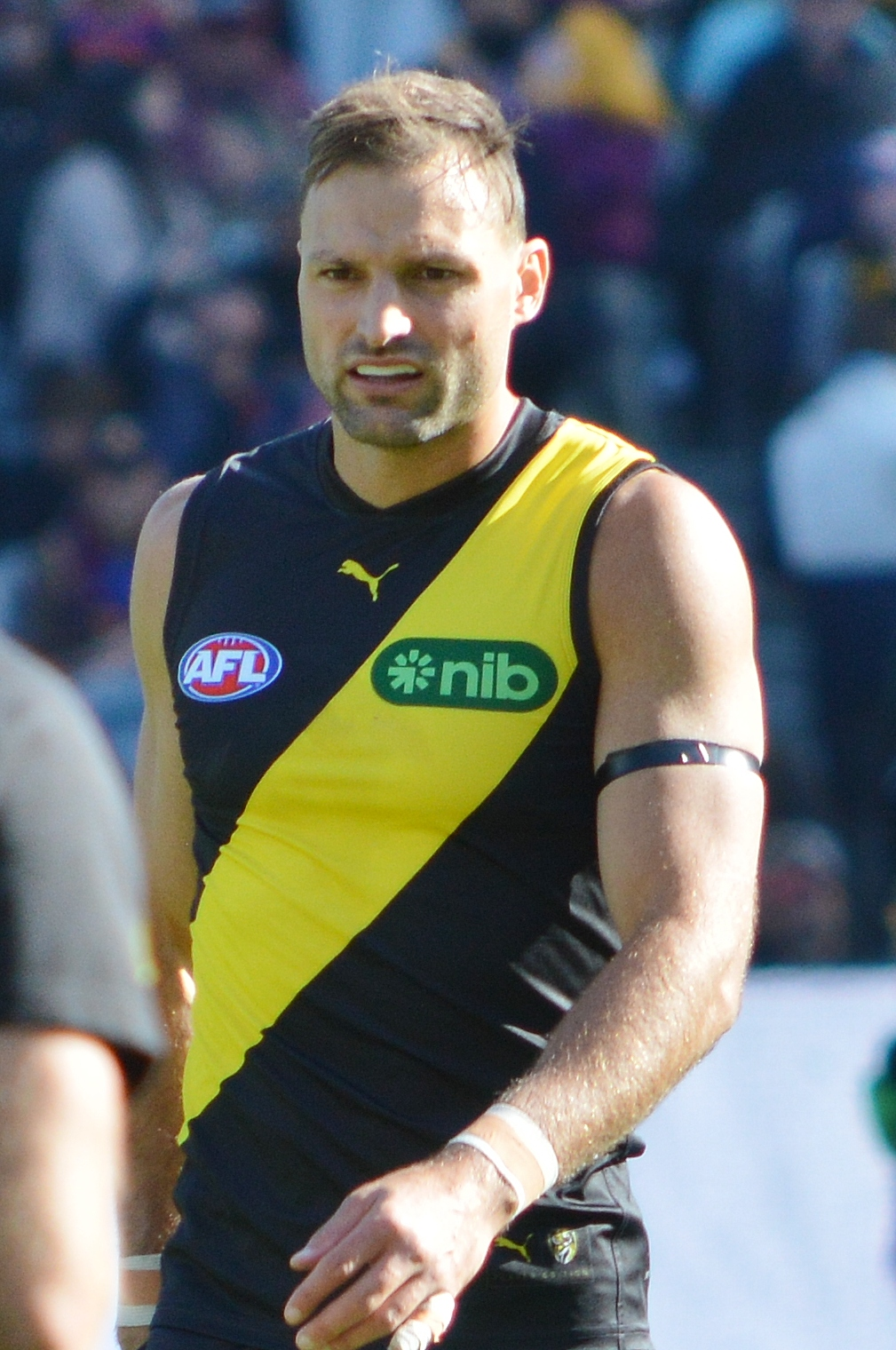
- Nankervis with Richmond in April 2025

Personal information
- Full name: Toby Nankervis
- Nicknames: Nank the Tank, Nankpickvis, Pencil
- Born: 12 August 1994 (age 32)
- Original team: North Launceston (TFL)
- Draft: No. 35, 2013 AFL national draft: Sydney
- Debut: Round 14, 2015, Sydney vs. Port Adelaide, at SCG
- Height: 199 cm (6 ft 6 in)
- Weight: 102 kg (225 lb)
- Position: Ruck

Club information
- Current club: Richmond
- Number: 25

Playing career^{1}
Years	Club	Games (Goals)
2014–2016	Sydney	12 (3)
2017–	Richmond	179 (45)
Total		191 (48)
- ^{1} Playing statistics correct to the end of 2026.

Career highlights
- Richmond captain: 2022–; 3× AFL premiership player: 2017, 2019, 2020; Maurie Fleming Medal (3rd RFC B&F): 2024; Kevin Bartlett Medal (5th RFC B&F): 2025

Toby Nankervis (born 12 August 1994) is a professional Australian rules footballer playing for the Richmond Football Club in the Australian Football League (AFL). He previously played 12 matches for the Sydney Swans from 2014 to 2016 after being drafted by the club with the 35th pick in the 2013 AFL national draft. Nankervis is a three-time premiership player with Richmond, winning in 2017, 2019 and 2020. Nankervis served as Richmond co-captain from 2022 to 2023, and will serve as the sole captain from the 2024 season.

== Early life and junior football ==
Nankervis was born to parents Sharon and Kingsley in August 1994. He spent his early years in the South-West Melbourne suburb of Point Cook before the family moved to the rural northern Tasmanian town of George Town where he attended school at Lilydale District High School. There he played junior football for Lilydale in the junior divisions of the North Eastern Football Union, including in an under 16s premiership in 2009 alongside fellow future-AFL draftee Jay Lockhart. He later played football above his age group in senior matches for the North Launceston Football Club in the Tasmanian Football League while still a junior.

Nankervis was draft eligible in 2012, but was passed over in both the national and rookie drafts.

In 2013 Nankervis represented Tasmania in the National Under 18 Championships. He was particularly dominant in a match against the Northern Territory where he recorded 22 disposals, nine marks and kicked five goals. He was named the competition's best ruck, winning All-Australian selection as well as being a joint winner of the Harrison Medal for Division 2's best and fairest player.

In addition to football, Nankervis was also a promising junior cricketer. He was once a member of the Tasmanian Cricket Academy and played for his state through Under-17s level.

== AFL career ==
=== Sydney (2014-2016) ===
Nankervis was drafted by Sydney with the club's third pick and the 35th selection overall in the 2013 AFL National draft.

Nankervis did not play senior football for the Swans in his first season, instead playing 18 matches with the club's reserves side in the NEAFL. He was on the brink of selection on a number of times, being named as a senior emergency in eight matches that season.

He made his debut in round 14 2015, in a match against Port Adelaide at the Sydney Cricket Ground He kicked a goal on debut, to go along with ten disposals and six hit outs. He finished the season having played five matches at AFL level.

Nankervis was considered a fourth option ruckman in 2016, clearly behind teammates Kurt Tippett, Callum Sinclair and Sam Naismith. He played sporadically across the year, playing a total of seven matches. He played in the club's semi-final match against Adelaide, recording a then-career-high 15 disposals along with 16 hit-outs. Whilst he did not ultimately play, Nankervis was named as an emergency in the Swans' 2016 Grand Final team. Though his impact at senior level was minimal, he was named in the 2016 NEAFL Team of the Year for his performances in the club's reserve side. He played 13 matches for the reserves side, kicking 19 goals in the process. In a match against Eastlake he kicked six goals and took 11 marks. At the conclusion of the 2016 season, Nankervis sought a contract away from Sydney, looking for greater opportunities to play at the AFL level.

=== Richmond (2017–present) ===
==== 2017 season ====
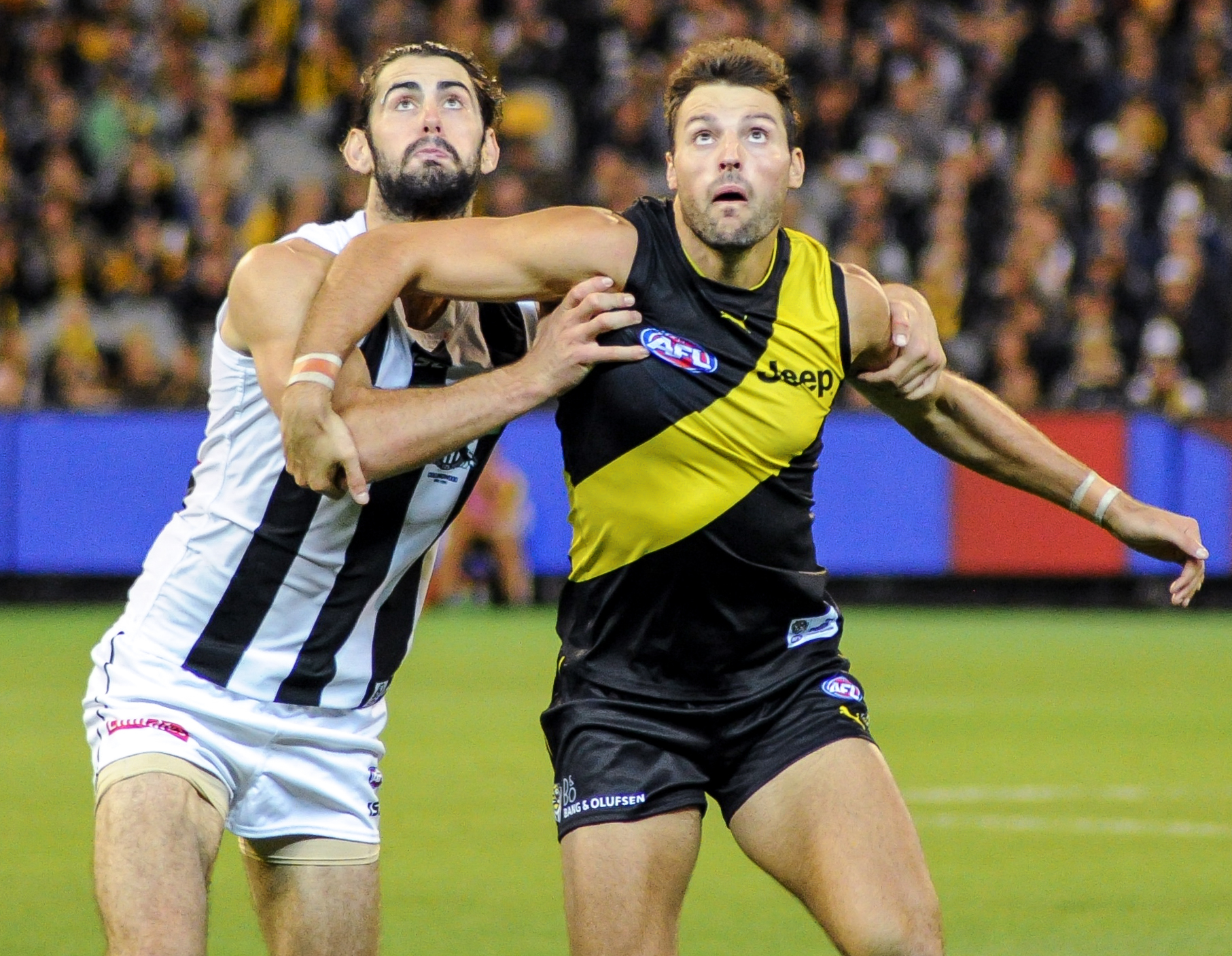
Nankervis contests a boundary throw-in with Collingwood's Brodie Grundy in round 2, 2017

On 19 October 2016 he was traded to Richmond in exchange for a third round draft selection. In his first pre-season at the club, Nankervis was lauded for his aggressive playing style, with Richmond forward Sam Lloyd claiming Nankervis had "a bit of mongrel in him." The club's coaching staff also heaped praise upon him, with Blake Caracella noting his willingness to "hit bodies and follow up and chase" while Andrew McQualter claimed Nankervis had "nearly put a couple of our players in hospital with his tackles." On the back of his impressive pre-season training efforts and a serious back injury to fellow ruck Shaun Hampson, Nankervis spent the JLT Community Series playing as the club's primary ruckman. He solidified his standing thanks to three consecutive strong performances and forced his way into position as the club's leading ruck. Nankervis made his Richmond debut in the 2017 season opening match, a victory over Carlton at the MCG. He recorded career bests for hit-outs (27) and goals (2) in the match. Nankervis followed this up with another impressive game in round 2's win over Collingwood. Though Nankervis was beaten in the ruck by Brodie Grundy (45-18 hit-outs), it was his work around the ground that impressed coach Damien Hardwick. He recorded career highs for disposals (21), clearances (an equal team-high seven), inside-50s (6), rebound-50s (3) and contested possessions (14). It was the most contested possessions by a Richmond ruckman since Brad Ottens recorded 18 in round 17, 2003. Nankervis set a Richmond club record in round 5 when he posted 56 hitouts in a win over Melbourne on Anzac Day eve. At the time he was ranked third in the league for Rucks under Champion Data's ranking points system which aggregates various statistical categories. In round 6, Nankervis was reported for an off-the-ball elbow on Adelaide's David Mackay. He was subsequently offered (and accepted) a one-match suspension by the AFL's Match Review Panel. He returned in the club's round 8 loss to Fremantle. In May Nankervis was labelled "a revelation" by The Age journalist Rohan Connolly, for his presence in a revitalised Richmond midfield. In the same article he was rated the sixth best trade pick-up of the off-season. Jon Ralph of the Herald Sun went so far as to label Nankervis the number one recruit in the league that year. In round 10's Dreamtime at the 'G match, Nankervis would kick a running goal from the 50 metre arc to seal the game in the final two minutes. After ten rounds Nankervis ranked 20th in the league for hit-outs (26.4), but among rucks was sixth in clearances (2.9), and fifth for both tackles (3.1) and disposals (13.8). He played his old club Sydney in round 13 and equaled a career high nine tackles in the match. When young ruck Ivan Soldo was added to the side in round 17, Nankervis saw a change in role, moved from a midfield exclusive role to one incorporating stints in the Richmond forward line. An eye-injury to full forward Jack Riewoldt caused him to miss round 19 and saw Nankervis asked to fill his role, kicking a career high three goals in the process. In the five match period that Soldo was in the team (including two with Riewoldt out), Nankervis saw his percentage of playing time in the forward line increase from less than three per cent to 36 per cent. Nankervis resumed full ruck duties by round 22 though, with Soldo having played his last senior game of the year. He continued on in the ruck through winning finals against Geelong and Greater Western Sydney on the way to a Grand Final match-up with minor premiers Adelaide. Though no player on either side had played in a Grand Final before, Nankervis had the unique experience of being the only player to have warmed up for one, having been an emergency in the previous year' game while with the Swans. He ultimately became a premiership player in 2017 though, logging 28 hitouts, 18 disposals, four marks and three tackles in his side's 48 point victory. He finished 2017 rating fifth at the club for total clearances (68) and third for tackles (97) that year. He also ranked 11th in the league for total hitouts and recorded the seventh most hit outs ever in a season by a Richmond player (593).

==== 2018 season ====
On the back of his premiership year, Nankervis earned a further one-year contract extension, seeing him secured to Richmond until at least the end of the 2020 season. He spent part of the 2018 pre season training as a forward, preparing for the ultimately unsuccessful potential injury return of Shaun Hampson that could have seen Nankervis play significant forward-line minutes. In the first pre-season match of 2018 Nankervis sustained a concussion mid match and sat out the majority of the match as a result. He returned in the second and final match of the series though, before playing as lead ruck in the club's season-opening round 1 win over Carlton. Nankervis kicked his first goal of the season in round 3 and in round 6 recorded a career-high 29 disposals, besting eventual All-Australian Brodie Grundy despite losing in the ruck with just 17 hitouts. For that performance he earned five votes in the AFL Coaches Association award as the equal-third best player on the ground. After eight rounds Nankervis ranked third at Richmond for contested possessions, centre clearances and total clearances behind only club captain Trent Cotchin and reigning Brownlow Medalist Dustin Martin. He suffered a minor injury to his right wrist when falling in a ruck contest in round 8 that saw him fail to train in the lead up to round 9's match against West Coast in Perth. Nankervis was ruled fit to play despite the injury, but was beaten by his Eagles counterparts Nic Naitanui and Scott Lycett who carried West Coast to a win. In round 11's marquee Dreamtime at the 'G match against Essendon, Nankervis kicked two goals and was named among Richmond's best players by AFL Media in the 71-point victory. He picked up a single coaches vote in round 15, this time for laying a team high 10 tackles. Nankervis again earned a coaches vote in round 18's victory over St Kilda. Three weeks later Nankervis suffered a minor quad cork injury during round 20 that saw him miss the club's round 21 match Gold Coast. He missed just one match however, returning to play in each of the club's two final matches before the finals series. Nankervis concluded the home and away season ranked second among the league's rucks for average disposals per game while Richmond earned the minor premiership and a home qualifying final against Hawthorn. He contributed 14 disposals in a win during that match and a further 16 in what would prove a shock preliminary final loss to rivals Collingwood that brought Nankervis' and the club's season to an end. Nankervis was comprehensibly beaten by opposition ruck Brodie Grundy in that final match, allowing Grundy an all-time finals record 56 hit outs. After playing 23 matches and kicking seven goals that year, Nankervis placed 13th in the Richmond club best and fairest award.

==== 2019 season ====
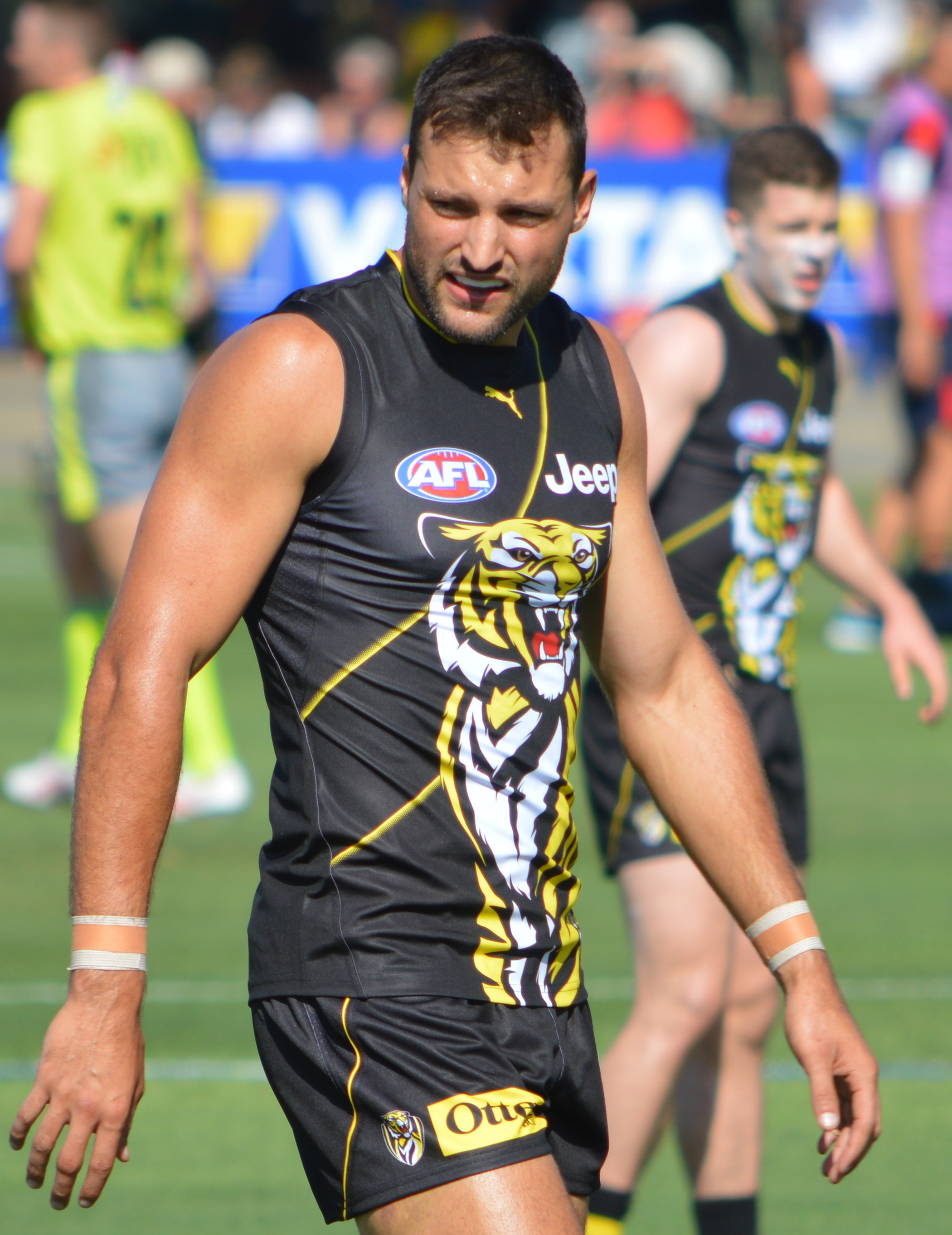
Nankervis during the 2019 pre-season

After a complete pre-season training period, Nankervis began 2019 playing as a forward, in order to allow the club to trial potential ruck backups Ivan Soldo and Noah Balta. He kicked three goals while playing the role in the first of Richmond's pre-season matches, before shifting to the primary ruck role and adding one more goal in their final match of the series. Nankvervis started the season with a particularly strong performance, recording 17 disposals, 34 hit outs and an equal career-best three goals while playing lead ruck, earning four votes in the coaches' association award in the process. He received another two votes in that award for his 14 disposals and one goal in round 4, earning the fifth most votes of any Richmond player that day. In round 6's ANZAC Day eve match against Melbourne, Nankervis again attracted three coaches votes, but also received a $2000 fine for a careless low impact strike on opposition forward Tom McDonald. Two weeks later Nankervis would suffer a serious right adductor injury in a ruck contest during the first quarter of a match against Fremantle in round 8. Though he returned to the field for a short period of play after the initial injury, he would be ruled out for the rest of the match by half time. The club later confirmed the injury to be a high grade tear that had seen muscle and some tendon come off the bone, and announced an expected recovery time period of eight weeks. Though he had returned to full speed running within six weeks, slower progression with strength in the muscle saw estimates of a return push back at least two more weeks. Nankervis made his return to football through the VFL in mid-July, recording 13 hit outs, eight disposals and a goal in managed minutes. He played a further two matches at reserves-level, gradually increasing his playing time as he continued to recover towards full fitness. Nankervis made a return to AFL football in round 21, contributing 25 disposals and an equal season-best 34 hitouts in a win over Carlton in which he also received a $3000 fine for striking opposition midfielder Marc Murphy. His stint lasted just the one match however, after he was a late withdrawal with groin soreness the following week. Nankervis made his return after two weeks rest with impressive performance in a VFL qualifying final win over the Essendon reserves in which he managed 22 disposals, 33 hitouts and a match winning final quarter goal despite a poor start and only playing limited minutes. It was enough to earn him a senior-level recall for the club's AFL qualifying final win over the Brisbane Lions the following week in which he recorded 24 hitouts while supporting lead ruck Ivan Soldo. He had a quiet performance in the preliminary final that followed, finishing with just 11 hitouts and five disposals in the win over Geelong that earned his side a grand final berth against Greater Western Sydney. Nankervis' output lifted considerably in the grand final, notching an equal season-best 17 disposals along with 22 hitouts to help his side to an 89-point victory and a second premiership in three seasons.

==== 2020 season ====
Nankervis underwent groin surgery to reattach his abductor tendon to the bone in the 2019/20 off-season, and had a significantly reduced pre-season training program as a result. After limited minutes in match-simulation sessions in early February, Nankervis targeted a return to top-level match-play for the club's final pre-season game in March. He ultimately missed selection for that match and instead made his return in a VFL practice match in the first week March and was scheduled to play in another the following week that was eventually cancelled due to safety concerns as a result of the rapid progression of the coronavirus pandemic into Australia. Nankervis was recalled to AFL level when the season began a week later, recording 16 hit outs in significantly limited minutes as second-string to lead ruck Ivan Soldo in a win over Carlton that was played without crowds in attendance due to public health prohibitions on large gatherings. In what was the first of what the league planned would be a reduced 17-round season, the match was also played with quarter lengths reduced by one fifth in order to reduce the physical load on players who would be expected to play multiple matches with short breaks in the second half of the year. Just three days later, the AFL Commission suspended the season for an indefinite period after multiple states enforced border closures. Nankervis was dropped from AFL level when the season resumed after an 11-week hiatus, instead playing an unofficial scratch match against Collingwood's reserves due to AFL clubs' withdrawal from the VFL season. After one further match at reserves level, Nankervis was recalled for the club's round 4 AFL match against St Kilda where he was the club's best player, earning five coaches award votes for a performance that included 26 hitouts, 17 disposals and a goal. He lasted just one more match at the level, suffering a serious syndesmosis ankle injury in round 5's win over Melbourne. Nankervis stayed in Melbourne to undergo surgery on the ankle in the week that followed, while his teammates relocated to the Gold Coast as a result of a virus outbreak in Melbourne. In mid-July Nankervis traveled to Queensland and by the end of month he had joined his teammates after clearing the state's mandated 14-day quarantine. Nankervis joined the main training group by the second week of August and was recalled to AFL level for the club's round 14 match against West Coast. He recorded 14 disposals and an equal game-high six tackles, while playing a supporting role to lead ruck Ivan Soldo. In the next match following the club's one week bye, Nankervis would be elevated to the lead ruck position after Soldo suffered a season-ending knee injury. Nankervis recorded just 11 hit outs in the club's first-up qualifying final loss to the Brisbane Lions, before improving to 15 hit outs and four clearances in a semi-final win over St Kilda. He trailed only Dustin Martin for best on ground honours in the preliminary final that followed, notching a game-high 10 tackles, as well as recording three marks and 10 hit outs in the fourth quarter of that comeback win over Port Adelaide. Nankervis became a triple-premiership player the following week, leading all players for pressure acts in what the Herald Sun described as a "lion-hearted" performance as his team defeated Geelong by 31 points in the 2020 grand final.

== Player profile ==
Nankervis plays as a ruck and is particularly adept at the non-traditional ground ball aspects of the role including tackling and winning centre clearances. He is also noteworthy for his contested marking ability and can play as a relief tall forward.

== Statistics ==
Updated to the end of round 22, 2026.

Legend
G	Goals	K	Kicks	D	Disposals	T	Tackles
B	Behinds	H	Handballs	M	Marks	H/O	Hit-outs

Season	Team	No.	Games	Totals								Averages (per game)								Votes
Season	Team	No.	Games	G	B	K	H	D	M	T	H/O	G	B	K	H	D	M	T	H/O	Votes
2014	Sydney	13	0	—	—	—	—	—	—	—	—	—	—	—	—	—	—	—	—	0
2015	Sydney	13	5	1	2	17	22	39	9	20	42	0.2	0.4	3.4	4.4	7.8	1.8	4.0	8.4	0
2016	Sydney	13	7	2	2	26	55	81	12	36	99	0.3	0.3	3.7	7.9	11.6	1.7	5.1	14.1	0
2017^{#}	Richmond	25	24	11	7	186	169	355	74	97	593	0.5	0.3	7.8	7.0	14.8	3.1	4.0	24.7	2
2018	Richmond	25	23	7	3	209	173	382	89	81	575	0.3	0.1	9.1	7.5	16.6	3.9	3.5	25.0	3
2019^{#}	Richmond	25	12	4	2	76	79	155	28	43	261	0.3	0.2	6.3	6.6	12.9	2.3	3.6	21.8	1
2020^{#}	Richmond	25	11	3	1	62	64	126	26	45	184	0.3	0.1	5.6	5.8	11.5	2.4	4.1	16.7	0
2021	Richmond	25	16	1	5	114	153	267	49	57	360	0.1	0.3	7.1	9.6	16.7	3.1	3.6	22.5	3
2022	Richmond	25	23	5	7	186	208	394	60	86	628	0.2	0.3	8.1	9.0	17.1	2.6	3.7	27.3	3
2023	Richmond	25	15	3	4	130	121	251	37	82	487	0.2	0.3	8.7	8.1	16.7	2.5	5.5	32.5	0
2024	Richmond	25	21	2	6	162	174	336	69	111	684	0.1	0.3	7.7	8.3	16.0	3.3	5.3	32.6	1
2025	Richmond	25	22	6	2	173	176	349	47	84	727	0.3	0.1	7.9	8.0	15.9	2.1	3.8	33.0	2
2026	Richmond	25	10	3	2	58	103	161	13	35	248	0.3	0.2	5.8	10.3	16.1	1.3	3.5	24.8	0
Career			189	48	43	1399	1497	2896	513	777	4888	0.3	0.2	7.4	7.9	15.3	2.7	4.1	25.9	15

== Honours and achievements ==
Team

- 3× AFL premiership player (Richmond): 2017, 2019 2020
- McClelland Trophy (Richmond): 2018

Individual

- Maurie Fleming Medal (3rd RFC B&F): 2024

Junior

- U18 division 2 best and fairest: 2013
- U18 All Australian: 2013

== Personal life ==
Outside of football, Nankervis has trained as an apprentice carpenter.
