= Dion Prestia =

Australian rules footballer (born 1992)

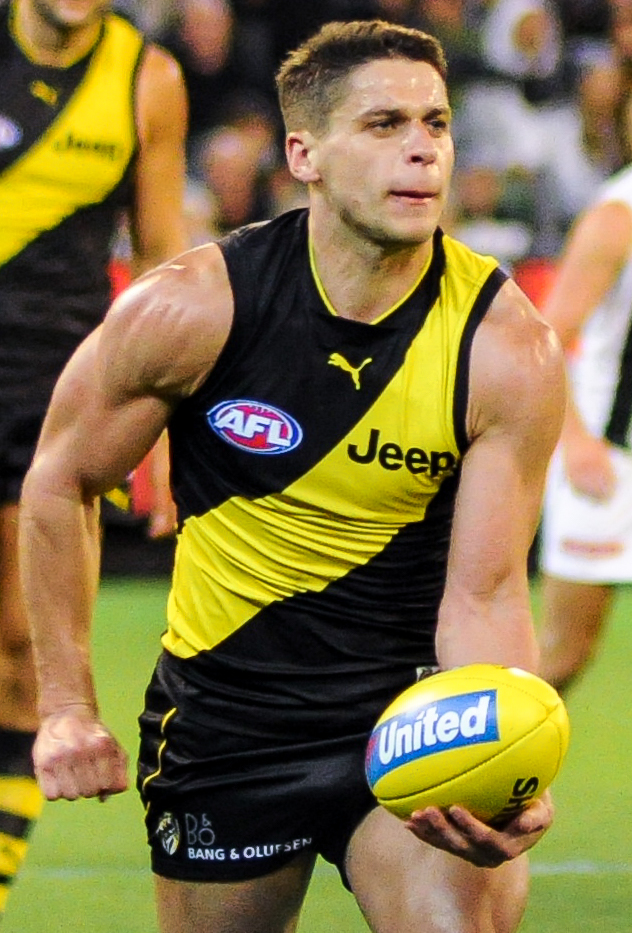
- Prestia playing for Richmond in March 2017

Personal information
- Nicknames: The Human Meatball, Meatball
- Born: 12 October 1992 (age 34)
- Original teams: Calder Cannons (TAC Cup); Greenvale (EDFL)
- Draft: No. 9, 2010 AFL National draft: Gold Coast
- Debut: Round 2, 2011, Gold Coast vs. Carlton, at The Gabba
- Height: 175 cm (5 ft 9 in)
- Weight: 82 kg (181 lb)
- Position: Midfielder

Playing career^{1}
Years	Club	Games (Goals)
2011–2016	Gold Coast	95 (30)
2017–2026	Richmond	159 (48)
Total		254 (78)
- ^{1} Playing statistics correct to the end of 2026.

Career highlights
- season AFL: 3× AFL premiership player: 2017, 2019, 2020; Yiooken Award: 2022; 2× 22under22 team: 2013, 2014; Richmond: Jack Dyer Medal: 2019; Maurie Fleming Medal (3rd RFC B&F): 2022; Richmond Life Member: 2017; Gold Coast: Gold Coast vice captain: 2014–2016; Inaugural Gold Coast AFL team: 2011; Junior: 2× TAC Cup premiership player: 2009, 2010; Calder Cannons Team of the First 20 Years

Dion Prestia (born 12 October 1992) is a former professional Australian rules footballer who played for the Richmond Football Club in the Australian Football League (AFL). He previously played 95 games over six seasons with the Gold Coast Suns, after being drafted to the club in the first round of the 2010 draft and being a member of the club's inaugural AFL side in 2011. Prestia is a one-time Richmond club champion and a three-time premiership player, following Richmond premierships in 2017, 2019 and 2020.

== Early life and junior football ==
Prestia grew up in the Melbourne suburb of Craigieburn, playing for the West Lalor Junior Football Club in the Diamond Valley Football League before moving to the Greenvale Football Club in the Essendon District Football League (EDFL).

In 2009 Prestia began playing with the Calder Cannons in the TAC Cup. He was a member of the club's premiership side that season and playing in 10 games total across the year. He held averages of 24 disposals, three marks and three tackles per game. Prestia returned to the club in 2010, again playing a key role on the way to premiership glory. He was a standout performer in the preliminary final and played a starring role in the club's Grand Final victory, kicking a goal and recording 36 disposals and eight clearances. Prestia finished the season having played nine matches with averages of 28 disposals, four marks, five tackles and a goal per game. Prestia was the runner-up in the club's best and fairest award, the Robert Hyde Medal. He placed 11th in the Morrish Medal, the award given to the league's best and fairest player. He was further recognised for his contribution to the club, when in 2015 he was selected in the Cannons' "Team of the First 20 Years".

Prestia was selected to represent the Victorian Metropolitan side at the national Under 18 championships in 2010. His tournament was short-lived however, as despite recording 21 disposals in the opening game of the tournament, a torn hamstring sustained in his second match would see him ruled out for the remainder of the series.

He attended high school at Assumption College in the Victorian town of Kilmore.

== AFL career ==
=== Gold Coast (2011–2016) ===
==== 2011 season ====
Prestia was drafted by the Gold Coast with the club's fifth selection and the ninth selection overall in the 2010 AFL National Draft.

In the 2011 pre-season, Prestia was earmarked by coach Guy McKenna as the choice for the player likely to have the best career amongst the Suns' underage recruits. Prestia made his AFL debut in the club's inaugural AFL match, against Carlton in round 2 of the 2011 season. Prestia played three straight matches before spending six weeks away from the club's senior side. He returned the team in round 10 and played in all of the next 14 consecutive matches. He kicked his first career goal in round 11 against West Coast and played in his first win in round 17 against Richmond. Prestia finished the season having played 17 matches and recording 16.5 disposals per game. His 42 clearances was good for ninth best at the club while his 280 total disposals ranked 10th.

==== 2012 season ====
Prestia played the first nine matches of the season in 2012, including in round 6 where he recorded 32 disposals, his first time breaking the 30 touch barrier. He suffered a hamstring injury early into the club's round 19 loss to Melbourne. He spent time on the sidelines as a result and would not return to play again in 2012. At the end of the season he had played just 14 matches.

==== 2013 season ====
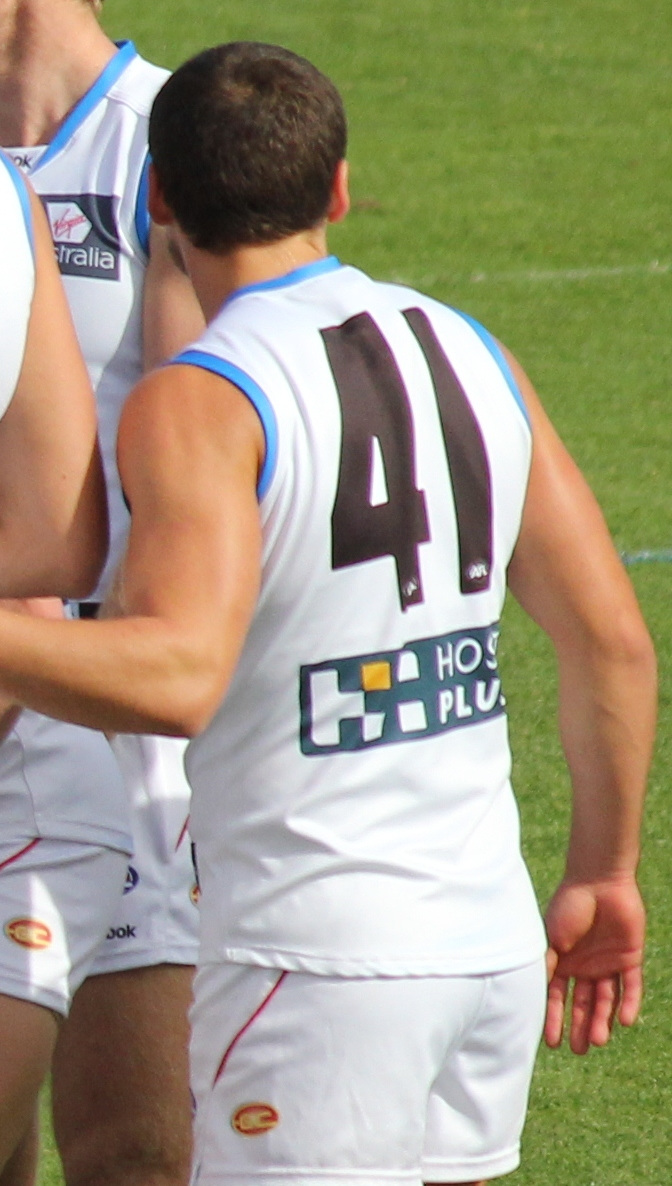
Prestia with Gold Coast in May 2012

2013 marked a "breakout year" for Prestia according to the Herald Sun's Sam Landsberger. In round 9 Prestia was named among the Suns' best by AFL Media, with 32 disposals and a goal in the 26 point loss to Hawthorn. Prestia set a career best in tackles in round 10, when he laid 12 against Geelong in the loss at Kardinia Park. He was once again named in the bests in round 11, this time with 28 disposals against North Melbourne. Prestia played a stand-out role in the club's round 14 match against Adelaide. He recorded a career-best 42 disposals and a career-best two goals in the match. He received three Brownlow votes for the match, his first such best-on-ground for his career. Prestia played his 50th career match in round 22, in a loss to St Kilda at Etihad Stadium. At the conclusion of the season Prestia had played in a then-best 20 games, recording a club-second 509 disposals. He placed second behind club captain (and three time consecutive winner) Gary Ablett Jr. in the club's best and fairest award. Despite interest from multiple Victorian clubs including Melbourne and St Kilda, Prestia stayed true to the Suns and signed a three-year contract extension to remain on the Gold Coast until the end of 2016.

==== 2014 season ====
Prestia had an outstanding pre-season ahead of 2014, showing real determination in training and recording a personal best in the two kilometre time trial. He did however suffer a minor calf tear in February, that would restrict his training load in the immediate run-up to round 1. After being a member of the Suns' emerging leaders group in 2013, media speculation in early 2014 suggested he was ready for a role in the club's leadership group proper and that he was even a possible future captain of the club. He was later elected by his peers to join the group and to serve as one of the club's vice-captains. He began the season in exceptional form, recording 20 or more disposals in each of his first 13 matches. He had more than 30 disposals in five of those 13. Prestia was a stand-out in the club's round 10 victory over Western Bulldogs, with 25 disposals, five tackles and six marks to his name. He received best-on-ground honours with three votes in the Brownlow Medal tally that round. With the win the Suns finished the round in the top four of the ladder, the first such occasion in club history. To that point in the season Prestia was the 21st ranked player in the league according to the AFL's official statistics partner Champion Data's ranking point system. Prestia was instrumental in round 13, where his 11 disposal quarter helped the Suns compete in an ultimately narrow loss to St Kilda. He finished the match with 38 disposals. For the first time in his young-career, Prestia finished the season playing in all 22 of the Suns' matches that season. He gathered 25 or more disposals in 15 of those games, and ranked number one at the club for total disposals (596), equal-first for clearances (118) and third for inside-50s (87), all while kicking a career best 10 goals. He placed third in the club's best and fairest award for his efforts in the superb season. His 13 Brownlow Medal votes was the second most of a Suns player, behind Gary Ablett's 22.

==== 2015 season ====
Another injury-interrupted pre-season awaited Prestia in 2015, when he injured his hamstring in a training incident late in 2014. To that point, he had been a stand-out on the training track, winning the club's 2 km time trial and looking likely to repeat the form of the 2014 season. He played his first football that year in the club's final NAB Challenge hit-out, showing no signs of his injury with 29 disposals in the draw against the Brisbane Lions. In round 1 Prestia was the Suns' best-on-ground, picking up 29 disposals and a Brownlow vote in the Suns' loss to Melbourne. round 3's loss to Geelong saw Prestia continue what AFL Media called a "rich vein of form", with a team-high 29 disposals in the match. After five rounds Prestia was the number one clearance winner in the league (46). To that point he was also ranked 14th in the league for disposals (142) and fourth for contested possessions (76). During the Suns' round 8 match against Collingwood, Prestia went down with what appeared was a serious knee injury. Scane later revealed he had suffered a torn lateral meniscus in his left knee. With 12–16 weeks forecasted on the sidelines, Prestia's season effectively came to an end. He had played in all eight matches to that point in the season, recording equal-career bests in average disposals and goals per game as well as leading the competition for total clearances.

==== 2016 season ====
Entering the 2016 season media speculation surrounded Prestia and his contract status at the Suns. With just one year left on his deal with the Gold Coast, he was the target of recruiting efforts by multiple clubs around the league. As with the previous two seasons, Prestia would again serve as a club vice-captain in 2016. Prestia would return to fitness in time for the Suns' round 1 clash with Essendon, recording 29 disposals and one goal in the victory. By the end of round 9 Prestia was the third leading disposal getter at the Suns (24.9 per game) as well as second for contested possessions and third in clearances, inside-50s and tackles. For the second straight year Prestia would suffer a season ending knee injury when he sustained a knock in the club's round 16 win over Brisbane. Minor surgery would follow, but the recovery time would rule him out for the rest of the season after playing just 14 matches that year.

Before the season was over, media speculation concerning Prestia's future was again intense. By mid-July he was linked to offers from Carlton, Melbourne and Richmond. One day after the Suns' last game of the season, Prestia announced publicly that he was seeking a trade to a Melbourne-based club. To this point he had received a five-year contract offer from Richmond and was expected to announce the club as his preferred destination. He did so on the 31st of August, setting the table for the two clubs to arrange a deal for his exchange He had played 95 games with Gold Coast over a six-year period. Prestia had played the eighth most games of any Suns player, and was the club's second highest disposal and clearance getter (2241 and 422) and third highest tackle getter across his time there (421).

=== Richmond (2017–present) ===
==== 2017 season ====
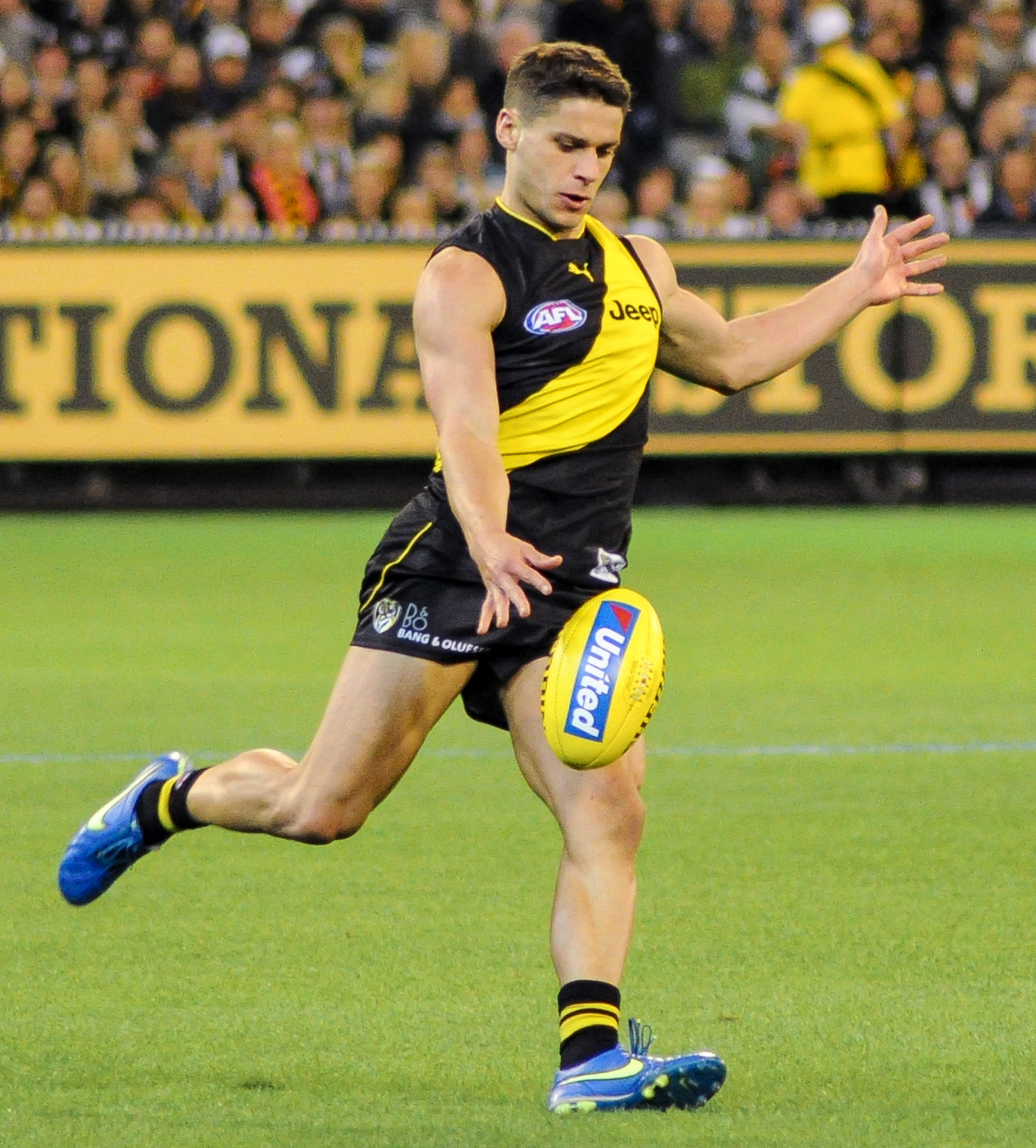
Prestia kicks during play in round 2, 2017

Prestia was officially traded to Richmond on 19 October 2016, in exchange for a first round draft selection and a swap of second round picks.

He spent much of his first Richmond pre-season on light duties, still recovering from knee surgery underwent on the Gold Coast. Prestia made his Richmond debut in the opening match of the season, Richmond's round 1 victory against Carlton at the MCG. He finished the match with a team-second 28 disposals as well as six clearances, five tackles and a goal. The 73,137 strong crowd was the largest Prestia had ever played in front of, with the previous top of 49,069 coming in 2014 against Adelaide at the Adelaide Oval. In early April club officials revealed Prestia would likely remain on a reduced training load for the entire season, in an attempt to keep him fit and able to play his first full season in three years. Prestia's 22 disposals and seven tackles in round 4 helped Richmond to a victory over Brisbane and the club's first 4–0 start to a season since 1995. He played his 100th career match in Richmond's round 5 win over Melbourne, recording 20 disposals in the process. Prestia was held from playing in the club's round 7 match against the Western Bulldogs due to a hamstring injury. He returned two weeks later in a match against the GWS Giants at Sydney's Spotless Stadium in round 9. Prestia upped his training load in June, participating twice a week for the first time that season. He recorded a season-best 35 disposals and nine marks in round 11's win over North Melbourne in addition to five clearances and five inside 50s. After round 13 Prestia ranked equal third in the league for smothers that season (15). Prestia's season was labelled as "poor" by Herald Sun chief football writer Mark Robinson in July, claiming he had "under delivered" as a "big name recruit on a big contract." In round 17 Prestia was given the task to run with Brisbane Lions All Australian Dayne Zorko. He was largely effective in the role, keeping Zorko to just 11 disposals, his second lowest tally of the season. Complications with his knee and calf issues returned in late July and forced Prestia to miss one match in round 19. Prestia repeated his run-with role upon his return in round 20, this time against another All Australian midfielder, Hawthorn's Tom Mitchell. While Mitchell remained prolific with 35 disposals, his kick tally of nine was his lowest for the year. Meanwhile, Prestia had 31 disposals himself, including 17 kicks and a goal. By round 20 Richmond had qualified for the year's final series, Prestia's first in his seven-year career. During the pre-finals bye, Prestia was the subject of media attention after leaving training early due to an ankle injury. Though he and the club assured it was only minor and would not keep him from playing, he did reveal it was the continuation of an ankle issue that had plagued him for a majority of the 2017 season. In Richmond's qualifying final victory Prestia had what The West Australian called it "one of the best games of his career." He had an equal game-high 31 possessions and quelled the influence of Geelong captain Joel Selwood, who was held to just six kicks. But that win was not Richmond's only that September, with Prestia's side beating Greater Western Sydney in a preliminary final and earning their way to a Grand Final match-up with minor premiers Adelaide. He turned in a starring performance in what would be a premiership winning side, contributing 25 disposals and a goal and earning two votes in the Norm Smith Medal. In receiving a premiership medal he became the first inaugural Gold Coast Suns player to do so since he made his debut there in the club's first match six years earlier. Prestia finished the year having played 22 matches, the equal most of his career to that point. He ranked third at the club for clearances, fourth for average disposals and fifth for tackles. Prestia placed tenth in the club's best and fairest count.

==== 2018 season ====
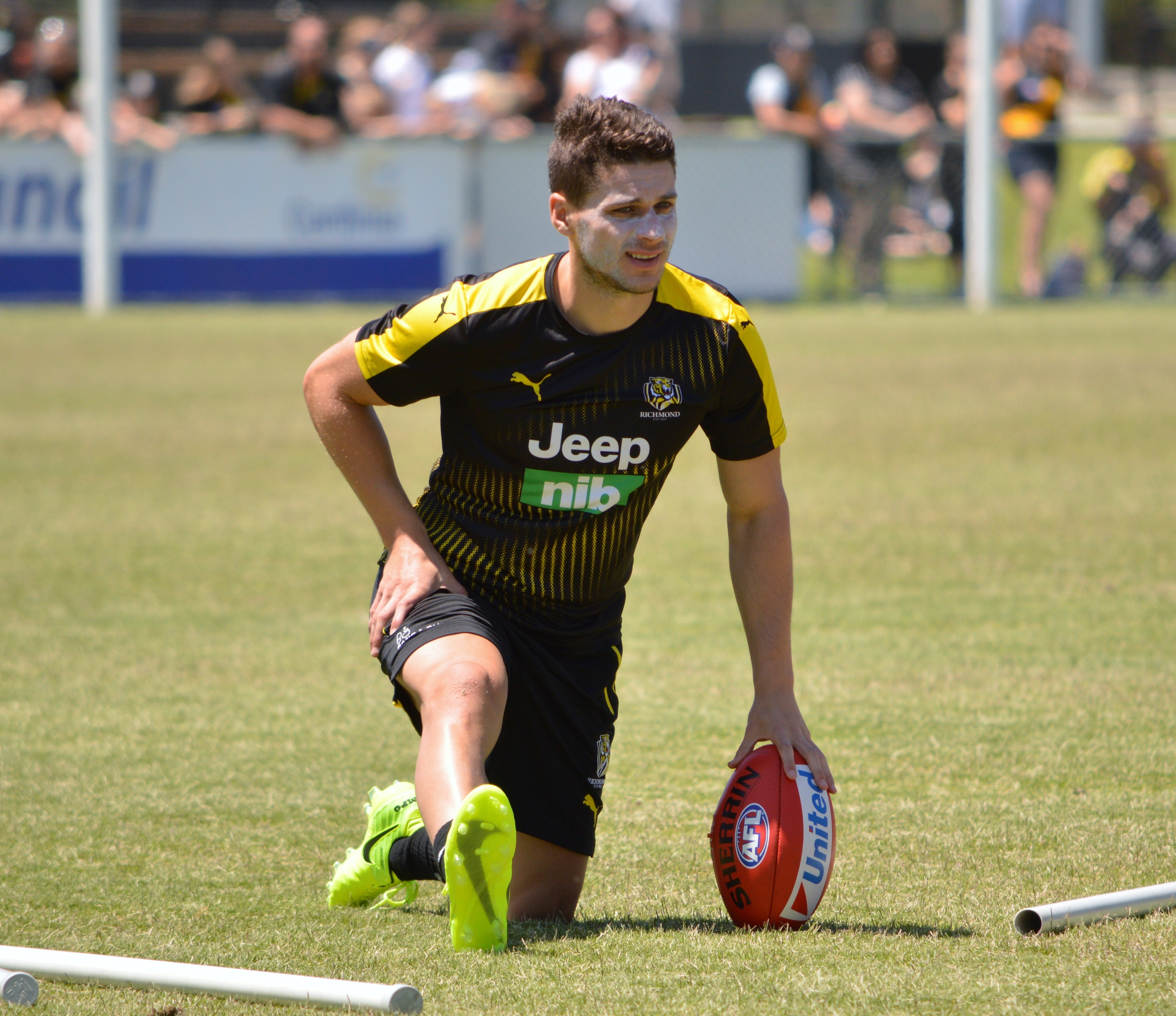
Prestia training in January 2018

In the weeks immediately following his side's 2017 premiership victory, Prestia underwent minor ankle surgery. It saw him face a minimally restricted pre-season program, confined to running exercises until mid-January. He faced another set-back in mid-February however, after sustaining a hamstring strain while training. He missed both of Richmond's JLT Community Series pre-season matches as a result despite aiming for a return in the second match of the series. A minor re-occurrence in early March saw him fail to play in round 1, instead making his return to football through the VFL the following week. He was impressive in that match, recording 19 disposals, eight tackles and five clearances on less than three quarters of game-time. He was named to make his return to AFL football in round 3 but was withdrawn from the team just a day later when he suffered a fresh glute strain at training, reportedly unrelated to his earlier soft-tissue injuries. Prestia finally made his AFL return in round 4, but was reduced to limited minutes as a precautionary measure. Despite the restriction he proved an influential player, contributing 23 disposals and a game-high seven clearances in his side's 93-point demolition of the Brisbane Lions. He remained in the side for a further three weeks including in round 7 where he sustained a minor calf injury and sat out the closing stages of that match. Scans confirmed no serious damage but the club was conservative with his recovery, opting to sit him out of the following week's match but expecting him to miss no more than two weeks. After three consecutive matches on the sidelines however, the club eventually revised their expected return date for Prestia, indicating he would miss at least a further three matches. By mid-June Prestia had made a return to conditioning work, allowing him to return to match play in round 15's clash with Sydney. The following week he was among Richmond's best players when he recorded 28 disposals, six clearances and a game-high 11 score involvements in a win over Adelaide, earning him five coaches award votes. In round 18 he posted a career-best total of three goals against St Kilda in a performance that earned him a maximum 10 coaches award votes. Prestia suffered a broken rib in the match that followed, forcing him to miss one week with the injury. While he played the full match upon his return in round 21, Prestia suffered a sore hamstring and missed round 22's clash with Essendon before playing in the club's final match of the home and away season in round 23 against the Western Bulldogs After the club secured the minor premiership, Prestia played a key role in Richmond's qualifying final win over Hawthorn with 26 disposals, five clearances and seven inside 50s along with being named by AFL Media as one of Richmond's best. In the season-ending knock-out preliminary final loss to Collingwood that followed, Prestia recorded 24 disposals but was labelled by Fox Footy as "below his best". Prestia finished the year having played 13 matches and placed 11th in the club's best and fairest count despite that low tally.

==== 2019 season ====
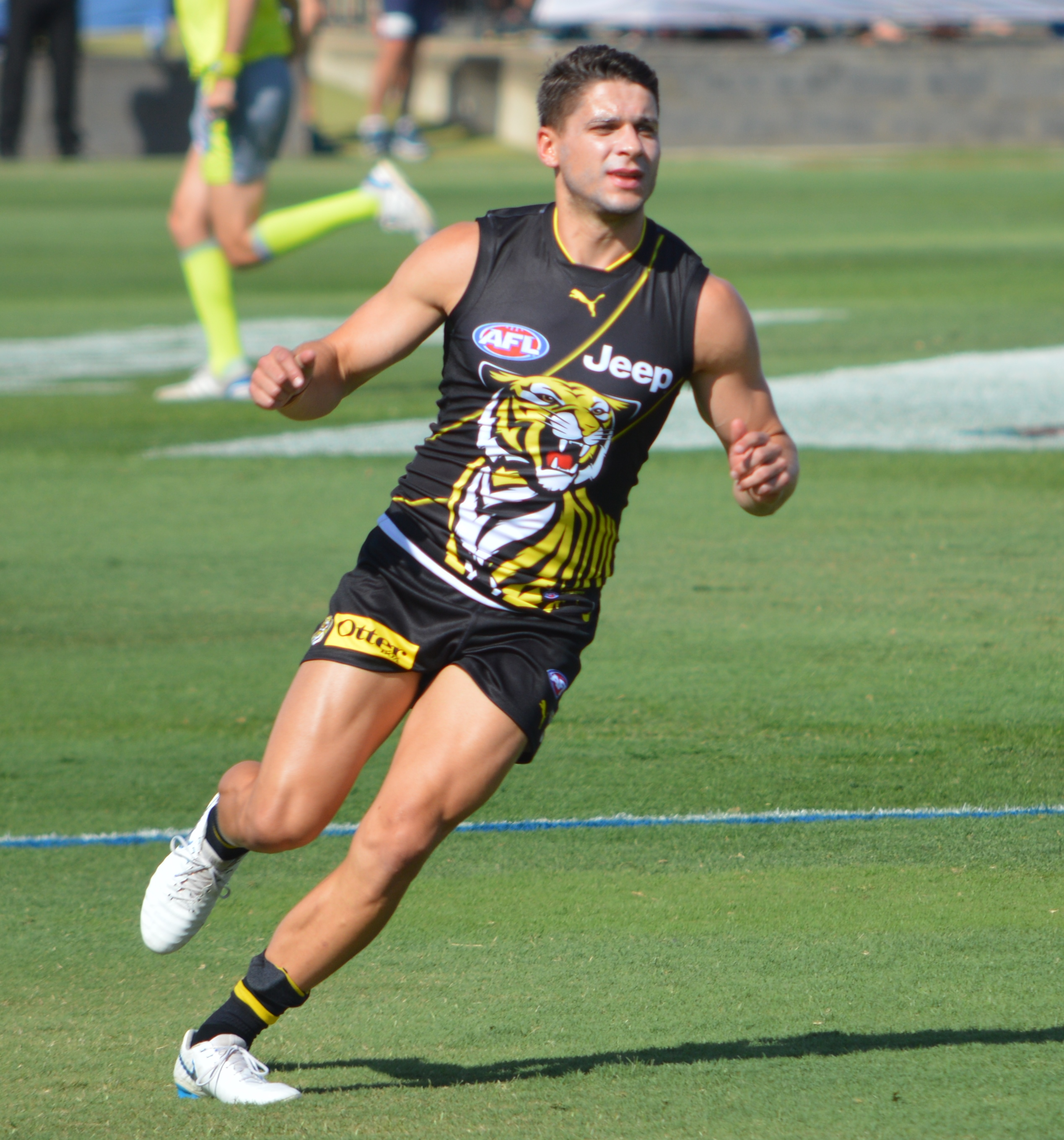
Prestia in a pre-season match in March 2019

In the lead-in to the 2019 season, Prestia completed a largely uninterrupted pre-season for the first time in three seasons as a Richmond player. He played in each of the club's two pre-season matches before turning in a 20 disposal and seven tackle performance in the season's opening match against Carlton at the MCG. Two weeks later he recorded 33 disposals and was named by The Age as Richmond's best in a round 3 loss to Greater Western Sydney From the following week forward, Prestia assumed a larger leadership role in the Richmond midfield, following the loss of Dustin Martin to suspension in round 4 and the longer-term injury loss of captain Trent Cotchin that same week. In round 5 Prestia was named as the game's second best player with seven votes in the Coaches Association player of the year award following a team-high 32 disposals and game highs in inside 50s (10) and clearances (eight). He added a further six votes the following week, before adding to that with two and four votes in wins in rounds 9 and 10 respectively. Prestia continued to play good football through the club's mid-season bye, having played all 13 matches and averaging 25.6 disposals per game. In the first game following the bye, Prestia returned to his best, winning three coaches votes in a win over St Kilda at Marvel Stadium. Prestia was best on ground in a win over his old side the Suns the following week, recording team highs in disposals (28) and tackles (nine) while also contributing eight clearances and seven score involvements to earn nine of a possible ten coaches votes. He split best on ground honours with forward Tom Lynch in round 18, again leading the team for disposals and clearances. To that point in the season, Prestia had climbed 60 places in the AFL's official statistical player ratings, from the 102nd to the 40th best player in the league. He was also leading the competition for loose-ball gets and ranked ninth for pressure acts. In round 19 Prestia led Richmond to another win with 35 disposals, equaling his best tally in three years at the club. Along with Lynch, he was the only other Richmond player to play in every match to that point in the season. He was second best afield with seven coaches votes and 31 disposals against Melbourne in round 20 before earning best afield with nine coaches votes and a team of the week berth in his 150th AFL match the following week. At season's end Prestia was named in the squad of 40 players in the running for All-Australian selection that year, though ultimately went unselected in the final team. He earned eight Brownlow Medal votes that regular season, placed eighth in The Age's Footballer of the Year award and equal 15th in the coaches association award. Despite some achilles tendon soreness in the week prior to the finals, Prestia played well to earn a mention among Richmond's best players with 32 disposals, 10 tackles and nine clearances in Richmond's 47-point qualifying final victory over the Brisbane Lions. AFL Media labelled Prestia "the dominant midfielder on the ground" in the preliminary final a fortnight later, after recording 28 disposals and kicking two goals as his side defeated Geelong and earned a grand final matchup against Greater Western Sydney. According to the AFL's statistically assessed Player Ratings system, Prestia was the number one ranked player in the league for performances between the bye and the preliminary final. In the grand final, Prestia collected 11 first-quarter disposals before attracting a tag from the Giants' Matt de Boer and finishing with 22 total in his side's 89-point victory that earned him a second premiership in three years. At the end of the finals series, Prestia ranked second in the competition for total clearances across regular season and finals matches that year, fifth for disposals and fourth for contested possessions. His tallies that season saw him ranked second for disposals, fifth for handballs, third for clearances and third for most tackles in a season by any Richmond player in club history. He was awarded the Richmond club best and fairest at season's end, after polling votes in every match of the season and recording the top possible score in each of the last eight matches of the season. He was also named as the league's eighth best midfielder and the ninth best player overall in the Herald Sun chief football reporter Mark Robinson's list of the league's best players in 2019.

==== 2020 season ====
Ahead of the 2020 season, Prestia was labelled by the AFL's statistical partner Champion Data as an 'elite' midfielder, the top category for his position. He had a slightly reduced training load in the early weeks of the 2019/20 off-season, resting his legs to treat some lingering achilles tendonitis from the season prior. After returning to full training in January, Prestia was a notable omission from the AFL's fundraising State of Origin for Bushfire Relief Match in the final week of February. He went on to feature in both of the club's pre-season matches in March, before earning nine coaches votes as best on ground with 25 disposals and a goal in round 1's win over Carlton. The match was the first of what was to be a 17-round season, played under extraordinary conditions imposed on the league as a result of the rapid progression of the coronavirus pandemic into Australia. It was also played with quarter lengths reduced by one fifth, a measure intended to reduce the physical load on players who would be expected to play multiple matches with short breaks in the second half of the year owing to the likelihood of an extended break in play mid-season. Just three days later, the AFL Commission suspended the season for an indefinite period after multiple states enforced quarantine conditions on their borders that effectively ruled out the possibility of continuing the season as planned. Prestia contributed 17 disposals in a draw against Collingwood when the season resumed in June following an 11-week hiatus. He featured in each of the next three matches, before sustaining a serious syndesmosis ankle injury in round 5's win over Melbourne. Prestia stayed in Melbourne to undergo surgery on the ankle in the week that followed, while his teammates relocated to the Gold Coast as a result of a virus outbreak in Melbourne. In mid-July, Prestia traveled to Queensland and by the end of month he had joined his teammates after clearing the state's mandated 14-day quarantine period. Prestia spent a week in hospital and underwent surgery again in August to clear a golden staph infection in the original surgical wound, for which he would also required treatment with intravenous antibiotics and which would continue to delay his return to football. He resumed running in the first week of September and resumed skills training in the middle of that month, before being deemed fit to return in the first week of the delayed finals series at the start of October. He was among Richmond's best players with 20 disposals in a first week qualifying final loss to the Brisbane Lions, before adding one goal in a semi-final victory over St Kilda the following week. In a preliminary final win over Port Adelaide, Prestia contributed five clearances to help his side through to another AFL Grand Final. He became a three-time premiership player the following week, collecting 14 disposals and kicking two goals including the first of the match in Richmond's 31-point victory over Geelong.

==== 2021 season ====
After a two-month training period at full health, Prestia sustained a hamstring strain in mid-February that ruled him out from participating in pre-season matches. Despite the interruption, he recovered in time to feature in the club's round 1 win over Carlton, contributing 25 disposals and nine clearances. Prestia bested that output in round 2, earning seven coaches votes as second-best afield with a team-high 29 disposals, four clearances and fourt tackles. He was substituted out of the games in the first quarter of round 3's loss to Sydney, after sustaining a hamstring strain that would rule him out for at least three weeks. At the end of that period but before he could make a return, Prestia suffered a calf strain while training that would push out his return by a month. After eight weeks on the sidelines, Prestia eventually made his return to football in the club's round 11 victory over Adelaide. Prestia was later substituted out his side's round 12 win over Essendon due to hamstring tightness and despite some hope he would be fit to play the following week, he was ultimately unable to return until round 15. Despite finishing out the entirety of that round 15 loss, Prestia would sustain his third hamstring strain and fourth soft tissue injury of the year during the match and would face another four week stint on the sidelines.

== Player profile ==
Prestia plays as an inside midfielder. He is notable for his contested ball winning skill, his ability to break away from stoppages and for his defensive running ability prowess.

== Statistics ==
Updated to the end of round 22, 2026.

Legend
G	Goals	K	Kicks	D	Disposals	T	Tackles
B	Behinds	H	Handballs	M	Marks
#	Played in that season's premiership team

Season	Team	No.	Games	Totals							Averages (per game)							Votes
Season	Team	No.	Games	G	B	K	H	D	M	T	G	B	K	H	D	M	T	Votes
2011	Gold Coast	41	17	1	7	138	142	280	49	60	0.1	0.4	8.1	8.4	16.5	2.9	3.5	0
2012	Gold Coast	41	14	2	4	135	141	276	39	59	0.1	0.3	9.6	10.1	19.7	2.8	4.2	0
2013	Gold Coast	10	20	9	8	292	217	509	78	86	0.5	0.4	14.6	10.9	25.5	3.9	4.3	9
2014	Gold Coast	10	22	10	8	309	287	596	83	102	0.5	0.4	14.0	13.0	27.1	3.8	4.6	13
2015	Gold Coast	10	8	4	5	110	107	217	16	39	0.5	0.6	13.8	13.4	27.1	2.0	4.9	1
2016	Gold Coast	10	14	4	2	172	191	363	34	75	0.3	0.1	12.3	13.6	25.9	2.4	5.4	0
2017^{#}	Richmond	3	22	7	12	259	252	511	62	93	0.3	0.5	11.8	11.5	23.2	2.8	4.2	5
2018	Richmond	3	13	7	2	175	138	313	41	41	0.5	0.2	13.5	10.6	24.1	3.2	3.2	3
2019^{#}	Richmond	3	25	7	15	386	300	686	86	123	0.3	0.6	15.4	12.0	27.4	3.4	4.9	8
2020^{#}	Richmond	3	9	4	0	85	91	176	12	36	0.4	0.0	9.4	10.1	19.6	1.3	4.0	3
2021	Richmond	3	9	1	3	93	107	200	29	37	0.1	0.3	10.3	11.9	22.2	3.2	4.1	2
2022	Richmond	3	19	6	6	244	228	472	63	58	0.3	0.3	12.8	12.0	24.8	3.3	3.1	19
2023	Richmond	3	20	8	3	211	228	439	63	56	0.4	0.2	10.6	11.4	22.0	3.2	2.8	6
2024	Richmond	3	13	3	4	134	152	286	41	25	0.2	0.3	10.3	11.7	22.0	3.2	1.9	0
2025	Richmond	3	12	4	5	119	157	276	40	36	0.3	0.4	9.9	13.1	23.0	3.3	3.0	0
2026	Richmond	3	16	1	2	152	155	307	55	48	0.1	0.1	9.5	9.7	19.2	3.4	3.0	0
Career			253	78	86	3014	2893	5907	791	974	0.3	0.3	11.9	11.4	23.3	3.1	3.8	69

== Honours and achievements ==
Team

- 3× AFL premiership player (Richmond): 2017, 2019, 2020
- McClelland Trophy (Richmond): 2018

Individual

- Jack Dyer Medal: 2019
- Yiooken Award: 2022
- 2nd place Gold Coast Best & Fairest: 2013
- 3rd place Gold Coast Best & Fairest: 2014
- Gold Coast vice captain: 2014–2016
- 2× 22under22 team: 2013, 2014
- Inaugural Gold Coast AFL team: 2011

Junior

- 2× TAC Cup premiership player: 2009, 2010
- Calder Cannons Team of the First 20 Years
