= 2017 VFL season =

136th season of the Victorian Football League

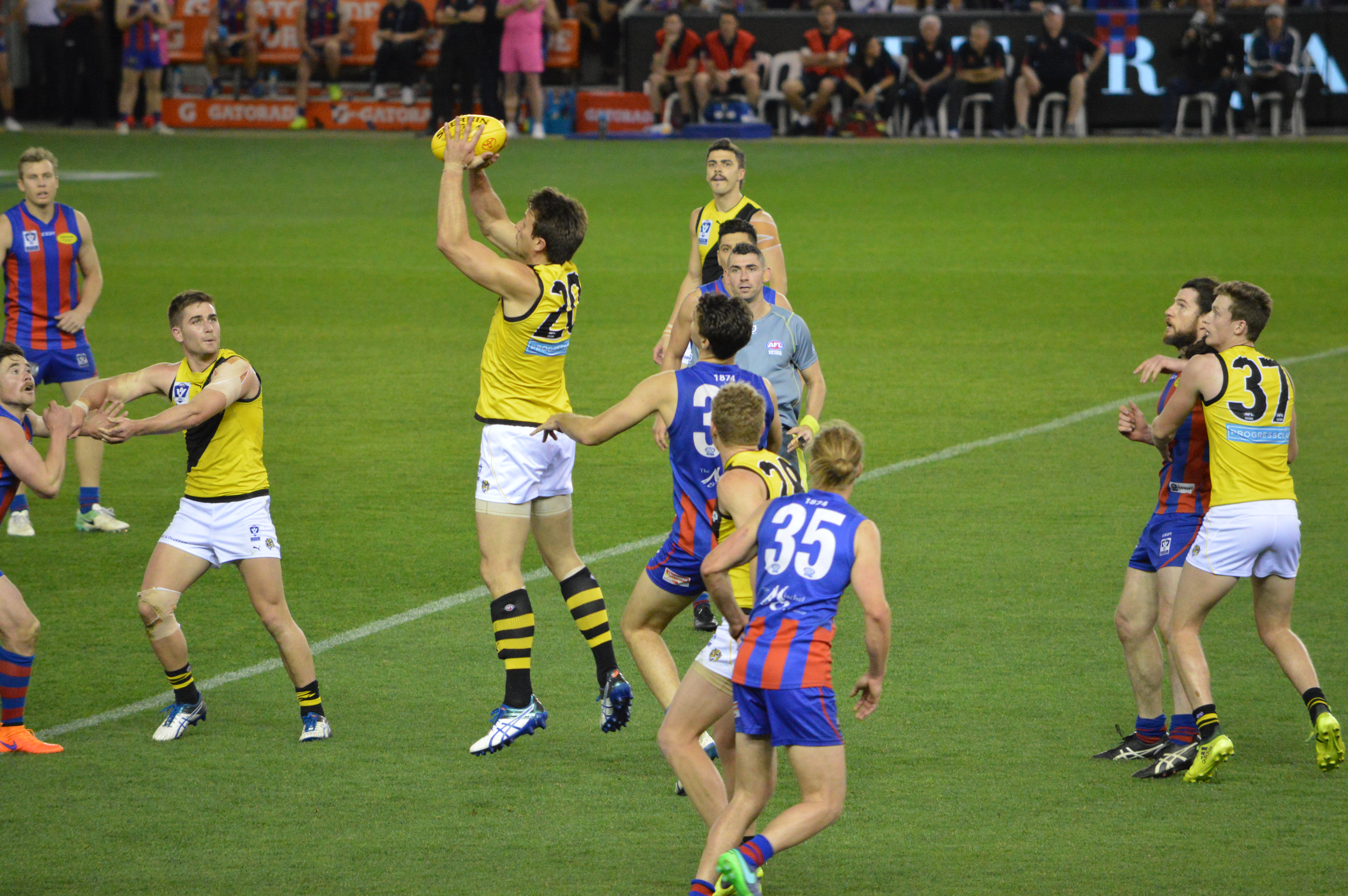
- Scenes during the 2017 VFL Grand Final
- Teams: 14
- Premiers: Port Melbourne; 17th premiership
- Minor premiers: Williamstown; 11th minor premiership
- J. J. Liston Trophy: Jacob Townsend (Richmond)
- Frosty Miller Medallist: Jordan Lisle (Port Melbourne – 46 goals)

The 2017 VFL season was the 136th season of the Victorian Football League (VFL), a second-tier Australian rules football competition played in the state of Victoria. The competition began on 8 April and concluded with the grand final on 24 September 2017.

The grand final was won by Port Melbourne, who defeated Richmond reserves by four points at Etihad Stadium.

== League membership ==
At the end of the 2016 season, AFL Victoria terminated the licence of the Frankston Football Club due to its financial position, which was no longer considered viable. The club had suffered a severe downturn in the profitability of its pokies licence over the previous few years, and by 2016 the machines were generating a loss for the club. The club terminated the pokies licence in May 2016, but by that time owed more than $1,500,000, both to the state gaming regulators and other creditors. The club went into voluntary administration in August, and the club's VFL licence was terminated the following month, in the week after the VFL Grand Final. The club's immediate existence was saved when creditors, including the gaming regulators, agreed to waive more than 90% of the club's debt, and it came out of administration in late November 2016, but was still excluded from the 2017 season. The club then embarked on a campaign to assure its long-term viability, which included signing up 1200 members and working to improve its relationship with the local leagues as a pathway for Mornington Peninsula footballers into state football. The club applied for and was re-granted its VFL licence for the 2018 season, meaning it missed only one season of football.

There had been an expectation over the previous few years that the Australian Football League's St Kilda Football Club would terminate its reserves affiliation with Sandringham at the end of the 2015 VFL season, with a plan for both clubs would go their separate ways in 2016. This led to Sandringham establishing a partnership with Victorian Amateur Football Association (VAFA) club Hampton Rovers. The affiliation with St Kilda was temporarily extended for the 2016 VFL season. However, after renegotiations throughout 2016, a new rolling affiliation deal with no fixed term was signed, to begin in 2017. The new deal changed the nature of the affiliation, expanding St Kilda's involvement in Sandringham's operation − including removing a stipulation from the previous agreement that no more than 14 St Kilda-listed players could play in Sandringham's senior team in any given match and Sandringham playing three games per year in St Kilda colours (beginning in 2018) at Moorabbin Oval, St Kilda's former home ground.

The Casey Scorpions were renamed the Casey Demons, to co-brand the club with its AFL-affiliate, Melbourne. The club changed its guernsey design to match that of the Melbourne Football Club.

== Premiership season ==
Source: VFL season 2017 Results and Fixtures

=== Round 1 ===
	Round 1
Saturday, 8 April (2:00pm)	Port Melbourne 12.15 (87)	def.	Northern Blues 8.10 (58)	North Port Oval
Friday, 14 April (12:00pm)	Footscray 14.9 (93)	def. by	Box Hill 15.5 (95)	VU Whitten Oval	Report
Saturday, 15 April (2:00pm)	Sandringham 11.12 (78)	def.	Essendon 10.11 (71)	Trevor Barker Oval	Report
Saturday, 15 April (2:40pm)	Coburg 9.8 (62)	def. by	Collingwood 9.10 (64)	Piranha Park	Report
Sunday, 16 April (12:00pm)	Richmond 33.21 (219)	def.	North Ballarat 4.7 (31)	Punt Road Oval	Report
Sunday, 16 April (2:00pm)	Werribee 10.15 (75)	def. by	Geelong 14.16 (100)	Spring Creek Reserve	Report
Monday, 17 April (2:00pm)	Williamstown 12.11 (83)	def.	Casey 8.12 (60)	Burbank Oval	Report

=== Round 2 ===
	Round 2
Saturday, 22 April (1:00pm)	Geelong 6.8 (44)	def. by	Port Melbourne 13.18 (96)	Simonds Stadium	Report
Saturday, 22 April (2:00pm)	Box Hill 20.8 (128)	def.	Coburg 9.8 (62)	Box Hill City Oval (crowd: 1,166)	Report
Saturday, 22 April (2:00pm)	Sandringham 8.13 (61)	def. by	Richmond 12.14 (86)	Trevor Barker Oval	Report
Saturday, 22 April (2:40pm)	Northern Blues 14.17 (101)	def.	Williamstown 11.14 (80)	Preston City Oval	Report
Saturday, 22 April (5:00pm)	Werribee 9.12 (66)	def. by	Footscray 17.15 (117)	VU Whitten Oval	Report
Saturday, 22 April (7:00pm)	Casey 19.13 (127)	def.	North Ballarat 12.9 (81)	Casey Fields
Sunday, 23 April (1:00pm)	Essendon 18.10 (118)	def.	Collingwood 5.8 (38)	Windy Hill	Report

=== Round 3 ===
	Round 3
Friday, 28 April (7:00pm)	Footscray 25.13 (163)	def.	North Ballarat 5.9 (39)	VU Whitten Oval	Report
Saturday, 29 April (2:00pm)	Sandringham 17.11 (113)	def.	Collingwood 12.21 (93)	Trevor Barker Oval	Report
Saturday, 29 April (2:00pm)	Werribee 14.13 (97)	def.	Essendon 9.20 (74)	Arden Street Oval	Report
Saturday, 29 April (2:00pm)	Port Melbourne 14.14 (98)	def.	Richmond 9.14 (68)	North Port Oval	Report
Saturday, 29 April (2:40pm)	Geelong 14.8 (92)	def.	Casey 8.8 (56)	Simonds Stadium	Report
Sunday, 30 April (2:00pm)	Coburg 11.13 (79)	def. by	Northern Blues 21.15 (141)	Piranha Park
Sunday, 30 April (2:00pm)	Williamstown 8.14 (62)	def. by	Box Hill 13.12 (90)	Burbank Oval	Report

=== Round 4 ===
	Round 4
Saturday, 6 May (11:00am)	Geelong 8.5 (53)	def. by	Box Hill 14.11 (95)	Simonds Stadium	Report
Saturday, 6 May (12:00pm)	Essendon 8.14 (62)	def. by	Port Melbourne 12.17 (89)	Frankston Park	Report
Saturday, 6 May (2:10pm)	Sandringham 12.6 (78)	def.	North Ballarat 9.10 (64)	Trevor Barker Oval
Saturday, 6 May (3:00pm)	Footscray 17.16 (118)	def.	Richmond 17.9 (111)	Etihad Stadium	Report
Sunday, 7 May (1:00pm)	Collingwood 6.10 (46)	def. by	Northern Blues 9.5 (59)	Victoria Park	Report
Sunday, 7 May (2:00pm)	Werribee 13.9 (87)	def.	Casey 10.14 (74)	Hogans Road Reserve	Report
Sunday, 7 May (2:00pm)	Williamstown 20.17 (137)	def.	Coburg 7.7 (49)	Burbank Oval	Report
The beginning of the third quarter of the match between Geelong and Box Hill was delayed by almost half an hour after a public address malfunction at Simonds Stadium resulted in the siren sounding continuously for fifteen minutes.

=== Round 5 ===
	Round 5
Saturday, 13 May (12:00pm)	Essendon 17.14 (116)	def.	Geelong 8.7 (55)	Windy Hill	Report
Saturday, 13 May (2:00pm)	North Ballarat 4.8 (32)	def. by	Williamstown 17.21 (123)	Eureka Stadium
Saturday, 13 May (2:10pm)	Werribee 17.10 (112)	def.	Collingwood 15.11 (101)	Norm Minns Oval	Report
Saturday, 13 May (2:10pm)	Port Melbourne 17.10 (112)	def.	Footscray 12.9 (81)	North Port Oval	Report
Sunday, 14 May (12:00pm)	Box Hill 18.8 (116)	def.	Richmond 13.16 (94)	Box Hill City Oval (crowd: 1,317)	Report
Sunday, 14 May (2:00pm)	Northern Blues 14.14 (98)	def.	Casey 6.7 (43)	Preston City Oval
Sunday, 14 May (2:00pm)	Coburg 14.5 (89)	def. by	Sandringham 15.11 (101)	Piranha Park	Report

=== Round 6 ===
	Round 6
Saturday, 20 May (1:00pm)	North Ballarat 9.13 (67)	def. by	Werribee 10.12 (72)	Eureka Stadium	Report
Saturday, 20 May (1:00pm)	Coburg 9.7 (61)	def. by	Essendon 22.18 (150)	Piranha Park	Report
Saturday, 20 May (2:00pm)	Northern Blues 17.11 (113)	def.	Sandringham 10.15 (75)	Preston City Oval
Saturday, 20 May (2:10pm)	Footscray 13.9 (87)	def. by	Geelong 14.15 (99)	VU Whitten Oval	Report
Saturday, 20 May (3:45pm)	Collingwood 11.10 (76)	def. by	Box Hill 16.6 (102)	Holden Centre	Report
Saturday, 20 May (7:00pm)	Casey 14.12 (96)	def.	Port Melbourne 8.5 (53)	Casey Fields	Report
Sunday, 21 May (2:00pm)	Williamstown 19.12 (126)	def.	Richmond 10.10 (70)	Burbank Oval	Report

=== Round 7 ===
	Round 7
Saturday, 3 June (12:00pm)	Essendon 20.17 (137)	def.	North Ballarat 15.9 (99)	Windy Hill	Report
Saturday, 3 June (1:00pm)	Richmond 10.7 (67)	def. by	Werribee 10.12 (72)	Holm Park	Report
Saturday, 3 June (2:10pm)	Port Melbourne 15.18 (108)	drew with	Box Hill 16.12 (108)	North Port Oval	Report
Sunday, 4 June (12:00pm)	Collingwood 14.8 (92)	def.	Sandringham 11.12 (78)	Victoria Park	Report
Sunday, 4 June (2:00pm)	Coburg 10.8 (68)	def. by	Casey 12.14 (86)	Piranha Park	Report
Sunday, 4 June (2:00pm)	Williamstown 15.15 (105)	def.	Geelong 7.10 (52)	Burbank Oval	Report
	Bye; Footscray, Northern Blues

=== Round 8 ===
	Round 8
Friday, 9 June (7:00pm)	Footscray 10.13 (73)	def.	Essendon 10.9 (69)	VU Whitten Oval	Report
Saturday, 10 June (11:30am)	Northern Blues 14.16 (100)	def.	Coburg 13.13 (91)	Preston City Oval	Report
Saturday, 10 June (2:00pm)	Williamstown 15.14 (104)	def.	Sandringham 12.8 (80)	Burbank Oval
Saturday, 10 June (2:10pm)	Casey 15.12 (102)	def.	Collingwood 13.5 (83)	Casey Fields	Report
Sunday, 11 June (1:00pm)	North Ballarat 11.9 (75)	def. by	Box Hill 12.16 (88)	Eureka Stadium
	Bye; Geelong, Port Melbourne, Richmond, Werribee

=== Round 9 ===
	Round 9
Saturday, 17 June (2:00pm)	Coburg 8.6 (54)	def. by	Port Melbourne 18.10 (118)	Piranha Park
Saturday, 17 June (2:10pm)	Northern Blues 15.13 (103)	def. by	Werribee 18.9 (117)	Ikon Park
Saturday, 17 June (4:30pm)	Richmond 18.18 (126)	def.	Geelong 12.5 (77)	Punt Road Oval
Saturday, 17 June (7:00pm)	Casey 10.15 (75)	def.	Footscray 9.8 (62)	Casey Fields
Sunday, 18 June (2:00pm)	Williamstown 16.22 (118)	def.	North Ballarat 9.8 (62)	Burbank Oval
	Bye; Box Hill, Collingwood, Essendon, Sandringham

=== Round 10 ===
	Round 10
Saturday, 24 June (12:00pm)	Essendon 15.7 (97)	def.	Williamstown 12.10 (82)	Windy Hill
Saturday, 24 June (2:00pm)	Sandringham 8.15 (63)	def. by	Coburg 13.10 (88)	Trevor Barker Oval
Saturday, 24 June (2:00pm)	Port Melbourne 13.9 (87)	def. by	Collingwood 19.10 (124)	North Port Oval
Saturday, 24 June (2:10pm)	Box Hill 11.7 (73)	def. by	Casey 14.15 (99)	Box Hill City Oval (crowd: 1,487)
Saturday, 24 June (2:00pm)	Footscray 13.17 (95)	def.	Werribee 10.11 (71)	VU Whitten Oval
Sunday, 25 June (12:00pm)	Richmond 16.19 (115)	def.	Northern Blues 4.7 (31)	Punt Road Oval
Sunday, 25 June (2:00pm)	North Ballarat 6.15 (51)	def. by	Geelong 15.10 (100)	Eureka Stadium

=== Round 11 ===
	Round 11
Saturday, 1 July (1:00pm)	Geelong 19.12 (126)	def.	Coburg 6.5 (41)	Simonds Stadium
Saturday, 1 July (2:00pm)	Port Melbourne 16.9 (105)	def.	Casey 5.10 (40)	North Port Oval
Saturday, 1 July (2:10pm)	Essendon 10.14 (74)	def. by	Richmond 12.8 (80)	Windy Hill
Sunday, 2 July (11:45am)	Collingwood 13.7 (85)	def.	Footscray 12.8 (80)	Victoria Park
Sunday, 2 July (2:00pm)	Northern Blues 6.19 (55)	def. by	Box Hill 11.11 (77)	Preston City Oval
Sunday, 2 July (2:00pm)	Sandringham 17.6 (108)	def.	Werribee 14.18 (102)	Trevor Barker Oval
	Bye; North Ballarat, Williamstown

=== Round 12 ===
	Round 12
Saturday, 8 July (1:00pm)	Richmond 11.10 (76)	def.	Casey 7.6 (48)	Holm Park
Saturday, 8 July (1:00pm)	Geelong 7.8 (50)	def. by	Collingwood 11.10 (76)	Simonds Stadium
Saturday, 8 July (2:00pm)	Coburg 10.9 (69)	def. by	Werribee 12.15 (87)	Piranha Park
Saturday, 8 July (2:00pm)	Northern Blues 9.9 (63)	def. by	Port Melbourne 13.8 (86)	Preston City Oval
Sunday, 9 July (1:00pm)	North Ballarat 6.10 (46)	def. by	Essendon 14.16 (100)	Mars Stadium
Sunday, 9 July (2:00pm)	Box Hill 10.13 (73)	def. by	Williamstown 17.16 (118)	Box Hill City Oval (crowd: 1,296)
Sunday, 9 July (2:00pm)	Sandringham 10.11 (71)	def. by	Footscray 18.12 (120)	Trevor Barker Oval

=== Round 13 ===
	Round 13
Saturday, 15 July (12:00pm)	Essendon 16.15 (111)	def.	Northern Blues 4.6 (30)	Windy Hill
Saturday, 15 July (1:00pm)	Collingwood 10.10 (70)	def. by	Williamstown 20.10 (130)	Victoria Park
Saturday, 15 July (2:00pm)	Port Melbourne 9.13 (67)	def. by	Sandringham 11.9 (75)	North Port Oval
Saturday, 15 July (2:00pm)	Werribee 9.7 (61)	def. by	Richmond 25.13 (163)	Frankston Park
Saturday, 15 July (7:00pm)	Geelong 6.8 (44)	def. by	Footscray 16.10 (106)	Simonds Stadium
Sunday, 16 July (12:00pm)	Box Hill 18.13 (121)	def.	North Ballarat 9.18 (72)	Box Hill City Oval (crowd: 961)
	Bye; Casey, Coburg

=== Round 14 ===
	Round 14
Saturday, 22 July (1:00pm)	Geelong 13.8 (86)	def. by	Sandringham 16.17 (113)	Simonds Stadium
Saturday, 22 July (1:00pm)	North Ballarat 11.9 (75)	def.	Northern Blues 6.13 (49)	Mars Stadium
Saturday, 22 July (1:00pm)	Footscray 18.9 (117)	def.	Coburg 8.9 (57)	VU Whitten Oval
Saturday, 22 July (2:00pm)	Port Melbourne 6.12 (48)	def. by	Williamstown 7.9 (51)	North Port Oval
Saturday, 22 July (7:00pm)	Casey 10.11 (71)	def.	Essendon 7.14 (56)	Casey Fields
Sunday, 23 July (10:20am)	Richmond 16.6 (102)	def. by	Collingwood 14.20 (104)	Punt Road Oval
Sunday, 23 July (2:00pm)	Box Hill 15.18 (108)	def.	Werribee 9.9 (63)	Box Hill City Oval (crowd: 929)

=== Round 15 ===
	Round 15
Saturday, 29 July (1:00pm)	Northern Blues 12.8 (80)	def.	Geelong 11.9 (75)	Ikon Park
Saturday, 29 July (2:00pm)	Williamstown 16.6 (102)	def.	Footscray 2.11 (23)	Burbank Oval
Sunday, 30 July (11:00am)	North Ballarat 8.13 (61)	def. by	Richmond 14.19 (103)	Mars Stadium
Sunday, 30 July (11:45am)	Collingwood 13.8 (86)	def. by	Essendon 15.10 (100)	Victoria Park
Sunday, 30 July (2:00pm)	Sandringham 14.11 (95)	def. by	Box Hill 22.10 (142)	Trevor Barker Oval
Sunday, 30 July (2:00pm)	Casey 12.14 (86)	def.	Coburg 6.7 (43)	Casey Fields
Sunday, 30 July (2:00pm)	Werribee 17.3 (105)	def.	Port Melbourne 15.11 (101)	Rams Arena

=== Round 16 ===
	Round 16
Saturday, 27 May (4:00pm)	Richmond 14.7 (91)	def.	Essendon 10.14 (74)	Punt Road Oval	Report
Saturday, 5 August (11:00am)	Northern Blues 10.7 (67)	def. by	Footscray 12.8 (80)	Ikon Park
Saturday, 5 August (1:00pm)	North Ballarat 7.6 (48)	def. by	Port Melbourne 12.19 (91)	Mars Stadium
Saturday, 5 August (2:00pm)	Box Hill 19.23 (137)	def.	Geelong 13.7 (85)	Box Hill City Oval (crowd: 1,042)
Saturday, 5 August (2:00pm)	Sandringham 12.11 (83)	def. by	Casey 14.9 (93)	Trevor Barker Oval
Saturday, 5 August (3:45pm)	Werribee 11.4 (70)	def. by	Collingwood 15.12 (102)	Etihad Stadium
Sunday, 6 August (2:00pm)	Coburg 8.6 (54)	def. by	Williamstown 16.23 (119)	Piranha Park
The Richmond vs Essendon match was played during the weekend of the interstate game.

=== Round 17 ===
	Round 17
Saturday, 27 May (7:00pm)	Footscray 19.24 (138)	def.	Sandringham 5.9 (39)	VU Whitten Oval	Report
Saturday, 12 August (10:15am)	Geelong 12.12 (84)	def.	Richmond 11.11 (77)	Simonds Stadium
Saturday, 12 August (12:00pm)	Essendon 14.5 (89)	def.	Box Hill 12.11 (83)	Windy Hill
Saturday, 12 August (2:00pm)	Port Melbourne 30.17 (197)	def.	Coburg 5.7 (37)	Fortburn Stadium
Saturday, 12 August (7:00pm)	Casey 16.6 (102)	def.	Northern Blues 8.17 (65)	Casey Fields
Sunday, 13 August (1:00pm)	Collingwood 19.14 (128)	def.	North Ballarat 6.5 (41)	Victoria Park
Sunday, 13 August (2:00pm)	Williamstown 17.15 (117)	def.	Werribee 6.10 (46)	Burbank Oval
The Footscray vs Sandringham match was played during the weekend of the interstate game.

=== Round 18 ===
	Round 18
Saturday, 19 August (10:45am)	Collingwood 9.17 (71)	def. by	Geelong 11.10 (76)	Holden Centre
Saturday, 19 August (12:00pm)	Essendon 13.10 (88)	def.	Footscray 12.11 (83)	Windy Hill
Saturday, 19 August (1:00pm)	Werribee 10.16 (76)	def. by	Northern Blues 16.9 (105)	Preston City Oval
Saturday, 19 August (2:00pm)	Coburg 16.9 (105)	def.	North Ballarat 14.9 (93)	Piranha Park
Saturday, 19 August (7:00pm)	Casey 11.12 (78)	def.	Williamstown 7.12 (54)	Casey Fields
Sunday, 20 August (12:00pm)	Richmond 22.17 (149)	def.	Sandringham 12.7 (79)	Punt Road Oval
Sunday, 20 August (2:00pm)	Box Hill 8.10 (58)	def. by	Port Melbourne 13.8 (86)	Box Hill City Oval (crowd: 1,627)

=== Round 19 ===
	Round 19
Saturday, 26 August (10:45am)	Collingwood 8.11 (59)	def. by	Port Melbourne 9.11 (65)	Holden Centre	Report
Saturday, 26 August (1:00pm)	North Ballarat 6.11 (47)	def. by	Sandringham 15.12 (102)	Mars Stadium
Saturday, 26 August (2:10pm)	Footscray 8.10 (58)	def. by	Williamstown 14.17 (101)	VU Whitten Oval	Report
Saturday, 26 August (7:00pm)	Casey 11.15 (81)	def.	Werribee 9.12 (66)	Casey Fields	Report
Sunday, 27 August (12:00pm)	Richmond 17.17 (119)	def.	Coburg 4.9 (33)	Punt Road Oval	Report
Sunday, 27 August (1:00pm)	Geelong 10.9 (69)	def.	Essendon 9.13 (67)	Simonds Stadium	Report
Sunday, 27 August (2:00pm)	Box Hill 19.13 (127)	def.	Northern Blues 7.8 (50)	Box Hill City Oval (crowd: 1,104)

== Ladder ==
Pos	Team	Pld	W	L	D	PF	PA	PP	Pts
1	Williamstown	18	14	4	0	1812	1144	158.4	56
2	Box Hill Hawks	18	13	4	1	1821	1435	126.9	54
3	Port Melbourne	18	12	5	1	1694	1231	137.6	50
4	Casey Demons	18	12	6	0	1417	1328	106.7	48
5	Richmond	18	11	7	0	1917	1348	142.2	44
6	Essendon	18	10	8	0	1653	1311	126.1	40
7	Footscray	18	10	8	0	1694	1391	121.8	40
8	Collingwood	18	8	10	0	1498	1547	96.8	32
9	Northern Blues	18	8	10	0	1368	1542	88.7	32
10	Geelong	18	8	10	0	1367	1575	86.8	32
11	Sandringham	18	8	10	0	1492	1744	85.6	32
12	Werribee	18	8	10	0	1445	1752	82.5	32
13	Coburg	18	2	16	0	1142	2032	56.2	8
14	North Ballarat	18	1	17	0	1084	2024	53.6	4

Updated to match(es) played on 27 August 2017. Source: SportsTG
Rules for classification: 1) points; 2) percentage; 3) number of points for.

== Finals series ==
Qualifying and elimination finals
2 Sep, Burbank Oval
1	Williamstown	18.10 (118)
4	Casey	11.7 (73)
2 Sep, Fortburn Stadium
5	Richmond	12.13 (85)
8	Collingwood	11.7 (73)
3 Sep, Fortburn Stadium
6	Essendon	13.13 (91)
7	Footscray	14.12 (96)
3 Sep, Box Hill City Oval
2	Box Hill	11.11 (77)
3	Port Melbourne	9.10 (64)

Semi-finals
9 Sep, Fortburn Stadium
Casey	15.11 (101)
Richmond	19.14 (128)
10 Sep, Fortburn Stadium
Port Melbourne	16.11 (107)
Footscray	12.15 (87)

Preliminary finals
17 Sep, Fortburn Stadium
Williamstown	8.11 (59)
Port Melbourne	12.10 (82)
16 Sep, Fortburn Stadium
Box Hill	8.6 (54)
Richmond	18.11 (119)

Grand final
24 Sep, Etihad Stadium
Port Melbourne	11.8 (74)
Richmond	10.10 (70)

=== Qualifying and Elimination Finals ===
	Qualifying Finals
Saturday 2 September (2:00 pm)	Williamstown 18.10 (118)	def.	Casey 11.7 (73)	Burbank Oval	Report
Sunday 3 September (2:00 pm)	Box Hill 11.11 (77)	def.	Port Melbourne 9.10 (64)	Box Hill City Oval (crowd: 2,075)	Report

	Elimination Finals
Saturday 2 September (2:40 pm)	Richmond 12.13 (85)	def.	Collingwood 11.7 (73)	Fortburn Stadium	Report
Sunday 3 September (2:40 pm)	Essendon 13.13 (91)	def. by	Footscray 14.12 (96)	Fortburn Stadium	Report

=== Semi-finals ===
	Semi-finals
Saturday 9 September (12:40 pm)	Casey 15.11 (101)	def. by	Richmond 19.14 (128)	Fortburn Stadium	Report
Sunday 10 September (2:40 pm)	Port Melbourne 16.11 (107)	def.	Footscray 12.15 (87)	Fortburn Stadium	Report

=== Preliminary Finals ===
	Preliminary Finals
Saturday 16 September (2:40 pm)	Box Hill 8.6 (54)	def. by	Richmond 18.11 (119)	Fortburn Stadium	Report
Sunday 17 September (2:40 pm)	Williamstown 8.11 (59)	def. by	Port Melbourne 12.10 (82)	Fortburn Stadium	Report

=== Grand Final ===
2017 VFL Grand Final
Sunday 24 September (3:00 pm)	Port Melbourne	def.	Richmond	Etihad Stadium (crowd: 17,159)	Report
2.2 (14); 3.5 (23); 6.6 (42); 11.8 (74)	Q1; Q2; Q3; Final	3.3 (21); 3.6 (24); 6.8 (44); 10.10 (70)	Umpires: Nick Brown, Daniel Butcher, Andre Gianfagna; Norm Goss Memorial Medal: Sam Lloyd; Television broadcast: Seven Network
3: D. Conway; 2: Cain; 1: Pinwill, Templeton, Anastasio, Sandilands, Pearson, Wooffindin	Goals	3: Griffiths; 2: Bolton, Menadue; 1: Lloyd, Lennon, Mannagh
In a close conclusion to the Grand Final, Richmond took a 13 point lead at the 20 minute mark of the final quarter, before Port Melbourne kicked three goals in time on to take a five-point lead. Richmond's Ben Lennon then had an opportunity to kick for goal after the final siren from a mark 52 metres out directly in front, but he missed to the right side.; Sam Lloyd (Richmond) was the first player from the losing team to win the Norm Goss Memorial Medal in the 35-year history of the award.

== Awards ==
- The Frosty Miller Medal was won by Jordan Lisle (Port Melbourne), who kicked 46 goals during the home-and-away season.
- The J. J. Liston Trophy was won by Jacob Townsend (Richmond reserves), who polled 18 votes. 2016 winner Michael Gibbons (Williamstown) finished second with 16 votes, and Adam Marcon (Williamstown) and Matt Hanson (Werribee) were equal third with 14 votes.
- The Fothergill–Round Medal was won by Bayley Fritsch (Casey Demons).
- The last ever Development League premiership before the reserves competition was wound up at the end of the 2017 season was won by Casey. Casey 13.16 (94) defeated Williamstown 11.16 (82) in the Grand Final, played at Fortburn Stadium on 17 September as a curtain-raiser to the seniors first preliminary final.

== Notable events ==
- Werribee's home ground, Avalon Airport Oval, was unavailable throughout the 2017 season as it was being upgraded. Rather than setting up a permanent alternative, the club played all nine of its home games at different venues, in Torquay, North Melbourne, Wangaratta, Carlton, Docklands, Frankston, Craigieburn, Hoppers Crossing and Footscray.
- After a successful two-year contract, a new two-year broadcast deal covering the 2017 and 2018 seasons was signed between the VFL and Seven Network.
- Eventual premiers Port Melbourne fell on financial hardships prior to the 2017 season, and the entire playing and coaching list forwent match payments in the club's Round 1 match.
- North Ballarat's home ground, Eureka Stadium, underwent a change in management at the start of the season when the entire precinct was compulsorily acquired by the City of Ballarat. The arena and part of the outer was already crown land, with the rest being owned on freehold title by the football club; but the council acquired the entire precinct as it needed to be upgraded for an Australian Football League game in August – the first ever to be staged at the venue – and the council did not have faith that the North Ballarat Football Club board, which had recently undergone a significant and unstable period of change, would be able to manage the works. The club received $5.5M in compensation for the acquisition and an interim lease to use the ground in the 2017 VFL season. These issues formed part of the off-field instability which saw the club's VFL licence terminated at the end of the season.
- Ron Todd, the prolific key forward who played for Collingwood in the VFL in the 1930s and Williamstown in the VFA in the 1940s, was inducted into the Australian Football Hall of Fame. He was only the second player who played the majority of his career in the VFA post-1897 to be inducted.

== See also ==
- 2017 VFL Women's season
- 2017 AFL season
