= 2014 Richmond Football Club season =

Richmond Football Club
2014 season
- President: Peggy O'Neal^{(1st season)}
- Coach: Damien Hardwick^{(5th season)}
- Captains: Trent Cotchin^{(2nd season)}
- Home ground: MCG
- Pre-season: (2-1)
- AFL season: 8th^{(12-10)}
- Finals series: 8th^{(0-1)}
- Jack Dyer Medal: Trent Cotchin
- Leading goalkicker: Jack Riewoldt^{(61)}
- Highest home attendance: 62,100^{(round 4 vs. Collingwood)}
- Lowest home attendance: 28,483^{(round 17 vs. Port Adelaide)}
- Average home attendance: 43,196^{(▼ -7,705 / ▼15.1%)}
- Club membership: 66,122^{(▲5,801 / ▲9.62%)}

The 2014 season marked the 107th season in which the Richmond Football Club participated in the AFL/VFL.

== 2013 off-season list changes ==
=== Retirements and delistings ===
Player	Reason	Club games	Career games	Ref
Shane Tuck	Retired	173	173	
Sam Lonergan	Retired	2	81	
Luke McGuane	Delisted	105	112	
Robin Nahas	Delisted	83	117	
Tom Derickx	Delisted	2	15	
Steven Verrier	Delisted	0	0	

=== Free agency ===
Date	Player	Free agent type	Former club	New club	Compensation	Ref
1 October	Matthew White	Unrestricted	Richmond	Port Adelaide	None	

Note: Compensation picks are awarded to a player's previous team by the league and not traded from the destination club

=== Trades ===
Date	Gained	Lost	Trade partner	Ref
7 October	Shaun Hampson	Pick 32	Carlton	

Note: All traded picks are indicative and do not reflect final selection position

=== National draft ===
Round	Overall pick	Player	State	Position	Team from	League from	Ref
1	12	Ben Lennon	VIC	Midfielder	Northern Knights	TAC Cup	
3	50	Nathan Gordon	NSW	Forward	North Adelaide	SANFL	
4	66	Sam Lloyd	VIC	Small Forward	Frankston	VFL	

=== Rookie draft ===
Round	Overall pick	Player	State	Position	Team from	League from	Ref
1	11	Todd Banfield	WA	Midfielder	Brisbane Lions	AFL	
2	27	Anthony Miles	VIC	Midfielder	Greater Western Sydney	AFL	
3	42	Matt Thomas	VIC	Midfielder	Port Adelaide	AFL	

== 2014 squad ==
Richmond Football Club
Senior list		Rookie list	Coaching staff
1 Chris Newman; 2 Dylan Grimes; 3 Brett Deledio (vc); 4 Dustin Martin; 5 Brandon Ellis; 6 Shaun Grigg; 7 Matt Dea; 8 Jack Riewoldt; 9 Trent Cotchin (c); 10 Shane Edwards; 11 Jake Batchelor; 12 David Astbury; 13 Ricky Petterd; 14 Bachar Houli; 15 Chris Knights; 16 Shaun Hampson; 18 Alex Rance; 20 Ivan Maric; 23 Daniel Jackson	24 Ben Griffiths; 25 Troy Chaplin; 27 Aaron Edwards; 28 Jake King; 29 Ty Vickery; 30 Reece Conca; 31 Nick Vlastuin; 32 Brad Helbig; 33 Kamdyn McIntosh; 34 Liam McBean; 35 Ben Lennon; 36 Matt McDonough; 38 Steven Morris; 39 Nathan Gordon; 41 Nathan Foley; 42 Sam Lloyd; 43 Todd Elton; 44 Matthew Arnot; 45 Brett O'Hanlon	19 Matt Thomas; 22 Todd Banfield; 26 Anthony Miles; 37 Orren Stephenson; 40 Cadeyn Williams; 48 Ben Darrou	Head coach: Damien Hardwick; Legend: (c) Captain(s); (vc) Vice-captain(s); Long-term injury list; Upgraded rookie; (B) Category B rookie; (vet) Veterans list; (ret) Retired; Updated: 18 October 2016; Source(s): Playing list, Coaching staff

== 2014 season ==
=== Pre-season ===
Match	Date	Score	Opponent	Opponent's score	Result	Home/away	Venue	Attendance
1	Friday, 14 February 7:10 pm	1.10.15 (84)	Melbourne	1.13.11 (98)	Lost by 14 points	Home	Docklands Stadium	12,024
2	Saturday, 22 February 4:40 pm	1.17.13 (134)	Collingwood	1.10.7 (76)	Won by 58 points	Away	Wangaratta Showgrounds	11,000
3	Friday, 7 March 1:00 pm	15.11 (101)	Essendon	8.8 (56)	Won by 55 points	Home	Punt Road Oval	2,100

Source:AFL

=== Home and away season ===
Round	Date	Score	Opponent	Opponent's score	Result	Home/away	Venue	Attendance	Ladder
1	Saturday, 15 March 6:55 pm	10.9 (69)	Gold Coast	12.15 (87)	Lost by 18 points	Away	Carrara Stadium	19,425	
2	Thursday, 27 March 7:45 pm	14.14 (98)	Carlton	12.14 (86)	Won by 12 points	Home	MCG	62,037	
3	Saturday, 5 April 1:45 pm	15.8 (98)	Western Bulldogs	15.10 (100)	Lost by 2 points	Away	Etihad Stadium	31,724	
4	Friday, 11 April 7:50 pm	10.12 (72)	Collingwood	16.14 (110)	Lost by 38 points	Home	MCG	62,100	
5	Thursday, 17 April 7:50 pm	15.16 (106)	Brisbane Lions	9.9 (63)	Won by 43 points	Away	The Gabba	20,676	
6	Sunday, 27 April 3:20 pm	7.10 (52)	Hawthorn	18.10 (118)	Lost by 66 points	Home	MCG	52,990	
7	Sunday, 4 May 3:20 pm	12.4 (76)	Geelong	11.15 (81)	Lost by 5 points	Away	MCG	34,377	
8	BYE								
9	Saturday, 17 May 1:40 pm	9.20 (74)	Melbourne	14.7 (91)	Lost by 17 points	Home	MCG	56,910	
10	Saturday, 24 May 1:40 pm	24.10 (154)	Greater Western Sydney	5.11 (41)	Won by 113 points	Away	Sydney Showground Stadium	8,331	
11	Saturday, 31 May 7:45 pm	7.12 (54)	Essendon	15.14 (104)	Lost by 50 points	Away	MCG	74,664	
12	Sunday, 8 June 7:10 pm	13.10 (88)	North Melbourne	17.14 (116)	Lost by 28 points	Away	Etihad Stadium	32,997	
13	Saturday, 14 June 1:45 pm	12.13 (85)	Fremantle	16.9 (105)	Lost by 20 points	Home	MCG	22,083	
14	Friday, 20 June 7:50 pm	7.9 (51)	Sydney	9.8 (62)	Lost by 11 points	Home	MCG	34,648	
15	Saturday, 28 June 2:10 pm	18.9 (117)	St Kilda	11.7 (73)	Won by 44 points	Away	Etihad Stadium	28,487	
16	Saturday, 5 July 1:45 pm	12.7 (79)	Brisbane Lions	7.12 (54)	Won by 25 points	Home	MCG	34,577	
17	Sunday, 13 July 1:10 pm	19.12 (126)	Port Adelaide	16.10 (106)	Won by 20 points	Home	Etihad Stadium	21,483	
18	Friday, 25 July 6:40 pm	8.11 (59)	West Coast	6.6 (42)	Won by 17 points	Away	Subiaco Oval	32,270	
19	Saturday, 2 August 4:40 pm	13.11 (89)	Greater Western Sydney	8.14 (62)	Won by 27 points	Home	MCG	23,095	
20	Friday, 8 August 7:50 pm	14.11 (95)	Essendon	11.11 (77)	Won by 18 points	Home	MCG	58,032	
21	Saturday, 16 August 7:10m	10.19 (75)	Adelaide	9.15 (69)	Won by 10 points	Away	Adelaide Oval	50,459	
22	Sunday, 24 August 4:40 pm	15.8 (98)	St Kilda	10.12 (72)	Won by 26 points	Home	MCG	47,200	
23	Saturday, 30 August 4:40 pm	10.8 (68)	Sydney	9.11 (65)	Won by 3 points	Away	Stadium Australia	31,227	

Source: AFL Tables

=== Finals ===
Match	Date	Score	Opponent	Opponent's Score	Result	Home/Away	Venue	Attendance
Elimination Final	Sunday, 7 September 2:50 pm	11.9 (75)	Port Adelaide	20.12 (132)	Lost by 57 points	Away	Adelaide Oval	49,886

Source: AFL Tables

== Ladder ==
2014 AFL ladder
Pos	Team	Pld	W	L	D	PF	PA	PP	Pts	
1	Sydney	22	17	5	0	2126	1488	142.9	68	Finals series
2	Hawthorn (P)	22	17	5	0	2458	1746	140.8	68	Finals series
3	Geelong	22	17	5	0	2033	1787	113.8	68	Finals series
4	Fremantle	22	16	6	0	2029	1556	130.4	64	Finals series
5	Port Adelaide	22	14	8	0	2180	1678	129.9	56	Finals series
6	North Melbourne	22	14	8	0	2026	1731	117.0	56	Finals series
7	Essendon	22	12	9	1	1828	1719	106.3	50	Finals series
8	Richmond	22	12	10	0	1887	1784	105.8	48	Finals series
9	West Coast	22	11	11	0	2045	1750	116.9	44	
10	Adelaide	22	11	11	0	2175	1907	114.1	44	
11	Collingwood	22	11	11	0	1766	1876	94.1	44	
12	Gold Coast	22	10	12	0	1917	2045	93.7	40	
13	Carlton	22	7	14	1	1891	2107	89.7	30	
14	Western Bulldogs	22	7	15	0	1784	2177	81.9	28	
15	Brisbane Lions	22	7	15	0	1532	2212	69.3	28	
16	Greater Western Sydney	22	6	16	0	1780	2320	76.7	24	
17	Melbourne	22	4	18	0	1336	1954	68.4	16	
18	St Kilda	22	4	18	0	1480	2436	60.8	16	

Source: AFL Tables
Rules for classification: 1) points; 2) percentage; 3) number of points for.
(P) Premiers

== Awards ==
=== League awards ===
==== All-Australian team ====
	Player	Position	Appearance
Named	Alex Rance	Centre half back	1st
Nominated	Dustin Martin	-	-
Nominated	Brandon Ellis	-	-

==== 22 Under 22 team ====
	Player	Position	Appearance
Named	Brandon Ellis	Bench	2nd

==== Brownlow Medal tally ====
Player	3 vote games	2 vote games	1 vote games	Total votes	Place
Trent Cotchin	3	3	3	18	10th
Dustin Martin	0	5	3	13	20th
Brett Deledio	2	2	2	12	26th
Brandon Ellis	2	1	1	9	39th
Anthony Miles	0	1	2	4	96th
Alex Rance	0	1	1	3	113th
Reece Conca	0	2	0	2	137th
Ty Vickery	0	0	1	1	165th
Total	21	30	13	64	-

=== Club awards ===
==== Jack Dyer Medal ====
Position	Player	Votes	Medal
1st	Trent Cotchin	292	Jack Dyer Medal
2nd	Brandon Ellis	283	Jack Titus Medal
3rd	Dustin Martin	266	Maurie Fleming Medal
4th	Shane Edwards	258	Fred Swift Medal
5th	Jack Riewoldt	253	Kevin Bartlett Medal
6th	Troy Chaplin	238	
7th	Brett Deledio	230	
7th	Alex Rance	230	
9th	Bachar Houli	228	
10th	Steven Morris	197	

==== Michael Roach Medal ====
Position	Player	Goals
1st	Jack Riewoldt	61
2nd	Dustin Martin	27
3rd	Ty Vickery	23
4th	Shane Edwards	22
5th	Brett Deledio	20

== Reserves ==
In 2014 Richmond broke away from their affiliated status with Coburg to field a stand-alone reserves side for the first time in over a decade. The team competed in the VFL and played home games at the club's Punt Road home. Richmond senior and rookie-listed players who were not selected to play in the AFL side were eligible to play for the team alongside a small squad of VFL-only listed players. The team finished 12th out of 16 participating clubs, with a record of 6 wins, one draw and 11 losses.
