= Hat-trick (cricket) =

Terminology in cricket for the dismissal of three batsmen from three consecutive balls

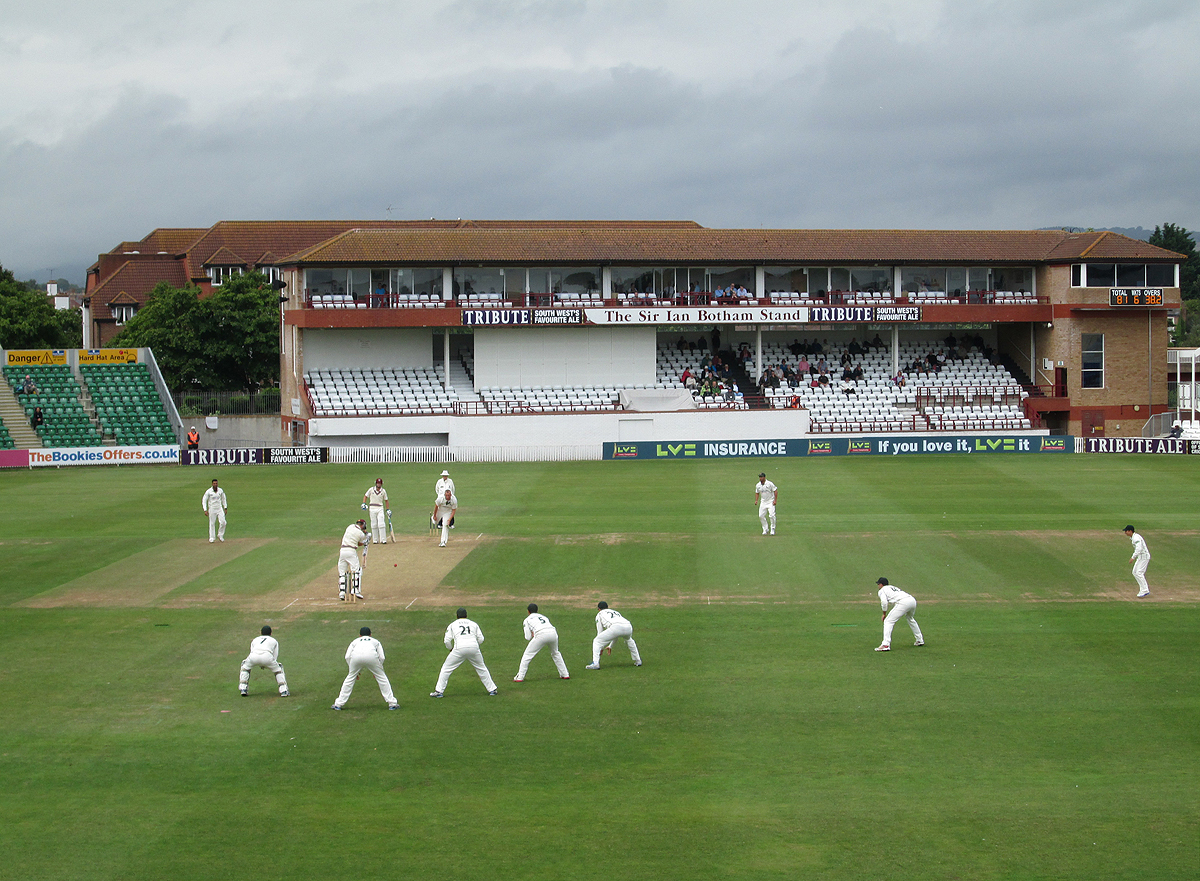
Somerset batsman Craig Meschede faces a hat-trick ball from Nottinghamshire's Luke Fletcher during the 2013 County Championship.

In cricket, a hat-trick occurs when a bowler takes three wickets from three consecutive deliveries. The deliveries may be interrupted by an over bowled by another bowler from the other end of the pitch or the other team's innings, but must be three consecutive deliveries by the individual bowler in the same match. Only wickets attributed to the bowler count towards a hat-trick; run outs do not count, although they can contribute towards a so-called team hat-trick, which is ostensibly a normal hat-trick except that the three successive deliveries can be wickets from any bowler in the team and with any mode of dismissal.

Hat-tricks are rare, and as such are treasured by bowlers.

The term is also sometimes used to mean winning the same competition three times in a row. For example, Australia winning the Cricket World Cup in 1999, 2003 and 2007, and Lancashire winning the County Championship in 1926, 1927 and 1928.

== Test cricket ==
In Test cricket history there have been just 49 hat-tricks, the first achieved by Fred Spofforth for Australia against England in 1879. In 1912, Australian Jimmy Matthews achieved the feat twice in one game against South Africa. The only other players to achieve two hat-tricks are Australia's Hugh Trumble, against England in 1902 and 1904, Pakistan's Wasim Akram, in separate games against Sri Lanka in 1999, and England's Stuart Broad in 2011 and 2014.

Nuwan Zoysa of Sri Lanka is the First bowler to achieve a hat-trick with his first three balls in a Test, against Zimbabwe in 1999. Irfan Pathan of India achieved a hat-trick in the first over of a Test match against Pakistan.

Australian fast bowler Peter Siddle took a hat-trick in an Ashes Test match against England on 25 November 2010, Siddle's 26th birthday.

== One Day Internationals ==
In One Day International cricket there have been 52 hat-tricks, the first by Jalal-ud-Din for Pakistan against Australia in 1982, and the most recent player to achieve this feat is Dilshan Madushanka of Sri Lanka against Zimbabwe in August 2025.

Sri Lanka's Lasith Malinga is the only bowler to take three hat-tricks in a single form of international cricket with his three in ODIs. Four players have taken at least two ODI hat-tricks in their careers: Wasim Akram and Saqlain Mushtaq of Pakistan, Chaminda Vaas of Sri Lanka and Kuldeep Yadav of India. (Akram therefore has four international hat-tricks in total).

Chaminda Vaas is the only player to achieve a hat-trick with the first three deliveries in a One Day International, against Bangladesh in the tenth match of 2003 ICC World Cup at City Oval, Pietermaritzburg. He also took a fourth wicket with the fifth ball of the same over, just missing the double hat-trick (read the section "More than three dismissals" below for more information).

== T20 Internationals ==
As of October 2026, there have been 97 hat-tricks in T20Is.

The first Twenty20 hat-trick was taken by Brett Lee of Australia, playing against Bangladesh in Cape Town in September 2007.

Rashid Khan, Lasith Malinga, Curtis Campher, Jason Holder, Waseem Yaqoob, and Hernán Fennell are the only bowlers to take four wickets in four balls in T20Is. Khan achieved this feat against Ireland in February 2019. Malinga repeated the achievement against New Zealand in September 2019. On 18 October 2021 at the 2021 ICC Men's T20 World Cup, Campher achieved this feat against the Netherlands. On 30 January 2022, Holder achieved this feat against England.

On 6 August 2021, Nathan Ellis picked up three wickets off the last three balls of Bangladesh innings to become the first male cricketer to take a hat-trick on his debut in a T20I match.

== Unusual hat-tricks ==
Some hat-tricks are particularly extraordinary. On 2 December 1988, Merv Hughes, playing for Australia, dismissed Curtly Ambrose with the last ball of his penultimate over and Patrick Patterson with the first ball of his next over, wrapping up the West Indies first innings. When Hughes returned to bowl in the West Indies second innings, he trapped Gordon Greenidge lbw with his first ball, completing a hat-trick over two different innings and becoming the only player in Test cricket history to achieve the three wickets of a hat-trick in three different overs.

In 1844, underarm bowler William Clarke, playing for "England" against Kent, achieved a hat-trick spread over two innings, dismissing Kent batsman John Fagge twice within the hat-trick. Fagge batted at number 11 in the first innings and at number 3 in the second.

The most involved hat-trick was perhaps when Melbourne club cricketer Stephen Hickman, playing for Power House in March 2002, achieved a hat-trick spread over three overs, two days, two innings, involving the same batsman twice, and observed by the same non-striker, with the hat-trick ball being bowled from the opposite end to the first two. In the Mercantile Cricket Association C-Grade semi-final at Fawkner Park, South Yarra, Gunbower United Cricket Club were 8 for 109 when Hickman came on to bowl his off spin. He took a wicket with the last ball of his third over and then bowled number 11 batsman Richard Higgins with the first ball of his next over to complete the Gunbower innings, leaving Chris Taylor the not out batsman. Power House scored 361, putting the game out of reach of Gunbower. In the second innings, opener Taylor was joined by Higgins at the fall of the fourth wicket as Hickman returned to the attack. With his first ball, observed by an incredulous Taylor at the non-striker's end, he clean bowled Higgins, leaving Higgins with a pair of golden ducks.

Jackie McGlew had a career best bowling of 2/4 in first class cricket yet took a hat-trick. This happened because his hat-trick, for Natal v Transvaal, Durban, 1963-64, was split across two innings and he never took three wickets in the same innings.

== More than three dismissals ==
=== Four wickets in four balls ===
The feat of taking four wickets in four balls has never occurred in Test cricket, and only once in One Day International cricket, in the 2007 World Cup, when Sri Lankan fast bowler Lasith Malinga managed the feat against South Africa. Malinga then repeated this triumph in a T20I against New Zealand during their 2019 tour of Sri Lanka. Afghanistan's Rashid Khan, Ireland's Curtis Campher and West Indian Jason Holder took four wickets in four balls in T20Is, against Ireland, Netherlands and England respectively. It has also occurred on other occasions in first-class cricket. Kevan James of Hampshire took four wickets in four balls and scored a century in the same county game against India in 1996. The Cricinfo report on the game claimed that this was unique in cricket. It is sometimes claimed that the first cricketer to achieve this feat was Joseph Wells (father of novelist H. G. Wells): in 1862 he dismissed Sussex's James Dean, Spencer Leigh, Charles Ellis and Richard Fillery with successive balls. (Spencer Leigh was the great-nephew of Jane Austen.)

Taking two wickets in two consecutive deliveries is occasionally known as a brace, or, more commonly, especially until the next delivery has been made, being "on a hat-trick". In Australia, four wickets in four balls is sometimes referred to as a double hat-trick on the basis that there are two ways of compiling the three-in-three sequence (i.e. wickets 1,2 and 3 or wickets 2,3 and 4). However, this is not an officially accepted definition.

=== Five wickets in five balls ===
Five wickets in five balls has been achieved only once in first class cricket, by New Zealand bowler Brett Randell for Central Districts against Northern Districts in a Plunket Shield match on 8 March 2026.

In other levels of cricket:

- For Gloucestershire against Yorkshire in 1922, Charlie Parker had a hat-trick that was nearly five wickets in five balls: he actually struck the stumps with five successive deliveries, but the second was a no-ball.
- Five wickets in five balls was achieved by Scott Babot of Wainuiomata Cricket Club playing in the Senior 3 competition in New Zealand in 2008; it happened across two innings and separated by seven days, as the match took place on consecutive Saturdays.
- During Brazil's national T20 in 2017, Carioca Cricket Club's off-spinner Rafi ur Rahman took 5 wickets with 5 consecutive balls. The feat came against Brasilia Federal District when the unorthodox off spinner claimed a leg before, two players clean bowled and two caught. The moment was declared "Best of the year" in the 2017 national awards by the club.
- Kelis Ndhlovu took five wickets in five balls for the Zimbabwe women's national under-19 cricket team in the domestic women's T20 competition on 29 August 2024.
- Curtis Campher for his Munster Reds's 100-run Inter-Provincial T20 Trophy win over the North West Warriors in Dublin on 11 July 2025 took five wickets in five balls becoming the first male cricketer to do so in a professional game.

=== Six wickets in six balls ===
A 'perfect over' of 6 wickets taken with 6 consecutive balls was achieved by Australian Aled Carey on 21 January 2017 while bowling for Golden Point Cricket Club against East Ballarat Cricket Club in the Ballarat Cricket Association competition. This very rare feat consisted of 2 catches, an LBW and 3 bowled.

This feat was also achieved by Matt Rowe, aged 17, playing for Palmerston North Boys' High School 1st XI on 22 March 2023 in a match against Rotorua Boys' High School in Tauranga, New Zealand. Rowe's first delivery of the 'perfect over' netted a catch in the slips, followed by 4 clean-bowled and the 6th LBW. Rowe finished with bowling figures of 9 for 12 and PNBHS subsequently chased the total of 26 in 2.1 overs.

=== Two hat-tricks in the same innings ===
Albert Trott and Joginder Rao are the only known bowlers credited with two hat-tricks in the same innings in first-class cricket (double hat-tricks notwithstanding). One of Trott's two hat-tricks, for Middlesex against Somerset at Lords in 1907, was a four in four (i.e. a double hat-trick). Similarly, there are at least two known instances of first-class hat-tricks from two innings in the same match. Amin Lakhani achieved this feat for the Combined XI side against India in Multan in 1979, while Mitchell Starc's hat-tricks occurred in 2017 in a Sheffield Shield clash between New South Wales and Western Australia.

== Three dismissals by fielders ==
There are very few cases of a fielder or wicket keeper taking a hat-trick of dismissals off consecutive deliveries in first-class cricket, and none in international cricket. The first such instance is the only known hat-trick of stumpings by a wicket-keeper: W. H. Brain for Gloucestershire against Somerset in 1893, all off the bowling of C. L. Townsend. There has never been a first-class wicket-keeping hat-trick that mixes catches and stumpings, but four other wicket-keepers have taken a hat-trick of catches: KR Meherhomji for Railways vs Freelooters at Secunderabad (the only instance outside England) in 1931, GO Dawkes for Derbyshire vs Worcestershire at Kidderminster in 1958, Jack Russell for Gloucestershire against Surrey at The Oval in 1986, and T Frost for Warwickshire against Surrey at Edgbaston in 2003. (In Russell and Frost's cases, no bowler took a hat-trick, since their catches were taken off different bowlers in successive overs: Meherhomji's and Dawkes's feats were hat-tricks for the bowlers as well, L Ramji and HL Jackson.) There are only two recorded cases of a hat-trick of catches being recorded by a non-wicket-keeper, both of which were also hat-tricks for the bowler as well: GJ Thompson, for Northants against Warwickshire at Edgbaston in 2014 (all off SG Smith), and Marcus Trescothick for Somerset against Notts in 2018 at Trent Bridge (all off Craig Overton). Trescothick – though more famous as a batsman and only an occasional bowler – has also taken a hat-trick as a bowler, in 1995 against the Young Australians. On 13th April 2025, the Mumbai Indians of the IPL recorded 3 successive run-outs against the Delhi Capitals. The sequence consisted of two throws from deep collected by the keeper and the third a direct hit from inside the circle, leading to the eight, ninth and tenth wickets.

== See also ==
- List of Test cricket hat-tricks
- List of One Day International cricket hat-tricks
- List of Twenty20 International cricket hat-tricks
- List of first-class cricket records#Hat-tricks
- List of women's international cricket hat-tricks
- Hat-trick
