= Robin Nahas =

Australian rules footballer (born 1987)

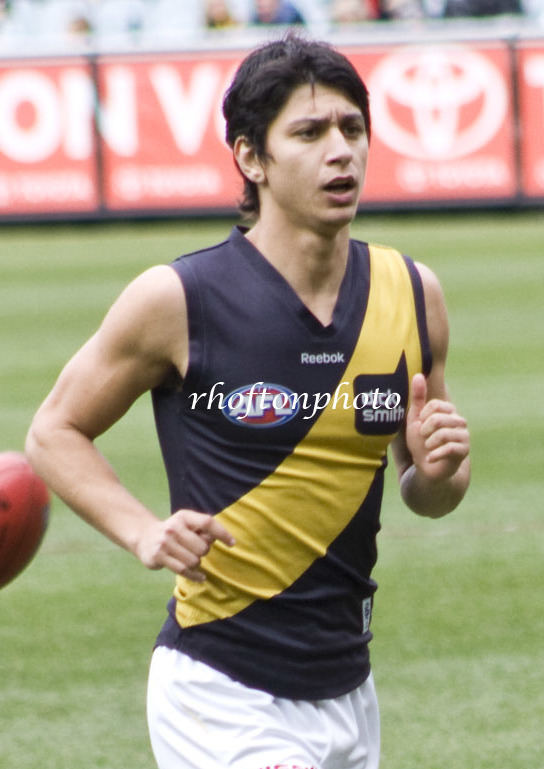
- Nahas with Richmond in August

Personal information
- Full name: Robin Nahas
- Born: 10 November 1987 (age 38)
- Original teams: Oakleigh Dragons (SMJFL); Oakleigh Chargers (TAC Cup); Port Melbourne (VFL)
- Draft: #8, 2009 Rookie Draft, Richmond #89 (RP), 2009 National Draft, Richmond
- Height: 176 cm (5 ft 9 in)
- Weight: 73 kg (161 lb)
- Position: Forward

Playing career^{1}
Years	Club	Games (Goals)
2009–2013	Richmond	83 (100)
2014–2016	North Melbourne	34 (35)
Total		117 (135)

International team honours^{2}
Years	Team	Games (Goals)
2011	Australia	1 (1)
- ^{1} Playing statistics correct to the end of 2016.^{2} Representative statistics correct as of 2011.

Career highlights
- VFL premiership player: 2017; Fothergill–Round–Mitchell Medal: 2008

Robin Nahas (born 10 November 1987) is a professional Australian rules footballer who played for the Richmond Football Club and the North Melbourne Football Club in the Australian Football League (AFL).

== Early career ==
Nahas played his junior football with the Oakleigh Dragons Football Club which is located in Oakleigh South and competed in the Moorabbin Saints Junior Football League (MSJFL), he then went on to play for the Oakleigh Chargers in the TAC Cup. In 2006 Nahas joined the Port Melbourne Football Club in the Victorian Football League (VFL) and he spent three seasons at the club. Prior to being drafted, Robin won the 2008 Fothergill–Round Medal, awarded to the most promising young talent in the VFL. Nahas is known for his exceptional pace and ferocious tackling, despite his small size, being 176 cm tall. At the time of the draft, Nahas weighed in at 60 kg before increasing his weight during pre-season with Richmond.

== AFL career ==
In 2009, Nahas was selected with pick number 8 in the 2009 Rookie Draft by Richmond.

=== Richmond ===
He made his AFL debut in round 2, 2009, replacing captain Kane Johnson, who was placed on the long-term injury list with a knee injury. Nahas had an impressive first year with the Tigers, which was capped off with him claiming the "best first-year player" award at the Richmond best-and-fairest presentation. Nahas kicked 5 goals against Port Adelaide in his 6th game, earning 2 Brownlow votes, and also won a Brownlow vote for a 19-disposal, 4-goal game against the Crows in Round 14.

Nahas played 14 games in 2010, dropped after the first two games for a lack of defensive pressure. He returned to the side in round 5 but had a moderate season overall, as did many Richmond players in Damien Hardwick's first year in charge. 2011 was a break-out year for Nahas, he played every game and performed well in a more midfield-oriented role, in addition to stints in attack. Nahas averaged 19 disposals per game and kicked 29 goals for the season, fourth-highest for the club and tied for sixth in the Jack Dyer Medal. He was offered a two-year contract at the end of the year and was also selected in the Australian International Rules squad, scoring an 'over' in the First Test. In 2012 Nahas again played every game but was a little inconsistent. He kicked 34 goals for the season, an improvement on the previous year and second-best for the club, but his disposals-per-game was down with an average of 13.5. Nahas struggled in 2013, with increased competition for his spot in the side. Dropped following the opening game against Carlton where he managed just 3 touches, Nahas played only 6 games for the year. At the end of the season Nahas was told Richmond would not be offering him a new contract. Richmond delisted Nahas in late October 2013 but he was signed by North Melbourne a few weeks later, as a delisted free agent.

=== North Melbourne ===
Nahas made his debut for North Melbourne in round 4 against the Sydney Swans at the SCG. He was a late replacement for second ruck man Daniel Currie who was omitted due to the wet weather. He did not make the squad for the subsequent game against Collingwood but returned for North Melbourne's away win against Fremantle. In Round 12 he played his first game against old club Richmond. On 31 October 2014, it was announced that Nahas had been delisted by North Melbourne. Nahas was rookied by North Melbourne in the 2015 AFL Rookie Draft and played 18 games in 2015, including his 100th AFL game against the West Coast Eagles in round 10. At the conclusion of the 2016 season, he was delisted by North Melbourne after playing only eight games and kicking four goals during the year.

== VFL career ==
=== Port Melbourne ===
After being delisted by North Melbourne, Nahas returned to Port Melbourne for the 2017 VFL season, also being appointed as the forward coach. He was allocated the number 28, and was key contributor to the teams premiership victory in 2017. Nahas retired from VFL football at the end of 2018, having played a total of 93 senior games for the club spanning a total of five seasons.

== Statistics ==
Legend
G	Goals	K	Kicks	D	Disposals	T	Tackles
B	Behinds	H	Handballs	M	Marks

Season	Team	No.	Games	Totals							Averages (per game)						
Season	Team	No.	Games	G	B	K	H	D	M	T	G	B	K	H	D	M	T
2009	Richmond	38	19	21	21	162	105	267	75	75	1.1	1.1	8.5	5.5	14.1	3.9	3.9
2010	Richmond	26	14	13	13	85	90	175	41	64	0.9	0.9	6.1	6.4	12.5	2.9	4.6
2011	Richmond	26	22	29	11	212	209	421	89	94	1.3	0.5	9.6	9.5	19.1	4.0	4.3
2012	Richmond	26	22	34	17	170	126	296	58	83	1.5	0.8	7.7	5.7	13.5	2.6	3.8
2013	Richmond	26	6	3	1	28	19	47	16	11	0.5	0.2	4.7	3.2	7.8	2.7	1.8
2014	North Melbourne	28	8	7	9	68	44	112	34	29	0.9	1.1	8.5	5.5	14.0	4.3	3.6
2015	North Melbourne	28	18	24	9	139	106	245	67	57	1.3	0.5	7.7	5.9	13.6	3.7	3.2
2016	North Melbourne	28	8	4	9	43	30	73	19	27	0.5	1.1	5.4	3.8	9.1	2.4	3.4
Career			117	135	90	907	729	1636	399	440	1.2	0.8	7.8	6.2	14.0	3.4	3.8

== Personal life ==
Nahas was born in Australia to Lebanese parents. He attended Salesian College in Chadstone. In January 2013 Nahas was involved in an incident where he chased down and detained a bag-snatcher in Prahran.
