= Eureka Stadium =

Sports stadium in Victoria, Australia

- Interactive map of Eureka Stadium
- Former names: Northern Oval #1; AUSTAR Arena
- Address: Midland Highway; Wendouree, Victoria
- Coordinates: 37°32′22″S 143°50′53″E
- Owner: City of Ballarat
- Operator: City of Ballarat
- Seating type: Individual
- Capacity: 11,000 (10,000 seated)
- Record attendance: 10,412 (23 April 2022)
- Field size: 160 metres × 129 metres
- Public transit: Bus CDC Route 30 and CDC Route 12

Construction
- Groundbreaking: 1990; 36 years ago
- Opened: 1990; 36 years ago
- Renovated: 2016–17, 2020–21, 2025–26
- Expanded: 2017
- Cost: $21.976 million (AUD) (Stage 1); $6.35 million (AUD) (Stage 2); $80 million (AUD) (Stage 3)
- Architects: Stages 1 and 2 Peddle Thorp (Melbourne); Stage 3 Cox Architecture and Morton Dunn
- Builders: Stage 1 - AW Nicholson Constructions; Stage 3 - Kane Constructions and AW Nicholson Constructions

Tenants
- North Ballarat Football Club (VFL/BFL) (1990–); GWV Rebels (Victorian State Football League U18s/TAC Cup/NAB League/Talent League/TAC Cup Girls/NAB League Girls/Talent League Girls) (1993–); North Ballarat Cricket Club (BCA) (1993–); Western Bulldogs (AFL) (2017–); Western Bulldogs (AFLW) (2022-); GWS Giants (AFL) (2021); Western United FC (A-League Men) (2019-2024); Melbourne Storm (NRL) (Trial 2022); Melbourne Rebels (Super Rugby Pacific) (2020) /Trial (2019)

Eureka Stadium (known under naming rights as Mars Stadium) is an Australian rules football and cricket stadium located in the Victorian suburb of Wendouree, 2.9 km (1.8 mi) north of the Ballarat city centre. It is part of the Eureka Sports Precinct.

As of 2026, Eureka Stadium is the home of the North Ballarat Football Club in the Ballarat Football Netball League (BFNL) and the North Ballarat Cricket Club in the Ballarat Cricket Association (BCA). The Western Bulldogs have also hosted Australian Football League (AFL) and AFL Women's (AFLW) matches at the ground since 2017.

== History ==
The first permanent oval used by the North Ballarat Football Club was established in 1963 in the centre of the defunct Ballarat Showgrounds harness racing track formerly used by the Ballarat and District Trotting Club as its main venue between 1952 and 1966. A new all-weather oval (dimensions 170 by 140 metres (560 ft × 460 ft)) replaced the harness racing track in 1990, complemented by a new sports club and club pavilion (The North Ballarat Sports Club) which was constructed on private land to the oval's northern flank.

Between 1990 and 2015 the oval was used for a range of purposes although mainly as an Australian rules football and cricket venue. It annually hosted the Ballarat Gift (Athletics Carnival) and the Ballarat Agricultural and Pastoral Society's show-ring events during their annual Show.

During the 1990s and early 2000s various proposals to play AFL football at the ground had been discussed by the Ballarat football community, media, and business groups in isolation. However, in 2008 a proposal to develop the stadium for use by AFL team North Melbourne and the North Ballarat VFL team was put forward to the Victorian State Government by the Ballarat Council and the North Ballarat Sports Club. The proposal received support from the ALP Government during the 2010 state election with the LNP opposition only providing conditional support. After the election the new LNP Government quickly abandoned the proposal. The Ballarat Council, media, sports groups, tourism and business groups continued a united lobby under a promotional campaign titled "Think Big Ballarat" until the 2014 state election when the ALP State Opposition announced that they would fund the development as an AFL Level 3 stadium with the first AFL seasonal game to be played from 2017 if elected. Once elected, the new ALP government immediately committed funding in the 2015 State Budget allowing the first stage of development of the stadium to commence.

In order to accommodate grandstands and other facilities the oval was completely rebuilt and re-oriented to a NE-SW axis in preparation for the first stage of construction. The rebuilt oval incorporated state of the art irrigation and drainage, a 4000-capacity grassed spectator berm on its south-eastern flank, and four 37 metres (121 ft) light towers partially rigged to illuminate the playing arena to 300 lux (sufficient for non-televised State level Australian Football night competition).

From April 2017 to June 2018 the City of Ballarat and North Ballarat Sports Club negotiated for Council to purchase the club's freehold land title to ensure that the newly built stadium and existing sports club would be co-developed and future-managed as a singular entity. In June 2017 naming rights for the venue were granted to Mars Confectionery Australian division.

The facility today remains the home of the North Ballarat Sports Club including the Greater Western Victoria Rebels of the Talent League and the North Ballarat City FC of the Ballarat Football League. It is also used as a venue for Central Highlands Football League and Ballarat Football League for both seasonal games and finals in addition to hosting two AFL and one AFLW seasonal games per-year since 2017.

== Sports played at Eureka Stadium ==
=== Australian rules football ===
In 2006 Australian Football League (AFL) club North Melbourne established a successful partnership with the North Ballarat Football Club to enable its reserve-grade players to play alongside the North Ballarat players in the Victorian Football League. North Melbourne also played pre-season games in at the ground during this time. In 2014 the Victorian Government and AFL approved the request of fellow AFL club the Western Bulldogs at least two AFL premiership matches at the ground from 2017, though without an affiliation with North Ballarat as North Melbourne had. In 2015 North Melbourne was forced to cease its association with Ballarat and were subsequently contracted to playing three of their seasonal AFL premiership matches in Hobart, Tasmania.

In August 2017, the Bulldogs hosted the first AFL match for premiership points at Mars Stadium against Port Adelaide, with the latter winning the match by 17 points. The Bulldogs have also played pre-season and regular-season AFL men's and AFL Women's games at the ground. In November 2021, the Western Bulldogs and the Ballarat Council announced that the club would continue playing two AFL and one AFLW home games per season. The deal was later extended for a further three seasons to the end of the 2027 season.

In July 2021, the stadium hosted the Round 17 AFL match between the GWS Giants and the Gold Coast Suns that was originally scheduled to be held in Sydney when a COVID-19 outbreak in New South Wales necessitated a last-minute change of venue.

=== Association football ===
The stadium hosted the association football (soccer) A-League club Western United FC who played 3-4 Victorian home game fixtures each year in between 2019 and 2024. The first game was played against Wellington Phoenix on 28 December 2019 with the Phoenix winning the match 3–1 in front of 5,084 fans. This arrangement ceased when a new dedicated home soccer stadium opened in Tarneit in Western Melbourne. In October 2020 A-League players voted Eureka Stadium as having equal to or the best surface of all A-League venues for that year.

=== Cricket ===
From 1990 to 2015 the main oval hosted Ballarat Cricket Association matches with the individual highest batting score on the ground (226 runs) being accredited to Mr Tom MacDonald (of the Wendouree Cricket Club) on the 18th February 2006 against the North Ballarat Cricket Club. The main oval has not been used for cricket since redevelopment in 2016, however provision was included with its reconstruction to permit the use of drop in wickets to be installed if the venue hosts future large scale cricket games. The Ballarat North Cricket Club currently play home games at the Frank Bourke Oval (Also referred to as the Number 2 Oval) adjacent to the stadium, while First Class cricket matches in Ballarat are generally hosted at the smaller historic Eastern Oval which has recently undergone a series of Cricket Australia First Grade endorsed upgrades.

=== Rugby union and rugby league ===
The stadium successfully hosted Melbourne Rebels Super Rugby AU pre-seasonal and seasonal games against Queensland Reds and the Durban Sharks during 2019 and 2020 respectively, and Melbourne Storm and Newcastle Knights of the Australian National Rugby League in February 2022 in a pre-season trial game before 5,127 fans.

== Redevelopments ==
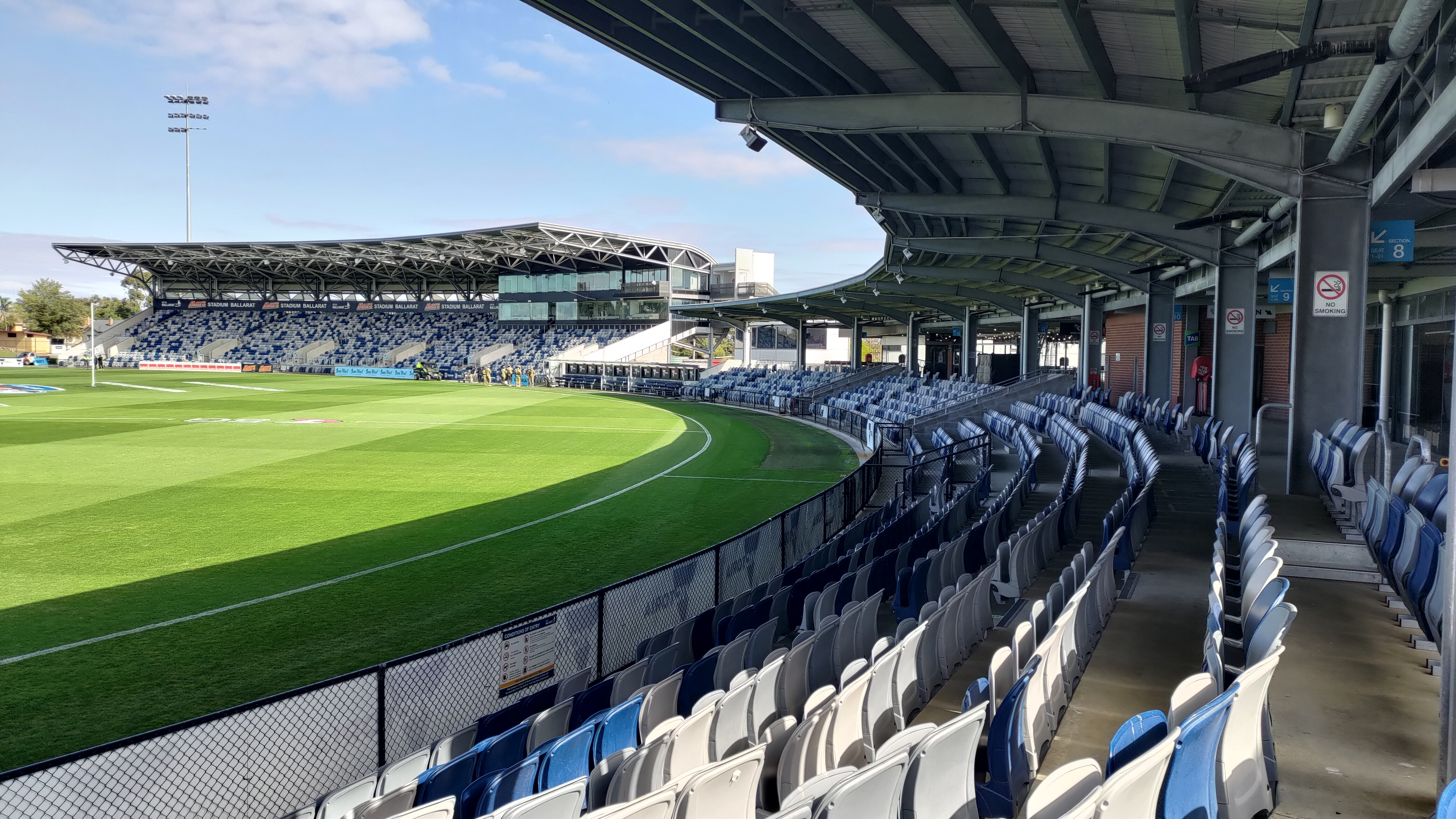
2017 Grandstand Development

In 2015 the Ballarat Council prepared a development document titled the "Ballarat Major Events Precinct Master Plan" that detailed plans for long-term multi-staged development of the overall sports precinct which encompasses Eureka Stadium, the former Ballarat Showgrounds, neighbouring sports ovals, netball courts and club pavilions as well as the re-development and expansion of the former Wendouree Netball Centre to become the Ballarat Sports Events Centre.

=== Stage one (2015–17) ===
In June 2015 the Victorian government committed $38.5 million to the initial development of the precinct, with approximately half of the funding allocated to the first stage of development of the Eureka Stadium.

Planning for construction was significantly fast-tracked, occurring whilst the reconstruction of the oval was underway during 2015. Initial design concepts for the grandstands were released for public feedback in late 2015 resulting in significant design changes before final approval in May 2016. Almost immediately, construction tenders were announced and construction commenced for a new main grandstand and terraced seating for 5000, player races, a video scoreboard, new coaches boxes and media broadcast suites. These works were completed in twelve months with the official handover occurring in July 2017.

In May 2018 the government funded a $500,000 Ballarat Council study to identify works considered necessary to immediately address the redeveloped facility's immediate needs in addition to making recommendations for the stadiums long-term development. The report was submitted to the State Government subsequently informing parts of the Victorian State Government's "Home Ground Advantage - Victoria's Major Stadia Strategy" document.

=== Stage two (2020–22) ===
From September 2020, $6.6 million was allocated to convert player and umpire/referee change-rooms as unisex facilities, build two new covered entrances with ticketing facilities, a new food and beverage outlet, permanent public conveniences at the southern boundary of the stadium, and partial concreting of the south-east viewing berm. These works being completed in March 2022 for $6.35 million, some $265,000 under the allocated budget.

Since 2018, sports users and television sports commentators have publicly criticized the stadium's present sports field lighting citing ineffectiveness during inclement weather and unsuitability for digital television broadcasts. In January 2022 the Ballarat Council unsuccessfully lobbied the State and Federal Governments for $3.5 million (AUD) funding to replace the stadium's lighting with four 50 metre towers fitted with modern LED fittings. To date no plans exist to fund the upgrade of lighting.

=== Stage three (2025–26) ===
Waddawurrung peoples inspired artwork at Mars Stadium

Mars Stadium view across oval toward scoreboard

On 11 April 2024 the state government announced the construction of an additional 5,000 permanent undercover seats on the south-eastern flank of the arena on the area formerly occupied by the main standing berm. The new stands added public amenities and two additional change rooms and player races to enable the stadium to support multiple teams supporting expanded game day and public events. Additionally, the standing embankment on the south-western flank of the arena was upgraded and features a new significantly larger video scoreboard that replaced the older board which was installed in 2017. The older board was relocated to the adjacent new athletics centre. Artwork featuring local indigenous themes was incorporated on brickwork, paving and the new scoreboard. These upgrades commenced in March 2025 and were completed in October 2026, with the first event following the redevelopment being a round 8 AFL Women's match between the Western Bulldogs and St Kilda. The redevelopment boosted the seating capacity at the stadium to 10,000 patrons, while the venue's overall capacity was left at approximately 11,000.

== Attendance records ==
Top 5 Attendance Records

| No. | Date | Teams | Sport | Competition | Crowd |
|---|---|---|---|---|---|
| 1 | 23 April 2022 | Western Bulldogs v. Adelaide | Australian Rules Football | AFL | 10,412 |
| 2 | 25 August 2024 | Western Bulldogs v. Greater Western Sydney | Australian Rules Football | AFL | 10,224 |
| 3 | 20 May 2023 | Western Bulldogs v. Adelaide | Australian Rules Football | AFL | 10,114 |
| 4 | 19 August 2017 | Western Bulldogs v. Port Adelaide | Australian Rules Football | AFL | 10,087 |
| 5 | 24 March 2024 | Western Bulldogs v. Gold Coast Suns | Australian Rules Football | AFL | 9,752 |
