= Sam Lloyd (footballer) =

Australian rules footballer (born 1990)

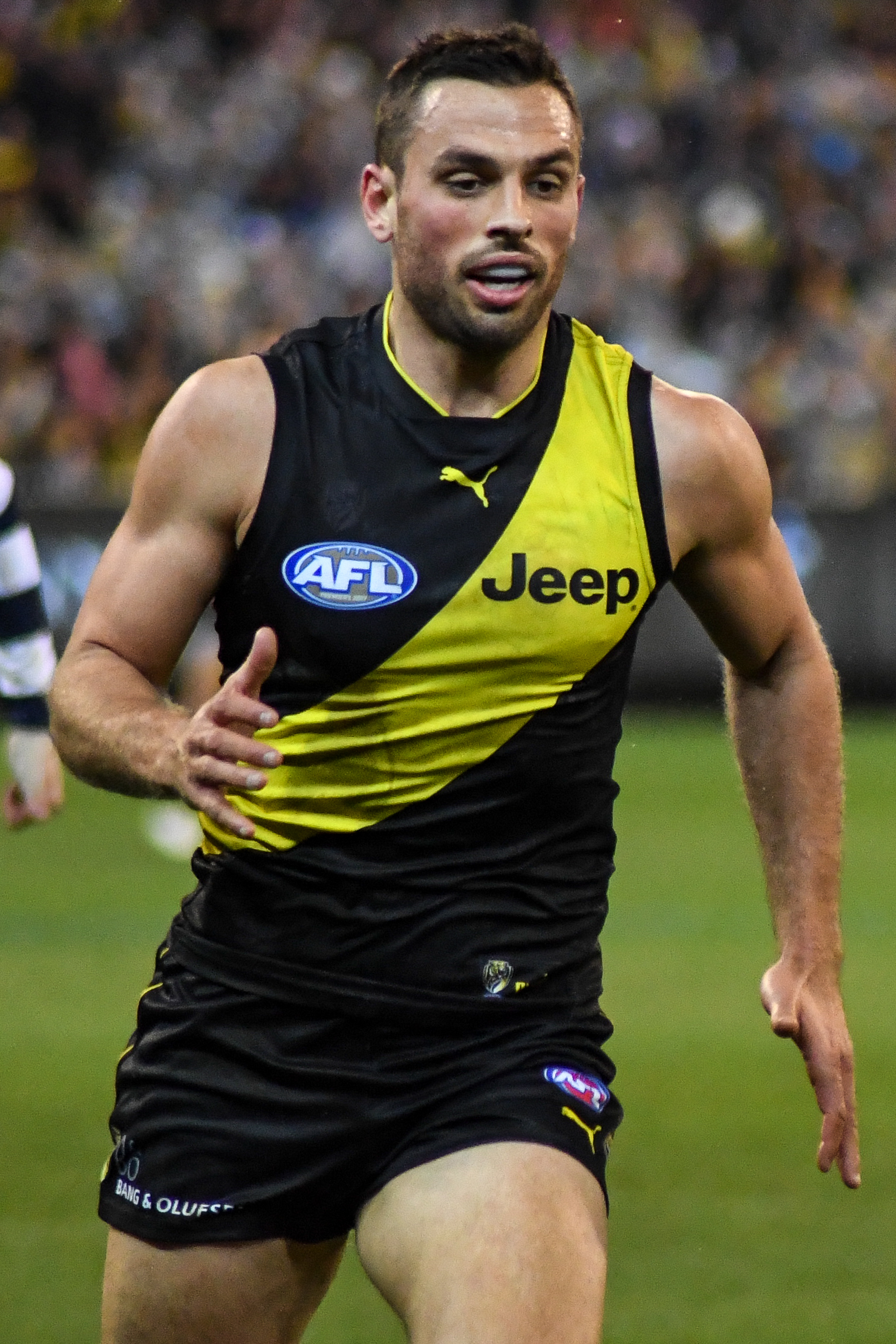
- Lloyd playing for Richmond in August 2018

Personal information
- Born: 3 March 1990 (age 36)
- Original teams: Frankston (VFL); Deniliquin (MFL)
- Draft: No. 66, 2013 AFL national draft: Richmond
- Debut: Round 4, 2014, Richmond vs. Collingwood, at MCG
- Height: 180 cm (5 ft 11 in)
- Weight: 83 kg (183 lb)
- Position: Forward / midfielder

Playing career^{1}
Years	Club	Games (Goals)
2014–2018	Richmond	57 (69)
2019–2020	Western Bulldogs	32 (45)
Total		89 (114)
- ^{1} Playing statistics correct to the end of the 2020 season.

Career highlights
- AFL: Western Bulldogs leading goalkicker: 2019; VFL: Norm Goss Memorial Medal: 2017

Sam Lloyd (born 3 March 1990) is a former Australian rules footballer. He played for the Western Bulldogs and the Richmond Football Club in the Australian Football League (AFL). Lloyd played as a midfielder and small forward and was renowned for his goal-sense and ability to win forward line one-on-one contests. He was recruited from state-league football as a mature-age player in 2013. While senior listed at Richmond in 2017, he won the Norm Goss Memorial Medal as best on ground during the club's reserves grand final in the VFL.

== Early life, junior football and state-league football ==
Lloyd grew up on a farm outside Deniliquin, in the Riverina region of New South Wales. A talented junior sportsman, he played both football and soccer. Given the long trips to and from the local towns sports facilities, his parents asked Sam and brother Jack to choose a single sport. Jack's preference won out by a tie-breaking coin toss and Sam never played a soccer match thereafter.

Following his first year of high-school Lloyd moved to Corio, Victoria to attend Geelong Grammar School. He played 23 top level matches in his final three years at the school. He was the school's leading goalkicker in his Year 11 and captained the team in his final year. Outside of school Lloyd was also a member of the Geelong Falcons squad but did not manage to play a match due to injury concerns.

He went on to play country league football and in 2010 while playing with Deniliquin in the Murray Football League, he kicked more than 100 goals for the season. Included in the total were individual match hauls of 12, 11 and 10 goals against Echuca, Congupna and Rumbalara. He remained with the club the following season and was a member of the premiership winning side.

In 2012 Lloyd played club football at Mt Eliza, then VFL football at the Bendigo Football Club. In 2013 he relocated again, to take up a role at Frankston Football Club in the VFL. He kicked 38 goals from 17 games at Frankston in 2013.

== AFL career ==
=== Richmond (2014–2018) ===
Lloyd was drafted by Richmond with the club's third pick and the 66th selection overall in the 2013 AFL National Draft.

He made his AFL debut in round 4, 2014 against Collingwood at the MCG. He was among Richmond's best in the match, kicking three goals and recording 22 disposals. Lloyd played the next four consecutive matches at AFL level, recording an average of one goal and 12 disposals per match. He was dropped ahead of the club's round 10 clash with Greater Western Sydney however and would not return to the club's senior side until round 17. Lloyd was again omitted for a final time late in the season after three consecutive matches at AFL level. He finished the year having played eight matches and kicking a total of 10 goals, including three bags of three in a match.

A strong pre-season ahead of 2015 saw Lloyd join Richmond's round 1 side to take on Carlton. He kicked three goals in the victory, and ensured he would remain in the selection mix for some time. Lloyd was ultimately dropped in round 6 however, after playing five straight matches in the club's AFL side. He played reserves football in the VFL for much of the year before reutnring to AFL football in round 17 where he played in each of the club's final seven games of the home-and-away season. Despite his string of form, Lloyd was unceremoniously dropped from the club's side to play North Melbourne in a first round elimination final. At the time coach Damien Hardwick cited the "upside" of replacement players Ben Griffiths and Reece Conca. He finished 2015 having managed 13 goals from 12 games played at AFL level.

Lloyd was again selected to play in the club's round 1 opener against Carlton in 2016. He was a major player in the side early that year, kicking 12 goals in the opening seven matches of the season. In round 8 Lloyd kicked his eighth career three-goal haul. One of these goals he kicked after the final siren, winning the Tigers the match against Sydney by one point. He went on to play in every one of the remaining games that season, finishing with a total of 35 goals from 22 games. He finished equal twelfth in the club's best and fairest and second in the club's leading goalkicker award.

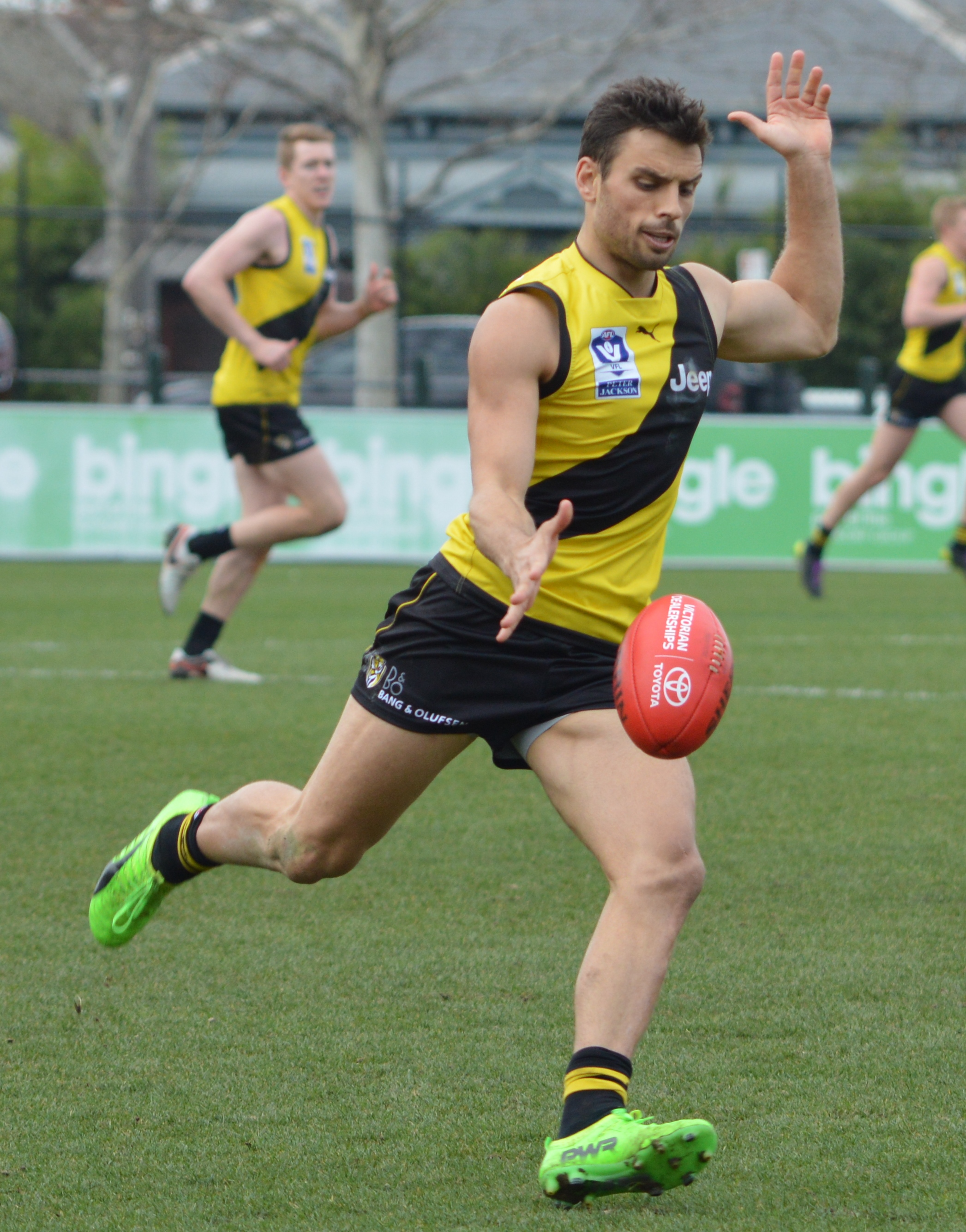
Lloyd with Richmond's VFL team in July 2017

In 2017 Lloyd would begin the season in Richmond's best-22, before a ten disposal outing saw him dropped from the club's round 2 side. It had been his 30th consecutive match at senior level. After two months of reserves football in the VFL, Lloyd returned to AFL action in round 9. He remained in the side for the next seven matches, recording goals on five occasions. He was again dropped in round 17, this time following his 50th career AFL match played the previous week against St Kilda at Etihad Stadium. He did not return to senior football in 2017 instead playing with the reserves team through to their finals campaign. He transitioned to a midfield role at that level, playing in each of the club's three finals three victories as well as in their losing grand final against Port Melbourne. He recorded 35 disposals, 10 tackles, nine clearances and a goal and received the Norm Goss Memorial Medal as the best on ground despite his side losing the match. He was the first person in the 35-year history of the award to win the medal from a losing side. Contract speculation surrounded Lloyd in the off-season that followed, with his manager confirming he had attracted some interest from other clubs. While media reports linked Lloyd to a move to Geelong, these ultimately went unfounded and Lloyd remained with Richmond at the end of the trade period. Lloyd finished the 2017 season having played eight matches and kicked six goals at senior level. He also played 12 matches in the reserves and kicked 28 goals, good for the third most at the club.

Following a strong showing in the midfield at the end of the VFL season previous, Lloyd spent the 2016-2017 off-season undergoing a permanent positional change, training exclusively with the club's midfielder group. Lloyd was one of a select group of senior players to participate in Richmond's AFLX team in February, before playing in the second of the club's two pre-season matches. He was in contention to replace the injured Dion Prestia in round 1's side, but lost out, instead playing his first AFL match of the season in round 3. Lloyd was dropped after just one match however, replaced by Prestia and premiership teammate Josh Caddy. He returned again for a single match in round 5, dropped again despite a two-goal performance. Luck favoured him in round 7, named as a last-minute injury replacement for captain Trent Cotchin and earning a second straight match for the first time in 2018 on the back of that performance. In his next match, round 8 against North Melbourne, Lloyd was named among Richmond's best while recording career-highs in disposals (24), contested possessions (13) and clearances (4). Just one more match at senior level followed, with Lloyd dropped for a third time that season ahead of round 10's match against St Kilda. He was immediately prodigious at that level, kicking four goals and gathering 33 disposals in his first match back along with two goals and 31 disposals the following week. In early June Lloyd was charged with and accepted a one-match suspension from the VFL's match review panel after engaging in rough conduct against Williamstown player Lachlan Schultz. By mid-July he was back to his best at VFL-level, recording 38 disposals and two goals in a win over the North Melbourne reserves side. Lloyd did not earn an AFL recall that week and would instead have to wait until round 20 to play again at the top level. Though he recorded 17 disposals and kicked a goal in that win over Geelong he could not hold his spot, omitted from the club's side to face Gold Coast the following week. Lloyd returned to senior football in round 22, recalled as a replacement for injured captain Trent Cotchin. He was unable to hold his spot into the finals series however, with Cotchin returning after just one match. At VFL level he helped the club secure the league's minor premiership, before sitting out the finals series' first match as a carryover emergency for the club's forthcoming AFL qualifying final against Hawthorn. Richmond football manager Neil Balme publicly spoke out against the scheduling issue that forced both Lloyd and teammate Ryan Garthwaite to miss the match, blaming a lack of cooperation between officials at the AFL and VFL. Lloyd would ultimately go unselected in that AFL final, but would be available for the following VFL semi-final against Essendon. Despite his return, the club would endure a second straight VFL finals loss that saw them knocked out of the finals series and ending their season. Lloyd finished the year having played seven matches at AFL level, while playing a further 11 with the club's reserves side in the VFL.

In early September, and while Richmond's senior side remained in the AFL finals series, a Seven Network report suggested Lloyd had been the subject of trade interest from competing AFL clubs including the Western Bulldogs. A Herald Sun report two weeks later claimed Lloyd was more likely to stay at Richmond than move to another club. Six days out from the beginning of the trade period however, Lloyd's manager announced publicly that he had agreed to a contract with the Bulldogs for 2019 and was certain to be traded there during the forthcoming player exchange period.

=== Western Bulldogs (2019–2020) ===
Lloyd was traded to the Western Bulldogs in the second week of the trade period in exchange for the club's fourth round draft selection. He enjoyed his best season since 2016, playing all 23 games for his new club in 2019 and leading the Bulldogs' goalkicking with 38 goals.

Lloyd announced his retirement from AFL football on 15 December 2020 to “pursue some exciting business opportunities outside of the football industry.”

== Statistics ==
Legend
G	Goals	K	Kicks	D	Disposals	T	Tackles
B	Behinds	H	Handballs	M	Marks

Season	Team	No.	Games	Totals							Averages (per game)						
Season	Team	No.	Games	G	B	K	H	D	M	T	G	B	K	H	D	M	T
2014	Richmond	42	8	10	5	58	37	95	27	28	1.3	0.6	7.3	4.6	11.9	3.4	3.5
2015	Richmond	27	12	13	8	71	52	123	38	21	1.1	0.7	5.9	4.3	10.3	3.2	1.8
2016	Richmond	27	22	35	13	195	89	284	95	63	1.6	0.6	8.9	4.0	12.9	4.3	2.9
2017	Richmond	27	8	6	6	72	37	109	39	23	0.8	0.8	9.0	4.6	13.6	4.9	2.9
2018	Richmond	27	7	5	1	73	49	122	21	19	0.7	0.1	10.4	7.0	17.4	3.0	2.7
2019	Western Bulldogs	22	23	38	31	250	104	354	119	54	1.7	1.4	10.9	4.5	15.4	5.2	2.4
2020 (Note: The 2020 season was played with 17 home-and-away matches per team (down from 22) and 16-minute quarters with time on (down from 20-minute quarters with time on) due to the impact of the COVID-19 pandemic.)	Western Bulldogs	22	9	7	5	47	30	77	26	20	0.8	0.6	5.2	3.3	8.6	2.9	2.2
Career			89	114	69	766	398	1164	365	228	1.3	0.8	8.6	4.8	13.1	4.1	2.6

== Honours and achievements ==
Team

- McClelland Trophy (Richmond): 2018

Individual

- VFL
  - Norm Goss Memorial Medal: 2017

== Personal life ==
Lloyd was raised in the New South Wales country town of Deniliquin by father Bill and mother Prue. He has an older brother, Jack and a younger sister, Jane.

Outside of football Lloyd has studied courses in construction management and carpentry.

Lloyd is a co-founder of Mood Swing, a community organisation that raises funds and awareness for suicide prevention and mental illness treatment.
