= Ben Lennon =

Australian rules footballer

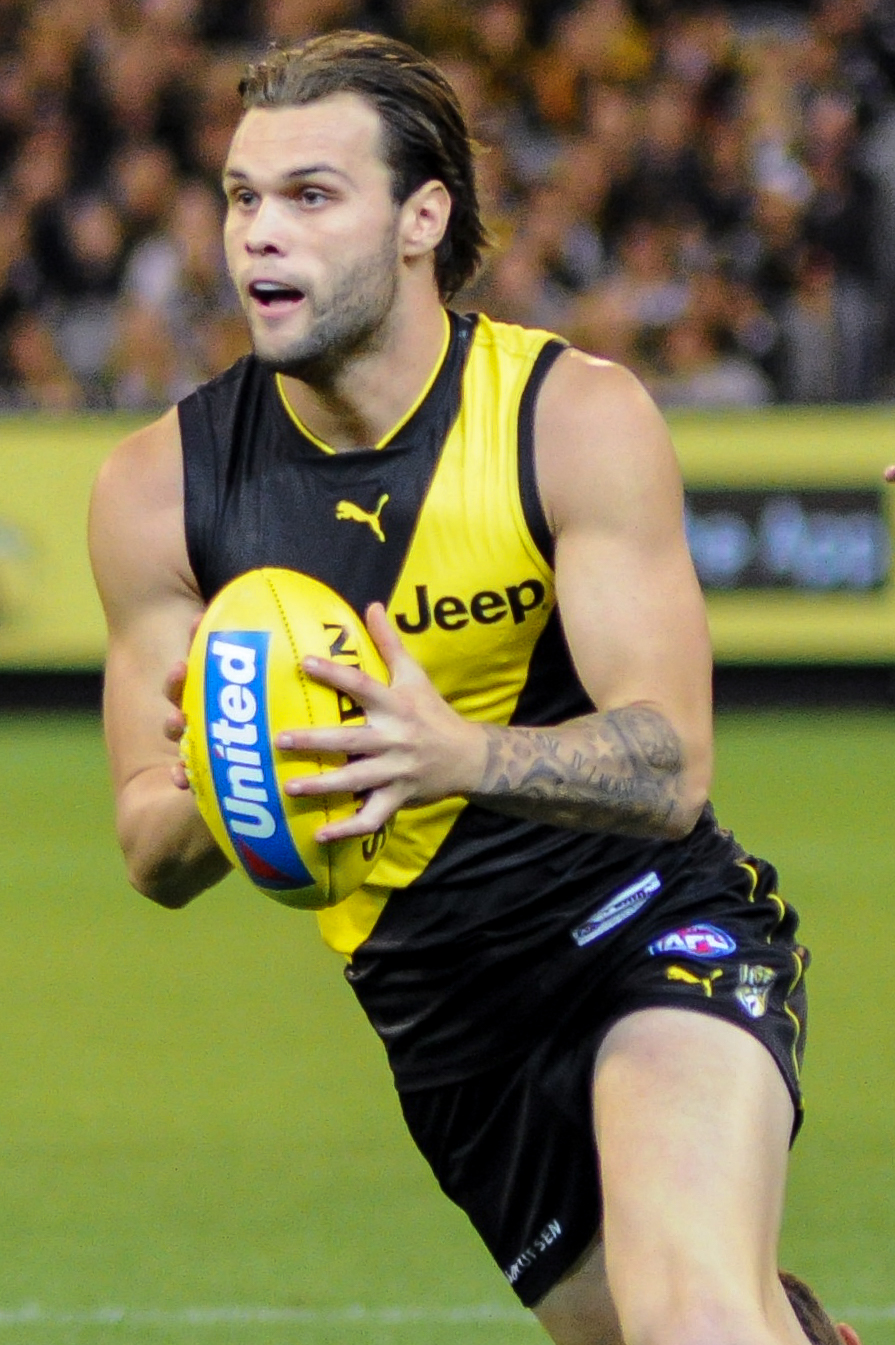
- Lennon in March 2017

Personal information
- Born: 5 July 1995 (age 31)
- Original team: Northern Knights (TAC Cup)
- Draft: No. 12, 2013 national draft
- Debut: Round 9, 2014, Richmond vs. Melbourne, at MCG
- Height: 188 cm (6 ft 2 in)
- Weight: 84 kg (185 lb)
- Position: Forward

Playing career
Years	Club	Games (Goals)
2014–2017	Richmond	21 (10)

Career highlights
- AFL Rising Star nominee: 2015

Ben Lennon (born 5 July 1995) is a former professional Australian rules footballer who played for the Richmond Football Club in the Australian Football League (AFL). He was an under-18 All Australian before becoming a first round AFL draft pick in 2013. Lennon played 21 matches with Richmond over a four-year stint at the club before being delisted, quitting the sport and taking up a scholarship offer to play American football at the University of Utah in the United States, later moving to Bethune–Cookman University.

== Early life and junior football ==
Lennon first played football at Under 9 level, at his local club Macleod.

In 2012 Lennon began playing with the Northern Knights in the TAC Cup. During the 2013 TAC Cup season Lennon had a season average of 24.7 disposals and 7.1 marks per game. He also kicked 10 goals in his seven matches for the season.

Lennon represented Victorian Metropolitan sides at many stages of his junior career including at Under 12, 15, 16 and 17 level. He represented the Victorian Metro region at the 2013 AFL Under 18 Championships, winning All-Australian selection for his performances. In 2013 he was also a member of the AIS-AFL Academy program. As part of the program he participated in a number of training sessions with the Richmond Football Club senior side in January 2013.

Prior to the end of year AFL draft, media reports emerged suggesting he was a sought-after player by clubs including Brisbane Lions, Collingwood and Richmond. Lennon was termed a "gun prospect" by AFL Media draft expert Callum Twomey in a feature article published on the AFL website in November 2013.

== AFL career ==
Lennon was drafted by Richmond with the club's first pick and the twelfth pick overall in the 2013 AFL National Draft. Following the draft Richmond recruiting manager Francis Jackson labelled him "an outstanding mark for his size" and "a constant threat overhead." Jackson also lauded Lennon for his kicking skills and decision making prowess.

Lennon's first season as a Richmond player was interrupted in February 2014, when a knee injury he sustained at training required surgery. Following his recovery he resumed his 2014 preparation by playing matches in the club's reserves side in the VFL. He made his league debut in round 9 of the 2014 season, in a match against Melbourne at the MCG. Lennon started the match as the Richmond substitute and was not brought into the game until the third quarter. Within seconds of entering the game, Lennon scored a goal for Richmond, becoming one of a select few players to have scored a goal with his first career kick. He finished the match with an equal-team-high two goals. He would play the next four matches in the club's AFL side, before being dropped from the round 14 side to play Sydney. Lennon returned to the senior side in matches in rounds 21 and 22 before again being dropped from the round 23 side. He finished the season having played seven matches and having kicked two goals.

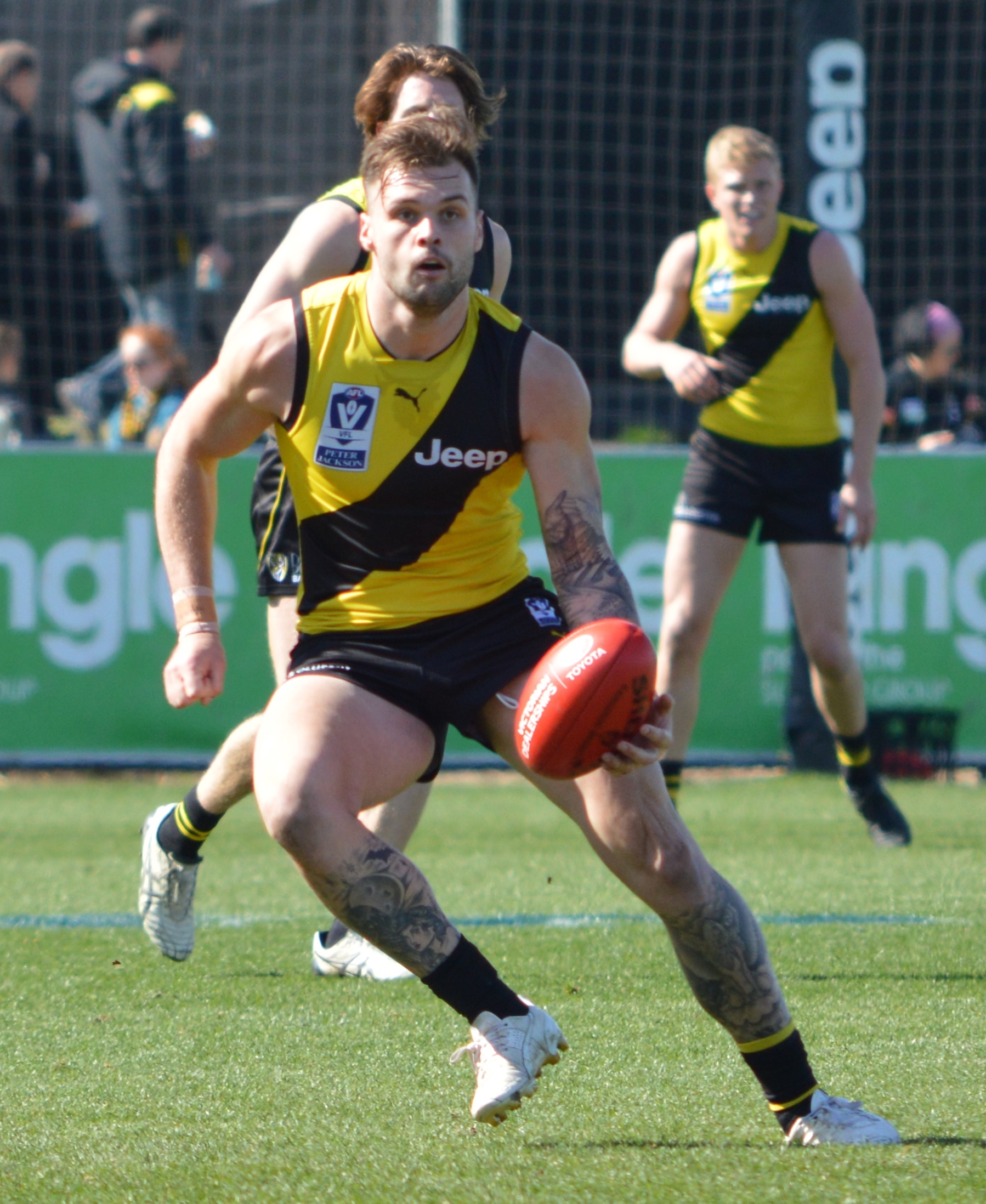
Lennon during a Richmond VFL game in August 2017.

Lennon struggled to gain AFL team selection in the early part of his second season. He played first in round 5 but struggled to make an impact, recording just three disposals in the match. He was dropped the following week and did not return to the club's AFL side until round 16, 2015. He impressed on that occasion however, recording an equal game-high three goals in the match. He played the next seven consecutive games, including a round 20 match against Gold Coast where he recorded 22 disposals. In round 22 Lennon Lennon gained a nomination for the 2015 AFL Rising Star award after a 26 disposal and nine mark performance in Richmond's win against Essendon. Despite his fine form, Lennon was dropped from the club's side to play North Melbourne in a first round elimination final. He finished the season having played nine matches and recording averages of 11.7 disposals and 4.9 marks per game. At the end of the season Lennon became the subject of media interest after efforts to strike a new contract with Richmond stalled. Reports suggest he was attracting interest from other clubs, most notably from Carlton. He was eventually re-signed by Richmond, in a two-year deal struck on 15 October.

In the 2016 pre-season Lennon was struck by a bout of glandular fever. At the time he was recovering from minor hip surgery underwent at the conclusion of the previous season. As a result of the injury and illness he missed the club's pre-season training camp and faced a limited work load for much of the early part of the year. He played in the club's senior side in rounds 3 and 4 before being dropped from the side the following week. He struggled to gain senior selection in later weeks due to two concussions suffered in VFL matches. In May he suffered an AC joint injury during a club training session. The resulting surgery forced him to miss a further six weeks of matches at all levels. He was again injured in July, with an ankle injury suffered in a VFL match keeping him out a further three weeks. Lennon played just one more match that season, in round 21 against Geelong. In his three matches that season he recorded averages of 11.7 disposals and 6.3 marks per game. On the back of a third successive season of disappointment Lennon reportedly requested a trade in late August 2016. He later revealed coach Damien Hardwick has suggested it would be beneficial to Lennon's career to seek options elsewhere. Despite this Lennon would stay put, with interest from other club's reportedly minimal.

Lennon hired a private sprint coach ahead of the 2017 season, hoping to increase his fitness base and press for senior selection in 2017. Though he did not play round 1, the strategy appeared to have paid dividends when he was selected in round 2 to take on Collingwood. He played just one more match before being dropped though, returning to reserves grade football in the VFL. There he was a significant contributor, scoring bags of goals on several occasions including a six-goal haul against North Ballarat in mid-April. Lennon looked likely to make a return in round 14 when he was named in the club's 25-man squad to take on Carlton. A hamstring injury sustained just hours before teams were to be named saw him miss out however, and ruled him out from playing for two weeks at all levels. When medium-sized forward Josh Caddy sustained a hamstring injury that ruled him out in round 22, Lennon was one of a number of forwards in the running to take up the role. He was not successful however, as eventual VFL league best and fairest winner Jacob Townsend claimed the spot and Lennon remained with the reserves. He ultimately not return to senior football in 2017 instead playing with the reserves team through to their finals campaign. There he played in each of the club's three finals three victories as well as in their losing grand final against Port Melbourne. He had an opportunity to win the game with a kick after the siren and from inside the centre square but managed to score only a behind. Lennon finished the 2017 season having played two matches and kicked one goal at senior level. He also played 18 matches in the reserves and kicked 45 goals, good for number one at the club and second most in the league.

Lennon was delisted by Richmond at the conclusion of the 2017 AFL season, after playing 21 matches over his four-year tenure at the club.

== Statistics ==
Legend
G	Goals	K	Kicks	D	Disposals	T	Tackles
B	Behinds	H	Handballs	M	Marks

Season	Team	No.	Games	Totals							Averages (per game)						
Season	Team	No.	Games	G	B	K	H	D	M	T	G	B	K	H	D	M	T
2014	Richmond	35	7	2	2	38	19	57	24	4	0.3	0.3	5.4	2.7	8.1	3.4	0.6
2015	Richmond	35	9	6	3	77	28	105	44	7	0.7	0.3	8.6	3.1	11.7	4.9	0.8
2016	Richmond	7	3	1	2	27	8	35	19	8	0.3	0.7	9.0	2.7	11.7	6.3	2.7
2017	Richmond	7	2	1	0	11	6	17	3	4	0.5	0.0	5.5	3.0	8.5	1.5	2.0
Career			21	10	7	153	61	214	90	23	0.5	0.3	7.3	2.9	10.2	4.3	1.1

== American football career ==
Lennon did not nominate for the AFL draft after his de-listing by Richmond in 2017, instead learning the American football skill of punting, in an attempt to play the sport at college level in the United States. In January 2018 he received a scholarship to join the University of Utah one year later in 2019. After two seasons with the Utes (the second disrupted by the COVID-19 pandemic), he switched to Bethune–Cookman University in Florida.

== Personal life ==
Lennon was born to parents Stephen and Lesley. He has two sisters, Kara and Grace; Grace is a professional golfer.

During the 2014 pre-season period Lennon starred in an AFL Media documentary called Draft Days. The documentary follows the progress of three childhood friends who are striving to be a part of the AFL draft. The other players are Jack Billings (drafted by St Kilda) and Luke McDonald (drafted by North Melbourne).
