= Jacob Townsend =

Australian rules footballer (born 1993)

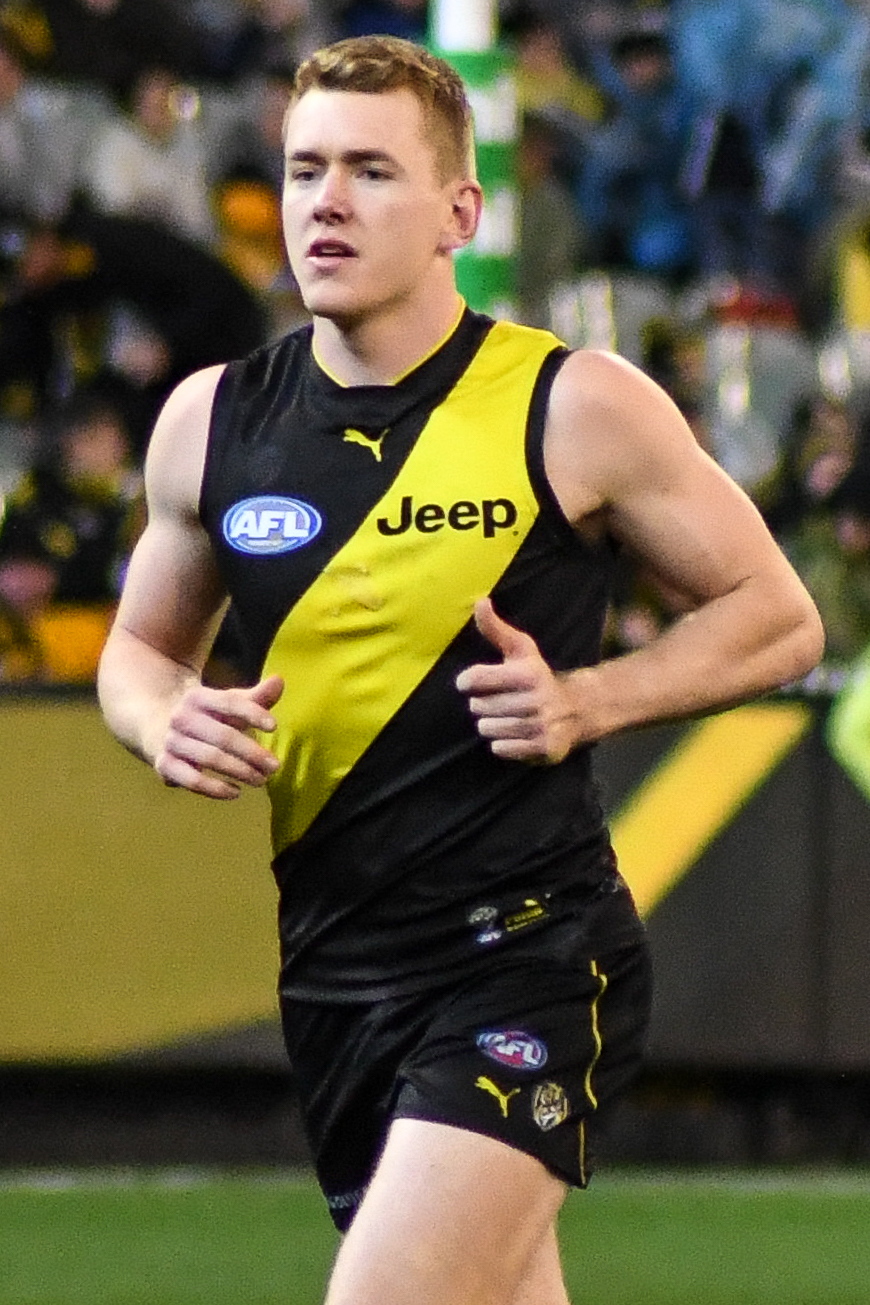
- Townsend playing for Richmond in August 2018

Personal information
- Nickname: Towner
- Born: 20 June 1993 (age 33); Leeton, New South Wales
- Original team: Leeton-Whitton (RFNL)/GWS Giants (TAC Cup)
- Draft: No. 32, 2019 AFL rookie draft: Richmond No. 5, 2021 Rookie draft: Gold Coast
- Debut: Round 1, 2012, Greater Western Sydney vs. Sydney, at ANZ Stadium
- Height: 187 cm (6 ft 2 in)
- Weight: 89 kg (196 lb)
- Position: Forward

Playing career^{1}
Years	Club	Games (Goals)
2012–2015	Greater Western Sydney	28 (4)
2016–2019	Richmond	20 (28)
2020	Essendon	12 (9)
2021	Gold Coast	2 (3)
Total		62 (44)
- ^{1} Playing statistics correct to the end of 2021.

Career highlights
- AFL: AFL Premiership player: 2017; GWS Giants Inaugural AFL team: 2012; VFL: VFL Premiership player: 2019; J. J. Liston Trophy: 2017

Jacob Townsend (born 20 June 1993) is an Australian rules footballer who currently plays for the Southport Football Club in the Victorian Football League (VFL). He previously played professionally for Greater Western Sydney, Richmond, Essendon and the Gold Coast Suns in the Australian Football League (AFL).

He won an AFL premiership with Richmond in 2017 while also winning the VFL's J. J. Liston Trophy in the same year during matches played with Richmond's reserves side, before winning a VFL premiership with the same reserves side in 2019.

== Early life and junior football ==
Townsend was born to mother, Denise and father, Peter in Leeton, a small town outside Wagga Wagga in the Riverina region of country New South Wales. He played junior football in the area, with the local Leeton-Whitton Football Club in the Riverina Football League. He first took up the sport at age 13, after playing junior rugby union for a number of years with the Leeton Phantoms. He attended St Francis de Sales Regional College in Leeton.

Townsend represented his state under the banner of NSW/ACT Rams at national carnivals at under 16 level.

In 2010 he played with the GWS side competing in the TAC Cup for under 18 players in Victoria. Townsend was runner-up in the club's best and fairest count that season.

He was a strong performer when he represented the NSW/ACT Rams at the 2010 AFL Under 18 Championships.

Ahead of the 2011 underage season, Townsend was selected to join the AFL/AIS Academy program. As part of the program he would train with an AFL club over the summer and travel with the Academy group on an overseas trip to Europe. He was the only NSW player to earn selection that year. He moved to Sydney in October 2010 and completed his schooling there through the end of 2011.

== AFL playing career ==
=== GWS Giants (2012-2015) ===
Townsend was recruited to the GWS Giants through zoning concessions and signed his first contract while still in high school in 2010, opting out of a potential nomination in for the AFL draft in the process.

He would go on to train and play for the club in matches prior to its introduction to the AFL in 2012.

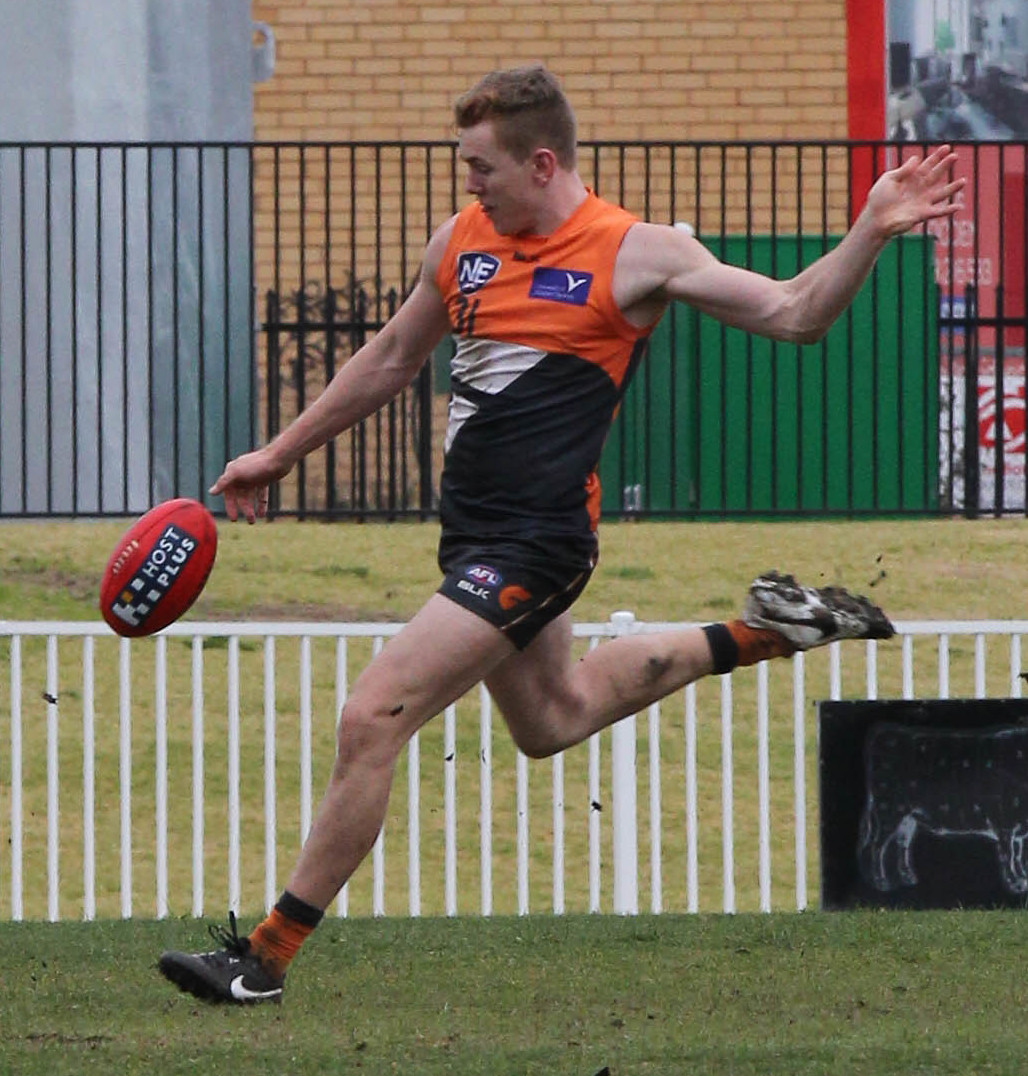
Townsend kicks the ball during a NEAFL match with the Giants in August 2015

Townsend made his AFL debut in round 1, 2012 in the Giants' inaugural match against Sydney at ANZ Stadium. He kicked his first career goal two weeks later, in round 3 against West Coast. He would play in eight of the club's first ten matches, missing only in round 6 and 8. In round 11 he went again un-selected at AFL level, and was restrained to NEAFL level until round 17. It was then that he played in the first of his final three matches of the season. Injuries were a heavy impediment to game time that season, with Townsend playing only two matches at reserves level in addition to his 11 at AFL level. He record a total of 88 disposals and 37 tackles in senior matches that year. He was awarded the Coaches award at the club's inaugural award presentation. At the end of the 2012 season Townsend signed another three-year contract with the Giants, keeping him at the club until the end of the 2015 season.

Townsend played his first match of the 2013 AFL season in round 4, but was immediately omitted from the side the following week. He returned in round 6 for a further two weeks before being dropped for a second time. Townsend played in a further five matches that season including in round 14 where Townsend was involved in an incident with Lindsay Thomas that saw the North Melbourne player suspended for headbutting. His year was prematurely ended in early August when he underwent hip surgery. He had played eight matches at AFL level in 2013.

2014's first game for Townsend came in round 2, where he kicked a goal and recorded 10 disposals against St Kilda at Etihad Stadium. He remained in the senior side for the next two round before being dropped following a five touch match in round 4. Townsend returned to senior football in round 10 and played in the next four consecutive matches. Another five disposal match would see him miss the next three matches though before he played his last match of the season in round 17. Despite playing in just eight matches he placed tenth at the club for total tackles that season.

Townsend fell even further out of favour with Giants selectors in 2015, with a combination of form and a foot injury keeping him relegated to reserves football in the NEAFL for almost the entire season. He played just one match, in the final round of the year against Melbourne at Etihad Stadium. He recorded a career high 22 disposals in the match, along with six tackles and four clearances.

=== Richmond (2016-2019) ===
In the AFL trade period in October 2015, Townsend was traded to Richmond in exchange for a fourth round draft selection.

He faced a limited training program during his first pre-season as a result of a minor ankle injury. By late March Townsend had impressed Richmond selectors, who handed him a club debut in round 1 of the 2016 season. He played again the following week before being dropped from the club's round 3 side. Townsend returned to senior football in round 5, but only for one match. He played just once more that season, in round 14 when he recorded nine disposals against Brisbane. At season's end he had played a total of four senior matches.

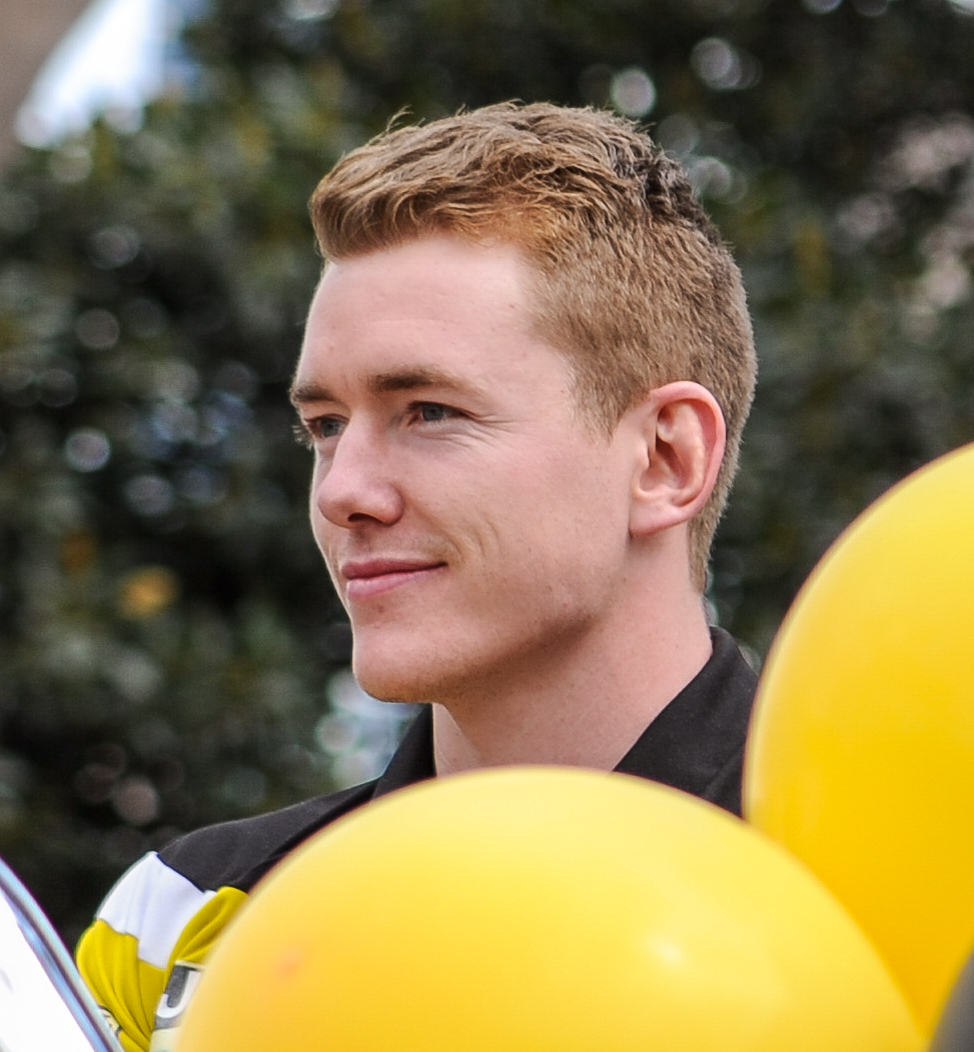
Townsend during the 2017 AFL Grand Final parade

Townsend spent the vast majority of the 2017 season playing reserves grade football with Richmond's VFL side. He split his time between the midfield and forward-line at that level through mid-August, playing 15 games. He eventually played his first senior match of the season in round 22, when he replaced the injured Josh Caddy in a forward role. In what was ultimately a 104-point Tiger victory, Townsend contributed a match-high six goals. Not only was it a career best haul, it eclipsed his total four goals kicked across his previous 32 career AFL matches. It was at this time that Fox Footy commentator Dermott Brereton labelled Townsend possibly the toughest player in the league.

The following week, in the final round of the home and away season, Townsend turned in another outstanding performance when he kicked five goals in Richmond's victory over St Kilda. His form guaranteed he would retain his spot into the finals series, despite Caddy returning to fitness and to the senior side. Townsend opened up Richmond's finals campaign with two goals on just three disposals, helping this side to a qualifying final victory over Geelong. He added another goal in the preliminary final as Richmond won their way to a Grand Final match-up with minor premiers Adelaide. Townsend went on to feature in Richmond's premiership winning team, kicking two goals in the 48-point win.

In addition to his scoreboard impact he also played a key negating role on Adelaide rebounding defender Jake Lever. Townsend's five goals across three finals was level with Norm Smith Medalist Dustin Martin as the equal best of any Richmond player that series. By winning a premiership medal he became the first player from the inaugural GWS Giants team to do so.

In addition to his AFL premiership, he also received the J. J. Liston Trophy as the VFL's best & fairest player in that league's home and away season. He finished the year having played five games at senior level and 15 matches with the reserves, kicking 16 and 14 goals respectively. He ranked number one at Richmond and second in the AFL for goals per game that year as well as fifth in the league for tackles inside 50 per game.

After signing a one-year contract extension in the off-season, Townsend entered 2018 in a strong vein of form. He played pre-season matches against Essendon and North Melbourne in February and March before reprising his premiership winning mid-sized-forward role in round 1 of the AFL season. Townsend kicked an equal team-high four goals in that win and attracted significant praise for his defensive role on Carlton interceptor Liam Jones. AFL Media's Kane Cornes noted Townsend as a notable omission from his own Round 1 Team of the Week on the back of that performance. He added another haul of three goals in round 4 but after a run of five straight games at senior level, was omitted from the club's round 6 team to play Collingwood. He returned after just one match out however, and played a further three matches at AFL level before being dropped again in round 10 in favour of genuine tall-forward Callum Moore.

While playing at the lower level Townsend received a one-match suspension for striking Box Hill midfielder and former Richmond teammate Andrew Moore in late June. Townsend earned an AFL recall in round 19, replacing the omitted Moore. Another strong performance as a defensive-forward followed, along with goals that week and in round 20 also. Despite that, he was dropped for a third time that season and returned to football in the VFL. While playing at that level and in the final match of the VFL home and away season Townsend suffered a severe ankle injury. The fractured fibula sustained in the incident came with an expected recovery period of at least two months and saw Townsend's season effectively ended at both VFL and AFL levels. He had played 10 senior matches and kicked 12 goals at AFL level in addition to seven matches and seven goals in the reserves competition. Townsend did not receive a contract extension offer from Richmond during the 2018 season and media reports in July suggested Townsend's future at the club would depend heavily on the free-agency decision of Richmond-linked former Gold Coast captain Tom Lynch.

During an unsure trade period, Townsend received significant interest from other clubs including St Kilda, Sydney and Gold Coast but received no formal offers. He was delisted by Richmond at the end of that period, but with the understanding that he would be re-selected in the upcoming rookie draft if he failed to find a contract with another AFL club. Townsend appeared close to deals with both Sydney and his former club the GWS Giants in the weeks that followed, undergoing medical exams at each. No offer eventuated from either club however and Townsend was eventually re-selected by Richmond with the 32nd pick in the rookie draft.

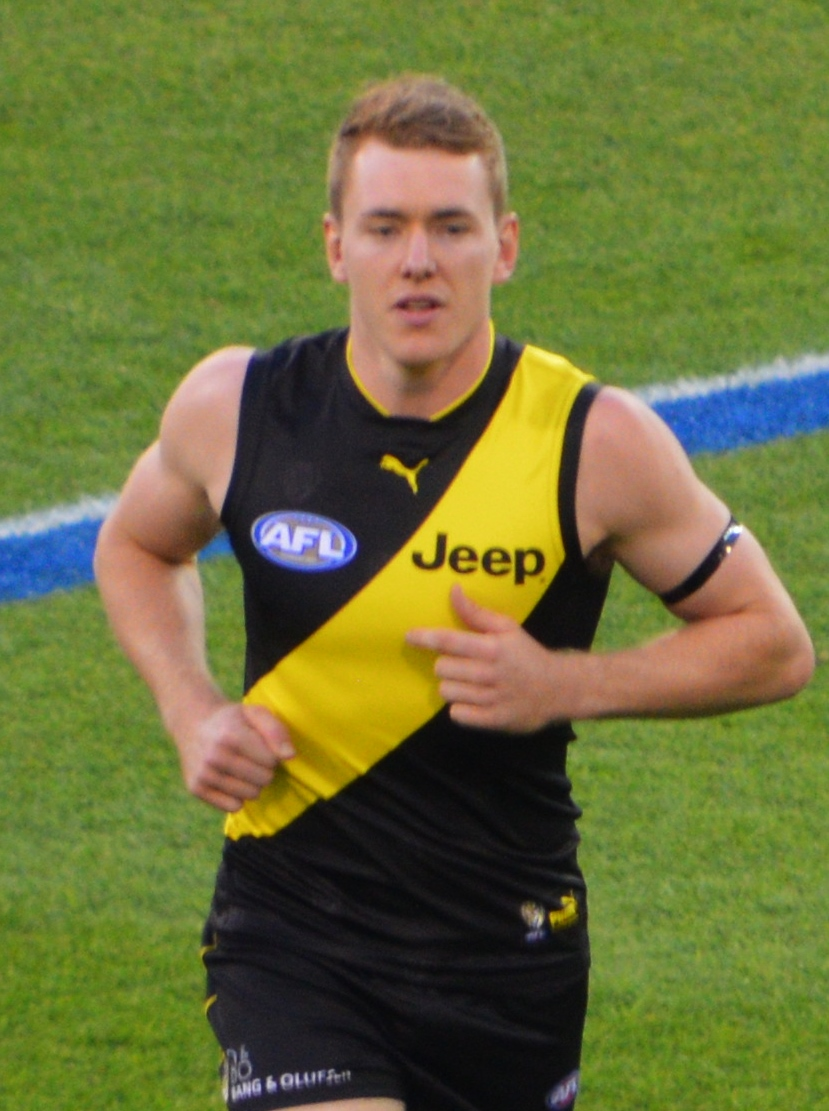
Townsend in round 1, 2018

Townsend spent the majority of the 2019 pre-season training period on the sidelines, continuing to deal with the continuing effects of his 2018 leg injury as well as other related lower leg complications. He returned to reserves-grade football in March, before edging close to AFL selection by being named as an emergency ahead of round 4's match against Port Adelaide. Towsend continued to go unselected for AFL football through the end of May despite being again named as emergency in round 9. After recording 22 disposals, eight marks and seven inside-50s in a VFL match in early June, Townsend earned a recall to AFL football for his first match at the level since round 20, 2018. He managed only an equal career-low three disposals and went goalless in that match, immediately dropped backed to VFL level. At the lower level the following week, he produced a game-high five goals in a win over Coburg. Townsend remained with the club's minor-premiership-winning VFL side through to the start of their finals series, playing an important role in a come-from-behind qualifying final win over the Essendon reserves. He contributed in a VFL preliminary final a fortnight later, as Richmond's reserves won through to that league's grand final. He kicked a goal in the Richmond VFL side that defeated Williamstown the following week, helping win the club's first reserves grade premiership since 1997. Townsend finished 2019 having played just one match at AFL level but was Richmond's equal-leading goalkicker in the reserves, with 21 goals across 18 games including that year's VFL premiership.

At the end of the season, Townsend was delisted by Richmond after four seasons at the club which included 20 matches and a premiership at AFL level, as well as a league best and fairest and premiership at reserves level in the VFL. In the month that followed, Townsend began seeking AFL opportunities elsewhere including a possible return to the Giants, before touring the training facilities of Essendon in late November.

=== Essendon (2020) ===
Townsend signed with Essendon during the pre-season supplemental selection period on 4 December 2019.

Rather than continuing in his Richmond role as a defensive forward, Townsend was informed upon signing of the club's intention to use him as an inside midfielder, a role which he had played extensively at reserves level and in the early part of his career at AFL level.

Townsend was delisted by Essendon at the conclusion of the 2020 season. Jacob Townsend was rookie drafted by the Gold Coast Suns with pick 5 on Thursday afternoon.

=== Gold Coast Suns (2021) ===
After Townsend was delisted by Essendon at the conclusion of the 2020 season, He was selected by the Gold Coast Suns with pick 5 in the 2021 AFL rookie draft where he played two AFL games for the Suns before getting delisted at the end of the season. The Suns offered Townsend a chance to train over the summer in an attempt to be re-drafted for the 2022 AFL season but he decided to turn down the opportunity and signed to play for Gold Coast-based VFL team Southport Sharks instead.

== Coaching career ==
On 2 November 2025, it was announced that Townsend joined the Carlton Football Club as an assistant coach in the role of development under senior coach Michael Voss.

== Statistics ==
Legend
G	Goals	K	Kicks	D	Disposals	T	Tackles
B	Behinds	H	Handballs	M	Marks

Season	Team	No.	Games	Totals							Averages (per game)							Votes
Season	Team	No.	Games	G	B	K	H	D	M	T	G	B	K	H	D	M	T	Votes
2012	Greater Western Sydney	31	11	2	3	50	38	88	25	37	0.2	0.3	4.5	3.5	8.0	2.3	3.4	0
2013	Greater Western Sydney	31	8	0	1	50	43	93	21	25	0.0	0.1	6.3	5.4	11.6	2.6	3.1	0
2014	Greater Western Sydney	31	8	1	3	47	37	84	17	60	0.1	0.4	5.9	4.6	10.6	2.1	7.5	0
2015	Greater Western Sydney	31	1	1	0	10	12	22	3	6	1.0	0.0	10.0	12.0	22.0	3.0	6.0	0
2016	Richmond	21	4	0	0	25	30	55	17	19	0.0	0.0	6.3	7.5	13.8	4.3	4.8	0
2017	Richmond	21	5	16	2	32	17	49	14	19	3.2	0.4	6.4	3.4	9.8	2.8	3.8	1
2018	Richmond	21	10	12	7	53	40	93	27	30	1.2	0.7	5.3	4.0	9.3	2.7	3.0	0
2019	Richmond	21	1	0	0	1	2	3	1	4	0.0	0.0	1.0	2.0	3.0	1.0	4.0	0
2020 (Note: The 2020 season was played with 17 home-and-away matches per team (down from 22) and 16-minute quarters with time on (down from 20-minute quarters with time on) due to the impact of the COVID-19 pandemic.)	Essendon	20	12	9	5	53	22	75	22	32	0.8	0.4	4.4	1.8	6.3	1.8	2.7	0
2021	Gold Coast	21	2	3	0	15	9	24	8	5	1.5	0.0	7.5	4.5	12.0	4.0	2.5	0
Career			62	44	21	336	250	586	155	237	0.7	0.3	5.4	4.0	9.5	2.5	3.8	1

== Honours and achievements ==
Team

- AFL Premiership player (Richmond): 2017
- McClelland Trophy (Richmond): 2018

Individual

- Inaugural GWS Giants AFL team: 2012

VFL

- VFL Premiership player: 2019
- J. J. Liston Trophy: 2017

== Personal life ==
Townsend has two older sisters, Emily and Sarah.
