= Ballarat Cricket Association =

The Ballarat Cricket Association is a cricket league which operates in Ballarat, Victoria, Australia. The league has three divisions for under-13s, two grades of under-15s, 1 grade under-17s alone with an U11s, U14 and U17s girls league. There are 8 senior men’s leagues which consist of a premier division and 4 championship division and 3 one day leagues named by letters along with two women’s leagues and a T20 league . The league also has select teams for different competitions, as well as for the 'Country Week' competition against teams such as Maryborough, Grampians, Castlemaine and Bendigo.

Ballarat has hosted international and interstate matches since 1862 when the first England touring team captained by H. H. Stephenson of Surrey played a XXII from Ballarat. The most notable match played in Ballarat was during the 1932-33 England tour of Australia known as the Bodyline series on 22 January 1933. There was speculation in the Australian press leading up to the match that the Ballarat team may employ Bodyline tactics in response to the controversial tactic being employed by England in the Test matches. H. Brereton, the Secretary of the Victorian Cricket Association (VCA) wrote to the Ballarat Cricket Association stating that any organised body attack employed by the Ballarat team would be viewed with great disfavour by the VCA.

In the luncheon, the acting mayor of Ballarat J. Harrison criticised Bodyline and hoped that it would not continue. In response, the England captain Douglas Jardine defended his team and his leading fast bowler Harold Larwood. The England manager Plum Warner said von Moltke could speak seven languages and be silent in all of them. Warner said that he could speak one language and preferred to remain silent in it. Warner congratulated the Ballarat Cricket Association on the state of the ground and on its teams play that morning.

Ken Mackenzie during the 1940s was: Secretary of Ballarat Cricket Association, a member of Ballarat Basketball Tribunal Association, involved with the Victorian Provincial Baseball League and Ballarat Softball Team; a foundation member and president of Ballarat Sportsmen's Club which now gives and annual Mackenzie trophy for services to sport. He was also a member of Ballarat Historical Park Association. Mr. McKenzie died during 1969.

Ballarat's Eastern Oval hosted a match during the 1992 cricket World Cup between England and Sri Lanka played on 9 March 1992. England won the match by 106 runs, scoring 280 for 6 and bowling the Sri Lankans out for 174. The ground has also played host to visiting international teams for "warm-up" matches in tours to Australia, such as when Victoria played an England XI in Ballarat in both 1985 and 1990.

== Teams ==
The teams in the association at the beginning of 2026/27 season:

- V.R.I Delacombe CC (Victorian Railways Institute) (playing at Doug Dean Reserve)
- Brown Hill CC (playing at Western Oval/Progress Park)
- Coronet City CC Founded By Rex Fleming (playing at Ballarat High School)
- Darley CC (playing at Darley Park)
- East Ballarat CC (playing at Russell Square Field)
- Golden Point CC Owned By Rex Fleming As Of 13/01/24 (playing at Eastern Oval)
- Mount Clear CC (playing at Mount Clear Oval)
- Lucas CC (playing at Victoria Park)
- North Ballarat CC (playing at Eureka Stadium)
- Wendouree CC (playing at Wendouree Oval 1)
- Ballan CC (playing at Cowie St)
- Ballarat Fire Brigade CC (B.F.B)
- Buninyong CC (playing at Buninyoung Community Reserve)
- Burrumbeet CC (playing at Remembrance Drive)
- Creswick Imperials CC (playing at Doug Lindsay Reserve)
- Dunnstown CC (playing at Old Melbourne Road)
- Napoleons/Sebastopol CC (playing at Napoleons)
- Ballarat/Redan CC (playing at City Oval/Alfredton Oval)
- Bacchus Marsh CC (playing at Bacchus Marsh Racecourse Recreation Reserve/Maddingley Park)

== See also ==
- Cricket

== External references ==
- Garrie Hutchinson, 200 Years of Australian Cricket 1804-2004 Pan MacMillan Australia, Sydney 2004
- Melbourne Age article on England's match in Ballarat during 1933
- ICC 1999 World Cup Summary
