= AFL Players Association awards =

Awards mainly given to Australian rules footballers

The AFL Players Association (AFLPA) awards are a group of awards given annually, mainly to players in the Australian Football League and AFL Women's, voted for by all AFL and AFL Women's players.

== Main awards ==
The AFLPA nominates the following as their main awards.

=== Most valuable player ===
In the VFL/AFL, the most valuable player award is named the Leigh Matthews Trophy. It has been awarded by the players to the best player of the season annually since 1982. It is the AFLPA equivalent of the Brownlow Medal (voted for by umpires), and a variety of media-sponsored MVP awards. Gary Ablett, Jr. (2007–09, 2012–13) is the only player to win the award five times, while Marcus Bontempelli (2021, 2023–24) has won the award three times. Greg Williams (1985, 1994), Wayne Carey (1995, 1998), Michael Voss (2002, 2003), Chris Judd (2006, 2011), Nat Fyfe (2014, 2015), and Nick Daicos (2024, 2026) have won the award twice.

In the AFL Women's, it has been awarded since the inaugural season in 2017. Erin Phillips and Jasmine Garner are the only two players to win the award on multiple occasions.

VFL/AFL (Leigh Matthews Trophy)

| Season | Player | Team |
|---|---|---|
| 1982 | Leigh Matthews | Hawthorn |
| 1983 | Terry Daniher | Essendon |
| 1984 | Russell Greene | Hawthorn |
| 1985 | Greg Williams | Geelong |
| 1986 | Paul Roos | Fitzroy |
| 1987 | Tony Lockett | St Kilda |
| 1988 | Gerard Healy | Sydney |
| 1989 | Tim Watson | Essendon |
| 1990 | Darren Millane | Collingwood |
| 1991 | Jim Stynes | Melbourne |
| 1992 | Jason Dunstall | Hawthorn |
| 1993 | Gary Ablett Sr. | Geelong |
| 1994 | Greg Williams (2) | Carlton |
| 1995 | Wayne Carey | North Melbourne |
| 1996 | Corey McKernan | North Melbourne |
| 1997 | Robert Harvey | St Kilda |
| 1998 | Wayne Carey (2) | North Melbourne |
| 1999 | Shane Crawford | Hawthorn |
| 2000 | Anthony Koutoufides | Carlton |
| 2001 | Andrew McLeod | Adelaide |
| 2002 | Luke Darcy | Western Bulldogs |
| 2002 | Michael Voss | Brisbane Lions |
| 2003 | Michael Voss (2) | Brisbane Lions |
| 2004 | Nick Riewoldt | St Kilda |
| 2005 | Ben Cousins | West Coast |
| 2006 | Chris Judd | West Coast |
| 2007 | Gary Ablett Jr. | Geelong |
| 2008 | Gary Ablett Jr. (2) | Geelong |
| 2009 | Gary Ablett Jr. (3) | Geelong |
| 2010 | Dane Swan | Collingwood |
| 2011 | Chris Judd (2) | Carlton |
| 2012 | Gary Ablett Jr. (4) | Gold Coast |
| 2013 | Gary Ablett Jr. (5) | Gold Coast |
| 2014 | Nat Fyfe | Fremantle |
| 2015 | Nat Fyfe (2) | Fremantle |
| 2016 | Patrick Dangerfield | Geelong |
| 2017 | Dustin Martin | Richmond |
| 2018 | Tom Mitchell | Hawthorn |
| 2019 | Patrick Cripps | Carlton |
| 2020 | Lachie Neale | Brisbane Lions |
| 2021 | Marcus Bontempelli | Western Bulldogs |
| 2022 | Andrew Brayshaw | Fremantle |
| 2023 | Marcus Bontempelli (2) | Western Bulldogs |
| 2024 | Marcus Bontempelli (3) | Western Bulldogs |
| 2025 | Nick Daicos | Collingwood |
| 2026 | Nick Daicos (2) | Collingwood |

AFL Women's

| Season | Player | Club |
|---|---|---|
| 2017 | Erin Phillips | Adelaide |
| 2018 | Courtney Gum | Greater Western Sydney |
| 2019 | Erin Phillips (2) | Adelaide |
| 2020 | Jasmine Garner | North Melbourne |
| 2021 | Brianna Davey | Collingwood |
| 2022 (S6) | Emily Bates | Brisbane |
| 2022 (S7) | Monique Conti | Richmond |
| 2023 | Jasmine Garner (2) | North Melbourne |
| 2024 | Ebony Marinoff | Adelaide |
| 2025 | Jasmine Garner (3) | North Melbourne |

=== Best captain ===
In the VFL/AFL, the best captain award was given sporadically from 1986 until 1997, and has been given annually since 1998. Michael Voss won the award four times from 2001 to 2004, the most of any player.

In the AFL Women's, the award has been given since the inaugural season in 2017. Daisy Pearce holds the record for most wins with four, in 2017, 2018, 2020 and 2022 (S6).

VFL/AFL

| Season | Player | Club |
|---|---|---|
| 1986 | Michael Tuck | Hawthorn |
| 1987 | Stephen Kernahan | Carlton |
| 1988 | Ross Glendinning | West Coast |
| 1989 | No award | |
| 1990 | Tony Shaw | Collingwood |
| 1991 | No award | |
| 1992 | Paul Roos | Fitzroy |
| 1993 | No award | |
| 1994 | Stephen Kernahan (2) | Carlton |
| 1995 | Wayne Carey | North Melbourne |
| 1996 | No award | |
| 1997 | No award | |
| 1998 | Wayne Carey (2) | North Melbourne |
| 1999 | Paul Kelly | Sydney |
| 2000 | Wayne Carey (3) | Kangaroos |
| 2001 | Michael Voss | Brisbane Lions |
| 2002 | Michael Voss (2) | Brisbane Lions |
| 2003 | Michael Voss (3) | Brisbane Lions |
| 2004 | Michael Voss (4) | Brisbane Lions |
| 2005 | Mark Ricciuto | Adelaide |
| 2006 | Mark Ricciuto (2) | Adelaide |
| 2007 | Jonathan Brown | Brisbane Lions |
| 2008 | Tom Harley | Geelong |
| 2009 | Jonathan Brown (2) | Brisbane Lions |
| 2010 | Brett Kirk | Sydney |
| 2011 | Chris Judd | Carlton |
| 2012 | Jobe Watson | Essendon |
| 2013 | Joel Selwood | Geelong |
| 2014 | Luke Hodge | Hawthorn |
| 2015 | Bob Murphy | Western Bulldogs |
| 2016 | Taylor Walker | Adelaide |
| 2017 | Taylor Walker (2) | Adelaide |
| 2018 | Trent Cotchin | Richmond |
| 2019 | Shannon Hurn | West Coast |
| 2020 | Scott Pendlebury | Collingwood |
| 2021 | Marcus Bontempelli | Western Bulldogs |
| 2022 | Scott Pendlebury (2) | Collingwood |
| 2023 | Marcus Bontempelli (2) | Western Bulldogs |
| 2024 | Marcus Bontempelli (3) | Western Bulldogs |
| 2025 | Jordan Dawson | Adelaide |
| 2026 | Jordan Dawson (2) | Adelaide |

AFL Women's

| Season | Player | Club |
|---|---|---|
| 2017 | Daisy Pearce | Melbourne |
| 2018 | Daisy Pearce (2) | Melbourne |
| 2019 | Brianna Davey | Carlton |
| 2020 | Daisy Pearce (3) | Melbourne |
| 2021 | Ellie Blackburn | Western Bulldogs |
| 2022 (S6) | Daisy Pearce (4) | Melbourne |
| 2022 (S7) | Chelsea Randall | Adelaide |
| 2023 | Kate Hore | Melbourne |
| 2024 | Ebony Marinoff | Adelaide |
| 2025 | Jasmine Garner | North Melbourne |

=== Best first-year player ===
In the AFL, this award has been given annually since 1998. It is awarded to the best adjudged player who is in his first year on an AFL list. The eligibility for the award is different from the AFL's other main award for the best performing young player, the AFL Rising Star, which can be won by any player aged under 21 as of 1 January that year, and who has not played more than ten matches before the start of the season. Michael Barlow, for example, won the award in 2010 but was not eligible for the Rising Star. Brownlow Medallists Adam Goodes and Chris Judd have both won the award in the past.

In the AFL Women's, the award has been given since the second season in 2018. There is a similarly decreased focus on youth—for example, Richmond's Eilish Sheerin won the award in 2022 (S7) at the age of 30.

AFL

| Season | Player | Club |
|---|---|---|
| 1998 | Nick Stevens | Port Adelaide |
| 1999 | Adam Goodes | Sydney |
| 2000 | Paul Hasleby | Fremantle |
| 2001 | Daniel Kerr | West Coast |
| 2002 | Chris Judd | West Coast |
| 2003 | Daniel Wells | Kangaroos |
| 2004 | Aaron Davey | Melbourne |
| 2005 | Brett Deledio | Richmond |
| 2006 | Marc Murphy | Carlton |
| 2007 | Joel Selwood | Geelong |
| 2008 | Rhys Palmer | Fremantle |
| 2009 | Daniel Rich | Brisbane Lions |
| 2010 | Michael Barlow | Fremantle |
| 2011 | Dyson Heppell | Essendon |
| 2012 | Jeremy Cameron | Greater Western Sydney |
| 2013 | Jaeger O'Meara | Gold Coast |
| 2014 | Marcus Bontempelli | Western Bulldogs |
| 2015 | Isaac Heeney | Sydney |
| 2016 | Callum Mills | Sydney |
| 2017 | Andrew McGrath | Essendon |
| 2018 | Tim Kelly | Geelong |
| 2019 | Sam Walsh | Carlton |
| 2020 | Caleb Serong | Fremantle |
| 2021 | Errol Gulden | Sydney |
| 2022 | Nick Daicos | Collingwood |
| 2023 | Harry Sheezel | North Melbourne |
| 2024 | Harley Reid | West Coast |
| 2025 | Murphy Reid | Fremantle |
| 2026 | Harry Dean | Carlton |

AFL Women's

| Season | Player | Club |
|---|---|---|
| 2018 | Chloe Molloy | Collingwood |
| 2019 | Maddy Prespakis | Carlton |
| 2020 | Georgia Patrikios | St Kilda |
| 2021 | Ellie McKenzie | Richmond |
| 2022 (S6) | Charlie Rowbottom | Gold Coast |
| 2022 (S7) | Eilish Sheerin | Richmond |
| 2023 | Aishling Moloney | Geelong |
| 2024 | Shineah Goody | Port Adelaide |
| 2025 | Zippy Fish | Sydney |

=== Most courageous player ===
In the AFL, the award for most courageous player is called the Robert Rose Award. It has been awarded annually since 1991 to the most courageous player in the league. The award is named after the Australian sportsman Robert Rose, who became a quadriplegic in 1974 after a car accident. Glenn Archer has won the award most often (with six wins), while Paul Kelly won it five times, including four consecutively from 1994 to 1997. Jonathan Brown won the award in 2007, 2008 and 2011. In 2009, Joel Selwood won the award for the first time, and then won it three consecutive times from 2012 to 2014.

In the AFL Women's, the award has been given since the inaugural season in 2017. Chelsea Randall has won the award six times (in 2017, 2018, 2019, 2021, 2022 (S7) and 2024), the most of any player in the AFLW.

VFL/AFL (Robert Rose Award)

| Season | Player | Club |
|---|---|---|
| 1991 | Gavin Brown | Collingwood |
| 1992 | Gavin Brown (2) | Collingwood |
| 1993 | Gavin Wanganeen | Essendon |
| 1994 | Paul Kelly | Sydney |
| 1995 | Paul Kelly (2) | Sydney |
| 1996 | Paul Kelly (3) | Sydney |
| 1997 | Paul Kelly (4) | Sydney |
| 1998 | Glenn Archer | North Melbourne |
| 1999 | Glenn Archer (2) | Kangaroos |
| 2000 | Paul Kelly (5) | Sydney |
| 2001 | Michael Voss | Brisbane Lions |
| 2002 | Glenn Archer (3) | Kangaroos |
| 2003 | Glenn Archer (4) | Kangaroos |
| 2004 | David Teague | Carlton |
| 2005 | Glenn Archer (5) | Kangaroos |
| 2006 | Glenn Archer (6) | Kangaroos |
| 2006 | Brett Kirk | Sydney |
| 2007 | Jonathan Brown | Brisbane Lions |
| 2008 | Jonathan Brown (2) | Brisbane Lions |
| 2009 | Joel Selwood | Geelong |
| 2010 | Luke Hodge | Hawthorn |
| 2011 | Jonathan Brown (3) | Brisbane Lions |
| 2012 | Joel Selwood (2) | Geelong |
| 2012 | Beau Waters | West Coast |
| 2013 | Joel Selwood (3) | Geelong |
| 2014 | Joel Selwood (4) | Geelong |
| 2015 | Luke Parker | Sydney |
| 2016 | Luke Parker (2) | Sydney |
| 2017 | Rory Sloane | Adelaide |
| 2018 | Callan Ward | Greater Western Sydney |
| 2019 | Dylan Grimes | Richmond |
| 2020 | Dane Rampe | Sydney |
| 2021 | Jack Steele | St Kilda |
| 2022 | Liam Baker | Richmond |
| 2023 | Zak Butters | Port Adelaide |
| 2024 | Zak Butters (2) | Port Adelaide |
| 2025 | Josh Dunkley | Brisbane Lions |
| 2026 | Jordan Dawson | Adelaide |

AFL Women's

| Season | Player | Club |
|---|---|---|
| 2017 | Chelsea Randall | Adelaide |
| 2018 | Chelsea Randall (2) | Adelaide |
| 2019 | Chelsea Randall (3) | Adelaide |
| 2020 | Kiara Bowers | Fremantle |
| 2021 | Chelsea Randall (4) | Adelaide |
| 2022 (S6) | Kirsty Lamb | Western Bulldogs |
| 2022 (S7) | Chelsea Randall (5) | Adelaide |
| 2023 | Courtney Hodder | Brisbane |
| 2024 | Chelsea Randall (6) | Adelaide |
| 2025 | Kiara Bowers (2) | Fremantle |

== Other awards ==
The following awards are also currently or have previously been presented by the AFLPA.

=== Marn Grook Award ===
Named after the Indigenous game Marn Grook, the award was presented annually from 2001 to 2007 for the top emerging Indigenous player in the game, who must be within their first three seasons of AFL competition.

==== Winners ====
| Season | Player | Club |
|---|---|---|
| 2001 | Adam Goodes | Sydney |
| 2001 | Dean Rioli | Essendon |
| 2002 | Leon Davis | Collingwood |
| 2003 | Graham Johncock | Adelaide |
| 2004 | Daniel Wells | Kangaroos |
| 2005 | Aaron Davey | Melbourne |
| 2006 | Danyle Pearce | Port Adelaide |
| 2007 | Lance Franklin | Hawthorn |

=== Grant Hattam Award ===
The Grant Hattam Award has been awarded annually since 1999 to the most outstanding piece of football journalism for that year as voted by the players. All forms of media from all around Australia, covering the AFL, AFL Women's or any other football topic, are eligible for the award.

The award was created in honour and memory of the late Grant Hattam, who was a leading sports and media lawyer.

| Year | Journalist | Outlet | Nominated work |
|---|---|---|---|
| 1999 | Caroline Wilson | The Age | |
| 2000 | Mark Robinson | Herald Sun | |
| 2001 | Jake Niall | The Age | |
| 2002 | Mark Robinson (2) | Herald Sun | "The importance of being honest", newspaper article on Essendon's Dean Rioli |
| 2003 | Michael Gleeson | Herald Sun | "Search for Cole comfort", newspaper article on Collingwood's Richard Cole |
| 2004 | Michael Davis | The Australian | |
| 2005 | Jon Ralph | Herald Sun | |
| 2006 | Jason Bennett | Fox Footy Channel | Headliners: The Peter Crimmins Story, two-part television documentary series on late Hawthorn champion Peter Crimmins |
| 2007 | Samantha Lane | The Age | |
| 2008 | Mike Sheahan | Herald Sun | "Champ tells how he beat the odds", newspaper article on Adelaide midfielder Simon Goodwin's gambling addiction |
| 2009 | Emma Quayle | The Age | "A street named desire", newspaper article on then draft hopefuls Chris Yarran, Michael Walters and Nic Naitanui |
| 2010 | Scott Gullan | Herald Sun | "'I cried for hours'", newspaper article on Geelong forward Mathew Stokes' battle with drugs |
| 2011 | Sam Edmund | Herald Sun | "The tyranny of distance" / "The red centre's angry boys", two-part newspaper article on the plight of Indigenous footballers |
| 2012 | Emma Quayle (2) | The Age | "Short stories", newspaper article on the careers of Collingwood's Tom Hunter, St Kilda's Jarryd Allen and Essendon's Darcy Daniher |
| 2013 | Saturday Night Footy (Seven Sport) | | #Discovered: Jeremy Cameron, television feature piece on a day in the life of Greater Western Sydney forward Jeremy Cameron |
| 2014 | Michael Gleeson (2) | The Age (2) | "On a wing and a prayer with footy's faithful", newspaper article on the professional footballers who regularly practice religion |
| 2015 | Adrian Brown | Western Bulldogs | Sons of the West, five-part web documentary series on Bob Murphy and the Western Bulldogs' 2015 season |
| 2016 | Emma Quayle (3) | The Age | "'I needed to see what else was in the world'", newspaper article on Essendon forward Anthony McDonald-Tipungwuti |
| 2017 | Fox Footy | | Fyfe, six-part television documentary series on Fremantle midfielder Nat Fyfe's return from injury |
| 2018 | Neroli Meadows | Fox Footy | On the Mark with Hugh Greenwood, television feature piece on Adelaide midfielder Hugh Greenwood's ill mother |
| 2019 | Michael Gleeson (3) | The Age | "A feast of footy, family and religion", newspaper article on Essendon defender Adam Saad's practice of religion |
| 2020 | Russell Jackson | ABC News | "The persecution of Robert Muir is the story football doesn't want to hear", web article on the racial abuse and mistreatment of former St Kilda midfielder Robbie Muir |
| 2021 | Liz Walsh | The Advertiser | "It's a journey of discovery for us", newspaper article on North Melbourne players Kaitlyn Ashmore and Mia King's discovery of their Indigenous heritage |
| 2022 | Thursday Night Football (Seven Sport) | | Interview with Carlton player Sam Docherty on his return to football after having cancer |
| 2023 | Sarah Black | AFL Media | "'I'm a better mum because of it': Inside Garing's return to footy", web article on Geelong player Renee Garing's return to football after giving birth |
| 2024 | Lauren Wood | Herald Sun | "Geelong skipper Meg McDonald opens up about her family heartbreak as the Cats steel for preliminary final", article on Geelong player Meg McDonald and her late father |
| 2025 | Josh Gabelich | AFL Media | "For two hours each Monday, this Bulldogs champion helps kids with their homework", web article on Western Bulldogs player Tom Liberatore helping students with homework |

=== Education and Training Excellence Award ===
The Education and Training Excellence Award has been given annually since 2001 to the player who displays the best all-round performance in balancing football with external education and training. From 2001 to 2016, it was awarded to AFL players only. Since 2017, the award has been presented to at least one winner from both the AFL and AFL Women's each year.

AFL

| Year | Player | Club |
|---|---|---|
| 2001 | Paul Licuria | Collingwood |
| 2002 | Peter Bell | Fremantle |
| 2003 | Simon Garlick | Western Bulldogs |
| 2004 | Michael Wilson | Port Adelaide |
| 2005 | James Clement | Collingwood |
| 2006 | Josh Mahoney | Port Adelaide |
| 2007 | Brett Burton | Adelaide |
| 2007 | Shane Wakelin | Collingwood |
| 2008 | Jason Blake | St Kilda |
| 2009 | Max Hudghton | St Kilda |
| 2010 | Tim Callan | Western Bulldogs |
| 2011 | Henry Slattery | Essendon |
| 2012 | Alan Toovey | Collingwood |
| 2013 | Matthew Boyd | Western Bulldogs |
| 2014 | Jonathon Griffin | Fremantle |
| 2015 | Mike Pyke | Sydney |
| 2016 | Jamie Macmillan | North Melbourne |
| 2017 | Ed Curnow | Carlton |
| 2018 | David Mundy | Fremantle |
| 2019 | Isaac Smith | Hawthorn |
| 2020 | Harry Taylor | Geelong |
| 2020 | Todd Goldstein | North Melbourne |
| 2021 | Nathan Murphy | Collingwood |
| 2022 | Tom Cutler | Essendon |
| 2023 | Darcy Fort | Brisbane Lions |
| 2023 | Robbie Fox | Sydney |
| 2024 | Noah Answerth | Brisbane Lions |
| 2025 | Brayden Fiorini | Gold Coast |
| 2025 | Brodie Grundy | Sydney |

AFL Women's

| Year | Player | Club |
|---|---|---|
| 2017 | Renee Forth | Greater Western Sydney |
| 2018 | Tiarna Ernst | Western Bulldogs |
| 2019 | Kate Gillespie-Jones | North Melbourne |
| 2020 | Libby Birch | Melbourne |
| 2021 | Ellyse Gamble | Western Bulldogs |
| 2021 | Nina Morrison | Geelong |
| 2022 (Note: Only one award was given across the two 2022 AFLW seasons.) | Lexi Hamilton | Sydney (Note: Hamilton played for Sydney in 2022 season 7, during which the award was given. However, she played for North Melbourne in the season held earlier in 2022.) |
| 2023 | Madi Scanlon | Fremantle |
| 2024 | Jade Ellenger | Brisbane |
| 2025 | Jaide Britton | West Coast |

=== 22 Under 22 team ===
Each season, the AFLPA also names the 22 Under 22 team for both the AFL and AFL Women's. These are full teams of 22 (AFL) or 21 (AFL Women's) players. The AFLPA selects a team of 40, before the final team is selected by fans. To be eligible for selection, players must be aged 22 or under for the entire season (including finals). In the AFL, the first team was named in 2013, with a respective team also named for the 2012 season. In the AFL Women's, the first team was named in 2020, with a respective team named which covered the first three seasons from 2017 to 2019.

=== Mike Fitzpatrick Scholarships ===
Awarded annually to young aspiring non-AFL players, attempting to help them balance external study and training with football training.
