= Brent Harvey =

Australian rules footballer (born 1978)

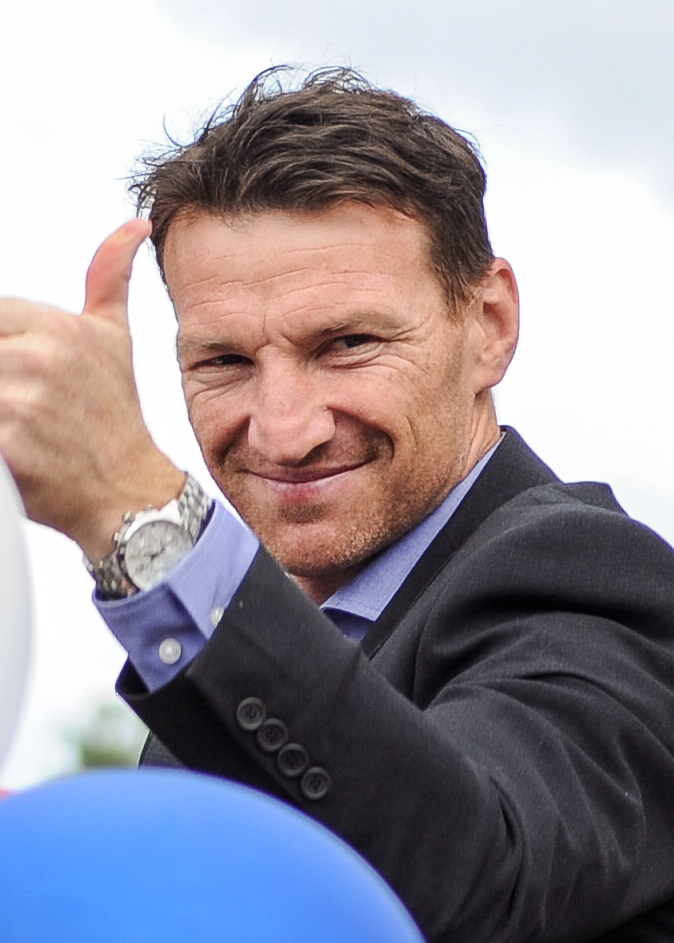
- Harvey at the 2017 AFL Grand Final parade

Personal information
- Full name: Brent Harvey
- Nickname: Boomer
- Born: 14 May 1978 (age 48); Preston, Victoria, Australia
- Original team: Preston RSL (Vic)/Northern Knights
- Draft: 47th overall, 1995; North Melbourne
- Height: 177 cm (5 ft 10 in)
- Weight: 75 kg (165 lb)
- Positions: Forward, Midfielder

Playing career^{1}
Years	Club	Games (Goals)
1996–2016	North Melbourne	432 (518)

Representative team honours^{2}
Years	Team	Games (Goals)
1999, 2008	Victoria	2 (8)

International team honours^{2}
2000–2008	Australia	11 (12)
- ^{1} Playing statistics correct to the end of 2016.^{2} Representative statistics correct as of 2008.

Career highlights
- North Melbourne Captain: 2009–2011; AFL premiership: 1999; 4x All-Australian team: 2000, 2005, 2007, 2008; 5x Syd Barker Medal: 2003, 2005, 2007, 2008, 2010; Herald Sun Player of the Year: 2008; 2x Lou Richards Medal: 2007, 2008; North Melbourne Team of the Century; E. J. Whitten Medal: 1999; Jim Stynes Medal: 2003; Captain of Australia: 2008; AFL Hall Of Fame: 2022; North Melbourne Games Record Holder: 432 games; NAB Cup (North Melbourne): 1998; AFL Reserves Premiership (North Melbourne): 1996

Brent Harvey (born 14 May 1978), often known by his nickname "Boomer", is a former Australian rules footballer who played for the North Melbourne Football Club in the Australian Football League (AFL). He played his entire career with North Melbourne, winning a premiership in 1999 and serving as captain from 2009 to 2011. He retired in 2016 having played 432 games, the most games played by an individual in VFL/AFL at the time. The record stood for 10 years until it was surpassed by Collingwood's Scott Pendlebury in Round 11 of the 2026 season.

== Career ==
Harvey was drafted by the North Melbourne Football Club in the third round of the 1995 AFL draft, debuting during the 1996 AFL season. In 1999, he was the recipient of the E. J. Whitten Medal for being judged as the best player for Victoria in the State of Origin series. He also helped North Melbourne win the premiership with a victory over Carlton in the 1999 AFL Grand Final.

In round 22 of the 2003 season, in what was his 150th game, Harvey kicked three goals in the Kangaroos' record-breaking 124-point victory over Carlton. That year, he won his first Syd Barker Medal as North Melbourne's best and fairest, and won the Jim Stynes Medal in the International rules series.

In 2007, Harvey polled 22 votes in the Brownlow Medal, finishing equal second. In 2008, he polled 17 votes to finish in eighth place. He later captained Australia in the 2008 International Rules Series.

In round three of 2010, Harvey led North Melbourne to a 25-point win over the West Coast Eagles with a career-best 44 disposals, along with 11 marks, six goal-scoring assists, and one goal.

In Round 12 of 2011, Harvey played his 312th game for North Melbourne to break Glenn Archer's club record.

In round 17 of 2015, Harvey played his 400th career game, and in round 19 of 2016, he played his 427th game to break Michael Tuck's VFL/AFL games record. In honour of Tuck's record, the Kangaroos had the number 427 on the vertical royal-blue bars of their guernseys, and the number 50 on the 50-metre arc was replaced by 29, the number Harvey wore for his entire AFL career.

In August 2016, North Melbourne announced they would not renew Harvey's contract for the 2017 season. He subsequently retired at the 2016 Syd Barker Medal night. At the time of the announcement, he was the VFL/AFL all-time leader in games played, with 432, and also ranked second for most premiership games in elite Australian rules football, only behind Craig Bradley (464, including 89 games in the SANFL with Port Adelaide).

As of 2025, only seven other players have achieved the feat of playing 400 elite Australian rules football (VFL/AFL, SANFL and WAFL) games: Kevin Bartlett, Peter Carey, Tuck, Bradley, Dustin Fletcher, Shaun Burgoyne, and Scott Pendlebury.

Harvey holds the record for most career bounces, with 1,055, and is the only player as of 2025 to have crossed the thousand-bounce threshold.

In 2022, Harvey was inducted into the Australian Football Hall of Fame in his first year of eligibility.

== Height ==
Prior to the 2014 season, Harvey was listed as 167 cm. Midway through 2014, his height was updated to 172 cm, and for the 2015 season, his height was updated to 175 cm. In the 2016 season, he was listed as 177 cm.

== Statistics ==
Legend
G	Goals	K	Kicks	D	Disposals	T	Tackles
B	Behinds	H	Handballs	M	Marks

Season	Team	No.	Games	Totals							Averages (per game)						
Season	Team	No.	Games	G	B	K	H	D	M	T	G	B	K	H	D	M	T
1996	North Melbourne	29	1	0	0	0	1	1	0	0	0.0	0.0	0.0	1.0	1.0	0.0	0.0
1997	North Melbourne	29	17	10	8	105	54	159	26	9	0.6	0.5	6.2	3.2	9.4	1.5	0.5
1998	North Melbourne	29	23	32	20	209	89	298	44	31	1.4	0.9	9.1	3.9	13.0	1.9	1.3
1999	North Melbourne	29	23	24	14	273	112	385	66	28	1.0	0.6	11.9	4.9	16.7	2.9	1.2
2000	North Melbourne	29	25	35	32	375	160	535	107	50	1.4	1.3	15.0	6.4	21.4	4.3	2.0
2001	North Melbourne	29	20	17	19	338	172	510	75	29	0.9	1.0	16.9	8.6	25.5	3.8	1.5
2002	North Melbourne	29	20	30	12	296	133	429	65	45	1.5	0.6	14.8	6.7	21.5	3.3	2.3
2003	North Melbourne	29	21	28	20	314	137	451	94	38	1.3	1.0	15.0	6.5	21.5	4.5	1.8
2004	North Melbourne	29	21	30	13	218	117	335	71	37	1.4	0.6	10.4	5.6	16.0	3.4	1.8
2005	North Melbourne	29	23	23	17	325	188	513	108	49	1.0	0.7	14.1	8.2	22.3	4.7	2.1
2006	North Melbourne	29	22	17	11	335	195	530	121	46	0.8	0.5	15.2	8.9	24.1	5.5	2.1
2007	North Melbourne	29	25	36	17	351	243	594	116	53	1.4	0.7	14.0	9.7	23.8	4.6	2.1
2008	North Melbourne	29	23	25	19	339	230	569	110	54	1.1	0.8	14.7	10.0	24.7	4.8	2.3
2009	North Melbourne	29	15	12	8	193	142	335	62	31	0.8	0.5	12.9	9.5	22.3	4.1	2.1
2010	North Melbourne	29	22	25	22	313	234	547	92	63	1.1	1.0	14.2	10.6	24.9	4.2	2.9
2011	North Melbourne	29	22	31	25	304	188	492	80	59	1.4	1.1	13.8	8.5	22.4	3.6	2.7
2012	North Melbourne	29	23	35	9	285	235	520	99	47	1.5	0.4	12.4	10.2	22.6	4.3	2.0
2013	North Melbourne	29	16	19	9	210	175	385	75	43	1.2	0.6	13.1	10.9	24.1	4.7	2.7
2014	North Melbourne	29	22	29	20	310	249	559	106	66	1.3	0.9	14.1	11.3	25.4	4.8	3.0
2015	North Melbourne	29	25	24	15	304	266	570	74	53	1.0	0.6	12.2	10.6	22.8	3.0	2.1
2016	North Melbourne	29	23	36	24	290	206	496	98	56	1.6	0.7	12.6	9.0	21.6	4.3	2.4
Career			432	518	334	5687	3526	9213	1689	887	1.2	0.7	13.1	8.1	21.3	3.9	2.0

== Honours and achievements ==
Brownlow Medal votes
Season	Votes
1996	0
1997	0
1998	4
1999	6
2000	14
2001	16
2002	10
2003	16
2004	3
2005	11
2006	6
2007	22
2008	17
2009	9
2010	13
2011	8
2012	4
2013	9
2014	15
2015	4
2016	4
Total	191
Key:
Red / Italics = Ineligible

- Team
  - AFL Premiership (Kangaroos): 1999
  - McClelland Trophy (North Melbourne): 1998
  - NAB Cup (North Melbourne): 1998
  - AFL Reserves Premiership (North Melbourne): 1996
- Individual
  - E. J. Whitten Medal: 1999
  - Syd Barker Medal: 2003, 2005, 2007, 2008, 2010 (tied with Brady Rawlings)
  - All-Australian: 2000, 2005, 2007, 2008
  - Australian Representative Honours in International Rules Football: 2000, 2001, 2003, 2005, 2008 (C)
  - Jim Stynes Medal: 2003
  - Lou Richards Medal: 2007, 2008
  - Herald Sun Player of the Year: 2008
  - Archer–Hird Medal: 2009, 2011
  - North Melbourne F.C. Team of the Century
  - AFL Hall Of Fame (2022 Class)
  - North Melbourne Games Record Holder: 432

== Personal life ==
Harvey's grandfather Bill Harvey played two games for North Melbourne in 1948. His brother, Shane Harvey, played 14 games for Essendon and North Melbourne from 2002 to 2004.

In April 2023, Harvey broke his leg playing for North Heidelberg in the Northern Football League.

== See also ==
- List of VFL/AFL players to have played 300 games
- List of VFL/AFL records
