= Leigh Matthews Trophy =

Award for most valuable player in the Australian Football League

The Leigh Matthews Trophy is an annual award given by the AFL Players Association to the Most Valuable Player in the Australian Football League. It is named in honour of Leigh Matthews, who won the first MVP award in 1982, when the league was still known as the Victorian Football League. The trophy was first awarded in 2002, and all previous VFLPA/AFLPA MVPs were retrospectively given the Matthews Trophy in 2005. It is awarded at a special AFL Players Association awards ceremony.

The voting procedure for the award is:

- At the end of the regular season, each team votes for three players (previously two) to be considered for election.
- Two weeks into the finals, the AFLPA sends a final ballot to all players throughout the league. Players cannot vote for their own teammates; in fact, the ballots sent to each team are redacted to remove that team's nominees. Each player awards three votes to the player he believes is the best in the league, two votes to the second-best, and one vote to the third-best. The leading vote-getter receives the trophy.

Prior to 2011, each player cast a single vote for the award.

The award is roughly analogous to the Brownlow Medal, the traditional "best and fairest" award in the league. However, the voting system is completely different: the Brownlow Medal awards votes on a game-by-game basis, while Leigh Matthews Trophy awards a single vote based on the entire season. In particular, this has meant that key-position players have been more likely to win this award than the Brownlow Medal. For example, Wayne Carey, generally regarded as one of the league's all-time great key-position players, never won the Brownlow Medal, but he won this honour twice.

The Leigh Matthews Trophy is strictly for the most valuable player, not the best and fairest as is the case with the Brownlow Medal. A league disciplinary suspension, which renders a player ineligible for the Brownlow, does not exclude a player from contention for the Matthews Trophy. In 1996, Corey McKernan finished tied in the Brownlow voting with that season's winners James Hird and Michael Voss, but he was disqualified from the Brownlow because of a disciplinary suspension. However, McKernan won the AFLPA MVP award that season.

== Winners ==
Year	Player	Team
1982	Leigh Matthews	Hawthorn
1983	Terry Daniher	Essendon
1984	Russell Greene	Hawthorn
1985	Greg Williams	Geelong
1986	Paul Roos	Fitzroy
1987	Tony Lockett	St Kilda
1988	Gerard Healy	Sydney
1989	Tim Watson	Essendon
1990	Darren Millane	Collingwood
1991	Jim Stynes	Melbourne
1992	Jason Dunstall	Hawthorn
1993	Gary Ablett Sr.	Geelong
1994	Greg Williams (2)	Carlton
1995	Wayne Carey	North Melbourne
1996	Corey McKernan	North Melbourne
1997	Robert Harvey	St Kilda
1998	Wayne Carey (2)	North Melbourne
1999	Shane Crawford	Hawthorn
2000	Anthony Koutoufides	Carlton
2001	Andrew McLeod	Adelaide
2002	Luke Darcy	Western Bulldogs
2002	Michael Voss	Brisbane Lions
2003	Michael Voss (2)	Brisbane Lions
2004	Nick Riewoldt	St Kilda
2005	Ben Cousins	West Coast
2006	Chris Judd	West Coast
2007	Gary Ablett Jr.	Geelong
2008	Gary Ablett Jr. (2)	Geelong
2009	Gary Ablett Jr. (3)	Geelong
2010	Dane Swan	Collingwood
2011	Chris Judd (2)	Carlton
2012	Gary Ablett Jr. (4)	Gold Coast
2013	Gary Ablett Jr. (5)	Gold Coast
2014	Nat Fyfe	Fremantle
2015	Nat Fyfe (2)	Fremantle
2016	Patrick Dangerfield	Geelong
2017	Dustin Martin	Richmond
2018	Tom Mitchell	Hawthorn
2019	Patrick Cripps	Carlton
2020	Lachie Neale	Brisbane Lions
2021	Marcus Bontempelli	Western Bulldogs
2022	Andrew Brayshaw	Fremantle
2023	Marcus Bontempelli (2)	Western Bulldogs
2024	Marcus Bontempelli (3)	Western Bulldogs
2025	Nick Daicos	Collingwood
2026	Nick Daicos (2)	Collingwood

== Multiple winners ==
The following players have won the Leigh Matthews Trophy multiple times.

Wins	Player	Seasons
5	Gary Ablett Jr.	2007, 2008, 2009, 2012, 2013
3	Marcus Bontempelli	2021, 2023, 2024
2	Greg Williams	1985, 1994
2	Wayne Carey	1995, 1998
2	Michael Voss	2002, 2003
2	Chris Judd	2006, 2011
2	Nat Fyfe	2014, 2015
2	Nick Daicos	2025, 2026

== See also ==
- Athlete of the Year
