= Herald Sun Player of the Year =

Award by newspaper given to Australian Football players

- Description: Media award for the Australian Football League based on weekly journalist votes
- Country: Australia
- Presented by: Herald Sun

The Herald Sun Player of the Year award is a media award for the Australian Football League (AFL) given by Melbourne newspaper the Herald Sun. It has been awarded annually since 1991. In each game throughout the season, a selected Herald Sun journalist awarding five votes to the player they judge to be the "best on ground", four votes to the second-best player, three votes to the third-best player, two votes to the fourth-best player and one vote for the fifth best player. The player who garners the most votes throughout the season is the winner.

== Winners ==
Year	Player	Club
1991	Jim Stynes	Melbourne
1992	Scott Wynd	Footscray
1993	Greg Williams	Carlton
1994	Greg Williams	Carlton
1995	Nicky Winmar	St Kilda
1996	Nathan Burke	St Kilda
1997	Robert Harvey	St Kilda
1998	Nathan Buckley	Collingwood
1999	Shane Crawford	Hawthorn
2000	Anthony Koutoufides	Carlton
2001	Simon Black	Brisbane Lions
2002	Luke Darcy	Western Bulldogs
2003	Michael Voss	Brisbane Lions
2004	Warren Tredrea	Port Adelaide
2005	Ben Cousins	West Coast
2006	Adam Goodes	Sydney
2007	Gary Ablett, Jr.	Geelong
2008	Brent Harvey	North Melbourne
2009	Dane Swan	Collingwood
2010	Dane Swan	Collingwood
2011	Sam Mitchell	Hawthorn
2012	Gary Ablett Jr.	Gold Coast
2013	Gary Ablett Jr. Nat Fyfe	Gold Coast; Fremantle
2014	Joel Selwood	Geelong
2015	Nat Fyfe	Fremantle
2016	Patrick Dangerfield	Geelong
2017	Dustin Martin	Richmond
2018	Brodie Grundy	Collingwood
2019	Marcus Bontempelli	Western Bulldogs
2020	Lachie Neale	Brisbane Lions
2021	Ollie Wines	Port Adelaide
2022	Lachie Neale	Brisbane Lions
2023	Caleb Serong	Fremantle
2024	Patrick Cripps	Carlton
2025	Nick Daicos	Collingwood
2026	Nick Daicos	Collingwood
