= 2026 Brownlow Medal =

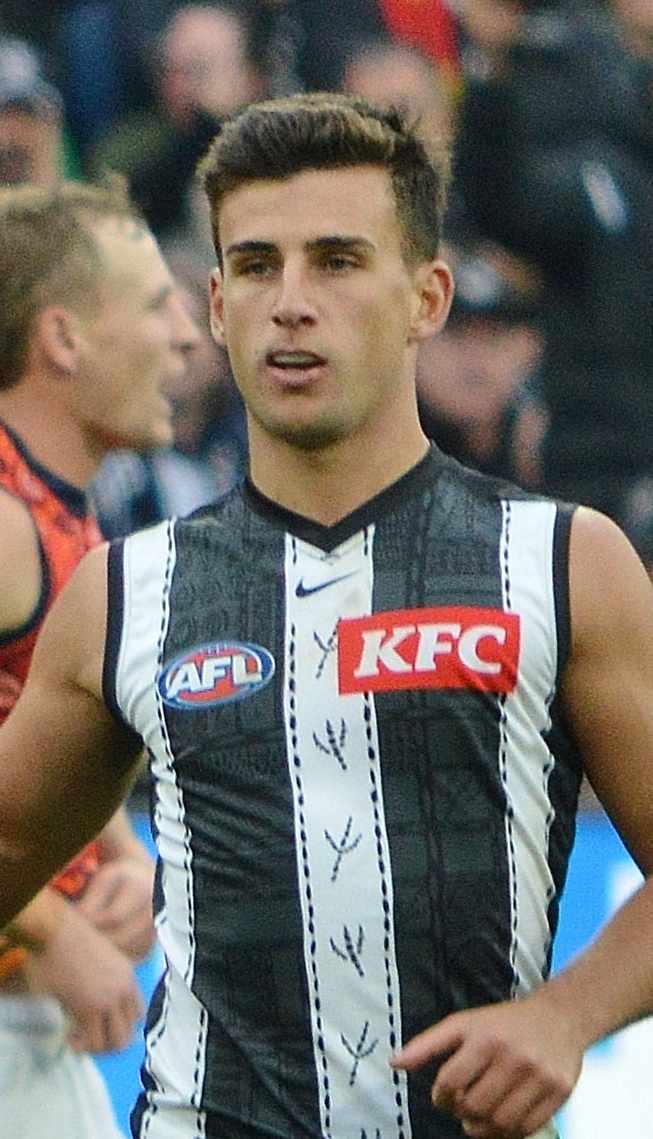
- 2026 Brownlow Medallist, Nick Daicos
- Date: Monday, 21 September 2026
- Location: Crown Palladium
- Hosted by: Hamish McLachlan and Rebecca Maddern
- Winner: Nick Daicos (Collingwood)

Television/radio coverage
- Network: Seven Network

The 2026 Brownlow Medal was the 99th year in which the award was presented to the player adjudged the best and fairest player during the Australian Football League (AFL) home-and-away season. The count took place on Monday 21 September in Melbourne at the Crown Palladium, five days before the grand final. Nick Daicos of Collingwood won the medal with 47 votes

== Reactions ==
Daicos won the medal with 47 votes, polling the highest voting score of all time under the 3-2-1 system. This beat 2024 winner Patrick Cripps by two votes. Daicos had been the outright favourite to win the award for the majority of the season, in which he averaged just under 35 disposals per game and kicked 26 goals.

=== Sydney Swans ===
Four days before Round 24, five Sydney players were suspended by the club for the remainder of the season, for breaching club rules and standards the night after a Round 23 match against Essendon. One of these players was Isaac Heeney, a favourite to win the award. The AFL ruled that since it was a club suspension, they would still be eligible to win the medal, though due to the ongoing police investigation against them, the four did not attend the ceremony. The Sydney Swans CEO Matthew Pavlich had been set to deliver a speech written by Heeney, if he had won the award.

== Other awards ==
The 2026 Goal of the Year was awarded to Conor McKenna from the Brisbane Lions for his goal in the clubs round 24 win against Collingwood. McKenna beat runner up Bailey Williams from the Western Bulldogs in his goal in their opening round game against the Brisbane Lions.

The 2026 Mark of the Year was awarded to Nick Watson from Hawthorn in the Hawks round 24 win against West Coast. Watson beat runners up Kysaiah Pickett and Shai Bolton.

The Jim Stynes Community Leadership Award was awarded to Fremantle's Bailey Banfield.

== Records broken ==
On the night, multiple records were broken including:

- Nick Daicos received the highest number of votes in a single season.
- Nick Daicos polled Best on Ground, six consecutive times between Rounds 15 and 20, surpassing five players who were best on ground five times in a row, with the most recent player being 2025 winner Matt Rowell across late 2024 and early 2025.
- Daicos' winning margin of 11 votes was the equal biggest winning margin in Brownlow history.
- Western Bulldogs captain Marcus Bontempelli claimed the record of most votes in Brownlow history without winning the medal.
- Geelong captain Patrick Dangerfield tied former teammate Gary Ablett Jr. for the most votes in Brownlow history with 262.
- North Melbourne's Harry Sheezel achieved the most votes by a North Melbourne player in 43 years, since Ross Glendinning won in 1983
- Melbourne captain Max Gawn reached 150 career Brownlow votes, overtaking Robert Flower to become Melbourne's all time leading vote getter.

== Leading vote-getters ==
=== Overall ===
Rank	Player	Club	Votes
1st	Nick Daicos	Collingwood	47
2nd	Bailey Smith	Geelong	36
3rd	Marcus Bontempelli	Western Bulldogs	34
4th	Max Gawn	Melbourne	28
=5th	Will Ashcroft	Brisbane Lions	27
=5th	Patrick Cripps	Carlton	27
=5th	Harry Sheezel	North Melbourne	27
=8th	Zak Butters	Port Adelaide	26
=8th	Isaac Heeney	Sydney	26
10th	Izak Rankine	Adelaide	25

=== Most votes per club ===
Club rank	Overall rank (Note: Taking into account eligibility, i.e. excluding suspended players)	Player	Club	Votes
1st	1st	Nick Daicos	Collingwood	47
2nd	2nd	Bailey Smith	Geelong	36
3rd	3rd	Marcus Bontempelli	Western Bulldogs	34
4th	4th	Max Gawn	Melbourne	28
=5th	=5th	Will Ashcroft	Brisbane Lions	27
=5th	=5th	Patrick Cripps	Carlton	27
=5th	=5th	Harry Sheezel	North Melbourne	27
=8th	=8th	Zak Butters	Port Adelaide	26
=8th	=8th	Isaac Heeney	Sydney	26
10th	10th	Izak Rankine	Adelaide	25
11th	11th	Clayton Oliver	Greater Western Sydney	23
=12th	=13th	Jai Newcombe	Hawthorn	21
=12th	=13th	Nasiah Wanganeen-Milera	St Kilda	21
14th	=18th	Luke Jackson	Fremantle	19
15th	=23rd	Noah Anderson	Gold Coast	15
15th	=23rd	Christian Petracca	Gold Coast	15
16th	=38th	Tim Taranto	Richmond	10
17th	=45th	Zach Merrett	Essendon	9
18th*	=62nd	Jake Waterman	West Coast	6

- Harley Reid polled the most votes for West Coast with 15, however he was inelgible for the award due to suspension.

== Voting procedure and eligibility ==
The four field umpires (those umpires who control the flow of the game, as opposed to goal or boundary umpires) confer after each match and award three votes, two votes, and one vote to the players they regard as the best, second-best and third-best in the match, respectively. The votes are kept secret until the awards night, and they are read and tallied on the evening.

Any suspension throughout the home-and-away season renders a player ineligible to win the award. However, umpires must still award votes to any player they deem worthy, and all votes are tallied regardless of ineligibility.

In the event of an ineligible player receiving the most votes, the next eligible player is awarded the Brownlow Medal.

There is no countback if there is a tie on votes, with joint winners awarded.

Starting from 2026, umpires were given access to match statistics to help inform their voting
