= Nick Daicos =

Australian rules footballer (born 2003)

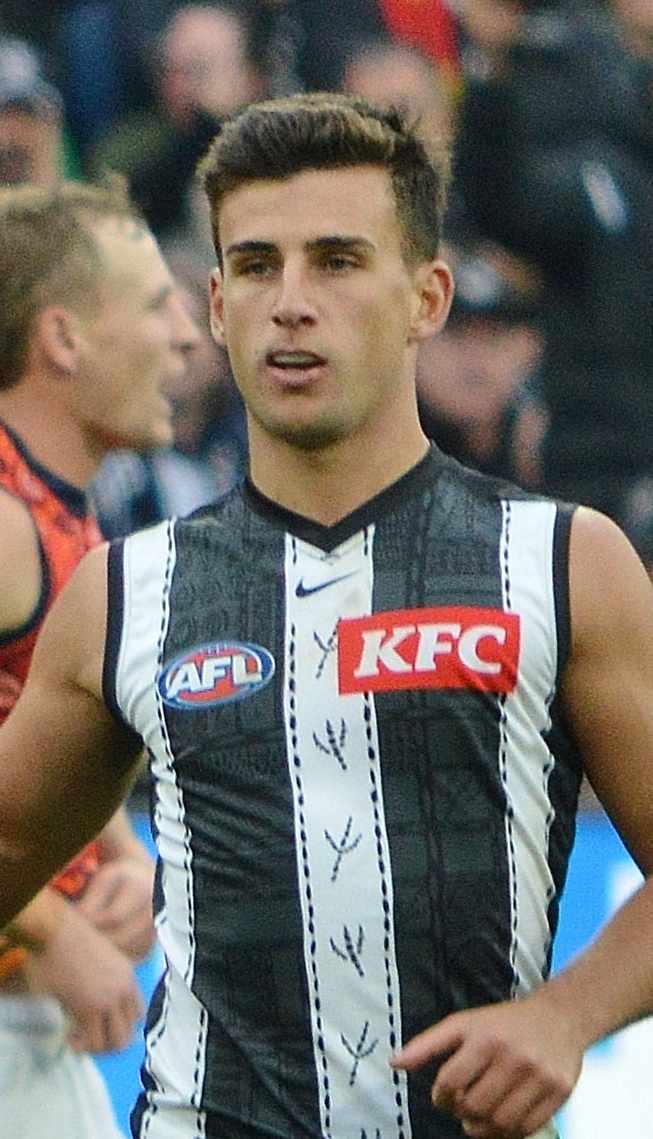
- Daicos in May 2025

Personal information
- Full name: Nicholas Daicos
- Nickname: Whisper
- Born: 3 January 2003 (age 23); Victoria
- Original team: Oakleigh Chargers (NAB League)
- Draft: No. 4 (F/S), 2021 national draft
- Debut: Round 1, 2022, Collingwood vs. St Kilda, at Marvel Stadium
- Height: 184 cm (6 ft 0 in)
- Weight: 79 kg (174 lb)
- Position: Midfielder

Club information
- Current club: Collingwood
- Number: 35

Playing career^{1}
| Years | Club | Games (Goals) |
| 2022– | Collingwood | 118 (89) |

Representative team honours^{2}
| Years | Team | Games (Goals) |
| 2026– | Victoria | 1 (1) |
- ^{1} Playing statistics correct to the end of the 2026 season.^{2} Representative statistics correct as of 2026.

Career highlights
- AFL premiership player: 2023; Brownlow Medal: 2026; 2× Leigh Matthews Trophy: 2025, 2026; 2× AFLCA champion player of the year award: 2024, 2026; 4× All-Australian team: 2023, 2024, 2025, 2026; 2x Lou Richards Medal: 2025, 2026; 2x Herald Sun Player of the Year: 2025, 2026; 2x Copeland Trophy: 2024, 2026; AFL Rising Star: 2022; AFLPA Best First Year Player: 2022; AFLCA Best Young Player: 2023; Anzac Day Medal: 2023; 4x 22under22 team: 2022, 2023 (c), 2024 (c), 2025 (c)

Nicholas Daicos (born 3 January 2003) is a professional Australian rules footballer who plays as a midfielder for Collingwood in the Australian Football League (AFL). He was recruited by Collingwood under the father–son rule with the fourth pick in the 2021 national draft, and made his debut in the first round of the 2022 season. Daicos is considered by many to be the best player in the AFL.

He is a premiership player, Brownlow Medallist, two-time Leigh Matthews Trophy winner, two-time AFLCA champion player of the year award winner, two-time Copeland Trophy winner and four-time All-Australian. Daicos holds the record for most Brownlow votes in a season (47), Coaches votes in a season (147) and is also the only unanimous winner of the Rising Star award with a record 60 votes.

== Early life and junior football ==
Daicos played his under-18 football with the Oakleigh Chargers and captained the team in the 2021 NAB League. He impressed across five matches, averaging 35.8 disposals and 2 goals per game. Noted for his consistency and clean skills, Daicos was tipped for a high pick in the 2021 AFL draft. In 2019, he was part of a school football premiership for Carey Grammar, alongside future AFL stars Matt Rowell and Noah Anderson. In his younger years, he played community football for Greythorn Falcons and Kew Rovers in the Yarra Junior Football League.

== AFL career ==
=== 2022 ===
In 2021, Daicos was drafted to the Collingwood Football Club as a father–son pick, following in the footsteps of his father, Peter Daicos, who played for the club from 1979 to 1993. He chose to wear 35 as his guernsey number, the same number worn by his father. Daicos was the subject of widespread media attention prior to his drafting, due to his potential to provide a much-needed contribution to a Collingwood side that finished second-last on the ladder in the 2021 Season.

Daicos made his AFL debut in Round 1 of the 2022 AFL season. In the win against St Kilda at Marvel Stadium, he produced an impressive 27 disposals, 10 contested possessions, and 5 marks.

Over the subsequent rounds, Daicos continued to impress as a rookie. In Round 3 against Geelong, Daicos earned a Rising Star nomination after collecting 26 disposals and kicking his first goal at the AFL level. A Round 18 win against Adelaide saw Daicos earn a season-high 40 disposals, while also kicking 3 goals. In the 2022 AFL Finals, Daicos played in his first finals series, where he continued his impressive performances with an average of 24 disposals across three games until the Magpies' season was ended by the Sydney Swans in a 94–95 defeat at the Sydney Cricket Ground during the Preliminary Final.

Throughout the 2022 season, Daicos’s performance was considered one of the most impactful and talented rookie seasons of all time, averaging 25.7 disposals per game while primarily playing in the half-back position. For his outstanding performance, he was awarded the Rising Star award given to the AFL’s best young player. Daicos received an all-time record 60 votes for the award, the first ever unanimous winner, surpassing Sam Walsh’s previous record of 54 in 2019, and finishing above Geelong’s runner-up Sam De Koning (48 votes) and fellow Magpie Jack Ginnivan (21 votes) for the 2022 season.

=== 2023 ===
Daicos began his second professional season with 35 disposals and 7 marks in a Round 1 win against Geelong.

In Round 6, during the annual Anzac Day Clash between the Collingwood and Essendon football clubs, Daicos was awarded the Anzac Medal for his best-on-ground performance where he produced 40 disposals, six marks, and two goals in the Magpies' comeback victory against the Bombers. After the bye rounds, Daicos slowly shifted to playing an on-ball role, flagging this with a best-on-ground performance against the Gold Coast Suns in round 16, with 36 disposals, 10 tackles and seven clearances. Showing promising signs as an on-baller, he signed a lucrative 4-year extension to his contract alongside his brother Josh Daicos until the end of 2029 (and Josh until the end of 2030).

In Collingwood's Round 21 clash against Hawthorn, Daicos was tagged by Hawks midfielder Finn Maginness and was kept to a career-low 5 disposals. During the same game, he was subjected to a bump from Hawks defender James Blanck which caused a hairline fracture in the lateral tibial plateau of the right knee joint, ruling him out for the rest of the home-and-away season, and for Collingwood's first final.

At the end of season awards, Daicos was awarded with the AFLCA's Best Young Player award for 2023 with 129 votes. He also achieved 3rd in the 2023 AFLCA's Champion Player of the Year award, trailing winner Zak Butters by 10 votes. He was also named as the starting Rover in the 2023 All-Australian team. In the 2023 Brownlow Medal awards night, Daicos came 3rd with 28 votes (the most of any second-year player in the AFL era), narrowly behind winner Lachie Neale, who polled 31 votes, and Marcus Bontempelli, who polled 29 votes.

After missing Collingwood's qualifying final victory over Melbourne while recovering from his knee injury, Daicos returned for the preliminary final against Greater Western Sydney, just 48 days after suffering the fracture. In his first game back, he recorded 28 disposals and six clearances as Collingwood defeated the Giants by one point to advance to the 2023 AFL Grand Final. The following week, Daicos won his first AFL premiership as Collingwood defeated Brisbane by four points. He recorded a game-high 29 disposals and kicked the opening goal of the match, receiving four Norm Smith Medal votes to finish third in the voting.

=== 2024 ===
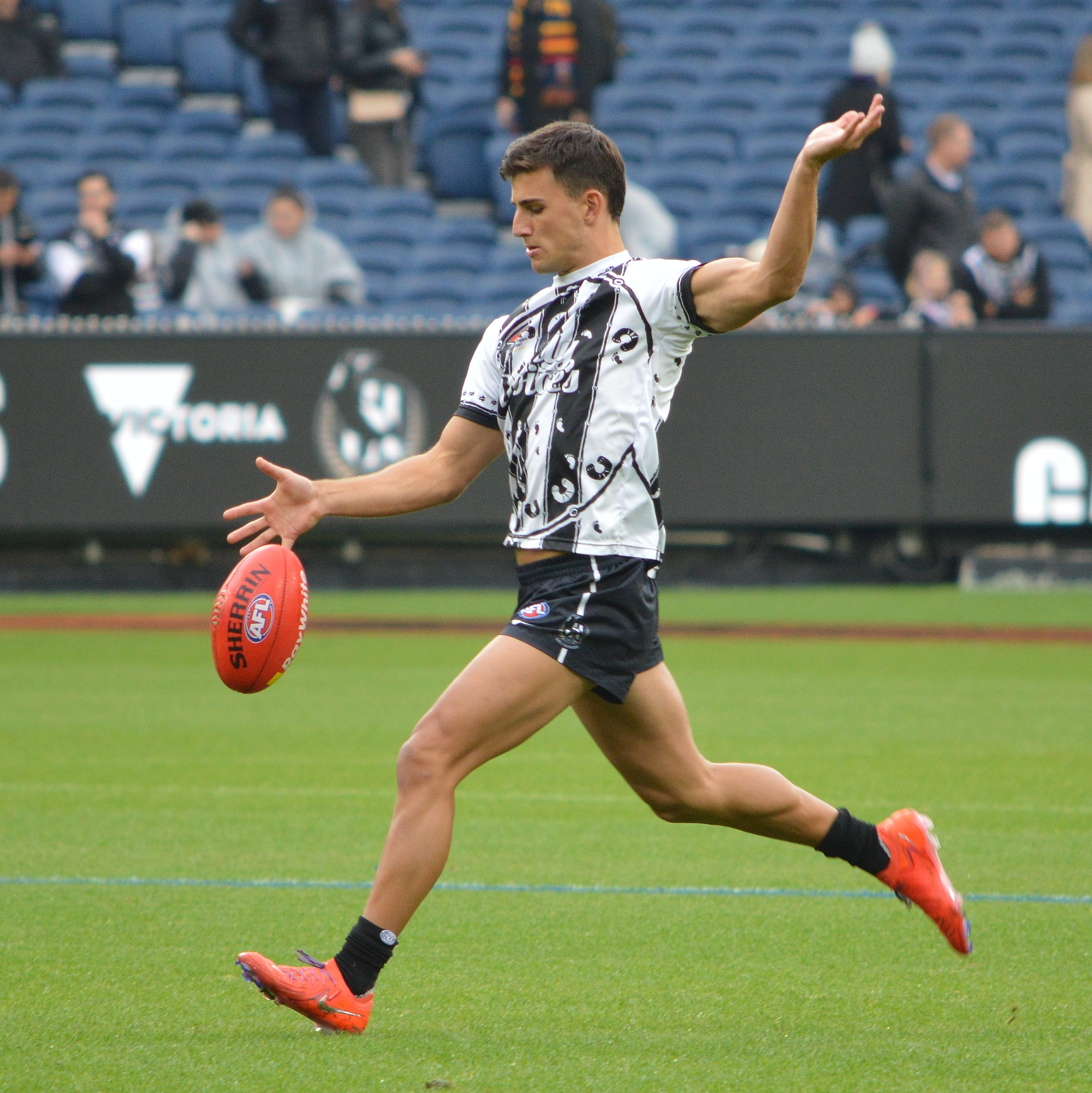
Daicos during the round 10, 2025 AFL match between Collingwood and Adelaide at the MCG.

In round 8 of the 2024 season, Daicos kicked the winning goal of Collingwood's match against Carlton. He finished the match with 32 disposals and 2 goals, for which he was awarded the Richard Pratt Medal.

In round 12 against the Western Bulldogs, Daicos accumulated 27 contested possessions and 16 clearances, breaking the club record in both statistical categories. In the same match, he became the fastest player, by matches played, to record 30 disposals in a match against all 17 other clubs.

Daicos placed second in the 2024 Brownlow Medal count, polling 38 votes. Both he and the Brownlow winner, Patrick Cripps, broke the record for the most votes ever received under the 3-2-1 voting system.

=== 2025 ===
Daicos produced another highly decorated season in 2025, further establishing himself among the competition's leading midfielders. He played 23 matches during the home-and-away season, averaging 30 disposals while also ranking among the AFL's leading players for clearances, inside 50s and score assists. He kicked 16 goals during the home-and-away season as Collingwood returned to the finals.

Daicos began the season strongly and moved into the lead of the AFL Coaches Association Champion Player of the Year Award after receiving the maximum ten coaches' votes for his performance against Brisbane in round six. Later in the season, he recorded 43 disposals against Fremantle in round 19, earning eight coaches' votes and regaining the lead in the award at that stage of the season.

At the conclusion of the home-and-away season, Daicos was awarded the Leigh Matthews Trophy as the AFL Players' Association Most Valuable Player, becoming the first Collingwood AFL player to win the award since Dane Swan in 2010. At 22 years of age, he was the youngest winner since Nick Riewoldt in 2004 and the fourth-youngest recipient in the award's history. He finished ahead of Adelaide captain Jordan Dawson and St Kilda's Nasiah Wanganeen-Milera in the player vote.

Daicos was also named in the 2025 All-Australian team, earning his third consecutive selection after previously being selected in 2023 and 2024.

Collingwood advanced to a preliminary final during the 2025 finals series before being eliminated by Brisbane by 29 points. Daicos finished the season having played 25 matches, averaging 30 disposals, 10.5 contested possessions, 6.2 clearances and 6.1 inside 50s per game.

At the 2025 Brownlow Medal, Daicos polled 32 votes and finished runner-up to Gold Coast midfielder Matt Rowell, who won the medal with 39 votes. It marked Daicos' third consecutive podium finish in the Brownlow Medal count and increased his career tally to 109 votes.

Daicos later finished runner-up in Collingwood's Copeland Trophy, polling 315 votes behind ruckman Darcy Cameron's 328.

=== 2026 ===
Daicos represented Victoria in the 2026 State of Origin match vs Western Australia. He finished the game with 38 disposals, 10 contested possessions, 7 clearances, 1 goal, 4 goal assists and 13 score involvements helping Victoria win 125-101.

Daicos continued to establish himself as one of the leading players in the AFL during the 2026 season. Playing predominantly as a midfielder, he appeared in 22 of Collingwood's 23 home-and-away matches, averaging a career-high 34.9 disposals, 10.7 contested possessions, 5.7 clearances, 6.7 inside 50s and 9.0 score involvements per game, while kicking 24 goals. He recorded at least 30 disposals in 18 of his 22 home-and-away appearances, including three matches with 40 or more disposals.

Daicos produced several notable performances throughout the season. In round 16 against Richmond, he recorded 37 disposals and kicked three goals, receiving the maximum ten AFL Coaches Association votes. In round 22 against West Coast, he collected 39 disposals, ten clearances and a goal, again receiving ten coaches' votes.

He won the AFL Coaches Association for the second time, having previously won the award in 2024. Daicos finished the home-and-away season with a record 147 votes, 38 ahead of runner-up Marcus Bontempelli. His tally surpassed Dustin Martin's previous single-season record of 122 votes, set in 2017. Daicos polled coaches' votes in 20 matches during the season and received the maximum ten votes on eight occasions.

Daicos was also awarded his second consecutive Leigh Matthews Trophy as the AFL Players' Association Most Valuable Player, becoming the youngest player to win the award multiple times and the first Collingwood player to do so. He was selected as the rover in the 2026 All-Australian team, marking his fourth consecutive All-Australian selection following his selections in 2023, 2024 and 2025.

Collingwood finished the home-and-away season in ninth position with 12 wins and two draws, qualifying for the inaugural wildcard finals series. The club faced the eighth-placed Western Bulldogs at the Melbourne Cricket Ground on 28 August. Daicos recorded 30 disposals, four clearances and two goals in the match, but Collingwood was eliminated after losing by three points, 14.12 (96) to 14.9 (93).

At the 2026 Brownlow Medal, Daicos won his first Brownlow Medal, polling a record 47 votes. He finished 11 votes ahead of runner-up Bailey Smith, equalling the record for the largest winning margin in Brownlow Medal history. Daicos polled votes in 18 of his 22 eligible matches, including 13 best-on-ground performances and a record six consecutive 3-vote games. He also became the first player in Brownlow Medal history to poll more than 30 votes in three separate seasons, following totals of 38 votes in 2024 and 32 in 2025. The victory made Daicos the tenth Collingwood player to win the Brownlow Medal and the club's first winner since Dane Swan in 2011. He also became the fifth player to win the Brownlow Medal, Leigh Matthews Trophy and AFL Coaches Association Champion Player of the Year in the same season.

== Statistics ==
Updated to the end of wildcard round, 2026.

Legend
| G | Goals | K | Kicks | D | Disposals | T | Tackles |
| B | Behinds | H | Handballs | M | Marks |
| # | Played in that season's premiership team | † | Led the league for the season | ± | Won that season's Brownlow Medal |

| Season | Team | No. | Games | Totals | | | | | | | Averages (per game) | | | | | | | Votes |
| Season | Team | No. | Games | G | B | K | H | D | M | T | G | B | K | H | D | M | T | Votes |
|---|---|---|---|---|---|---|---|---|---|---|---|---|---|---|---|---|---|---|
| 2022 | Collingwood | 35 | 25 | 7 | 7 | 361 | 283 | 644 | 102 | 54 | 0.3 | 0.3 | 14.4 | 11.3 | 25.8 | 4.1 | 2.2 | 11 |
| 2023^{#} | Collingwood | 35 | 22 | 19 | 13 | 357 | 325 | 682 | 71 | 84 | 0.9 | 0.6 | 16.2 | 14.8 | 31.0 | 3.2 | 3.8 | 28 |
| 2024 | Collingwood | 35 | 23 | 20 | 14 | 381 | 324 | 705 | 68 | 87 | 0.9 | 0.6 | 16.6 | 14.1 | 30.7 | 3.0 | 3.8 | 38 |
| 2025 | Collingwood | 35 | 25 | 17 | 20 | 419 | 331 | 750 | 101 | 98 | 0.7 | 0.8 | 16.8 | 13.2 | 30.0 | 4.0 | 3.9 | 32 |
| 2026 | Collingwood | 35 | 23 | 26 | 20 | 432 | 365 | 797^{†} | 92 | 58 | 1.1 | 0.8 | 18.8 | 15.9 | 34.7^{†} | 4.0 | 2.5 | 47^{±} |
| Career | | | 118 | 89 | 74 | 1950 | 1628 | 3578 | 434 | 381 | 0.7 | 0.6 | 16.5 | 13.8 | 30.3 | 3.7 | 3.2 | 156 |

== Honours and achievements ==
=== Team ===
- AFL premiership player: 2023 (Collingwood)
- AFL minor premiership: 2023 (Collingwood)

=== Individual ===
- Brownlow Medal: 2026
- 2× Leigh Matthews Trophy: 2025, 2026
- 2× AFLCA champion player of the year award: 2024, 2026 (AFLCA Coaches Votes Record Holder: 147 Votes)
- 4× All-Australian team: 2023, 2024, 2025, 2026
- 2x Lou Richards Medal: 2025, 2026
- 2x Herald Sun Player of the Year: 2025, 2026
- 2x Copeland Trophy: 2024, 2026
- AFL Rising Star: 2022 - Record breaking unanimous 60 Votes
- AFLPA Best First Year Player: 2022
- AFLCA Best Young Player: 2023
- Anzac Day Medal: 2023
- 4× 22under22 team: 2022, 2023 (c), 2024 (c), 2025 (c)
- Victoria representative honours in AFL State of Origin: 2026
- Collingwood co-vice captain: 2025–
