= Bill Harvey (Australian footballer) =

Australian rules footballer (1926–1957)

Personal information
- Full name: William Charles Harvey
- Born: 10 October 1926; Mordialloc, Victoria
- Died: 6 April 1957 (aged 30); Heidelberg West, Victoria
- Height: 185 cm (6 ft 1 in)
- Weight: 78 kg (172 lb)

Playing career^{1}
Years	Club	Games (Goals)
1948	North Melbourne	2 (0)
1953	Fitzroy	0 (0)
- ^{1} Playing statistics correct to the end of 1948.

William Charles Harvey (10 October 1926 – 6 April 1957) was an Australian rules footballer who played with North Melbourne in the Victorian Football League (VFL).

== Family ==
He was the grandfather of North Melbourne games record holder Brent Harvey.

== Football ==
=== North Melbourne (VFL) ===
In his two seasons with North Melbourne (1948–1949), although a regular player in the Second XVIII, he only played in two senior matches, against Collingwood and Footscray in the 1948 season.

=== Heidelberg (DVFL) ===
He then played in the Diamond Valley Football League for the Heidelberg Football Club. He was the league's leading goal-kicker in 1950, with 102 goals.

=== Preston (VFA) ===
In 1951 he joined Preston in the VFA.

=== Fitzroy (VFL) ===
On 17 April 1953 he was cleared from Preston to Fitzroy. He played with the Second XVIII.

=== Preston (VFA) ===
Having failed to play First XVIII football with Fitzroy, he returned to Preston in 1954.
