= Lou Richards Medal =

Annual award in Australian football

The Lou Richards Medal is an annual Most Valuable Player award for the Australian Football League, based on votes from the Sunday Footy Show panel each week.

== History ==
The Lou Richards Medal is named after the late Collingwood hall of famer and esteemed media personality Lou Richards. It was named in his honour due to his involvement in football—both on-field and in the media.

== Voting ==
For each game during the home-and-away season, one Sunday Footy Show panelist will review the game and award votes to the best four players. These four players receive any number of votes up to ten based on the quality of their performance. Seven or eight are the most common scores given; ten votes, representing a supposedly flawless performance, is extremely rare.

== List of winners ==
Year	Winner	Club
2000	Wayne Carey	North Melbourne
2001	Michael Voss	Brisbane Lions
2002	Paul Williams	Sydney
2003		
2004		
2005	Ben Cousins	West Coast
2006	Scott West	Western Bulldogs
2007	Brent Harvey	North Melbourne
2008	Brent Harvey	North Melbourne
2009	Gary Ablett, Jr.	Geelong
2010	Dane Swan	Collingwood
2011	Sam Mitchell	Hawthorn
2012	Jobe Watson	Essendon
2013	Gary Ablett, Jr.	Gold Coast
2014	Scott Pendlebury	Collingwood
2015	Sam Mitchell	Hawthorn
2016	Patrick Dangerfield	Geelong
2017	Dustin Martin	Richmond
2018	Tom Mitchell	Hawthorn
2019	Patrick Dangerfield	Geelong
2020	Lachie Neale	Brisbane Lions
2021	Clayton Oliver	Melbourne
2022	Clayton Oliver	Melbourne
2023	Zak Butters	Port Adelaide
2024	Patrick Cripps	Carlton
2025	Nick Daicos	Collingwood
2026	Nick Daicos	Collingwood
