= Luke Darcy =

Australian rules footballer, born 1975

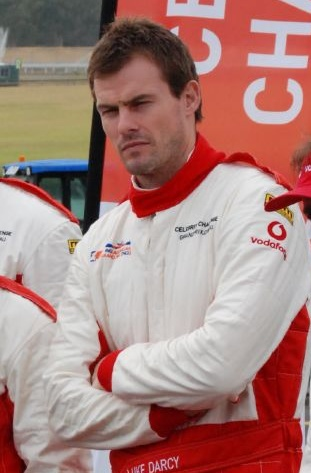
- Darcy at the celebrity race at Australian Formula 1 Grand Prix in Melbourne

Personal information
- Nicknames: Darce, Duke
- Born: 12 July 1975 (age 51)
- Original team: South Adelaide (SANFL)/Rostrevor College
- Debut: Round 21 1994, Footscray vs. St Kilda, at Waverley Park
- Height: 197 cm (6 ft 6 in)
- Weight: 100 kg (220 lb)
- Positions: Ruck, Forward

Playing career^{1}
Years	Club	Games (Goals)
1994–2007	Western Bulldogs	226 (183)

Representative team honours
Years	Team	Games (Goals)
1996–1999	South Australia	2 (0)
- ^{1} Playing statistics correct to the end of 2007.

Career highlights
- Western Bulldogs Captain: 2005–2006; Leigh Matthews Trophy: 2002 (shared); Herald Sun Player of the Year: 2002; Charles Sutton Medal: 2001; All-Australian: 2002; Western Bulldogs Leading Club Goalkicker Award: 2004; South Australia team Representative; AFL Rising Star nominee 1996

Luke Darcy (born 12 July 1975) is a former Australian rules footballer who played with the Western Bulldogs in the Australian Football League (AFL) and now works for the Seven Network and Triple M covering the AFL and the Olympics.

== Early life ==
Luke Darcy was born in Adelaide, South Australia, the son of David Darcy, who had played with Footscray (as the Western Bulldogs were then called) and played for and coached South Adelaide in the South Australian National Football League (SANFL). David, originally a Victorian, moved his family to Adelaide where Luke attended Rostrevor College.

== AFL career ==
Luke Darcy started his career with South Adelaide before his recruitment by the Bulldogs in 1993.

Debuting in 1994, Darcy became known as one of the Bulldogs' most successful ruckmen/forwards. In 2001 he took out the Bulldogs' Best and Fairest award, the Charles Sutton Medal, and continued to play well in the following seasons. in 2002 Darcy and the Brisbane Lions's Michael Voss were the first players to be awarded the Leigh Matthews Trophy as the AFL Players Association's Most Valuable Player (MVP)^{1}. In 2004 he was the Western Bulldogs's leading goalkicker.

In a 2005 match against Geelong, Darcy suffered a season-ending knee injury when he twisted it, depriving the Bulldogs of a quality tall-forward option, something they missed during the year. In 2026, his son, Sam, would suffer the exact same injury, coincidentally in round six against Geelong at GMHBA Stadium.

On 20 December 2005 during the final pre-season training session before the Christmas holidays, Darcy re-injured the ACL during a fall which dislocated his knee, which meant that he would miss the entire 2006 season. The Bulldogs finished the season in eighth place, the first time the club had made the finals in six years. He had been part of a Bulldogs casualty list that included four ACL injuries during the season (up until only the Round 9 mark).

During his time on the sidelines, he provided special comments for Network Ten's AFL coverage, and continued to do so after his playing retirement which he announced on 2 August 2007, the end of the 2007 AFL season. Darcy was officially added to Network Ten's AFL commentary team in 2007 (despite still playing football until the end of that season) and remained an Expert Commentator right up until the end of the 2011 AFL season, when the network lost broadcasting rights..

== Statistics ==
Legend
G	Goals	K	Kicks	D	Disposals	T	Tackles
B	Behinds	H	Handballs	M	Marks

Season	Team	No.	Games	Totals							Averages (per game)						
Season	Team	No.	Games	G	B	K	H	D	M	T	G	B	K	H	D	M	T
1994	Footscray	40	1	0	0	0	2	2	0	1	0.0	0.0	0.0	2.0	2.0	0.0	1.0
1995	Footscray	14	3	0	1	10	5	15	4	2	0.0	0.3	3.3	1.7	5.0	1.3	0.7
1996	Footscray	14	20	12	8	160	78	238	92	15	0.6	0.4	8.0	3.9	11.9	4.6	0.8
1997	Western Bulldogs	14	23	24	13	208	92	300	131	14	1.0	0.6	9.0	4.0	13.0	5.7	0.6
1998	Western Bulldogs	14	24	13	8	187	88	275	107	15	0.5	0.3	7.8	3.7	11.5	4.6	0.6
1999	Western Bulldogs	14	24	19	15	221	104	325	136	17	0.8	0.6	9.2	4.3	13.5	5.7	0.7
2000	Western Bulldogs	14	17	10	5	172	99	271	106	17	0.6	0.3	10.1	5.8	15.9	6.2	1.0
2001	Western Bulldogs	14	21	14	8	237	145	382	118	30	0.7	0.4	11.3	6.9	18.2	5.6	1.4
2002	Western Bulldogs	14	22	23	8	249	211	460	149	63	1.0	0.4	11.3	9.6	20.9	6.8	2.9
2003	Western Bulldogs	14	21	9	7	211	165	376	129	46	0.4	0.3	10.0	7.9	17.9	6.1	2.2
2004	Western Bulldogs	14	22	30	13	216	136	352	127	59	1.4	0.6	9.8	6.2	16.0	5.8	2.7
2005	Western Bulldogs	14	6	11	3	51	30	81	43	7	1.8	0.5	8.5	5.0	13.5	7.2	1.2
2006	Western Bulldogs	14	0	—	—	—	—	—	—	—	—	—	—	—	—	—	—
2007	Western Bulldogs	14	22	18	8	141	87	228	91	43	0.8	0.4	6.4	4.0	10.4	4.1	2.0
Career			226	183	97	2063	1242	3305	1233	329	0.8	0.4	9.1	5.5	14.6	5.5	1.5

== Honours and achievements ==
**Brownlow Medal votes**
Season	Votes
1994	—
1995	—
1996	2
1997	7
1998	—
1999	5
2000	3
2001	11
2002	16
2003	6
2004	—
2005	5
2006	—
2007	—
**Total**	**55**
Key:
Green / **Bold** = Won

- **Individual**
  - Charles Sutton Medal: 2001
  - Leigh Matthews Trophy (AFLPA MVP Award): 2002 (tied with Michael Voss)
  - All-Australian: 2002
  - Australian Football Media Association Player of the Year Award: 2002
  - Herald Sun Player of the Year Award: 2002
  - Western Bulldogs Leading Club Goalkicker Award: 2004
  - Australian Representative Honours in International Rules Football: 2002
  - Western Bulldogs Captain: 2005–2006
  - AFL Rising Star Nominee: 1996 (Round 3)

== Post-football career and personal life ==
Darcy is married to wife Rebecca and has four children. He is also the son of former Footscray ruckman David Darcy.

In 2008, Darcy became a member of the AFL rules committee while 2011 joined the AFL's All Australian selection panel filling this role for nine years until 2020. Darcy resigned as an All Australian selector to join former club, Western Bulldogs as a director.

In 2021, Darcy's son Sam Darcy was drafted by the Western Bulldogs at pick number 2 in the 2021 AFL draft under the father–son rule.

Darcy met the former Leader of the Opposition Peter Dutton through mutual friends, and became close friends. He is reported to have introduced him to meditation.

In June 2023, Darcy was inducted into the Western Bulldogs Hall of Fame.

=== Media ===
Late in his AFL career, Darcy was an expert commentator for Network Ten, doing this while injured then filling in around his playing commitments. Darcy was part of the team full time once his retirement came at the end of 2007. His roles expanded on Ten becoming a netball commentator as well as becoming a panellist on AFL panel shows One Week at a Time, Thursday Night Live. and The Fifth Quarter.

Darcy also joined radio station Triple M in Melbourne to provide match commentary for its Australian rules football coverage on Friday nights. He co-hosted Triple M Melbourne's The Hot Breakfast with fellow AFL personality Eddie McGuire until November 2020.

Following the 2011 season, Network Ten lost the rights to broadcast Australian rules football matches; he subsequently joined the Seven Network as part of its expanded AFL coverage. He mainly commentates on the station's Saturday night coverage while maintaining his work at Triple M on Friday nights.

In 2014, Darcy became the new host of Seven's AFL chat show Talking Footy. Darcy has also been a fill in sport presenter on Seven News Melbourne and has served as a tennis commentator for Seven, covering the 2014 Brisbane International.

In February 2019, Darcy was announced as co-host of the Seven Network's lifestyle program, House of Wellness alongside Jo Stanley, Rachael Finch, Luke Hines and Jacqui Felgate.

Darcy hosted Seven's coverage of the 2020 Tokyo Olympics alongside Johanna Griggs.

== Note ==
^{1}The AFL MVP award dates back to 1982, when the league was still the Victorian Football League (VFL), but the Leigh Matthews Trophy was only created in 2002. All prior VFL/AFL MVPs were retrospectively given the Leigh Matthews Trophy in 2005.
