= Patrick Dangerfield =

Australian rules footballer (born 1990)

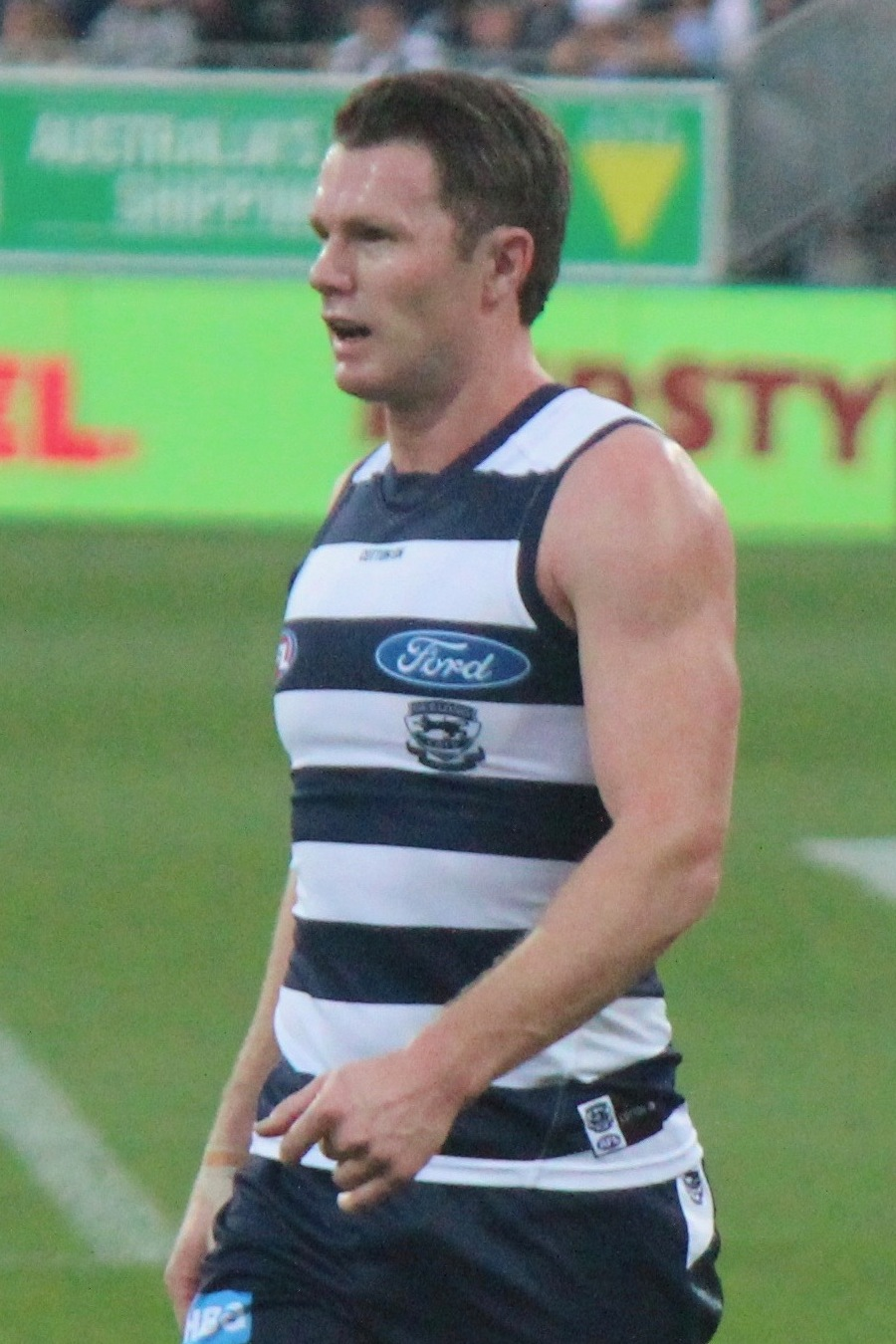
- Dangerfield playing for Geelong in 2019

Personal information
- Full name: Patrick Dangerfield
- Nickname: Danger
- Born: 5 April 1990 (age 36); Moggs Creek, Victoria
- Original team: Geelong Falcons (TAC Cup)
- Draft: No. 10, 2007 national draft
- Debut: Round 20, 2008, Adelaide vs. Essendon, at Telstra Dome
- Height: 189 cm (6 ft 2 in)
- Weight: 97 kg (214 lb)
- Position: Midfielder / forward

Club information
- Current club: Geelong
- Number: 35

Playing career^{1}
Years	Club	Games (Goals)
2008–2015	Adelaide	154 (163)
2016–	Geelong	225 (232)
Total		379 (395)

Representative team honours^{2}
Years	Team	Games (Goals)
2020–2026	Victoria	2 (3)

International team honours^{2}
2010–2017	Australia	6 (0)
- ^{1} Playing statistics correct to the end of 2026.^{2} Representative statistics correct as of 2026.

Career highlights
- AFL premiership player: 2022; Geelong captain: 2023–; Brownlow Medal: 2016; Leigh Matthews Trophy: 2016; AFLCA champion player of the year: 2016; 8× All-Australian team: 2012, 2013, 2015, 2016, 2017, 2018, 2019, 2020 (c); Gary Ayres Award: 2022; Malcolm Blight Medal: 2015; 3× Carji Greeves Medal: 2016, 2017, 2019; Showdown Medal: 2012 (game 1); Tom Wills Award: 2022; AFL Rising Star nominee: 2009

Patrick Dangerfield (born 5 April 1990) is an Australian rules football player for the Geelong Football Club of the Australian Football League (AFL). He previously played for the Adelaide Football Club from 2008 to 2015. He has served as Geelong captain since the 2023 season.

Drafted by Adelaide in 2007, Dangerfield was immediately able to make a lasting impression with his ability to explode from stoppages through the midfield as well as play virtually all of the forward positions. Since debuting in 2008, Dangerfield's accomplishments include winning the Brownlow Medal, the Leigh Matthews Trophy, and the AFLCA Champion Player of the Year Award. He is also an eight-time All-Australian and won a premiership with Geelong in 2022. He has represented Australia four times in the International Rules Series and was president of the AFL Players Association from 2018 to 2025.

== Early life ==
Dangerfield was born on 5 April 1990 at Moggs Creek, Victoria, to mother Jeanette and father John.

He first played junior football with Anglesea Football Netball Club. In 2004, at 14 years of age, he was named junior captain. He was selected to represent Vic Country at the Under-16 National Championships.

In his late teens, he moved to Geelong and attended Oberon High School, where he was named school captain. In October 2007, he won the 100 m and 400 m titles at the Victorian Secondary Schools Athletics. He played at Under-18 level with the Geelong Falcons, earning selection for Vic Country in the Under-18 National Championships. He was selected in the AIS-AFL Academy squad that toured South Africa in early 2007.

== AFL career ==
=== Adelaide (2008–2015) ===
==== 2008–2011: Early career ====
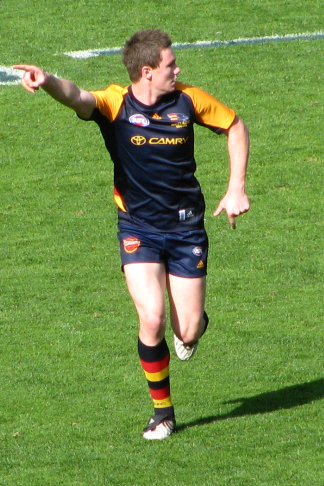
Dangerfield pre-match with Adelaide in 2009

Patrick Dangerfield was selected by Adelaide with the tenth pick in the 2007 National Draft. Dangerfield's selection caused immediate controversy, as he spent his first AFL year studying in his home state, Victoria, and could not train with the club consistently, while other possible selections such as Brad Ebert began their AFL careers in the senior side. During 2008, he played for the Geelong Falcons in the TAC Cup while studying and training with Adelaide when possible. Despite his disadvantages, Dangerfield made his debut for the Crows in their round 20 clash against Essendon during the 2008 AFL season, recording 9 disposals and 1 goal. Dangerfield played one more game for the season, the following week in round 21, recording 3 disposals.

In the 2009 AFL season, Dangerfield changed his guernsey number from 19 (retired in order to assist the launch of the club's "19th Man" campaign) to the number belonging to former Adelaide captain Mark Ricciuto, 32. In that year, he became a regular in the Crows' senior side, with his style of play likened by fans and commentators to Ricciuto. He received an AFL Rising Star nomination in Round 3 for his performance against Fremantle at Subiaco Oval; Dangerfield recorded 20 disposals, 1 goal, 5 inside-fifties, and 5 clearances in the game. Dangerfield played in 19 of the 22 games during the home-and-away season, averaging 13.0 disposals and 1.0 goals a game. Dangerfield played in two finals, recording 11 disposals and 2 goals in the Crows 96-point win over Essendon in an elimination final, the following week Dangerfield recorded 16 disposals and 2 goals in a 5-point loss to Collingwood in the semi-finals. In the 2010 AFL season, Dangerfield continued to develop his game, only missing two games for the entire season. He increased his disposal average to 15.7 and continued to average a goal a game, kicking 26 goals for the season. Dangerfield had his best game of the season in a 22-point victory over the West Coast Eagles in round 15, recording 23 disposals, 1 goal, 7 inside-fifties, and 6 clearances.

In the 2011 AFL season, Dangerfield was given more responsibility in the midfield and continued to make leaps on improving his game, increasing his disposal average from 15.7 to 17.1, along with still averaging a goal a game, racking up 375 disposals for the year (6th best at the club), and kicking 23 goals (3rd best at the club) behind the Crows' two main forwards. Dangerfield had his first 30 possession game against Richmond in round 23, recording 31 disposals, 7 inside-fifties, and 10 clearances in a 22-point loss. He also won the first of three successive titles in the annual Grand Final Sprint.

==== 2012–2015: Emerging star and departure from Adelaide ====
In the 2012 AFL season, Dangerfield emerged as a star of the competition, playing in the midfield full-time, and racking up 667 disposals for the regular season, ranked tenth in the AFL. He increased his average disposal count from 17.1 up to 26.7 a game, but dropped to averaging just under a goal a game, still kicking 23 goals for the season. Dangerfield had several breakout games in 2012, recording 39 disposals and 14 inside-fifties in a round 5 showdown clash against Port Adelaide, resulting in Dangerfield winning the Showdown Medal, recording 36 disposals and 2 goals in a round 23 clash against the Gold Coast Suns, among more. Dangerfield ended his season by receiving his first ever selection into the All-Australian Team as a forward-flanker and polled 23 votes (third highest in his career) finishing 7th in the 2012 Brownlow Medal. Dangerfield helped the Crows finish the season with a win–loss record of 17–5, finishing 2nd on the ladder after finishing 14th the previous year. During the season he re-signed with the club for three years, to a very positive reaction from Crows supporters.

In the 2013 AFL season, Dangerfield had another strong season, but wasn't able to replicate the success he had in the previous season, his average disposal count dropped from 26.7 down to 23.3, and he only racked up 466 disposals (66th in the league) compared to the 667 he had the previous year. He switched between playing in the forward line and midfield, resulting in him kicking 31 goals for the season, the second-highest tally at the club. He was selected for his second All-Australian Team as a forward flanker and polled 22 votes at the 2013 Brownlow Medal, finishing fourth. He played his 100th AFL game against Sydney in round 11, recording 27 disposals, 1 goal, and 8 inside-fifties, but the milestone would not be one to be remembered as the Crows lost by 77 points. In the 2014 AFL season, Dangerfield was named acting co-captain alongside Rory Sloane due to regular captain Nathan van Berlo's absence through injury. He continued his elite form, and increased his disposal average to 24.9 a game, along with kicking 17 goals for the season. Dangerfield led the Crows in disposals at the end of the season (548) and was second in the league for contested possessions (341) behind Josh Kennedy (371). Dangerfield's season included a 41-possession game against reigning premiers, Hawthorn, a record for an AFL match at the Adelaide Oval. Dangerfield wasn't selected for the All-Australian Team, not even making the initial 40-man squad. He polled 21 votes and finished equal fourth at the 2014 Brownlow Medal.

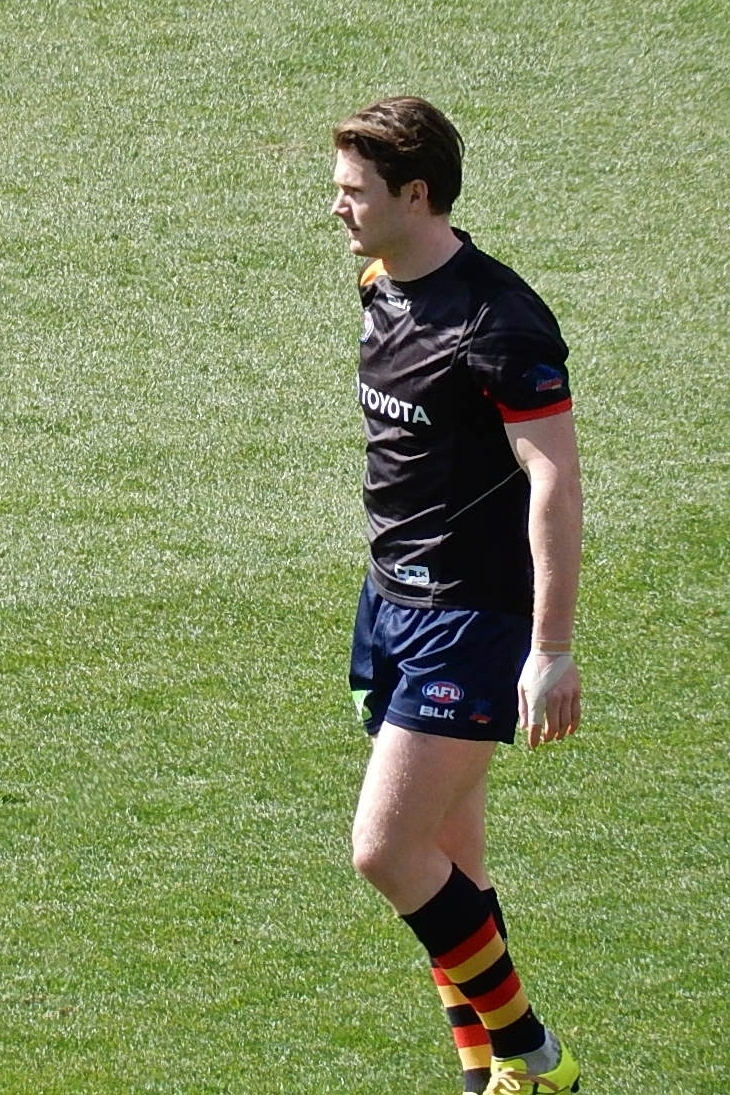
Dangerfield pre-match with Adelaide in 2015

In the 2015 AFL season, Dangerfield had his best season as a Crow to date, averaging 26.8 disposals and one goal a game, kicking 21 goals for the season. He led his team in disposals with 617 and was ranked 10th in the league, along with being ranked 5th in the league for clearances (165), and 3rd for inside-fifties (114). He had four games where he recorded more than 35 possessions. In round 21, Dangerfield made his 150th senior appearance for the Adelaide Crows in their clash against Brisbane, he recorded 16 disposals and 1 goal in the 87-point victory. Dangerfield was recognised for his strong season when he was awarded the Malcolm Blight Medal as the club best and fairest, along with being selected into the All-Australian Team as midfielder. Dangerfield appeared in two finals, recording 26 disposals in an elimination final victory over the Western Bulldogs and 29 disposals, 1 goal, and 10 clearances in a loss to Hawthorn in the semi-finals. At the conclusion of the 2015 season, he announced his intention to pursue his rights as a free agent to return to live in his hometown of Moggs Creek just outside Geelong. He was officially traded to the Geelong Football Club in October.

=== Geelong (2016–present) ===
==== 2016–2018: Brownlow Medal and individual success ====
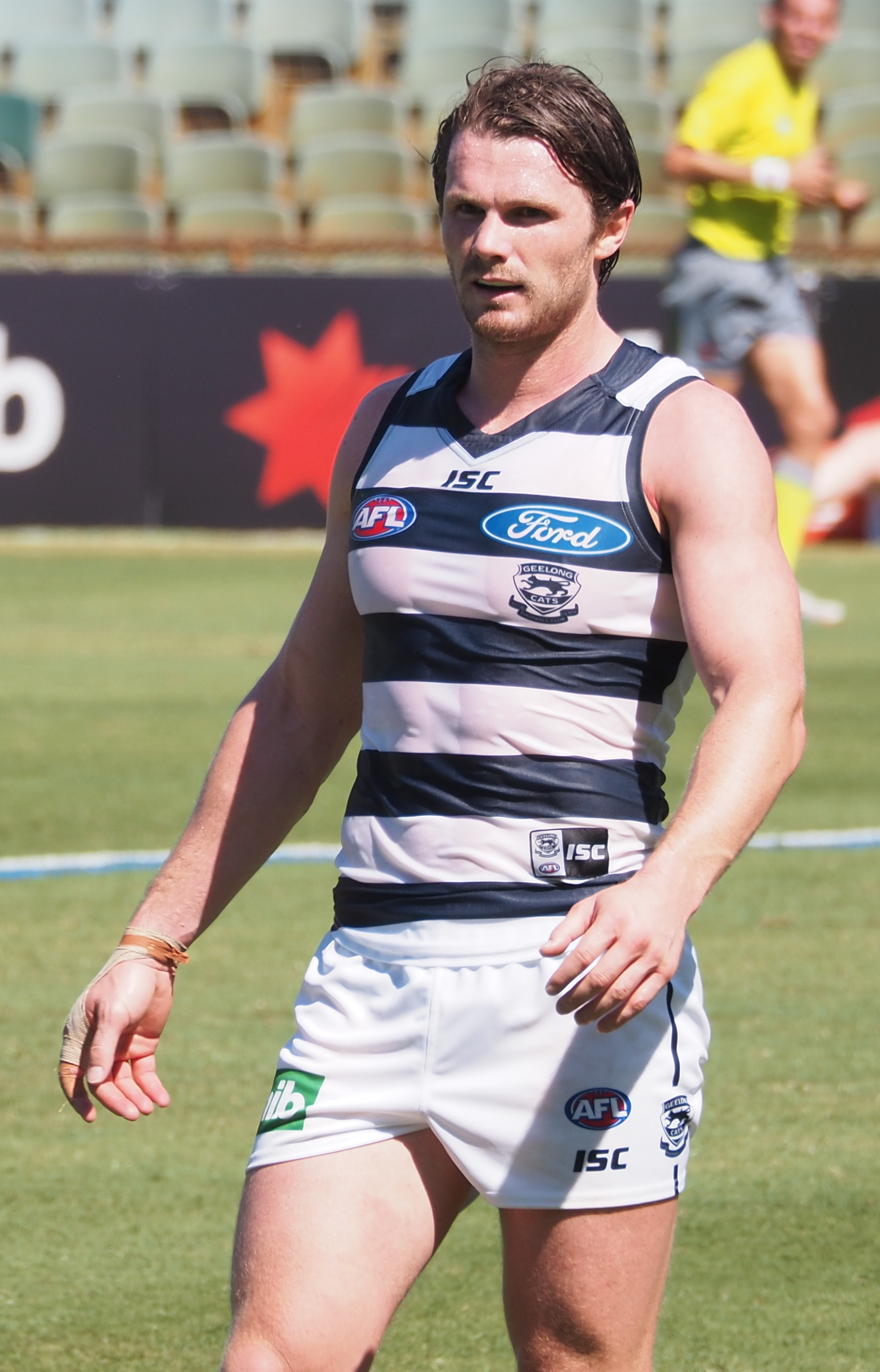
Dangerfield during a pre-season match for Geelong in 2016

Dangerfield had a tremendous start to the 2016 AFL season, making his debut for Geelong in the opening round in Geelong's annual Easter Monday clash with Hawthorn. He amassed 43 disposals to break Greg Williams' record for most disposals in a debut for a new team, and Geelong defeated Hawthorn by 30 points. Dangerfield would continue that tremendous form throughout the 2016 season, recording 30 or more possessions in 15 out of 22 games. In round 12 he would record a career-high 48 possessions in a 31-point victory over North Melbourne; in the same game, Dangerfield recorded 2 goals, 11 inside-fifties, and 13 clearances. He finished the season by increasing his disposal average from 26.8 to 31.7, along with averaging a goal a game, ending the season with 24 goals. He had a career-high disposals (762), 3rd in the league, and was 2nd in the league for contested possessions (388). Dangerfield took home a cavalcade of individual accolades at the end of the 2016 season—he was awarded the Leigh Matthews Trophy at the 2016 AFL Players Association awards, as the league's most valuable player (MVP), along with being selected into the 2016 All-Australian Team as a midfielder and winning the Herald Sun and The Age Footballer of the Year Awards, the Lou Richards Medal, the AFL Coaches' Association 'Champion Player of the Year' Award, the Carji Greeves Medal as the club's best and fairest, and finally Dangerfield polled 35 votes, 9 votes ahead of the runner-up Luke Parker (26) to win the 2016 Brownlow Medal as the league's fairest and best player. Dangerfield also helped Geelong to a 17–5 win–loss record, resulting in them finishing 2nd on the ladder. Dangerfield's tremendous form carried into the finals series as he recorded 35 disposals and 7 clearances in Geelong's two point victory over Hawthorn in the qualifying final. In the preliminary final he would record 39 disposals, 1 goal, 9 inside-fifties, and 9 clearances in a 37-point loss to Sydney.

Dangerfield had a brilliant start to 2017 AFL season, recording 37 disposals, 1 goal, and 11 clearances in Geelong's round 2 clash against North Melbourne. The following week he recorded 36 disposals, 3 goals, and 9 clearances in Geelong's round 3 clash against Melbourne. Dangerfield again continued that tremendous form throughout the season, recording 30 or more disposals in 14 out of 22 games, averaging almost 30 possessions a game (29.9). Dangerfield also improved his goal kicking, kicking 3 or more goals in 8 out of 22 games, ending the season with a career-high 45 goals, the most by any midfielder in the league, he almost averaged 2 goals a game (1.9). Dangerfield had career-highs in tackles (141) 10th in the league, clearances (172) 1st in the league, and handballs (394) 4th in the league. He was also 2nd in the league for inside-fifties (127) and 5th in the league for disposals (718). In round 19, Dangerfield was reported for striking Carlton ruckman, Matthew Kreuzer, resulting in Dangerfield being suspended and becoming ineligible to win the 2017 Brownlow Medal. At the end of the season, he was selected into his 5th All-Australian Team as a midfielder, won his second successive Carji Greeves Medal, and polled 33 votes at the Brownlow Medal to finish as the runner-up to winner Dustin Martin who polled 36 votes. Dangerfield led Geelong into the finals after finishing 2nd on the ladder for successive years with a 15–1–6 record. Dangerfield played in his 200th senior appearance in the qualifying final against Richmond, recording 31 disposals and 1 goal in a 51-point loss. Danger went on to have another strong finals series with 26 disposals and 4 goals in the semi-final, and 24 disposals, along with 2 goals in the Geelong's preliminary final loss.

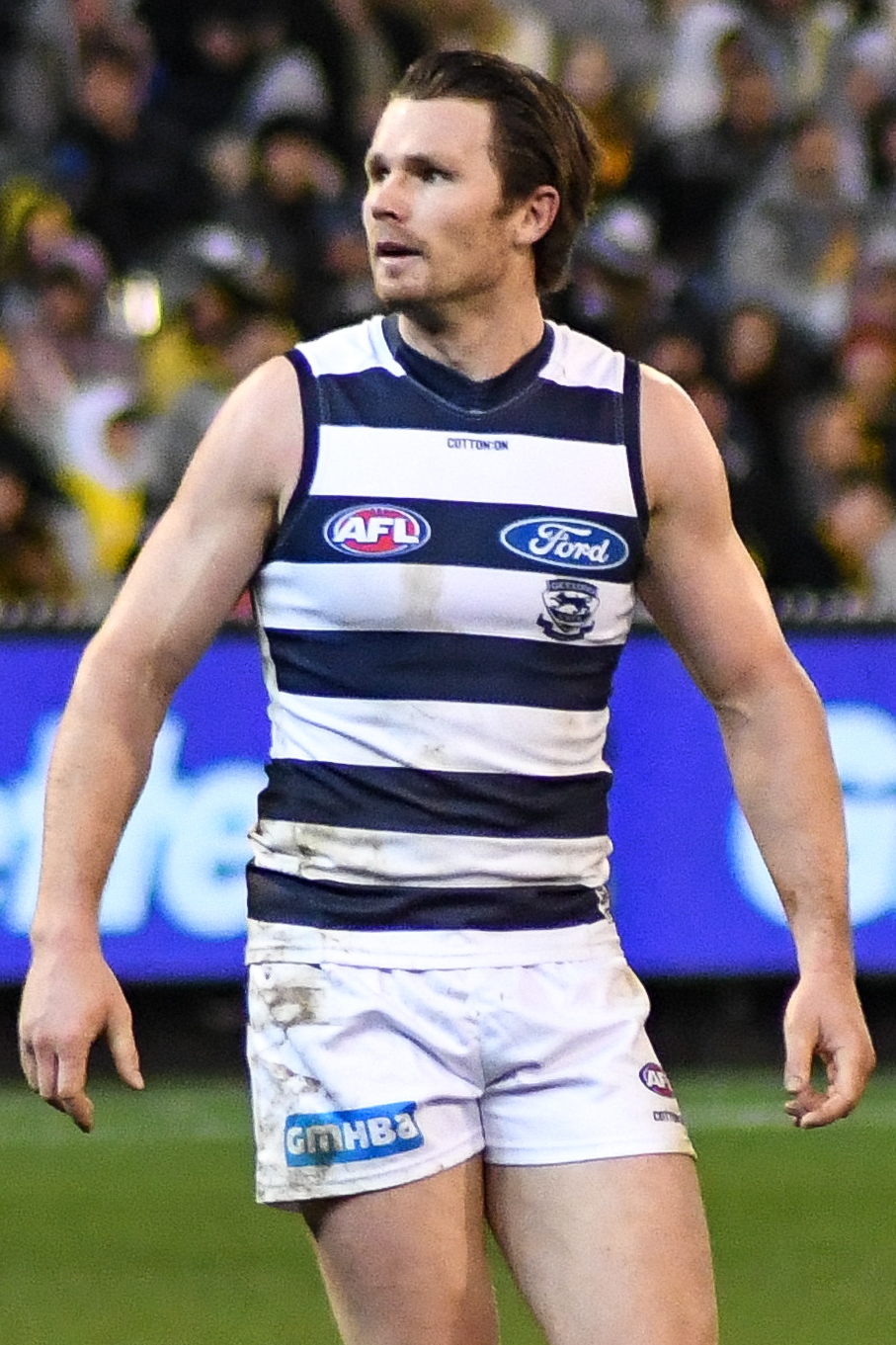
Dangerfield playing for Geelong in 2018

Dangerfield continued his strong form into the 2018 AFL season and was still considered an elite star, but his statistics weren't as impressive as his previous years were, averaging 28.1 disposals (down from 29.9) and 1.1 goals a game (down from 1.9), kicking 24 goals for the season (down from 47 goals). He would have over 30 possessions on more than 7 occasions throughout the season (down from 14 in the previous season), with two 39 possession games. At the end of the season, Dangerfield was named into his 6th All-Australian Team, but for the first time was named as the Vice-Captain of the team. He polled his third lowest Brownlow votes (17) at the Brownlow Medal, finishing 10th. Dangerfield led Geelong to a 13–9 win–loss record, resulting in Geelong finishing 8th and barely making the finals; Dangerfield recorded 25 disposals in Geelong's 29-point loss in the elimination final.

==== 2019–2022: All-Australian captain and premiership ====
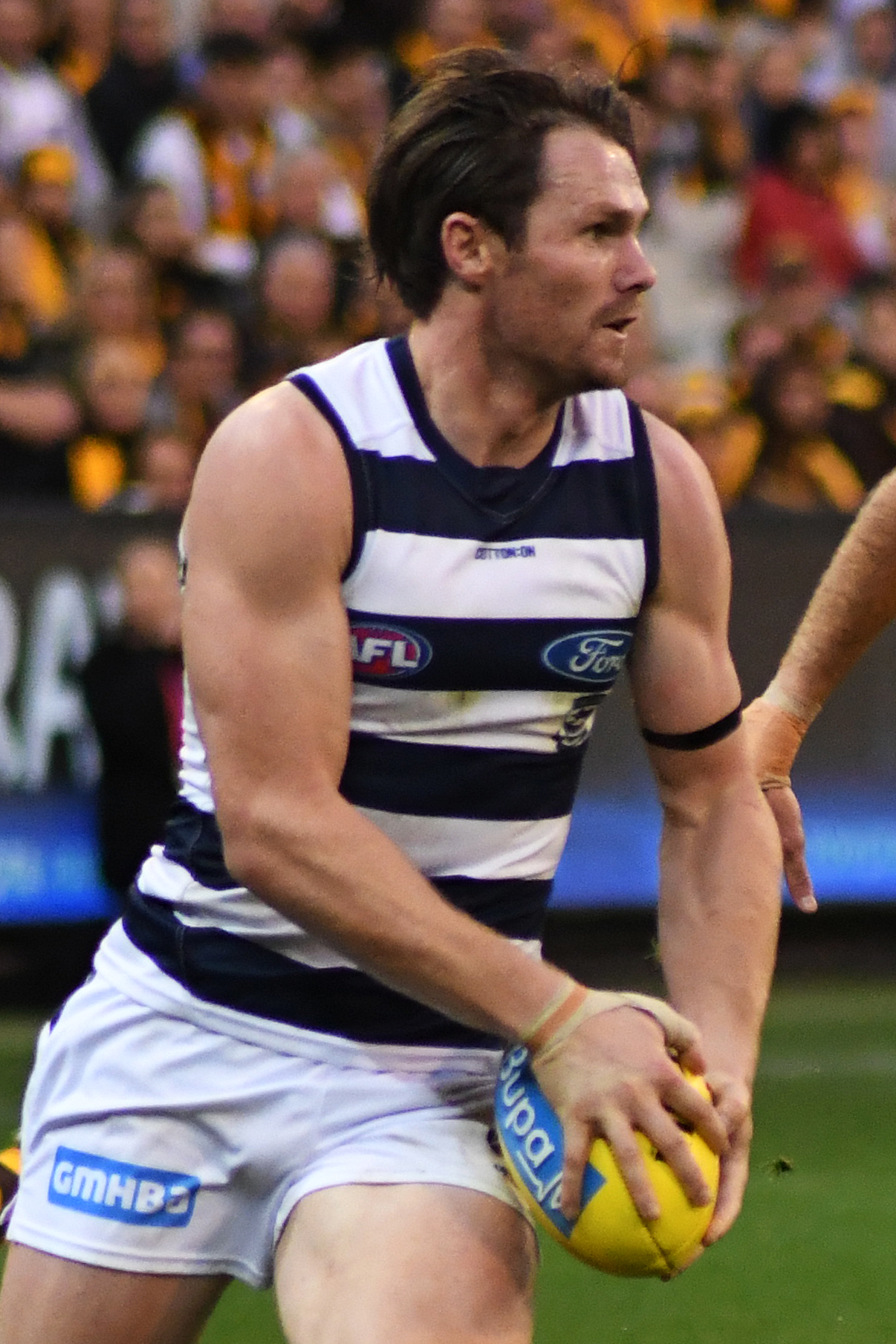
Dangerfield playing for Geelong in 2019

Dangerfield started off his 2019 AFL season in strong form, recording 37 disposals and 2 goals in Geelong's win over Melbourne in round 2. Dangerfield would average 27.1 disposals, racking up 650 disposals (13th in the league), 1.1 goals (26 goals for the season), 14.5 contested possessions, racking up 349 contested possessions (4th in the league), and 6.0 inside-fifties, racking up 141 (2nd in the league). Dangerfield's best game of the season was a win against Carlton in round 23, where he recorded 34 disposals, 4 goals, 9 inside-fifties, and 12 clearances. Throughout the season, Dangerfield was being considered by many as the favourite to win the Brownlow Medal. At the end of the season, Dangerfield would be selected for his 7th All-Australian Team. Dangerfield would finish as the runner-up for the Brownlow Medal, polling 27 votes, 6 votes behind the winner Nat Fyfe (33). Dangerfield led the Cats to a tremendous season, finishing with a win–loss record of 16–6, resulting in Geelong finishing 1st on the ladder and claiming the McClelland Trophy for the 10th time in club history and the first time since 2008. Dangerfield had another excellent finals series, recording 32 disposals and 1 goal in the qualifying final, and recording 27 disposals, 1 goal, and 7 clearances in Geelong's preliminary final loss to Richmond.

Dangerfield experienced Grand Final heartbreak as the Cats suffered defeat in the 2020 AFL Grand Final to Richmond, before falling short in a preliminary final again during the 2021 AFL finals series—this time at the hands of Melbourne.

During the 2022 season, Dangerfield captured his first AFL Premiership whilst playing in his second Grand Final. He finished runner-up in the voting for the Norm Smith Medal, with 27 disposals and 9 clearances.

==== 2023–present: Geelong captaincy ====
Following the retirement of long-term skipper Joel Selwood, Dangerfield was appointed as captain of the Cats for the 2023 season.

Dangerfield's 2024 season was marred by a hamstring injury, which saw him miss 9 games and poll just 3 Brownlow votes, his lowest season total since 2010. Dangerfield had been facing soft-tissue issues since 2020.

In 2025, Dangerfield started the season strongly with a powerful positional change into the forward line. He kicked four goals against Adelaide in round five, and had 29 disposals in a thrilling round eight win against Collingwood. He later played his 350th game in the round 17 loss to Brisbane Lions. Dangerfield played his best game in a number of years in the preliminary final against Hawthorn. A captain's performance, his 31 disposals and three goals highlighted his game "for the ages".

== Statistics ==
Updated to the end of round 22, 2026.

Legend
G	Goals	K	Kicks	D	Disposals	T	Tackles
B	Behinds	H	Handballs	M	Marks
#	Played in that season's premiership team	±	Won that season's Brownlow Medal

Season	Team	No.	Games	Totals							Averages (per game)							Votes
Season	Team	No.	Games	G	B	K	H	D	M	T	G	B	K	H	D	M	T	Votes
2008	Adelaide	19	2	1	1	6	6	12	4	2	0.5	0.5	3.0	3.0	6.0	2.0	1.0	0
2009	Adelaide	32	21	21	19	106	167	273	58	47	1.0	0.9	5.0	8.0	13.0	2.8	2.2	0
2010	Adelaide	32	19	26	19	140	158	298	52	57	1.4	1.0	7.4	8.3	15.7	2.7	3.0	2
2011	Adelaide	32	22	23	13	204	171	375	64	72	1.0	0.6	9.3	7.8	17.0	2.9	3.3	7
2012	Adelaide	32	25	23	9	390	277	667	106	77	0.9	0.4	15.6	11.1	26.7	4.2	3.1	23
2013	Adelaide	32	20	31	18	302	164	466	84	64	1.6	0.9	15.1	8.2	23.3	4.2	3.2	22
2014	Adelaide	32	22	17	22	276	272	548	74	78	0.8	1.0	12.5	12.4	24.9	3.4	3.5	21
2015	Adelaide	32	23	21	14	322	295	617	84	126	0.9	0.6	14.0	12.8	26.8	3.7	5.5	22
2016	Geelong	35	24	24	24	387	375	762	122	109	1.0	1.0	16.1	15.6	31.8	5.1	4.5	35^{±}
2017	Geelong	35	24	45	32	324	394	718	109	141	1.9	1.3	13.5	16.4	29.9	4.5	5.9	33
2018	Geelong	35	22	24	23	305	314	619	82	102	1.1	1.0	13.9	14.3	28.1	3.7	4.6	17
2019	Geelong	35	24	27	18	352	298	650	119	104	1.1	0.8	14.7	12.4	27.1	5.0	4.3	27
2020 (Note: The 2020 season was played with 17 home-and-away matches per team (down from 22) and 16-minute quarters with time on (down from 20-minute quarters with time on) due to the impact of the COVID-19 pandemic.)	Geelong	35	21	17	17	280	157	437	78	54	0.8	0.8	13.3	7.5	20.8	3.7	2.6	15
2021	Geelong	35	16	8	7	212	159	371	71	53	0.5	0.4	13.3	9.9	23.2	4.4	3.3	6
2022^{#}	Geelong	35	18	8	12	226	178	404	70	49	0.4	0.7	12.6	9.9	22.4	3.9	2.7	6
2023	Geelong	35	18	11	8	213	156	369	59	67	0.6	0.4	11.8	8.7	20.5	3.3	3.7	12
2024	Geelong	35	16	8	6	195	127	322	54	63	0.5	0.4	12.2	7.9	20.1	3.4	3.9	3
2025	Geelong	35	23	30	22	180	170	350	77	57	1.3	1.0	7.8	7.4	15.2	3.3	2.5	8
2026	Geelong	35	19	30	16	157	127	284	66	34	1.6	0.8	8.3	6.7	15.0	3.5	1.8	3
Career			379	395	300	4577	3965	8542	1433	1356	1.0	0.8	12.1	10.5	22.5	3.8	3.6	262

== Honours and achievements ==
Team

- AFL premiership player (Geelong): 2022
- 2× McClelland Trophy/AFL minor premiership (Geelong): 2019, 2022
- NAB Cup (Adelaide): 2012

Individual

- Geelong captain: 2023–present
- Brownlow Medal: 2016
- Leigh Matthews Trophy: 2016
- AFLCA champion player of the year: 2016
- 8× All-Australian team: 2012, 2013, 2015, 2016, 2017, 2018, 2019, 2020 (c)
- Gary Ayres Award: 2022
- Malcolm Blight Medal: 2015
- 3× Carji Greeves Medal: 2016, 2017, 2019
- Showdown Medal: 2012 (game 1)
- Tom Wills Trophy: 2022
- AFL Rising Star nominee: 2009
