= 2016 Brownlow Medal =

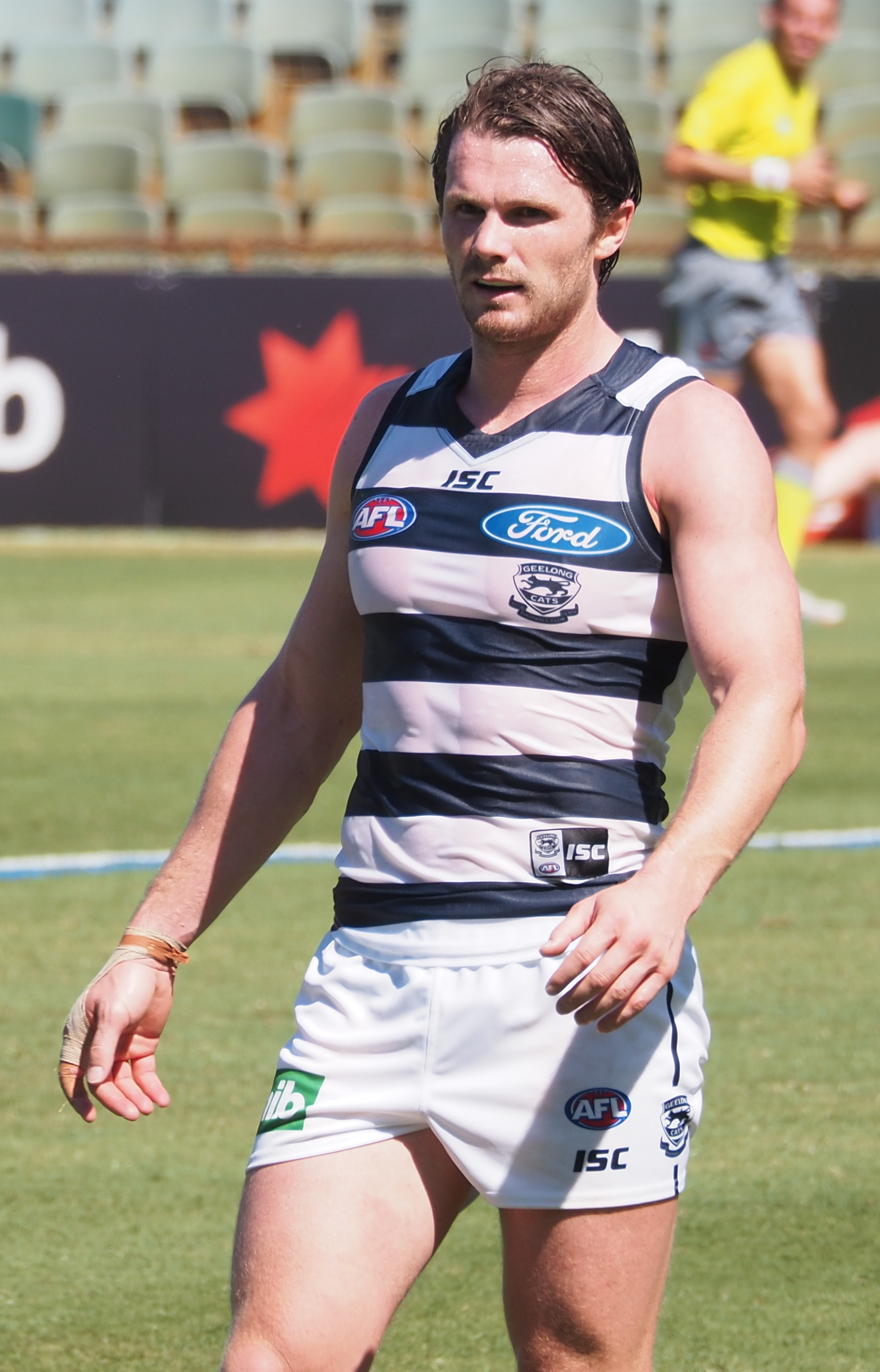
- 2016 Brownlow Medallist, Patrick Dangerfield
- Date: 26 September
- Location: Crown Palladium
- Hosted by: Bruce McAvaney
- Winner: Patrick Dangerfield (Geelong); 35 votes

Television/radio coverage
- Network: Seven Network; Fox Footy; Telstra

The 2016 Brownlow Medal was the 89th year the award was presented to the player adjudged the fairest and best player during the Australian Football League (AFL) home and away season. Patrick Dangerfield of the Geelong Football Club won the medal by polling thirty-five votes during the 2016 AFL season, at the time the most by any player under the 3-2-1 voting system, beating the previous record of 34 votes set by Dane Swan in 2011.

== Leading vote-getters ==
	Player	Votes
1st	Patrick Dangerfield (Geelong)	35
2nd	Luke Parker (Sydney)	26
3rd	Dustin Martin (Richmond)	25
	Rory Sloane (Adelaide)*	24
=4th	Andrew Gaff (West Coast)	21
=4th	Dan Hannebery (Sydney)	21
=4th	Adam Treloar (Collingwood)	21
=7th	Marcus Bontempelli (Western Bulldogs)	20
=7th	Lachie Neale (Fremantle)	20
=9th	Robbie Gray (Port Adelaide)	19
=9th	Zach Merrett (Essendon)	19
=9th	Nick Riewoldt (St Kilda)	19

* The player was ineligible to win the medal due to suspension by the AFL Tribunal during the year.

== Voting procedure ==
The three field umpires (those umpires who control the flow of the game, as opposed to goal or boundary umpires) confer after each match and award three votes, two votes, and one vote to the players they regard as the best, second-best and third-best in the match, respectively. The votes are kept secret until the awards night, and they are read and tallied on the evening.

A change was made in 2015 to the rules under which players could become ineligible for the Brownlow Medal. Under previous rules, players were ineligible if found guilty at the AFL Tribunal of an offence with a base penalty equal to or greater than a one-match suspension, even if the player then avoided suspension by taking an early guilty plea after the Match Review Panel's findings. Under the rules:

- The penalty for all low-end offences for which a player could previously have received a reprimand but avoided suspension was changed to a $1000 fine for the first offence within a season, a $1500 fine for the second offence within a season, and a one-match suspension for the third offence within a season
- Players would become ineligible for the Brownlow medal only if they incurred a suspension
