= Brownlow Medal =

Award in Australian Football League

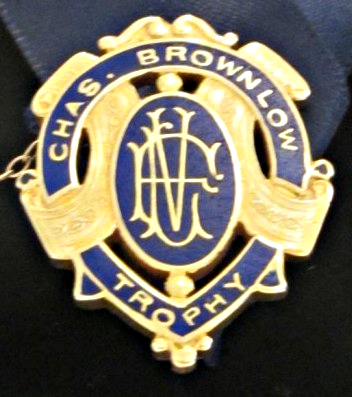
- The first Brownlow Medal, awarded to Edward Greeves Jr. in 1924
- Awarded for: The best and fairest player in the Australian Football League
- Location: Crown Palladium Ballroom
- Country: Australia
- Presented by: Australian Football League
- First award: 1924
- Currently held by: Nick Daicos
- Website: Brownlow Medal

Television/radio coverage
- Network: Seven Network (1970–2001, 2007, 2009, 2011–present); Fox Footy (2012–2016); Network Ten (2002, 2004, 2006, 2008, 2010); Nine Network (2003, 2005)

The Charles Brownlow Trophy, better known as the Brownlow Medal (and informally as Charlie), is awarded to the best and fairest player in the Australian Football League (AFL) during the home-and-away season, as determined by votes cast by the four officiating field umpires after each game. It is the most prestigious award for individual players in the AFL.

The medal was first awarded by the Victorian Football League (VFL). It was created and named in honour of Charles Brownlow, a former Geelong Football Club footballer (1880–1891) and club secretary (1885–1923), and VFL president (1918–1919), who had died in January 1924 after an extended illness.

== Creation ==
The Brownlow Medal was created prior to the 1924 VFL season, following the death of Charles Brownlow who was a long-serving secretary and former captain of the Geelong Football Club as well as a senior administrator with the VFL and Australasian Football Council. On 29 February 1924, the VFL committee unanimously passed the below motion moved by Collingwood Football Club secretary Ern Copeland:

To perpetuate the memory of the late Charles Brownlow [for] his many years of most valuable service to the Australian game both as a player, Club Secretary, Delegate and Vice President of the League, and President of the Australasian Football Council, a gold and enamel medal of the value of £10 shall be presented annually by the League to the best and fairest player in premiership matches each season, the medal to be called the Brownlow Medal.

The medal is inscribed "Chas. Brownlow Trophy", although this name is not mentioned in the 1924 resolution. Excluding the change of the monogram from VFL to AFL in 1990, the design, shape and size of the medal have been virtually unchanged since 1924.

The VFL was the last of the three elite leagues to strike an award for league best and fairest, with the SANFL's Magarey Medal being first awarded in 1898, and the WAFL's Sandover Medal first being awarded since 1921. Over time, all three awards have migrated towards similar rules regarding voting and eligibility.

== Criteria for "fairest" and "best" ==
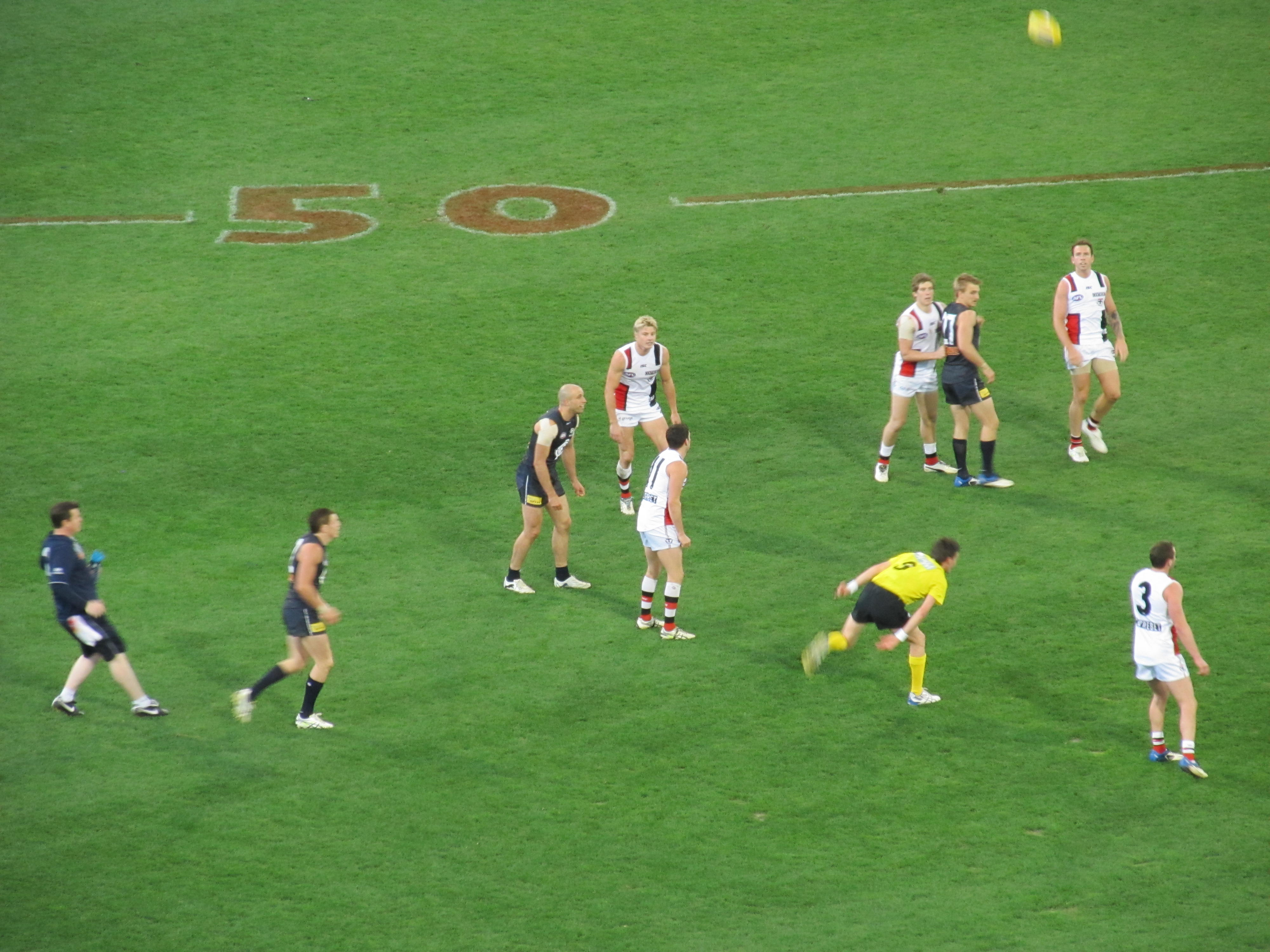
Brownlow Medal votes are allocated by the game-controlling field umpires (pictured in yellow attire).

Although the award is generally spoken of the best and fairest, the award's specific criterion is fairest and best, reflecting an emphasis on sportsmanship and fair play (this also explains the decision to have the votes cast by the umpires), as the 1924 illuminated facsimile expressly states:

You were selected as the fairest and best player and we have pleasure in presenting the accompanying Gold Medal in recognition of those sterling qualities.

=== Voting procedure for "best" ===
To determine the best player, the four field umpires (not the goal umpires or boundary umpires) confer after each home-and-away match and award 3 votes, 2 votes and 1 vote to the players they regard as the best, second best and third best in the match respectively, based upon their perspectives of play and a set of official player statistics. On the awards night, the votes from each match are tallied, and the player(s) with the highest number of votes is awarded the medal (subject to eligibility – see below).

The current voting system has been used for the vast majority of Brownlow Medal counts. There have been different voting systems for short periods in the past:

- until 1930, only one vote was cast in each game. This was changed to the current 3–2–1 system after the 1930 season saw three players tied on four votes apiece;
- in 1976, the VFL introduced a second field umpire, and both umpires individually awarded 3–2–1 votes; this voting system was abandoned in 1978, and the two (and later, three and then four) umpires conferred to give a single set of 3–2–1 votes.

Since the rules were changed after the 1980 season, if two or more eligible players score the equal highest number of votes, each wins a Brownlow medal. Up to 1980, if two or more players were tied, a single winner was chosen on a countback:

- under the initial rules until 1930, the umpiring panel would be called to meet and agree upon a winner among the tied players
- added to the rules at some stage prior to 1930 (but without removing the previous stipulation – causing confusion in the tied 1930 count), the winner was the player who had the highest percentage of votes polled vs games played;
- after 1930, the winner was the player who had the most 3-vote games; then, if still tied, the most 2-vote games.

Even with these considerations, these countbacks failed to separate Des Fothergill and Herbie Matthews, who tied for the medal in 1940. The league decided to keep the original medal and award replica medals to the two winners. In 1989, the eight players who since the inception of the award had tied on votes but lost on a countback were awarded retrospective medals.

Player statistics have been provided to umpires to inform their voting since 2026. Until that time, umpires voted only from their perspectives of play.

=== Ineligibility ===
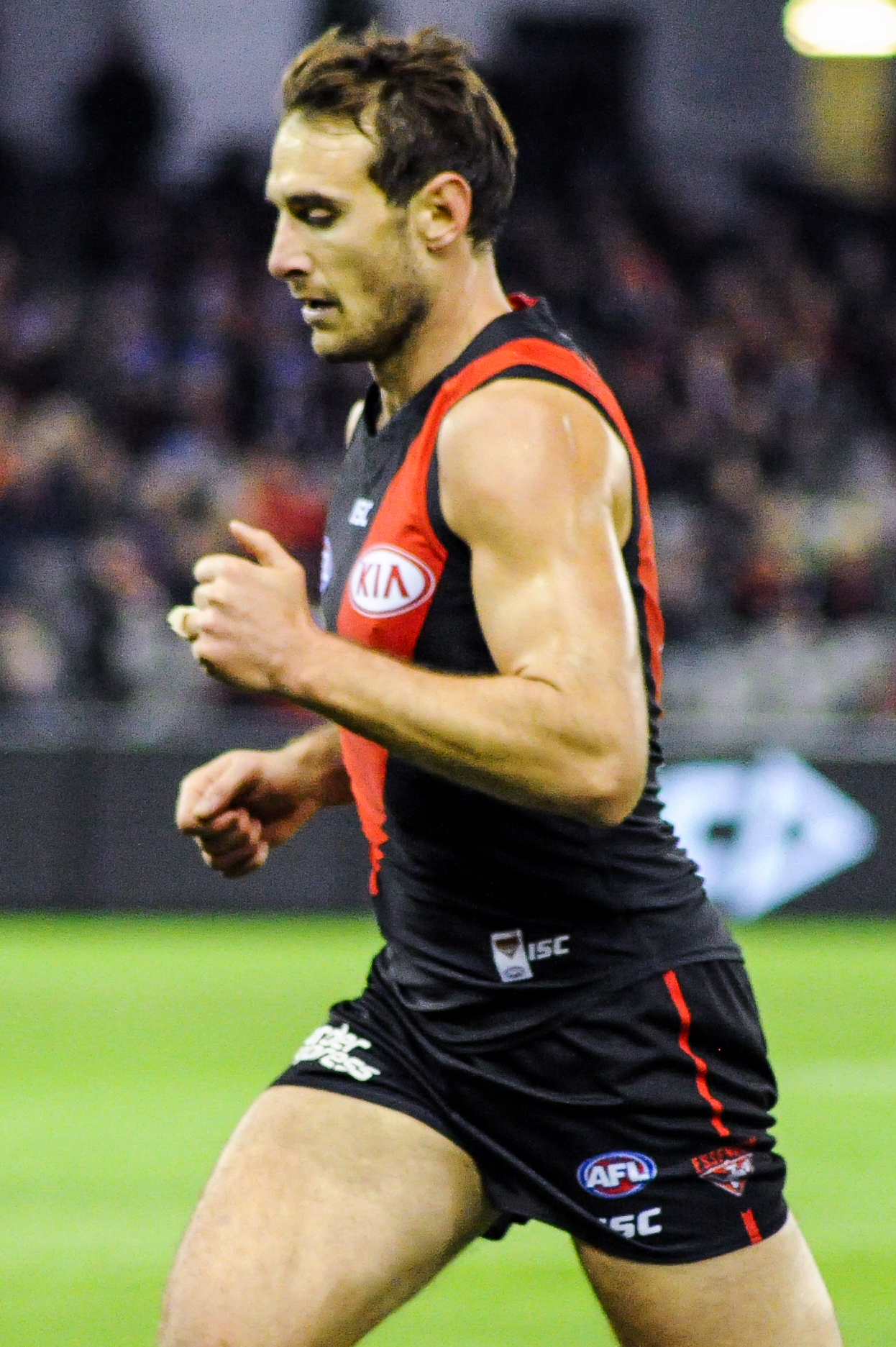
Jobe Watson was originally declared the winner of the 2012 Brownlow Medal by polling four more votes than runners up Trent Cotchin and Sam Mitchell; however, in November 2016, he was retrospectively deemed ineligible for the award due to his part in the Essendon Football Club supplements saga, and the title was given to Cotchin and Mitchell.

The fairest component of the medal is achieved by making ineligible any player who is suspended by the AFL Tribunal during the home-and-away season. An ineligible player cannot win the Brownlow Medal, regardless of the number of votes he has received.

A player remains eligible for the Brownlow Medal under the following circumstances:

- if he is suspended during the finals or pre-season;
- if he serves a suspension in the current season which was earned for an offence committed in the previous season;
- he receives any sort of club-imposed suspension which is not recognised by the AFL Tribunal;
- if he is found guilty by the AFL Tribunal of an offence which attracts only a financial penalty.

The application of the ineligibility criteria has remained fairly consistent throughout the history of the award, with some subtle changes, since it was introduced in 1931. The main exception was from 2005 until 2014, when a player would become ineligible if he committed an infringement that the Tribunal's Match Review Panel judged as being worthy of a one-game suspension, before applying adjustments based on a player's good or bad record, or for accepting an early guilty plea – meaning that players with a good record or early plea could be ineligible despite avoiding suspension, or a player with a bad record could be eligible despite having been suspended.

Umpires cast their votes for each game independent of eligibility criteria of the players; i.e. umpires can cast votes for players who have already been suspended during that season if they perceive them to be amongst the best on the ground. Prior to 1991, votes could not be awarded to a player in a match in which he was reported, but this rule was eliminated in 1991 so that a player would not be disadvantaged if he would have gained votes in a match in which he was reported but later cleared by the tribunal.

On three occasions, an ineligible player has tallied the highest number of Brownlow votes:

- In 1996, Corey McKernan received the same number of votes as the joint-winners James Hird and Michael Voss. McKernan was suspended for one match during the season for kneeing. McKernan was named the AFL Players Association MVP in the same year, which is not subject to the same eligibility criteria.
- In 1997, Chris Grant polled one more vote than winner Robert Harvey. Grant was suspended for one match during the season for striking.
- In 2012, Jobe Watson was originally declared the winner by polling four more votes than runners up Trent Cotchin and Sam Mitchell, however in November 2016, he was retrospectively deemed ineligible for the award, due to his part in the Essendon Football Club supplements saga, and the title was given to Cotchin and Mitchell.

== Criticism ==
Although the award remains the most prestigious individual award, different aspects of the award have come under criticism.

=== Eligibility ===
Some believe that suspension is not a reasonable sole measure of fairness, suggesting that many offences worthy of a one-match suspension are negligent rather than a reflection of unfairness. Prominent players, including dual-winner Chris Judd, indicated a desire to have the eligibility criterion removed from the award, effectively eliminating the "fairest" component altogether; or relaxed, Essendon coach Kevin Sheedy in 2002 suggesting that only suspensions of three to four weeks or longer should disqualify a player. This view is not universally held, and 1958 winner Neil Roberts stated in 1988 that he would hand back his medal if the fairness criterion were removed.

=== Midfielder bias ===
The award has come under scrutiny because the medal is almost always won by midfield players, with relatively few other positional players ever winning. Some put this bias down to umpires being more likely to notice players who are most immediately around them during the game, although it has been noted that most other major best and fairest award – including those voted by media and coaches – experience similar midfielder bias. The view of midfielder bias which has existed throughout the medal's history, being noted by columnist Bert Barclay as early as 1938 who wrote in The Herald: "Under the present method, men playing on the full-forward or full-back lines have little chance of winning the award usually being won by men most constantly in the play who are able to stand out in comparatively weak sides."

=== Vote stealing ===
The system is noted as favouring stronger players in comparatively weaker teams to win the Brownlow, with teams with talented sets of team-mates able steal votes off each other. This view has been around for at least 90 years, as a column in The Australasian in September 1934 wrote: "It is evident, therefore, that the system favours a good player in a weak, or comparatively weak team, as he is more frequently under notice than would be the case if the other members of the team were up to the necessary standard."

=== Vote inflation ===
Voting patterns since the 2010s have seen a sharp increase in the number of votes polled by winners, with the game's best players increasingly gaining a higher proportion of the overall votes. Whereas no player polled more than 30 votes in the count between 1940 and 1998, it is now common for multiple players to poll 30 votes in the same year, with four players doing so in 2021. The 2024 and 2025 counts saw Patrick Cripps and Matt Rowell win with 45 and 39 votes respectively – the highest and second-highest totals in history at the time – with seasons which commentators considered worthy of the medal but well short of being the greatest individual seasons of all-time. Their totals were both later surpassed by Nick Daicos in 2026. Tim Miller at the Roar wrote: "It's surely not controversial to say that Cripps' season, while excellent, was not a patch on Dustin Martin's halcyon year; while the comparisons to Brownlow counts 20 years or more ago, when 20 votes more often than not was enough to claim victory, take the Blue's Brownlow win to the point of farce."

There are several theories for why this has occurred, including: that it is a consequence of the umpires not being the best suited people to cast the votes; and that reduced prevalence of big goalkicking full forwards, fewer teams employing pure defensive taggers on midfielders, and increased use of interchange rotations to manage fatigue have all amplified the performances of the few best midfielders.

=== Voting by umpires ===
Many question whether the field umpires are the most suitable people to vote on the medal, questioning their ability to meaningfully assess players' influence on the match while focussed on impartially administering the complex laws of the game. Many alternative voters have been suggested, including the coaches, media, or an independent league-appointed panel; or under historical structures, a representative of the Umpires Board. This was also a driving factor for the change to provide umpires access to official statistics from 2026.

== Award ceremony ==
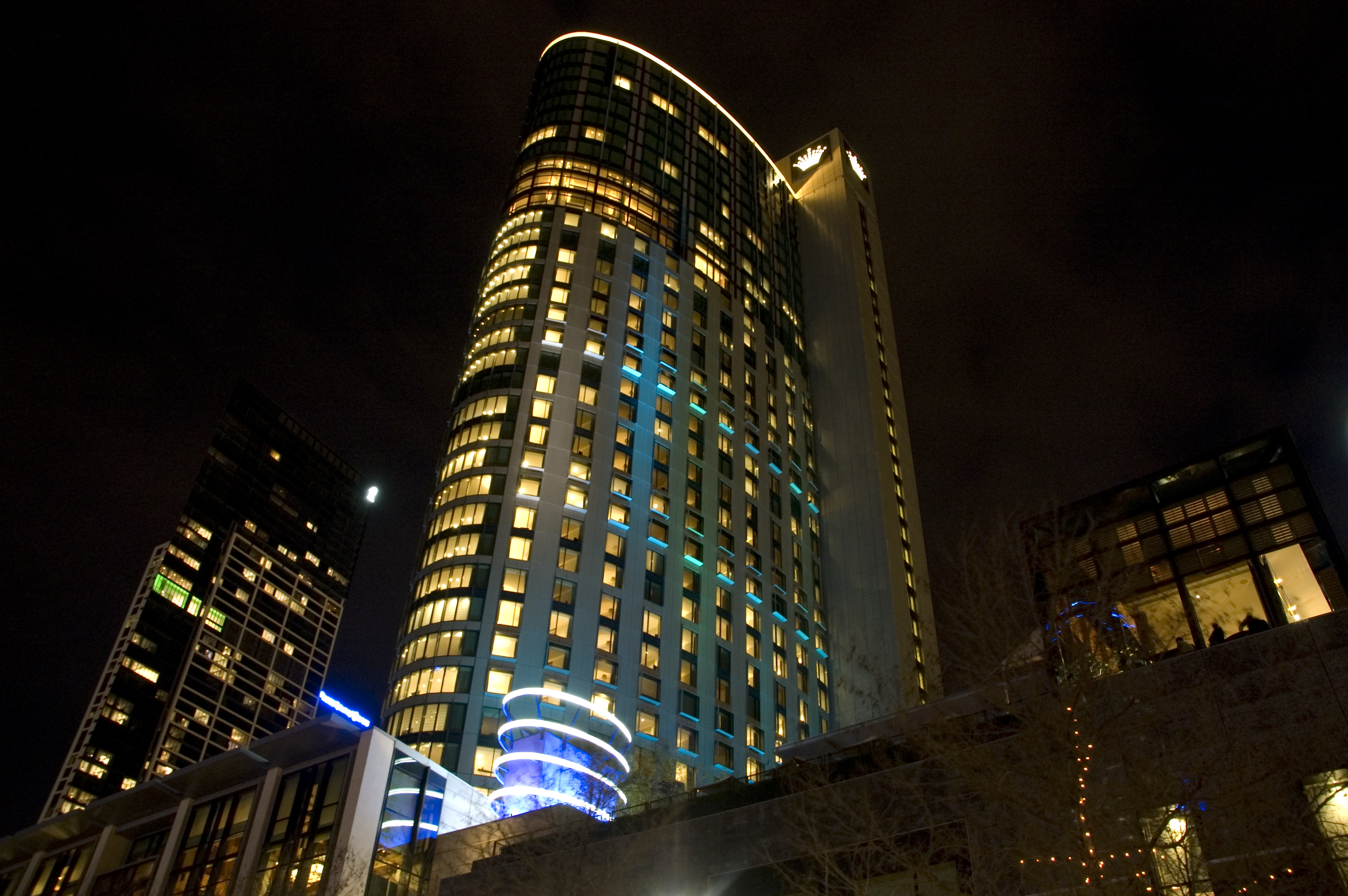
Crown Resorts, current home of the Brownlow Medal ceremony

Over the years, the award ceremony has become increasingly elaborate, with footballers and their dates gradually becoming more fashion-conscious. This aspect of the night has become widely reported by gossip columns, with the red carpet arrival often humorously referred to as the 'Gownlow'. The ceremony is currently held at Crown Melbourne on the Monday five days prior to the AFL Grand Final. Only three times since the award's inception in 1924 has the count been held outside of Melbourne: when it was held in Sydney in 1999, and in 2020 and 2021 when the event was held virtually due to the COVID-19 pandemic, preventing the event from being held in Melbourne. In years past, prospective Grand Final players have attended the ceremony in person; however, in recent years non-Victorian Grand Final teams have declined to attend the ceremony due to the inconvenience of travel in such an important week; a live video link to Brownlow functions in their home city is done instead.

The event itself consists of the votes for each match being read out in succession by the CEO of the AFL, interspersed with a retrospective look at highlights from each round of the season and commentary from the broadcast network's usual football commentary team.

The integrity of the award is upheld by the tight security and secrecy surrounding the votes. Once the umpires make their decision, the votes are locked away and transported by armoured security vehicles. No one except the three umpires knows exactly who has been voted for, and as different umpires vote on different games, no one can be sure of who will win. Unlike most award ceremonies, the votes are not tallied or even opened until they are actually announced on the night, so the drama is maintained until late on the actual night, when the result sometimes comes down to the final round of votes.

From 1959 until 1974, radio stations including 3UZ, 3KZ and 3AW broadcast the vote counts. 1116 SEN now covers the count. Direct television telecasts began in 1970, when the venue was the Dallas Brooks Hall, and have occurred every year since.

Some bookmakers offer bets on the winner of the Brownlow Medal. A number of well-publicised plunges on the betting odds of supposed winners has led to increasingly elaborate security measures to ensure the Brownlow votes are kept secret until the vote count. Over the decades, Armaguard has notably been tasked with ensuring the security and integrity of the count secrecy.

Since 1987, the theme used in the moments after the winning player has been announced is the end credits theme from The Untouchables.

== Records ==
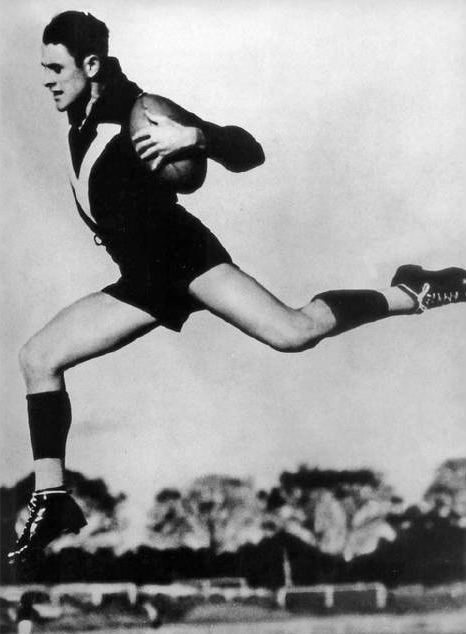
Haydn Bunton Sr., the first of four players to win three Brownlow Medals.

Most medals by player

- 3 – Haydn Bunton Sr. (Fitzroy), Dick Reynolds (Essendon), Bob Skilton (South Melbourne), Ian Stewart (St Kilda/Richmond)

Most medals by club

- 14 – Sydney/South Melbourne (1940, 1949, 1955, 1959, 1963, 1968, 1970, 1977, 1981, 1986, 1988, 1995, 2003, 2006)

Most votes in a season

- 3–2–1 voting system: 47 – Nick Daicos (Collingwood) (2026)
- All voting systems: 59 – Graham Teasdale (South Melbourne) (1977)

Most career votes

- 262 – Gary Ablett Jr. (Geelong/Gold Coast), Patrick Dangerfield (Adelaide/Geelong)

Largest winning margin (3–2–1 voting system

- 11 votes – Nick Daicos (Collingwood) (2026)
- 11 votes – Dustin Martin (Richmond) (2017)

Highest career average of votes per game

- 1.42 – Nick Daicos (Collingwood)

Most 3-vote games in a single season

- 13 – Nick Daicos (Collingwood) (2026)

Most games polling votes in a single season

- 18 – Nick Daicos (Collingwood) (2026)

Most votes per game in a single season

- 2.14 – Nick Daicos (Collingwood) (2026)

Most consecutive 3-vote games

- 6 – Nick Daicos (Collingwood) (2026)

Youngest winner

- 19 years, 91 days – Dick Reynolds (Essendon) (1934)

Oldest winner

- 31 years, 238 days – Barry Round (South Melbourne) (1981)

Winners with multiple clubs

- Ian Stewart (St Kilda, 1965 & 1966; Richmond, 1971)
- Peter Moore (Collingwood, 1979; Melbourne, 1984)
- Greg Williams (Sydney Swans, 1986; Carlton, 1994)
- Chris Judd (West Coast, 2004; Carlton, 2010)
- Gary Ablett Jr. (Geelong, 2009; Gold Coast, 2013)

Most votes by a club in a season (3–2–1 voting system)

- 116 – Essendon (2000)

Fewest votes by a club in a season (3–2–1 voting system)

- 12 – West Coast (2025)

== Changi Brownlow Medal ==
During World War II, there was an Australian rules football competition amongst the prisoners of war held at Singapore's Changi prison. There were four teams named "Geelong", "Essendon", "Collingwood" and "Carlton". The standard was reportedly high, with some of the players having appeared in the major league in Australia. At the end of the final season in 1943, Corporal Peter Chitty won a makeshift award known as the "Changi Brownlow", which his family later donated to the Australian War Memorial. It is variously claimed the medal was originally a piece of an aircraft wing or part of a kitchen utensil. The War Memorial states that it may have been an old soccer medallion found in stores and refashioned and engraved. The presentation was made by former Brownlow Medallist Wilfred Smallhorn, who was too ill to play.

== See also ==
- List of Brownlow Medal winners
- AFL Women's best and fairest
- Best and fairest
- Dally M Medal
- Norm Smith Medal
