= Robbie Gray =

Australian rules footballer (born 1988)

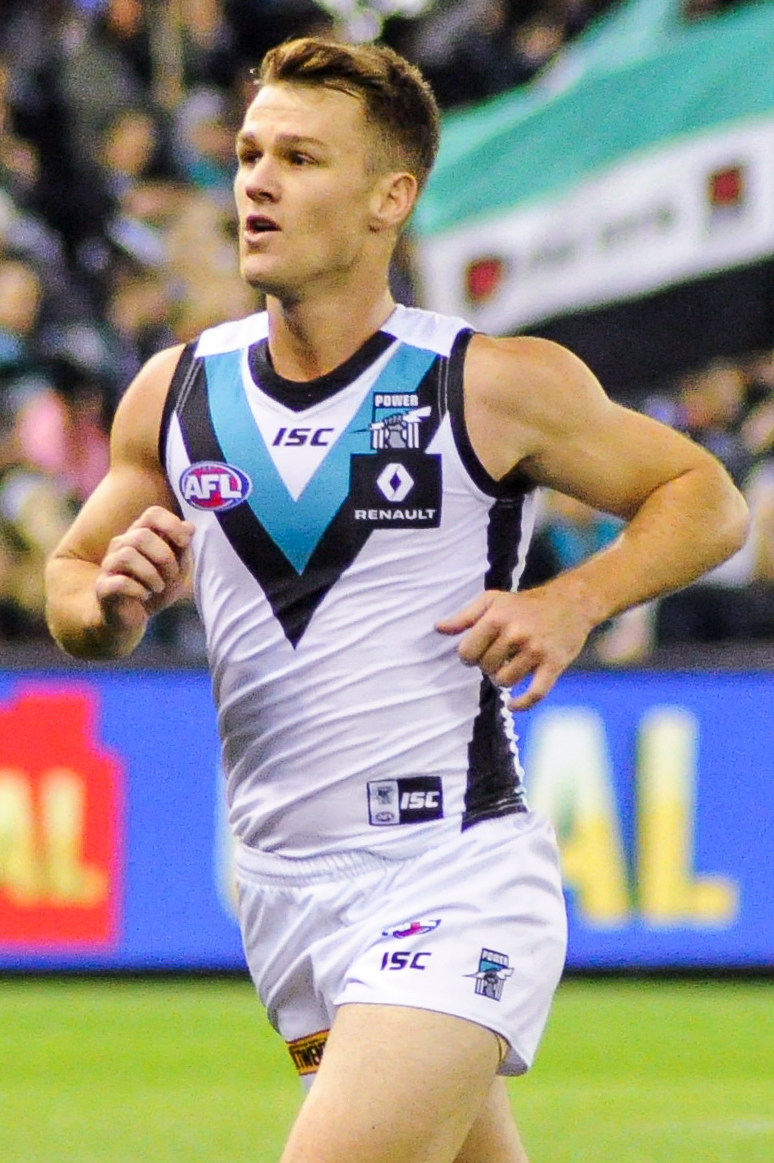
- Gray playing for Port Adelaide in June 2017

Personal information
- Full name: Robert Gray
- Nickname: Robbie Gray
- Born: 30 March 1988 (age 38); Melbourne, Victoria
- Original team: Oakleigh Chargers (TAC Cup)
- Draft: No. 55, 2006 national draft
- Height: 183 cm (6 ft 0 in)
- Weight: 84 kg (185 lb)
- Position: Forward / midfielder

Club information
- Current club: Port Adelaide
- Number: 9

Playing career^{1}
Years	Club	Games (Goals)
2007–2022	Port Adelaide	271 (367)

International team honours^{2}
Years	Team	Games (Goals)
2011–2015	Australia	3 (3)
- ^{1} Playing statistics correct to the end of 2022.^{2} Representative statistics correct as of 2014.

Career highlights
- Club: 3× John Cahill Medal (2014, 2015, 2016); 2× Port Adelaide leading goalkicker (2011, 2018); Representative: 3x games for Australia; 4× All-Australian team (2014, 2015, 2017, 2018); Honours: AFLCA Champion player of the year (2014); 5x Showdown Medal (2010, 2015, 2018x2, 2019); Peter Badcoe VC Medal (2017); AFL Rising Star nominee (2007); AFL Player Ratings team of the decade (2010s); Merv Agars Medal: 2016

Robert Gray (born 30 March 1988) is a former professional Australian rules footballer who played for the Port Adelaide Football Club in the Australian Football League (AFL). He was recruited with the 55th overall selection in the 2006 national draft. Gray is often considered to be amongst Port Adelaide's greatest ever players.

== Early life ==
The son of Robert Snr and Sue, Robbie Gray spent his early years with his two older sisters and parents in Bairnsdale. They moved to Blackburn when Robbie turned 10. He was educated Doncaster Secondary College and Box Hill Senior Secondary College.

Gray impressed in 2006 with TAC Cup club Oakleigh Chargers, kicking 56 goals. He also played for the Victoria Metro's under 18 side, in a team composed of fellow AFL draftees Bachar Houli, Matthew Kreuzer, Tom Hawkins and David Mackay. Despite this, Gray was not seen as a fancied draft option, due to his unfashionable style of play. His chances took a hit when he missed a draft camp due to injury. He did, however, attract interest from Port Adelaide after impressing their recruiters. Head recruiter at the time, Mick Moylan was impressed with his off-field discipline, with Gray maintaining an 8 and a half-hour job.

Subsequently, Gray was picked by Port Adelaide in the 2006 draft who used their fourth pick, becoming the 55th pick overall.

== AFL career ==
After showing strong form in the SANFL with West Adelaide, Gray was given his AFL debut, along with fellow draftee Justin Westhoff. Gray contributed with 13 disposals and 4 marks and 2 behinds. In Round 12 of the 2007 Season, he kicked 4 goals in a match against Essendon, in which Port Adelaide won by 31 points. He received the round 12 AFL Rising Star nomination for his efforts.

During these games Robbie Gray consolidated his place in the Power line up until a calf injury relapse against the Richmond Tigers at the MCG kept Gray out.

Gray started the 2008 pre-season strongly, suggesting he was over chronic soft tissue injuries and ready to have a larger impact. Fellow team-mate Brett Ebert said "Robbie's great. He's stronger and fitter than ever before and we saw last year just how clever he is in front of goals. Robbie's worked hard over the summer and if he can stay fit, I think he'll be in for a big year." Soft tissue injuries have restricted Gray to forward roles, though he is hoping to play more of a midfield role in the future. He also signed a new contract for Port Adelaide, which will keep him at the club until 2010. Gray missed the start of the season through injury and only received his first senior game for the year in round 7, after showing good form for West Adelaide. Gray played all matches until round 14, before injuring his ankle at training, with his best performance being a 20 possession and 12 mark game against Hawthorn. He also impressed in Ports hefty Round 16 loss to Geelong after being moved into the midfield. He returned for two matches late in the 2008 season and played a pivotal role in Port Adelaide's surprise defeat of North Melbourne, by scoring 3 goals.

Gray had an outstanding year for Port Adelaide, despite the club having a difficult year. He was Port's most valuable player according to an AFL poll, proving he is a fan favourite. He was also rated by the club's staff, who awarded him the 2009 most improved award, to go with his 4th placing in the John Cahill Medal. Gray kicked 30 goals in 2009, as well as 23 goal assists - top 6 in the AFL. He also received 6 Brownlow Medal votes, despite never polling previously. His standout performance of the year was against Hawthorn, where he kicked 4 goals in a tight win to the Power, earning 3 Brownlow votes for his efforts.

In Round 6 2010, Gray won the Showdown Medal for a five-goal effort against Adelaide.

He finished the 2011 season on 32 goals, making him the leading goalkicker, a goal ahead of Jay Schulz.

In Round 4, 2012, Gray hyper extended his knee in the dying seconds of the game against Collingwood, requiring a knee reconstruction and missing the remainder of the season.

At the start of 2013 Gray decided to change his number from 17 to 9. The number 9 was his junior number. He also wanted to start again after his knee reconstruction.

Gray had his breakout season in 2014, averaging 25 possessions and six clearances a match, while also kicking 42 goals and leading the league in goal assists. He polled votes in 18 of 22 games to win the AFL Coaches' Association (AFLCA) Champion player award and was named in the 2014 All-Australian team, as well as winning his first John Cahill Medal.

Gray backed up his break out 2014 campaign with another outstanding season in 2015. He averaged 26 disposals, almost 8 clearances and more than a goal a game. In one of his best games for 2015, he won his second Showdown Medal in the first Showdown against the Adelaide Crows. At season's end, he was selected in the All-Australian team for the second consecutive year as well as winning his second consecutive John Cahill Medal.

In 2016, Grey was awarded the Merv Agars Medal as the best performed South Australian based AFL player.

In October 2017, Port Adelaide FC released the news that Gray had been diagnosed with testicular cancer after the end of their finals campaign.

Gray returned to pre-season training late in 2017 and played the entire 2018 AFL season. In Showdown 44, Gray kicked six goals, 5 of them were in the third quarter. He eventually won the Showdown Medal as being the best player on the ground. He is currently Port Adelaide's 2nd leading AFL goalkicker, behind Warren Tredrea.

Gray played game 250 in 2021 against the Gold Coast Suns, but injured his ankle in the same game. As a result, Gray would miss 6 weeks of the season.

Robbie Gray being chaired off Adelaide Oval by Ollie Wines and Travis Boak in his final game.

Persistent knee niggles kept Gray to only 16 games in the 2022 season. He announced his retirement on 16 August 2022, and would fittingly play his retirement game in Showdown LII.

== Statistics ==
Statistics are correct as of the end of the 2022 season

Legend
G	Goals	K	Kicks	D	Disposals	T	Tackles
B	Behinds	H	Handballs	M	Marks

Season	Team	No.	Games	Totals							Averages (per game)						
Season	Team	No.	Games	G	B	K	H	D	M	T	G	B	K	H	D	M	T
2007	Port Adelaide	17	5	7	6	33	19	52	18	7	1.4	1.2	6.6	3.8	10.4	3.6	1.4
2008	Port Adelaide	17	10	15	12	76	55	131	52	12	1.5	1.2	7.6	5.5	13.1	5.2	1.2
2009	Port Adelaide	17	20	30	19	157	166	323	77	62	1.5	1.0	7.9	8.3	16.2	3.9	3.1
2010	Port Adelaide	17	11	18	12	81	79	160	34	36	1.6	1.1	7.4	7.2	14.5	3.1	3.3
2011	Port Adelaide	17	22	32	14	216	179	395	81	85	1.5	0.6	9.8	8.1	18.0	3.7	3.9
2012	Port Adelaide	17	2	2	4	13	16	29	6	9	1.0	2.0	6.5	8.0	14.5	3.0	4.5
2013	Port Adelaide	9	20	15	15	187	150	337	62	72	0.8	0.8	9.4	7.5	16.9	3.1	3.6
2014	Port Adelaide	9	25	42	33	302	320	622	97	69	1.7	1.3	12.1	12.8	24.9	3.9	2.8
2015	Port Adelaide	9	21	25	12	252	300	552	60	91	1.2	0.6	12.0	14.3	26.3	2.9	4.3
2016	Port Adelaide	9	19	25	16	237	262	499	51	91	1.2	0.8	11.3	12.5	23.8	2.4	4.3
2017	Port Adelaide	9	23	47	29	232	204	436	99	58	2.2	1.4	11.0	9.7	20.8	4.7	2.8
2018	Port Adelaide	9	21	36	18	193	246	439	74	67	1.7	0.9	9.2	11.7	20.9	3.5	3.2
2019	Port Adelaide	9	19	24	14	189	232	421	71	42	1.3	0.7	9.9	12.2	22.2	3.7	2.2
2020 (Note: The 2020 season was played with 17 home-and-away matches per team (down from 22) and 16-minute quarters with time on (down from 20-minute quarters with time on) due to the impact of the COVID-19 pandemic.)	Port Adelaide	9	19	15	7	127	188	315	40	56	0.8	0.4	6.7	9.9	16.6	2.1	2.9
2021	Port Adelaide	9	18	20	8	157	161	318	67	48	1.1	0.4	8.8	8.9	17.7	3.7	2.7
2022	Port Adelaide	9	16	14	7	96	131	227	48	42	0.9	0.4	6.0	8.2	14.2	3.0	2.6
Career			271	367	226	2548	2708	5256	937	847	1.4	0.8	9.4	10.0	19.4	3.5	3.1

== Honours and achievements ==
Team

- McClelland Trophy/AFL minor premiership: (Port Adelaide) 2020

Brownlow Medal votes
Season	Votes
2007	0
2008	0
2009	6
2010	3
2011	6
2012	0
2013	0
2014	14
2015	13
2016	19
2017	12
2018	8
2019	10
2020	5
2021	1
Total	97

Individual

- All-Australian: 2014, 2015, 2017, 2018
- AFLCA Champion Player of the Year Award: 2014
- Showdown Medal: 2010 (Round 6), 2015 (Round 5), 2018 (Round 8), 2018 (Round 20), 2019 (Round 16)
- Australian Representative Honours in International Rules Football: 2011, 2014, 2015
- Port Adelaide F.C. Leading Club Goalkicker Award: 2011, 2018
- Port Adelaide F.C. Most Improved Player Award: 2009
- Peter Badcoe VC Medal: 2017
- AFL Rising Star Nominee: 2007 (Round 12)
