= 2015 All-Australian team =

The 2015 Virgin Australia All-Australian team represents the best performed Australian Football League (AFL) players during the 2015 season. It was announced on 22 September as a complete Australian rules football team of 22 players. The team is honorary and does not play any games.

== Selection panel ==
The selection panel for the 2015 All-Australian team consisted of chairman Gillon McLachlan, Kevin Bartlett, Luke Darcy, Mark Evans, Danny Frawley, Glen Jakovich, Cameron Ling, Matthew Richardson and Warren Tredrea.

== Team ==
=== Initial squad ===
The initial 40-man squad was announced on 8 September. For the first time since 2006, neither Lance Franklin nor Geelong received a nomination.

Club	Total	Player(s)
Adelaide	4	Eddie Betts, Patrick Dangerfield, Rory Laird, Taylor Walker
Brisbane Lions	0	
Carlton	0	
Collingwood	2	Scott Pendlebury, Dane Swan
Essendon	1	Michael Hurley
Fremantle	5	Nat Fyfe, Stephen Hill, Garrick Ibbotson, David Mundy, Lachie Neale
Geelong	0	
Gold Coast	0	
Greater Western Sydney	2	Jeremy Cameron, Heath Shaw
Hawthorn	6	Shaun Burgoyne, Josh Gibson, Jack Gunston, Jordan Lewis, Sam Mitchell, Cyril Rioli
Melbourne	0	
North Melbourne	2	Todd Goldstein, Shaun Higgins
Port Adelaide	2	Robbie Gray, Chad Wingard
Richmond	4	Brett Deledio, Dustin Martin, Alex Rance, Jack Riewoldt
St Kilda	0	
Sydney	2	Dan Hannebery, Josh Kennedy
West Coast	5	Andrew Gaff, Josh Kennedy, Jeremy McGovern, Nic Naitanui, Matt Priddis
Western Bulldogs	5	Matthew Boyd, Luke Dahlhaus, Robert Murphy, Jake Stringer, Easton Wood

=== Final team ===
Hawthorn, Richmond, West Coast and the Western Bulldogs had the most selections, with three each. Western Bulldogs captain Robert Murphy was announced as the All-Australian captain, with West Coast forward Josh Kennedy announced as vice-captain. The team saw eleven players selected in an All-Australian side for the first time in their careers.

2015 All-Australian team
B:	Josh Gibson (Hawthorn)	Alex Rance (Richmond)	Heath Shaw (Greater Western Sydney)
HB:	Easton Wood (Western Bulldogs)	Michael Hurley (Essendon)	Robert Murphy (Western Bulldogs) (captain)
C:	Dan Hannebery (Sydney)	Matt Priddis (West Coast)	Andrew Gaff (West Coast)
HF:	Chad Wingard (Port Adelaide)	Jack Riewoldt (Richmond)	Cyril Rioli (Hawthorn)
F:	Eddie Betts (Adelaide)	Josh Kennedy (West Coast) (vice-captain)	Jake Stringer (Western Bulldogs)
Foll:	Todd Goldstein (North Melbourne)	Nat Fyfe (Fremantle)	Patrick Dangerfield (Adelaide)
Int:	Brett Deledio (Richmond)	Robbie Gray (Port Adelaide)	Sam Mitchell (Hawthorn)
Int:	David Mundy (Fremantle)		
Coach:	Alastair Clarkson (Hawthorn)		

Note: the position of coach in the All-Australian team is traditionally awarded to the coach of the premiership team.
