= 2014 All-Australian team =

The 2014 Virgin Australia All-Australian team represents the best performed Australian Football League (AFL) players during the 2014 season. It was announced on 16 September as a complete Australian rules football team of 22 players. The team is honorary and does not play any games.

== Selection panel ==
The selection panel for the 2014 All-Australian team consisted of chairman Gillon McLachlan, Kevin Bartlett, Luke Darcy, Mark Evans, Danny Frawley, Glen Jakovich, Cameron Ling, Matthew Richardson and Warren Tredrea.

== Team ==
=== Initial squad ===
| Club | Total | Player(s) |
|---|---|---|
| Adelaide | 4 | Eddie Betts, Sam Jacobs, Brodie Smith, Daniel Talia |
| Brisbane Lions | 1 | Tom Rockliff |
| Carlton | 1 | Bryce Gibbs |
| Collingwood | 2 | Dayne Beams, Scott Pendlebury |
| Essendon | 2 | Dyson Heppell, Cale Hooker |
| Fremantle | 3 | Hayden Ballantyne, Nathan Fyfe, Aaron Sandilands |
| Geelong | 4 | Tom Hawkins, Tom Lonergan, Joel Selwood, Harry Taylor |
| Gold Coast | 1 | Gary Ablett Jr. |
| Greater Western Sydney | 1 | Callan Ward |
| Hawthorn | 5 | Luke Breust, Shaun Burgoyne, Jack Gunston, Jordan Lewis, Jarryd Roughead |
| Melbourne | 0 | |
| North Melbourne | 1 | Brent Harvey |
| Port Adelaide | 3 | Travis Boak, Robbie Gray, Jay Schulz |
| Richmond | 3 | Brandon Ellis, Dustin Martin, Alex Rance |
| St Kilda | 1 | Nick Riewoldt |
| Sydney | 5 | Lance Franklin, Josh Kennedy, Nick Malceski, Luke Parker, Nick Smith |
| West Coast | 2 | Eric Mackenzie, Matt Priddis |
| Western Bulldogs | 1 | Tom Liberatore |

=== Final team ===
2014 All-Australian team
| B: | Cale Hooker (Essendon) | Daniel Talia (Adelaide) | Nick Smith (Sydney) |
| HB: | Nick Malceski (Sydney) | Alex Rance (Richmond) | Brodie Smith (Adelaide) |
| C: | Nathan Fyfe (Fremantle) | Josh Kennedy (Sydney) | Dyson Heppell (Essendon) |
| HF: | Robbie Gray (Port Adelaide) | Nick Riewoldt (St Kilda) (vice-captain) | Luke Breust (Hawthorn) |
| F: | Hayden Ballantyne (Fremantle) | Lance Franklin (Sydney) | Jarryd Roughead (Hawthorn) |
| Foll: | Aaron Sandilands (Fremantle) | Joel Selwood (Geelong) (captain) | Gary Ablett Jr. (Gold Coast) |
| Int: | Jordan Lewis (Hawthorn) | Scott Pendlebury (Collingwood) | Travis Boak (Port Adelaide) |
| Int: | Tom Rockliff (Brisbane Lions) | | |
| Coach: | Alastair Clarkson (Hawthorn) | | |

Note: the position of coach in the All-Australian team is traditionally awarded to the coach of the premiership team.

West Coast midfielder Matt Priddis won that year's Brownlow Medal, but didn't make the final All-Australian team. It was the first time this had happened since Melbourne midfielder Shane Woewodin missed selection in 2000.
