= 2014 Brownlow Medal =

- Date: 22 September
- Location: Crown Palladium
- Hosted by: Bruce McAvaney
- Winner: Matt Priddis (West Coast); 26 votes

Television/radio coverage
- Network: Seven Network; Fox Footy

The 2014 Brownlow Medal was the 87th year the award was presented to the player adjudged the fairest and best player during the Australian Football League (AFL) home and away season. Matt Priddis of the West Coast Eagles won the medal by polling twenty-six votes during the 2014 AFL season. Defending Brownlow Medallist Gary Ablett of the Gold Coast Football Club was the short-priced favourite for the medal until he suffered a season-ending shoulder injury in round 16. Betting on the medal was suspended while the extent of the injury to Ablett was determined. Geelong captain Joel Selwood, Collingwood captain Scott Pendlebury and Sydney's Josh Kennedy were considered to be among the new favourites in the wake of Ablett's injury, but at the end of the season Ablett was still second favourite to have polled enough votes before his injury to win the award. He ended up polling the equal-third most votes, tying with Sydney's Lance Franklin on 22 votes.

== Leading vote-getters ==
	Player	Votes
1st	Matt Priddis (West Coast)	26
	Nat Fyfe (Fremantle)*	25
=2nd	Gary Ablett Jr. (Gold Coast)	22
=2nd	Lance Franklin (Sydney)	22
=4th	Travis Boak (Port Adelaide)	21
=4th	Patrick Dangerfield (Adelaide)	21
=4th	Josh Kennedy (Sydney)	21
=4th	Joel Selwood (Geelong)	21
	Steve Johnson (Geelong)*	19
8th	Trent Cotchin (Richmond)	18
=9th	Dayne Beams (Collingwood)	16
=9th	Scott Pendlebury (Collingwood)	16

* The player was ineligible to win the medal due to suspension by the AFL Tribunal during the year.

== Voting procedure ==
The three field umpires (those umpires who control the flow of the game, as opposed to goal or boundary umpires) confer after each match and award three votes, two votes, and one vote to the players they regard as the best, second-best and third-best in the match, respectively. The votes are kept secret until the awards night, and they are read and tallied on the evening.

As the medal is awarded to the fairest and best player in the league, those who have been suspended during the season by the AFL Tribunal (or, who avoided suspension only because of a discount for a good record or an early guilty plea) are ineligible to win the award; however, they may still continue to poll votes. The most notable 2014 case was Fremantle's Nat Fyfe; after Ablett's injury, Fyfe became the strong favourite to poll the most votes, but he was already ineligible after being suspended for two weeks for a bump on Gold Coast's Michael Rischitelli in round 2, and he was suspended again for two weeks after striking Hawthorn's Jordan Lewis in round 21.
