= 2015 Brownlow Medal =

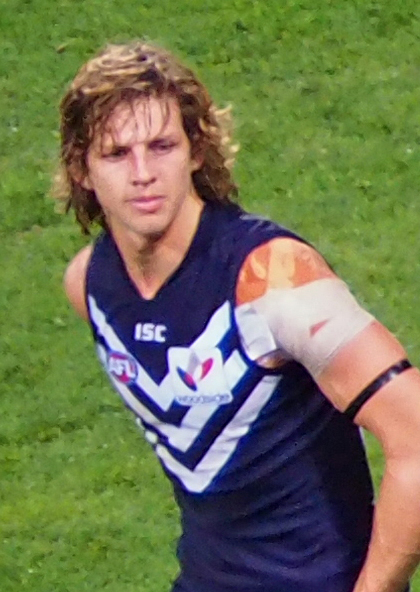
- 2015 Brownlow Medallist, Nat Fyfe
- Date: 28 September
- Location: Crown Palladium
- Hosted by: Bruce McAvaney
- Winner: Nat Fyfe (Fremantle); 31 votes

Television/radio coverage
- Network: Seven Network; Fox Footy

The 2015 Brownlow Medal was the 88th year the award was presented to the player adjudged the fairest and best player during the Australian Football League (AFL) home and away season. Nat Fyfe of the Fremantle Football Club won the medal by polling thirty-one votes during the 2015 AFL season. He became the first Fremantle player to win the Brownlow Medal.

== Leading vote-getters ==
	Player	Votes
1st	Nat Fyfe (Fremantle)	31
2nd	Matt Priddis (West Coast)	28
3rd	Sam Mitchell (Hawthorn)	26
4th	Josh Kennedy (Sydney)	25
5th	Dan Hannebery (Sydney)	24
6th	Patrick Dangerfield (Adelaide)	22
7th	Dustin Martin (Richmond)	21
=8th	David Mundy (Fremantle)	19
=8th	Callan Ward (Greater Western Sydney)	19
10th	Todd Goldstein (North Melbourne)	18

== Voting procedure ==
The three field umpires (those umpires who control the flow of the game, as opposed to goal or boundary umpires) confer after each match and award three votes, two votes, and one vote to the players they regard as the best, second-best and third-best in the match, respectively. The votes are kept secret until the awards night, and they are read and tallied on the evening.

A change was made in 2015 to the rules under which players could become ineligible for the Brownlow Medal. Under previous rules, players were ineligible if found guilty at the AFL Tribunal of an offence with a base penalty equal to or greater than a one-match suspension, even if the player then avoided suspension by taking an early guilty plea after the Match Review Panel's findings. Under the new rules:

- The penalty for all low-end offences for which a player could previously have received a reprimand but avoided suspension was changed to a $1000 fine for the first offence within a season, a $1500 fine for the second offence within a season, and a one-match suspension for the third offence within a season
- Players would become ineligible for the Brownlow medal only if they incurred a suspension

Due to these changes, there were just 34 players ineligible in 2015, compared with 61 in 2014.

On 3 July 2015, the round 14 match between Adelaide and Geelong was cancelled following the death of Adelaide coach, Phil Walsh, resulting in players from those teams having one fewer game available to them to poll votes. Various commentators made proposals to remove this disadvantage, such as removing all round 14 votes from the count or awarding double votes for the return match between Adelaide and Geelong in round 23; but the AFL rejected all proposals, pointing out that the disadvantage to the players involved was no different from the case of players who had missed the chance to poll votes in previous Brownlow medals due to their participation in interstate matches. The missing game ended up having no impact on the medal, as the highest-polling player from those clubs (Adelaide's Patrick Dangerfield) was nine votes behind the winner.
