= David Wheadon =

Australian rules footballer (born 1948)

Personal information
- Full name: David Wheadon
- Born: 7 May 1948 (age 78)
- Original team: Colac
- Height: 177 cm (5 ft 10 in)
- Weight: 74 kg (163 lb)
- Position: Rover

Playing career^{1}
Years	Club	Games (Goals)
1968–70	Collingwood	19 (4)
- ^{1} Playing statistics correct to the end of 1970.

David Wheadon is a former Australian rules footballer who played with Collingwood in the Victorian Football League (VFL).
