= 2019 Brownlow Medal =

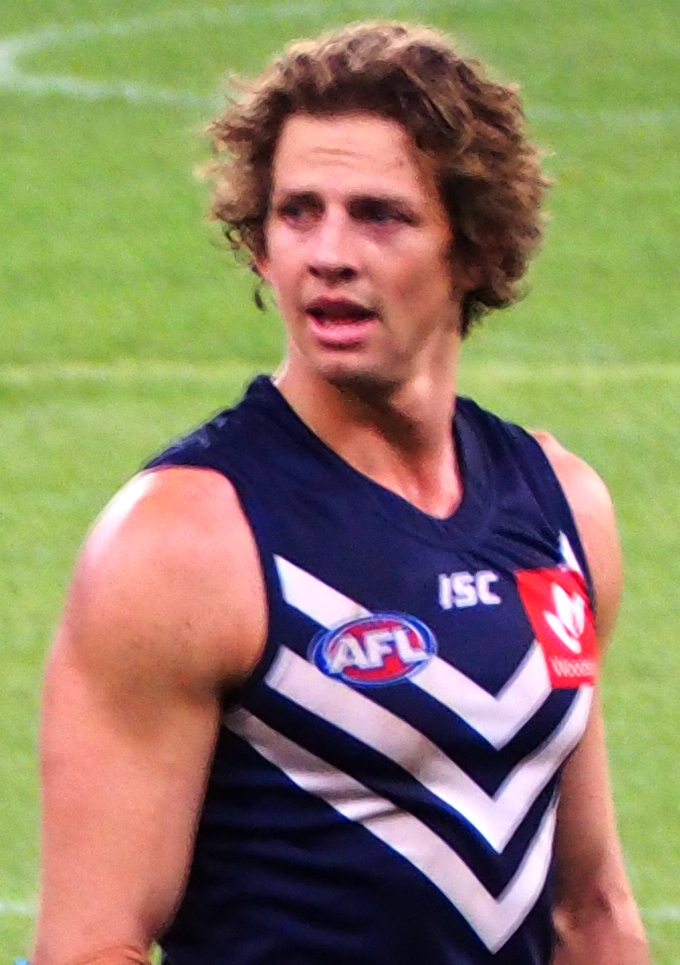
- 2019 Brownlow Medallist, Nat Fyfe
- Date: 23 September 2019
- Location: Crown Palladium
- Hosted by: Hamish McLachlan
- Winner(s): Nat Fyfe (Fremantle) (33 votes)

Television/radio coverage
- Network: Seven Network; Telstra

The 2019 Brownlow Medal was the 92nd year the award was presented to the player adjudged the best and fairest player during the Australian Football League (AFL) home-and-away season. Nat Fyfe was the winner for the second time, with 33 votes.

== Leading vote-getters ==
	Player	Votes
1st	Nat Fyfe (Fremantle)	33
2nd	Patrick Dangerfield (Geelong)	27
=3rd	Patrick Cripps (Carlton)	26
=3rd	Lachie Neale (Brisbane Lions)	26
5th	Tim Kelly (Geelong)	25
6th	Brodie Grundy (Collingwood)	23
	Dustin Martin (Richmond)	23*
=7th	Marcus Bontempelli (Western Bulldogs)	22
=7th	Jack Macrae (Western Bulldogs)	22
9th	Dayne Zorko (Brisbane Lions)	19

* The player was ineligible to win the medal due to suspension by the AFL Tribunal during the year.

== Voting procedure ==
The three field umpires (those umpires who control the flow of the game, as opposed to goal or boundary umpires) confer after each match and award three votes, two votes, and one vote to the players they regard as the best, second-best and third-best in the match, respectively. The votes are kept secret until the awards night, and they are read and tallied on the evening.
