= Matt Priddis =

Australian rules footballer (born 1985)

Personal information
- Full name: Matthew Harley Priddis
- Born: 21 March 1985 (age 41)
- Original team: Sorrento-Duncraig JFC
- Draft: No. 31, 2006 rookie draft
- Height: 185 cm (6 ft 1 in)
- Weight: 86 kg (190 lb)
- Position: Midfielder

Playing career^{1}
Years	Club	Games (Goals)
2006–2017	West Coast	240 (73)

Representative team honours
Years	Team	Games (Goals)
2004–2005	Western Australia	2 (3)
- ^{1} Playing statistics correct to the end of 2017.

Career highlights
- Brownlow Medal: (2014); All-Australian: (2015); John Worsfold Medal: (2013); West Coast captain: (2014); Simpson Medal: (2005); Sandover Medal: (2006); 2x Geoff Christian Medal: (2011, 2014); 2x Ross Glendinning Medal: (2011, 2016)

Matthew Harley Priddis (born 21 March 1985) is a former professional Australian rules footballer who played for the West Coast Eagles in the Australian Football League (AFL).

Prior to being drafted, Priddis won two premierships with the Subiaco Football Club in the West Australian Football League (WAFL) and also won the 2006 Sandover Medal as the league's best player. An inside midfielder, he debuted for West Coast during the 2006 season, becoming a regular in the team the following season. Priddis won the John Worsfold Medal as West Coast's best and fairest player in the 2013 season, and has been runner-up in the award on another four occasions.

Following Darren Glass's retirement midway through the 2014 season, Priddis was named acting co-captain. At the end of the season, he was awarded the 2014 Brownlow Medal as the competition's best and fairest player, becoming only the third West Coast player to win the award (after Chris Judd and Ben Cousins). He also finished runner-up to Nat Fyfe in the 2015 Brownlow Medal count. In 2017, Priddis broke Lenny Hayes' record for the most career tackles in the AFL, becoming the first player to surpass the 1,500 mark.

== Early career ==
Priddis was raised in Manjimup, a country town in Western Australia's south-west region, but moved to Perth, the state's capital, as a teenager, playing at junior level for Sorrento–Duncraig. He represented Western Australia at both under-16 and under-18 level respectively, in addition to also making his senior debut for Subiaco in the West Australian Football League (WAFL) as well, playing two games early in the 2003 season. Priddis became a regular in Subiaco's senior side during the 2004 season. He played 21 games, including Subiaco's win over Claremont in the Grand Final, en route to ultimately being named the WAFL's Rising Star at the end of the season. At the end of the season, he was offered a well-paid contract in the South Australian National Football League (SANFL), but turned it down on the advice of Subiaco's coach, Peter German. During the 2005 season, Priddis won Subiaco's best and fairest award, the Tom Outridge Medal, as well as also winning the Simpson Medal as Western Australia's best player in the state game against Queensland. He was subsequently selected by West Coast with the 31st pick in the 2006 Rookie Draft, but only after he had already been overlooked in three previous national drafts.

== AFL career ==
Priddis made his AFL debut for West Coast midway through the 2006 season, aged 21, recording 19 disposals and five tackles against Geelong. He played one further AFL game during the season, against Port Adelaide, spending the remainder of the season in the WAFL. Priddis averaged over 31 disposals per game at WAFL level, playing in a second premiership for Subiaco and winning the Sandover Medal with 58 votes at the end of the season, a competition record (since equalled by Kane Mitchell in 2012).

Having been upgraded to West Coast's senior list for the 2007 season, Priddis recorded 45 disposals, 30 handballs, 15 kicks, 5 marks and 3 tackles in round 14, 2008 against Hawthorn. His 30 handpasses was then the highest tally ever recorded (recorded since 1987), until Gary Ablett, Jr. broke the record the following season. During the 2013 season, Priddis played his 150th game for West Coast, becoming a life member of the club. At the end of the season, he was awarded West Coast's best and fairest award, the newly named John Worsfold Medal. He had finished second in the award in 2010, 2011 (tied 1st with Darren Glass but lost on countback), 2014 (his Brownlow season), and 2015.

After Darren Glass retired midway through the 2014 season, Priddis was named acting co-captain of the club for the remainder of the season, along with four other players. He had been a member of the club's leadership group since the 2009 season. He finished the home-and-away-season ranked first in disposals (637) second in contested possessions (330) and third in tackles (161). Priddis was awarded the Brownlow Medal as the AFL's best and fairest player at the end of the season. Polling 26 votes, Priddis became the third West Coast player to win the award and the second person, after Haydn Bunton, Sr., to have won both a Brownlow Medal and a Sandover Medal. He also became the first player to win the award having begun his career on the rookie list. Priddis' best previous finish came in the 2011 Brownlow Medal count when, with 19 votes, he finished equal seventh.

Priddis carried his exceptional form into the 2015 AFL season, playing 24 games and kicking 7 goals. He averaged 29.6 disposals per game and had a total of 711 for the season, which was 84 more disposals than the previous year. Priddis laid a total of 176 tackles, going at 7.3 tackles per game. He was named in the Centre of the 2015 All-Australian team, after missing out on selection in the final team the previous season. He polled a total of 28 votes in the 2015 Brownlow Medal coming a close second behind fellow West Australian, Nat Fyfe. He ultimately finished second behind Andrew Gaff in the John Worsfold Medal. The Eagles made it to the 2015 AFL Grand Final, but were ultimately defeated by Hawthorn, with Priddis being named in the best players, tallying 25 disposals and 7 tackles.

The 2016 AFL season saw Priddis average 27.1 disposals and 8.5 tackles per game, he played 22 games and had a total of 597 disposals for the season. He polled 17 votes in the 2016 Brownlow Medal to finish equal 9th.

After laying 11 tackles against Hawthorn in round five of the 2017 season, Priddis simultaneously broke Lenny Hayes' record for the most AFL career tackles and became the first player to lay 1,500 career tackles.

The 2017 season saw Priddis average 24.7 disposals per game, tallying 519 for the season. He also averaged 7.8 tackles per game and played 21 games.

On 28 July 2017, he announced his retirement from the AFL at the end of the 2017 season. Matt Priddis played the final game of his career in the semi-final, where he collected 30 disposals and 7 tackles in a 67-point loss to the GWS Giants.

== Playing style ==
Known for his "unusually strong legs and hips", as well as his "thirst for hard work" and "football smarts", Priddis was regarded as both a specialist at stoppages and as "one of the league's most reliable workhorses". He generally played as an inside midfielder and led the AFL in average handballs in 2010, 2011 and 2012, as well as in total handballs in 2011, with additionally high rankings in the categories of both clearances and contested possessions. Priddis was also known for his tackling ability, having averaged more than five tackles per game in all but his first season. His figure of 193 tackles for the 2011 season has only been beaten by teammate Scott Selwood (202 during the same year) since tackles were first recorded in 1987, while his 18 tackles against Richmond during the 2014 season is tied for third most tackles in an AFL game. On 23 April 2017, he passed Lenny Hayes' record for the highest number of tackles in a playing career.

== Statistics ==
Legend
G	Goals	K	Kicks	D	Disposals	T	Tackles
B	Behinds	H	Handballs	M	Marks

Led the league for the season only

Season	Team	No.	Games	Totals							Averages (per game)						
Season	Team	No.	Games	G	B	K	H	D	M	T	G	B	K	H	D	M	T
2006	West Coast	45	2	0	0	19	12	31	6	9	0.0	0.0	9.5	6.0	15.5	3.0	4.5
2007	West Coast	11	24	11	4	305	260	565	73	128	0.5	0.2	12.7	10.8	23.5	3.0	5.3
2008	West Coast	11	18	2	9	202	228	430	44	103	0.1	0.5	11.2	12.7	23.9	2.4	5.7
2009	West Coast	11	20	6	8	200	309	509	55	127	0.3	0.4	10.0	15.5	25.5	2.8	6.4
2010	West Coast	11	19	4	5	152	336	488	36	130	0.2	0.3	8.0	17.7	25.7	1.9	6.8
2011	West Coast	11	25	9	5	276	386	662	76	193	0.4	0.2	11.0	15.4	26.5	3.0	7.7
2012	West Coast	11	22	8	3	196	379	575	60	122	0.4	0.1	8.9	17.2	26.1	2.7	5.5
2013	West Coast	11	21	6	5	221	344	565	49	129	0.3	0.2	10.5	16.4	26.9	2.3	6.1
2014	West Coast	11	22	10	8	261	366	627	56	161	0.5	0.4	11.9	16.6	28.5	2.5	7.3
2015	West Coast	11	24	7	5	239	472	711	44	176	0.3	0.2	10.0	19.7	29.6	1.8	7.3
2016	West Coast	11	22	4	4	214	383	597	40	188	0.2	0.2	9.7	17.4	27.1	1.8	8.5
2017	West Coast	11	21	6	6	178	341	519	48	163	0.3	0.3	8.5	16.2	24.7	2.3	7.8
Career			240	73	62	2463	3816	6279	587	1629	0.3	0.3	10.3	15.9	26.2	2.4	6.8

== Honours and achievements ==
**Brownlow Medal votes**
Season	Votes
2006	—
2007	9
2008	5
2009	7
2010	13
2011	19
2012	9
2013	13
**2014**	**26**
2015	28
2016	17
2017	3
**Total**	**149**
Key:
Green / **Bold** = Won * = joint winner
Red / Italics = Ineligible

AFL

- **Team**
  - **McClelland Trophy/AFL minor premiership (West Coast)** 2006
  - West Coast Co-Captain (Acting): 2014
- **Individual**
  - Brownlow Medal: 2014
  - John Worsfold Medal (West Coast B&F): 2013
  - Geoff Christian Medal: 2011 & 2014
  - Ross Glendinning Medal: 2011 (Round 8), 2016 (Round 3)

WAFL

- **Team**
  - WAFL Premiership (Subiaco): 2004, 2006
- **Individual**
  - Sandover Medal (WAFL B&F): 2006
  - Simpson Medal (State Match): 2005
  - Tom Outridge Medal (Subiaco F.C. B&F): 2005
  - WAFL Rising Star: 2004

== Personal life ==
Matthew Priddis and his wife, Ashleigh Priddis, a schoolteacher, married in 2009. They have two daughters and one son. Prior to being drafted into the AFL, he worked as a tiler, and was also involved in surf lifesaving. Priddis is distinguishable on the football field by his "distinctive shock of curly hair".

== See also ==
- List of AFL debuts in 2006
- List of Brownlow Medal winners
- List of West Coast Eagles players
