= 2015 AFL season =

119th season of the Australian Football League (AFL)

2015 AFL premiership season
- Teams: 18
- Premiers: Hawthorn; 13th premiership
- Minor premiers: Fremantle; 1st minor premiership
- Brownlow Medallist: Nat Fyfe; Fremantle (31 votes)
- Coleman Medallist: Josh Kennedy; West Coast (75 goals)

Attendance
- Matches played: 206
- Total attendance: 6,886,266 (33,428 per match)
- Highest (H&A): 88,395 (round 4, Essendon v Collingwood)
- Highest (finals): 98,633 (Grand Final, Hawthorn vs. West Coast)

The 2015 AFL season was the 119th season of the Australian Football League (AFL), the highest level senior Australian rules football competition in Australia, which was known as the Victorian Football League until 1989. The season featured eighteen clubs, ran from 2 April until 3 October, and comprised a 22-game home-and-away season followed by a finals series featuring the top eight clubs.

The premiership was won by the Hawthorn Football Club for the 13th time and third time consecutively, after it defeated West Coast by 46 points in the 2015 AFL Grand Final.

The season was marred by the mid-season death of Adelaide senior coach Phil Walsh, who was the victim of a domestic incident. Adelaide's following match was cancelled.

== Pre-season ==
=== All Stars game ===
The biennial All Stars game, this year played in Western Australia, featuring an AFL team and the Indigenous All Stars team made up of some of the best Indigenous players in the game, returned for the 2015 pre-season. West Coast was the All Stars' opponent, and the match was played at Medibank Stadium in Perth.

2015 Indigenous All Stars Game
Friday, 20 February 7:45 pm (AWST)	Indigenous All Stars	def. by	West Coast	Medibank Stadium (crowd: 10,000)	Report
1.2 (8); 5.6 (36); 5.9 (39); 5.11 (41)	Q1; Q2; Q3; Final	3.2 (20); 4.2 (26); 5.5 (35); 7.7 (49)	Polly Farmer Medal: Shaun Burgoyne
Edwards, Jetta, Yarran, Pickett, B.Hill	Goals	McGovern, Sheppard, Wellingham, Gaff, Cripps, Powell, Lamb
Burgoyne, Harbrow, Martin, B.Hill, S.Hill	Best	Wellingham, Masten, Gaff, Schofield, Sinclair, Cripps
Nil	Injuries	Nil
Nil	Reports	Nil

=== NAB Challenge ===
The pre-season series of matches, known as the 2015 NAB Challenge, featured 27 practice matches played over 25 days, beginning 26 February and ending 22 March. The matches were stand-alone in nature, with no overall winner crowned for the series. Each team played three pre-season games, many of which were played at suburban or regional venues, with most games televised on Fox Footy. The nine-point super goal was used in these matches.

	Week 1
Thursday, 26 February 7:10 pm	Hawthorn 2.8.6 (72)	def. by	Collingwood 0.17.14 (116)	Aurora Stadium (crowd: 15,422)	Report
Friday, 27 February 4:10 pm	West Coast 1.9.15 (78)	def.	Carlton 2.4.5 (47)	Rushton Park (crowd: 10,000)	Report
Saturday, 28 February 3:10 pm	Brisbane Lions 0.7.16 (58)	def.	St Kilda 0.8.7 (55)	Moreton Bay Central Sports Complex (crowd: 6,200)	Report
Saturday, 28 February 4:40 pm	Western Bulldogs 0.12.17 (89)	def.	Richmond 1.9.4 (67)	Whitten Oval (crowd: 9,513)	Report
Sunday, 1 March 4:10 pm	Adelaide 1.12.9 (90)	def.	North Melbourne 0.11.14 (80)	Centenary Oval (crowd: 6,000)	Report
Sunday, 1 March 3:40 pm	Gold Coast 0.10.19 (79)	def.	Geelong 1.9.8 (71)	Tony Ireland Stadium (crowd: 4,431)	Report

	Week 2
Thursday, 5 March 4:10 pm	Fremantle 0.9.7 (61)	def.	Melbourne 0.6.7 (43)	Fremantle Oval (crowd: 8,000)	Report
Friday, 6 March 7:10 pm	Sydney 1.4.6 (39)	def. by	Brisbane Lions 0.10.15 (75)	Coffs Harbour International Stadium (crowd: 4,077)	Report
Saturday, 7 March 4:10 pm	Greater Western Sydney 0.14.10 (94)	def.	Gold Coast 2.6.4 (58)	Blacktown International Sportspark (crowd: 1,787)	Report
Saturday, 7 March 4:10 pm	Essendon 0.8.3 (51)	def. by	St Kilda 0.15.11 (101)	Morwell Recreation Reserve (crowd: 5,542)	Report
Sunday, 8 March 4:10 pm	Port Adelaide 1.11.14 (89)	def.	West Coast 0.7.7 (49)	Norwood Oval (crowd: 9,212)	Report
Sunday, 8 March 4:10 pm	North Melbourne 2.9.13 (85)	def.	Hawthorn 1.9.9 (72)	Deakin Reserve (crowd: 7,591)	Report

	Week 3
Thursday, 12 March 7:10 pm	Geelong 1.12.6 (87)	def.	Adelaide 0.9.14 (68)	Simonds Stadium (crowd: 8,019)	Report
Friday, 13 March 7:10 pm	Greater Western Sydney 0.14.13 (97)	def.	Essendon 0.8.4 (52)	Spotless Stadium (crowd: 2,505)	Report
Saturday, 14 March 4:10 pm	Western Bulldogs 0.9.8 (62)	def. by	Melbourne 0.10.9 (69)	Eureka Stadium (crowd: 6,000)	Report
Saturday, 14 March 4:40 pm	Richmond 1.14.10 (103)	def.	Port Adelaide 0.5.7 (37)	Lavington Sports Ground (crowd: 8,451)	Report
Sunday, 15 March 4:10 pm	Sydney 1.7.14 (65)	def.	Fremantle 1.6.11 (56)	Drummoyne Oval (crowd: 4,343)	Report
Sunday, 15 March 4:40 pm	Collingwood 1.7.13 (64)	def. by	Carlton 1.9.8 (71)	Queen Elizabeth Oval (crowd: 9,542)	Report

	Week 4
Thursday, 19 March 7:10 pm	St Kilda 1.4.6 (30)	def. by	Hawthorn 0.22.13 (145)	Etihad Stadium (crowd: 7,077)	Report
Friday, 20 March 5:50 pm	Melbourne 0.11.9 (75)	def. by	Essendon 0.11.11 (77)	Etihad Stadium (crowd: 7,558)	Report
Friday, 20 March 7:40 pm	Gold Coast 0.8.15 (63)	drew with	Brisbane Lions 1.7.12 (63)	Metricon Stadium (crowd: 5,581)	Report
Saturday, 21 March 1:10 pm	Richmond 2.12.16 (106)	def. by	North Melbourne 3.13.15 (120)	Etihad Stadium (crowd: 9,327)	Report
Saturday, 21 March 3:40 pm	Port Adelaide 0.13.15 (93)	def. by	Adelaide 3.13.12 (117)	AAMI Stadium (crowd: 13,971)	Report
Saturday, 21 March 7:10 pm	Western Bulldogs 0.18.7 (115)	def.	Collingwood 0.8.6 (54)	Etihad Stadium (crowd: 10,457)	Report
Sunday, 22 March 1:10 pm	Greater Western Sydney 0.9.13 (67)	def. by	Sydney 0.11.7 (73)	StarTrack Oval (crowd: 7,222)	Report
Sunday, 22 March 4:10 pm	Carlton 2.10.14 (92)	def. by	Geelong 0.17.9 (111)	Etihad Stadium (crowd: 10,361)	Report
Sunday, 22 March 4:10 pm	West Coast 1.11.10 (85)	def. by	Fremantle 1.13.17 (104)	Patersons Stadium (crowd: 16,032)	Report

== Premiership season ==
Notable features of the draw include:

- To address poor attendances and late-finishing matches, all Saturday night matches on the east coast were brought forward by 20 minutes, with matches in this timeslot now starting at 7:20 pm and Saturday twilight matches were brought forward by five minutes to start at 4:35 pm. Matches in Adelaide and Perth retained their respective local starting times of 7:10 pm and 5:40 pm.
- Many of the grounds used by the AFL hosted games in the 2015 Cricket World Cup, which ended on 29 March. Consequently, the season started and finished slightly later than in previous years, with the Grand Final scheduled for the first Saturday in October instead of the customary last Saturday in September.
- Due to the Sydney Royal Easter Show, Greater Western Sydney's primary home ground (Spotless Stadium) was unavailable until round 6, therefore the club's first two home games were at its secondary home ground, StarTrack Oval, in rounds 2 and 4.
- Mother's Day Round (Round 6) saw six matches played on Saturday instead of the usual five, with only two matches played on Mother's Day itself. This was repeated in round 23, with no twilight game on the Sunday.
- The Friday before the Grand Final became a public holiday in Victoria, following an election promise by the incoming state government, under the premiership of Daniel Andrews.
- All starting times are local.

=== Round 1 ===
	Round 1 (Opening Round)
Thursday, 2 April (7:20 pm)	Carlton 11.12 (78)	def. by	Richmond 15.15 (105)	MCG (crowd: 83,493)	Report
Saturday, 4 April (1:40 pm)	Melbourne 17.13 (115)	def.	Gold Coast 13.11 (89)	MCG (crowd: 27,013)	Report
Saturday, 4 April (4:35 pm)	Sydney 10.12 (72)	def.	Essendon 9.6 (60)	ANZ Stadium (crowd: 23,274)	Report
Saturday, 4 April (6:20 pm)	Brisbane Lions 11.8 (74)	def. by	Collingwood 12.14 (86)	Gabba (crowd: 31,240)	Report
Saturday, 4 April (7:20 pm)	Western Bulldogs 14.13 (97)	def.	West Coast 14.3 (87)	Etihad Stadium (crowd: 22,366)	Report
Sunday, 5 April (1:10 pm)	St Kilda 11.12 (78)	def. by	Greater Western Sydney 12.15 (87)	Etihad Stadium (crowd: 18,794)	Report
Sunday, 5 April (2:50 pm)	Adelaide 21.14 (140)	def.	North Melbourne 9.9 (63)	Adelaide Oval (crowd: 45,607)	Report
Sunday, 5 April (4:40 pm)	Fremantle 11.9 (75)	def.	Port Adelaide 10.8 (68)	Domain Stadium (crowd: 34,099)	Report
Monday, 6 April (3:20 pm)	Hawthorn 17.21 (123)	def.	Geelong 8.13 (61)	MCG (crowd: 73,584)	Report
Melbourne's win against Gold Coast was the first time since 2005 it had won its round 1 game.; Sydney trailed Essendon by 41 points during time on in the third quarter, before Sydney scored the last eight goals of the game to come from behind to record a twelve-point win. Sydney's three-quarter time deficit of 34 points was the largest it had ever overcome to win in the club's history.

=== Round 2 ===
	Round 2
Friday, 10 April (6:10 pm)	West Coast 20.11 (131)	def.	Carlton 9.8 (62)	Domain Stadium (crowd: 34,588)	Report
Saturday, 11 April (1:45 pm)	Richmond 9.12 (66)	def. by	Western Bulldogs 12.13 (85)	MCG (crowd: 49,945)	Report
Saturday, 11 April (2:10 pm)	Greater Western Sydney 15.11 (101)	def.	Melbourne 8.8 (56)	StarTrack Oval (crowd: 8,811)	Report
Saturday, 11 April (4:35 pm)	Collingwood 9.9 (63)	def. by	Adelaide 12.18 (90)	Etihad Stadium (crowd: 33,771)	Report
Saturday, 11 April (7:20 pm)	Gold Coast 10.16 (76)	def. by	St Kilda 16.8 (104)	Metricon Stadium (crowd: 13,649)	Report
Saturday, 11 April (7:10 pm)	Port Adelaide 6.8 (44)	def. by	Sydney 14.8 (92)	Adelaide Oval (crowd: 48,907)	Report
Sunday, 12 April (1:10 pm)	Geelong 9.6 (60)	def. by	Fremantle 15.14 (104)	Simonds Stadium (crowd: 23,723)	Report
Sunday, 12 April (3:20 pm)	Essendon 12.6 (78)	def.	Hawthorn 11.10 (76)	MCG (crowd: 59,866)	Report
Sunday, 12 April (4:40 pm)	North Melbourne 20.13 (133)	def.	Brisbane Lions 7.9 (51)	Etihad Stadium (crowd: 22,275)	Report
Josh Kennedy (West Coast) kicked 10 goals against Carlton, becoming the first player to kick 10 goals on three or more occasions in his career since Matthew Lloyd (Essendon), who completed the feat in 2003.

=== Round 3 ===
	Round 3
Friday, 17 April (7:50 pm)	Collingwood 21.14 (140)	def.	St Kilda 10.6 (66)	MCG (crowd: 45,197)	Report
Saturday, 18 April (1:45 pm)	Carlton 11.18 (84)	def. by	Essendon 16.9 (105)	MCG (crowd: 54,854)	Report
Saturday, 18 April (1:40 pm)	Adelaide 12.8 (80)	def.	Melbourne 7.13 (55)	Adelaide Oval (crowd: 42,834)	Report
Saturday, 18 April (4:35 pm)	Sydney 16.15 (111)	def.	Greater Western Sydney 12.18 (90)	SCG (crowd: 31,966)	Report
Saturday, 18 April (7:20 pm)	North Melbourne 16.9 (105)	def. by	Port Adelaide 17.11 (113)	Etihad Stadium (crowd: 22,586)	Report
Saturday, 18 April (7:20 pm)	Brisbane Lions 8.10 (58)	def. by	Richmond 21.11 (137)	Gabba (crowd: 22,441)	Report
Sunday, 19 April (1:10 pm)	Hawthorn 19.13 (127)	def.	Western Bulldogs 8.9 (57)	Aurora Stadium (crowd: 15,559)	Report
Sunday, 19 April (3:20 pm)	Geelong 16.9 (105)	def.	Gold Coast 13.18 (96)	Simonds Stadium (crowd: 20,813)	Report
Sunday, 19 April (2:40 pm)	West Coast 12.9 (81)	def. by	Fremantle 17.9 (111)	Domain Stadium (crowd: 39,138)	Report

=== Round 4 ===
	Round 4 (ANZAC Round)
Friday, 24 April (7:50 pm)	Richmond 6.15 (51)	def. by	Melbourne 12.11 (83)	MCG (crowd: 58,175)	Report
Saturday, 25 April (1:10 pm)	St Kilda 12.9 (81)	def. by	Carlton 18.13 (121)	Westpac Stadium (crowd: 12,125)	Report
Saturday, 25 April (2:40 pm)	Essendon 6.13 (49)	def. by	Collingwood 9.15 (69)	MCG (crowd: 88,395)	Report
Saturday, 25 April (5:40 pm)	Greater Western Sydney 16.23 (119)	def.	Gold Coast 7.11 (53)	StarTrack Oval (crowd: 6,917)	Report
Saturday, 25 April (7:10 pm)	Port Adelaide 15.9 (99)	def.	Hawthorn 13.13 (91)	Adelaide Oval (crowd: 49,831)	Report
Saturday, 25 April (6:45 pm)	Fremantle 11.8 (74)	def.	Sydney 8.12 (60)	Domain Stadium (crowd: 39,009)	Report
Sunday, 26 April (1:10 pm)	Brisbane Lions 9.11 (65)	def. by	West Coast 17.16 (118)	Gabba (crowd: 16,632)	Report
Sunday, 26 April (3:20 pm)	Geelong 9.13 (67)	def. by	North Melbourne 12.11 (83)	Simonds Stadium (crowd: 23,452)	Report
Sunday, 26 April (4:40 pm)	Western Bulldogs 18.17 (125)	def.	Adelaide 10.8 (68)	Etihad Stadium (crowd: 19,915)	Report

=== Round 5 ===
	Round 5
Friday, 1 May (7:50 pm)	Carlton 6.9 (45)	def. by	Collingwood 18.12 (120)	MCG (crowd: 71,759)	Report
Saturday, 2 May (1:45 pm)	Richmond 11.10 (76)	def. by	Geelong 12.13 (85)	MCG (crowd: 45,228)	Report
Saturday, 2 May (2:10 pm)	Sydney 10.13 (73)	def. by	Western Bulldogs 11.11 (77)	SCG (crowd: 25,541)	Report
Saturday, 2 May (4:35 pm)	Gold Coast 18.10 (118)	def.	Brisbane Lions 7.12 (54)	Metricon Stadium (crowd: 12,464)	Report
Saturday, 2 May (7:20 pm)	North Melbourne 10.10 (70)	def. by	Hawthorn 19.16 (130)	Etihad Stadium (crowd: 38,077)	Report
Saturday, 2 May (5:40 pm)	West Coast 18.12 (120)	def.	Greater Western Sydney 4.9 (33)	Domain Stadium (crowd: 34,554)	Report
Sunday, 3 May (1:10 pm)	Melbourne 6.14 (50)	def. by	Fremantle 18.10 (118)	MCG (crowd: 22,892)	Report
Sunday, 3 May (3:20 pm)	St Kilda 11.14 (80)	def. by	Essendon 11.16 (82)	Etihad Stadium (crowd: 29,869)	Report
Sunday, 3 May (4:10 pm)	Adelaide 13.13 (91)	def. by	Port Adelaide 18.7 (115)	Adelaide Oval (crowd: 49,617)	Report
Mick Malthouse (Carlton) coached his 715th senior VFL/AFL game, surpassing Jock McHale's record of 714 games to become the longest-serving coach in VFL/AFL history.

=== Round 6 ===
	Round 6
Friday, 8 May (7:50 pm)	Collingwood 8.11 (59)	def. by	Geelong 15.10 (100)	MCG (crowd: 52,152)	Report
Saturday, 9 May (1:45 pm)	North Melbourne 16.13 (109)	def.	Richmond 10.14 (74)	Blundstone Arena (crowd: 17,544)	Report
Saturday, 9 May (2:10 pm)	Western Bulldogs 13.9 (87)	def. by	St Kilda 14.10 (94)	Etihad Stadium (crowd: 29,619)	Report
Saturday, 9 May (4:35 pm)	Greater Western Sydney 16.12 (108)	def.	Hawthorn 14.14 (98)	Spotless Stadium (crowd: 13,556)	Report
Saturday, 9 May (5:10 pm)	Gold Coast 11.12 (78)	def. by	Adelaide 18.11 (119)	Metricon Stadium (crowd: 12,464)	Report
Saturday, 9 May (7:20 pm)	Melbourne 7.8 (50)	def. by	Sydney 12.16 (88)	MCG (crowd: 26,894)	Report
Saturday, 9 May (6:10 pm)	Fremantle 12.8 (80)	def.	Essendon 7.10 (52)	Domain Stadium (crowd: 37,535)	Report
Sunday, 10 May (3:20 pm)	Carlton 11.9 (75)	def. by	Brisbane Lions 12.12 (84)	Etihad Stadium (crowd: 20,273)	Report
Sunday, 10 May (4:10 pm)	Port Adelaide 10.8 (68)	def. by	West Coast 11.12 (78)	Adelaide Oval (crowd: 37,635)	Report
St Kilda defeated Western Bulldogs after trailing by 55 points early in the third quarter. It was the equal-fifth largest successful comeback in VFL/AFL history and equalled the club's greatest ever comeback.

=== Round 7 ===
	Round 7
Friday, 15 May (7:50 pm)	Essendon 12.10 (82)	def. by	North Melbourne 13.15 (93)	Etihad Stadium (crowd: 43,972)	Report
Saturday, 16 May (1:15 pm)	Adelaide 18.11 (119)	def.	St Kilda 10.13 (73)	Adelaide Oval (crowd: 42,795)	Report
Saturday, 16 May (2:10 pm)	Hawthorn 24.11 (155)	def.	Melbourne 7.8 (50)	MCG (crowd: 41,935)	Report
Saturday, 16 May (4:35 pm)	Carlton 9.3 (57)	def. by	Greater Western Sydney 19.21 (135)	Etihad Stadium (crowd: 16,676)	Report
Saturday, 16 May (7:20 pm)	Sydney 18.12 (120)	def.	Geelong 11.11 (77)	ANZ Stadium (crowd: 28,063)	Report
Saturday, 16 May (5:40 pm)	West Coast 21.9 (135)	def.	Gold Coast 6.7 (43)	Domain Stadium (crowd: 26,964)	Report
Sunday, 17 May (1:10 pm)	Western Bulldogs 14.4 (88)	def. by	Fremantle 15.11 (101)	Etihad Stadium (crowd: 18,170)	Report
Sunday, 17 May (3:20 pm)	Richmond 16.9 (105)	def.	Collingwood 15.10 (100)	MCG (crowd: 59,034)	Report
Sunday, 17 May (4:40 pm)	Brisbane Lions 15.12 (102)	def.	Port Adelaide 8.17 (65)	Gabba (crowd: 15,957)	Report
West Coast kicked 12.0 (72) in the third quarter against Gold Coast, the highest score in a single quarter in the club's history.

=== Round 8 ===
	Round 8
Friday, 22 May (7:50 pm)	Geelong 22.8 (140)	def.	Carlton 9.9 (63)	Etihad Stadium (crowd: 32,032)	Report
Saturday, 23 May (1:45 pm)	St Kilda 12.6 (78)	def. by	West Coast 20.11 (131)	Etihad Stadium (crowd: 23,598)	Report
Saturday, 23 May (2:10 pm)	Greater Western Sydney 16.12 (108)	def.	Adelaide 12.12 (84)	Spotless Stadium (crowd: 9,481)	Report
Saturday, 23 May (4:35 pm)	Gold Coast 9.9 (63)	def. by	Collingwood 20.12 (132)	Metricon Stadium (crowd: 16,440)	Report
Saturday, 23 May (7:20 pm)	Hawthorn 9.15 (69)	def. by	Sydney 11.7 (73)	MCG (crowd: 63,319)	Report
Saturday, 23 May (5:40 pm)	Fremantle 17.13 (115)	def.	North Melbourne 5.12 (42)	Domain Stadium (crowd: 35,836)	Report
Sunday, 24 May (1:10 pm)	Essendon 21.10 (136)	def.	Brisbane Lions 12.6 (78)	Etihad Stadium (crowd: 36,857)	Report
Sunday, 24 May (3:20 pm)	Melbourne 15.13 (103)	def.	Western Bulldogs 9.10 (64)	MCG (crowd: 29,381)	Report
Sunday, 24 May (4:10 pm)	Port Adelaide 5.13 (43)	def. by	Richmond 11.10 (76)	Adelaide Oval (crowd: 44,451)	Report

=== Round 9 ===
	Round 9 (Indigenous Round)
Friday, 29 May (7:50 pm)	Sydney 19.8 (122)	def.	Carlton 9.8 (62)	SCG (crowd: 32,105)	Report
Saturday, 30 May (1:45 pm)	Hawthorn 14.9 (93)	def.	Gold Coast 6.4 (40)	Aurora Stadium (crowd: 11,320)	Report
Saturday, 30 May (1:40 pm)	Melbourne 8.6 (54)	def. by	Port Adelaide 18.7 (115)	TIO Traeger Park (crowd: 4,866)	Report
Saturday, 30 May (4:35 pm)	Western Bulldogs 16.17 (113)	def.	Greater Western Sydney 11.2 (68)	Etihad Stadium (crowd: 16,395)	Report
Saturday, 30 May (7:25 pm)	Richmond 10.12 (72)	def.	Essendon 8.11 (59)	MCG (crowd: 83,804)	Report
Saturday, 30 May (7:10 pm)	Adelaide 7.15 (57)	def. by	Fremantle 10.8 (68)	Adelaide Oval (crowd: 45,009)	Report
Sunday, 31 May (1:10 pm)	Brisbane Lions 13.8 (86)	def. by	St Kilda 16.12 (108)	Gabba (crowd: 16,898)	Report
Sunday, 31 May (3:20 pm)	Collingwood 17.10 (112)	def.	North Melbourne 14.11 (95)	MCG (crowd: 43,452)	Report
Sunday, 31 May (2:40 pm)	West Coast 16.24 (120)	def.	Geelong 10.4 (64)	Domain Stadium (crowd: 37,676)	Report
Dustin Fletcher of Essendon became the third player in VFL/AFL history to play 400 games.; Aaron Sandilands (Fremantle) recorded 69 hit-outs against Adelaide, the highest amount since game statistics were documented from 1965; this broke the previous record of 63 set in 1982 by Gary Dempsey. The new record stood for only two weeks, before Sandilands bettered the tally in round 11.; Fremantle recorded its best ever start to the season, winning its first nine matches; its previous best unbeaten start to a season was three matches in 2010.

=== Round 10 ===
	Round 10
Friday, 5 June (6:10 pm)	Fremantle 10.10 (70)	def. by	Richmond 15.7 (97)	Domain Stadium (crowd: 38,019)	Report
Saturday, 6 June (1:40 pm)	Carlton 14.6 (90)	def. by	Adelaide 14.15 (99)	MCG (crowd: 32,035)	Report
Saturday, 6 June (4:35 pm)	Gold Coast 5.11 (41)	def. by	Sydney 13.15 (93)	Metricon Stadium (crowd: 13,068)	Report
Saturday, 6 June (7:20 pm)	Essendon 7.11 (53)	def. by	Geelong 19.8 (122)	Etihad Stadium (crowd: 40,632)	Report
Saturday, 6 June (7:10 pm)	Port Adelaide 16.4 (100)	def.	Western Bulldogs 9.8 (62)	Adelaide Oval (crowd: 40,907)	Report
Sunday, 7 June (1:10 pm)	Greater Western Sydney 14.13 (97)	def.	Brisbane Lions 10.7 (67)	Spotless Stadium (crowd: 9,079)	Report
Sunday, 7 June (3:20 pm)	North Melbourne 13.7 (85)	def.	West Coast 10.15 (75)	Blundstone Arena (crowd: 12,011)	Report
Sunday, 7 June (4:40 pm)	St Kilda 10.9 (69)	def. by	Hawthorn 20.12 (132)	Etihad Stadium (crowd: 33,886)	Report
Monday, 8 June (3:20 pm)	Melbourne 13.7 (85)	def. by	Collingwood 17.8 (110)	MCG (crowd: 66,120)	Report

=== Round 11 ===
	Round 11
Friday, 12 June (7:20 pm)	Port Adelaide 11.3 (69)	def. by	Geelong 14.8 (92)	Adelaide Oval (crowd: 46,140)	Report
Saturday, 13 June (1:40 pm)	Gold Coast 7.4 (46)	def. by	Fremantle 6.17 (53)	Metricon Stadium (crowd: 8,911)	Report
Saturday, 13 June (2:35 pm)	West Coast 14.12 (96)	def.	Essendon 6.10 (46)	Domain Stadium (crowd: 37,306)	Report
Saturday, 13 June (7:20 pm)	North Melbourne 10.15 (75)	def. by	Sydney 14.7 (91)	Etihad Stadium (crowd: 32,127)	Report
Sunday, 14 June (1:10 pm)	Collingwood 18.11 (119)	def.	Greater Western Sydney 11.11 (77)	MCG (crowd: 43,390)	Report
Sunday, 14 June (4:40 pm)	St Kilda 12.13 (85)	def.	Melbourne 12.11 (83)	Etihad Stadium (crowd: 25,187)	Report
	Bye; Adelaide, Brisbane Lions, Carlton, Hawthorn, Richmond, Western Bulldogs
Aaron Sandilands of Fremantle recorded 70 hit-outs against Gold Coast, the highest amount since game statistics were documented from 1965; this broke the previous record of 69 which Sandilands had set only two weeks earlier. However, this was later broken when Todd Goldstein recorded 80 hitouts in round 12.

=== Round 12 ===
	Round 12
Thursday, 18 June (7:20 pm)	Adelaide 12.13 (85)	def. by	Hawthorn 17.12 (114)	Adelaide Oval (crowd: 49,108)	Report
Friday, 19 June (7:50 pm)	Richmond 10.10 (70)	def. by	West Coast 13.12 (90)	MCG (crowd: 45,178)	Report
Saturday, 20 June (1:40 pm)	Carlton 17.8 (110)	def.	Port Adelaide 16.10 (106)	MCG (crowd: 27,693)	Report
Saturday, 20 June (4:35 pm)	Greater Western Sydney 8.13 (61)	def. by	North Melbourne 18.9 (117)	Spotless Stadium (crowd: 7,824)	Report
Saturday, 20 June (7:20 pm)	Western Bulldogs 22.14 (146)	def.	Brisbane Lions 11.8 (74)	Etihad Stadium (crowd: 21,129)	Report
Sunday, 21 June (3:20 pm)	Geelong 13.11 (89)	def. by	Melbourne 18.5 (113)	Simonds Stadium (crowd: 28,007)	Report
	Bye; Collingwood, Essendon, Fremantle, Gold Coast, St Kilda, Sydney
Todd Goldstein of North Melbourne recorded 80 hit-outs against Greater Western Sydney, the highest amount since game statistics were documented from 1965; this broke the previous record of 70, which Aaron Sandilands had set only one week earlier.; Melbourne ended a ten-game losing streak against Geelong.

=== Round 13 ===
	Round 13
Thursday, 25 June (6:10 pm)	Fremantle 12.8 (80)	def.	Collingwood 11.7 (73)	Domain Stadium (crowd: 37,145)	Report
Friday, 26 June (7:50 pm)	Sydney 11.11 (77)	def. by	Richmond 14.11 (95)	SCG (crowd: 37,579)	Report
Saturday, 27 June (1:40 pm)	Hawthorn 16.18 (114)	def.	Essendon 11.10 (76)	MCG (crowd: 62,500)	Report
Saturday, 27 June (4:35 pm)	Brisbane Lions 10.9 (69)	def. by	Adelaide 11.16 (82)	Gabba (crowd: 18,146)	Report
Saturday, 27 June (7:20 pm)	St Kilda 7.14 (56)	def. by	Western Bulldogs 9.8 (62)	Etihad Stadium (crowd: 26,511)	Report
Sunday, 28 June (3:20 pm)	Carlton 14.19 (103)	def.	Gold Coast 9.15 (69)	Etihad Stadium (crowd: 30,207)	Report
	Bye; Geelong, Greater Western Sydney, Melbourne, North Melbourne, Port Adelaide, West Coast

=== Round 14 ===
	Round 14
Thursday, 2 July (7:20 pm)	Sydney 14.10 (94)	def.	Port Adelaide 12.12 (84)	SCG (crowd: 28,316)	Report
Friday, 3 July (7:50 pm)	Collingwood 12.19 (91)	def. by	Hawthorn 15.11 (101)	MCG (crowd: 75,880)	Report
Saturday, 4 July (1:40 pm)	Richmond 10.18 (78)	def.	Greater Western Sydney 10.9 (69)	MCG (crowd: 35,968)	Report
Saturday, 4 July (4:40 pm)	Gold Coast 19.11 (125)	def.	North Melbourne 10.10 (70)	Metricon Stadium (crowd: 14,444)	Report
Saturday, 4 July (7:30 pm)	Western Bulldogs 9.10 (64)	def.	Carlton 7.11 (53)	Etihad Stadium (crowd: 31,445)	Report
Saturday, 4 July (7:10 pm)	Melbourne 9.6 (60)	def. by	West Coast 16.18 (114)	TIO Stadium (crowd: 11,873)	Report
Sunday, 5 July (1:10 pm)	Essendon 8.4 (52)	def. by	St Kilda 25.12 (162)	Etihad Stadium (crowd: 38,020)	Report
Sunday, 5 July (2:40 pm)	Fremantle 13.6 (84)	def.	Brisbane Lions 7.6 (48)	Domain Stadium (crowd: 32,970)	Report
Sunday, 5 July (cancelled)	Adelaide	v	Geelong	Adelaide Oval
The match between Adelaide and Geelong was cancelled following the death of Adelaide coach Phil Walsh on 3 July, with each team receiving two premiership points. It was the first premiership match to be cancelled outright, rather than rescheduled or postponed, in VFL/AFL history. Starting times of some other matches were adjusted slightly to accommodate tributes to Walsh.; St Kilda recorded its highest ever score (162 points) and winning margin (110 points) against Essendon.

=== Round 15 ===
	Round 15
Thursday, 9 July (7:20 pm)	Port Adelaide 9.12 (66)	def.	Collingwood 9.9 (63)	Adelaide Oval (crowd: 44,496)	Report
Friday, 10 July (7:50 pm)	Richmond 10.11 (71)	def.	Carlton 5.11 (41)	MCG (crowd: 52,564)	Report
Saturday, 11 July (1:40 pm)	Essendon 10.9 (69)	def.	Melbourne 7.18 (60)	MCG (crowd: 38,861)	Report
Saturday, 11 July (4:35 pm)	Western Bulldogs 14.11 (95)	def.	Gold Coast 11.7 (73)	Cazaly's Stadium (crowd: 9,449)	Report
Saturday, 11 July (7:20 pm)	North Melbourne 18.12 (120)	def.	Geelong 11.13 (79)	Etihad Stadium (crowd: 31,270)	Report
Saturday, 11 July (5:40 pm)	West Coast 22.15 (147)	def.	Adelaide 14.7 (91)	Domain Stadium (crowd: 38,133)	Report
Sunday, 12 July (1:10 pm)	Greater Western Sydney 12.12 (84)	def.	St Kilda 6.13 (49)	Spotless Stadium (crowd: 9,178)	Report
Sunday, 12 July (3:20 pm)	Hawthorn 17.13 (115)	def.	Fremantle 6.7 (43)	Aurora Stadium (crowd: 16,792)	Report
Sunday, 12 July (4:40 pm)	Brisbane Lions 7.7 (49)	def. by	Sydney 10.10 (70)	Gabba (crowd: 16,936)	Report

=== Round 16 ===
	Round 16
Friday, 17 July (7:50 pm)	North Melbourne 14.9 (93)	def.	Essendon 9.14 (68)	Etihad Stadium (crowd: 31,025)	Report
Saturday, 18 July (1:45 pm)	Geelong 10.12 (72)	def.	Western Bulldogs 9.10 (64)	Simonds Stadium (crowd: 25,041)	Report
Saturday, 18 July (2:10 pm)	Gold Coast 12.7 (79)	def. by	Greater Western Sydney 13.16 (94)	Metricon Stadium (crowd: 9,589)	Report
Saturday, 18 July (4:35 pm)	Collingwood 7.14 (56)	def. by	West Coast 11.21 (87)	Etihad Stadium (crowd: 36,527)	Report
Saturday, 18 July (7:20 pm)	Sydney 7.15 (57)	def. by	Hawthorn 23.8 (146)	ANZ Stadium (crowd: 37,369)	Report
Saturday, 18 July (5:40 pm)	Fremantle 13.17 (95)	def.	Carlton 8.5 (53)	Domain Stadium (crowd: 33,581)	Report
Sunday, 19 July (1:10 pm)	Melbourne 8.12 (60)	def.	Brisbane Lions 4.12 (36)	MCG (crowd: 25,149)	Report
Sunday, 19 July (2:50 pm)	Port Adelaide 17.11 (113)	def. by	Adelaide 18.8 (116)	Adelaide Oval (crowd: 53,518)	Report
Sunday, 19 July (4:40 pm)	St Kilda 10.13 (73)	def. by	Richmond 13.11 (89)	Etihad Stadium (crowd: 45,772)	Report
The Sydney Swans' 89-point loss to Hawthorn was their heaviest defeat in a premiership match since round 10, 1998.

=== Round 17 ===
	Round 17
Friday, 24 July (7:50 pm)	Carlton 4.11 (35)	def. by	Hawthorn 27.11 (173)	Etihad Stadium (crowd: 26,815)	Report
Saturday, 25 July (1:45 pm)	Greater Western Sydney 6.6 (42)	def. by	Geelong 9.15 (69)	StarTrack Oval (crowd: 14,667)	Report
Saturday, 25 July (1:40 pm)	Adelaide 19.11 (125)	def.	Gold Coast 12.8 (80)	Adelaide Oval (crowd: 41,715)	Report
Saturday, 25 July (4:35 pm)	Richmond 10.18 (78)	def. by	Fremantle 12.10 (82)	MCG (crowd: 39,777)	Report
Saturday, 25 July (7:20 pm)	Essendon 17.14 (116)	def. by	Port Adelaide 20.9 (129)	Etihad Stadium (crowd: 23,705)	Report
Saturday, 25 July (7:20 pm)	Brisbane Lions 5.8 (38)	def. by	North Melbourne 16.14 (110)	Gabba (crowd: 15,563)	Report
Sunday, 26 July (1:10 pm)	Western Bulldogs 15.14 (104)	def.	Collingwood 13.8 (86)	Etihad Stadium (crowd: 40,581)	Report
Sunday, 26 July (3:20 pm)	Melbourne 6.10 (46)	def. by	St Kilda 12.11 (83)	MCG (crowd: 22,945)	Report
Sunday, 26 July (2:40 pm)	West Coast 15.13 (103)	def.	Sydney 7.9 (51)	Domain Stadium (crowd: 38,760)	Report
Carlton's 138-point loss against Hawthorn set a new record as the club's heaviest ever defeat in a premiership match, in addition, their score of 4.11 (35) was their lowest score against Hawthorn in history.; Brent Harvey of North Melbourne became the fourth player in VFL/AFL history to play 400 games.

=== Round 18 ===
	Round 18
Friday, 31 July (7:50 pm)	Hawthorn 7.11 (53)	def. by	Richmond 10.11 (71)	MCG (crowd: 66,305)	Report
Saturday, 1 August (1:45 pm)	Geelong 17.11 (113)	def.	Brisbane Lions 8.9 (57)	Simonds Stadium (crowd: 21,914)	Report
Saturday, 1 August (2:10 pm)	Collingwood 7.12 (54)	def. by	Melbourne 13.13 (91)	MCG (crowd: 37,894)	Report
Saturday, 1 August (4:35 pm)	Sydney 17.15 (117)	def.	Adelaide 9.11 (65)	SCG (crowd: 38,690)	Report
Saturday, 1 August (7:20 pm)	Carlton 8.6 (54)	def. by	North Melbourne 18.10 (118)	Etihad Stadium (crowd: 25,251)	Report
Saturday, 1 August (7:20 pm)	Gold Coast 12.11 (83)	drew with	West Coast 11.17 (83)	Metricon Stadium (crowd: 9,341)	Report
Sunday, 2 August (12:40 pm)	Port Adelaide 17.10 (112)	def.	St Kilda 6.13 (49)	Adelaide Oval (crowd: 35,977)	Report
Sunday, 2 August (3:20 pm)	Essendon 5.10 (40)	def. by	Western Bulldogs 19.13 (127)	Etihad Stadium (crowd: 33,466)	Report
Sunday, 2 August (2:40 pm)	Fremantle 12.12 (84)	def.	Greater Western Sydney 9.9 (63)	Domain Stadium (crowd: 34,626)	Report
Melbourne defeated Collingwood for the first time since round 11, 2007, ending an eleven-game winless streak.

=== Round 19 ===
	Round 19 (Multicultural Round)
Friday, 7 August (7:20 pm)	Adelaide 11.22 (88)	def.	Richmond 8.4 (52)	Adelaide Oval (crowd: 49,116)	Report
Saturday, 8 August (1:45 pm)	Collingwood 16.9 (105)	def.	Carlton 13.9 (87)	MCG (crowd: 48,133)	Report
Saturday, 8 August (2:10 pm)	Western Bulldogs 19.14 (128)	def.	Port Adelaide 9.10 (64)	Etihad Stadium (crowd: 20,590)	Report
Saturday, 8 August (4:35 pm)	Brisbane Lions 14.16 (100)	def. by	Gold Coast 17.12 (114)	Gabba (crowd: 20,025)	Report
Saturday, 8 August (7:20 pm)	Geelong 14.11 (95)	def.	Sydney 9.9 (63)	Simonds Stadium (crowd: 27,901)	Report
Saturday, 8 August (5:40 pm)	West Coast 11.8 (74)	def. by	Hawthorn 13.10 (88)	Domain Stadium (crowd: 34,843)	Report
Sunday, 9 August (1:10 pm)	Melbourne 14.8 (92)	def. by	North Melbourne 19.13 (127)	MCG (crowd: 30,695)	Report
Sunday, 9 August (3:20 pm)	Greater Western Sydney 14.9 (93)	def.	Essendon 8.13 (61)	Spotless Stadium (crowd: 10,093)	Report
Sunday, 9 August (4:40 pm)	St Kilda 8.11 (59)	def. by	Fremantle 15.6 (96)	Etihad Stadium (crowd: 16,419)	Report
The Brisbane Lions–Gold Coast match featured a one-off trial of officiating a match with four field umpires instead of three. The four umpire system had previously been trialled in the pre-season, but this was the first premiership match to be officiated by four umpires.

=== Round 20 ===
	Round 20
Friday, 14 August (7:50 pm)	Sydney 13.9 (87)	def.	Collingwood 10.16 (76)	SCG (crowd: 38,408)	Report
Saturday, 15 August (1:45 pm)	Essendon 8.11 (59)	def. by	Adelaide 27.9 (171)	Etihad Stadium (crowd: 25,914)	Report
Saturday, 15 August (2:10 pm)	North Melbourne 18.12 (120)	def.	St Kilda 11.17 (83)	Blundstone Arena (crowd: 14,346)	Report
Saturday, 15 August (4:05 pm)	Port Adelaide 16.15 (111)	def.	Greater Western Sydney 13.12 (90)	Adelaide Oval (crowd: 32,436)	Report
Saturday, 15 August (7:20 pm)	Geelong 12.13 (85)	def. by	Hawthorn 19.7 (121)	MCG (crowd: 55,802)	Report
Saturday, 15 August (7:20 pm)	Brisbane Lions 20.11 (131)	def.	Carlton 9.13 (67)	Gabba (crowd: 17,744)	Report
Sunday, 16 August (1:10 pm)	Richmond 22.6 (138)	def.	Gold Coast 8.7 (55)	MCG (crowd: 38,508)	Report
Sunday, 16 August (3:20 pm)	Western Bulldogs 24.9 (153)	def.	Melbourne 8.7 (55)	Etihad Stadium (crowd: 27,805)	Report
Sunday, 16 August (2:40 pm)	Fremantle 11.14 (80)	def. by	West Coast 15.14 (104)	Domain Stadium (crowd: 41,959)	Report

=== Round 21 ===
	Round 21
Friday, 21 August (7:50 pm)	Hawthorn 13.8 (86)	def. by	Port Adelaide 16.12 (108)	Etihad Stadium (crowd: 28,657)	Report
Saturday, 22 August (1:45 pm)	Collingwood 7.14 (56)	def. by	Richmond 23.9 (147)	MCG (crowd: 63,178)	Report
Saturday, 22 August (2:10 pm)	Greater Western Sydney 6.8 (44)	def. by	Sydney 20.13 (133)	Spotless Stadium (crowd: 19,507)	Report
Saturday, 22 August (4:35 pm)	Gold Coast 14.13 (97)	def.	Essendon 14.11 (95)	Metricon Stadium (crowd: 16,253)	Report
Saturday, 22 August (7:20 pm)	St Kilda 14.13 (97)	drew with	Geelong 15.7 (97)	Etihad Stadium (crowd: 25,245)	Report
Saturday, 22 August (7:10 pm)	Adelaide 20.11 (131)	def.	Brisbane Lions 6.8 (44)	Adelaide Oval (crowd: 46,609)	Report
Sunday, 23 August (1:10 pm)	North Melbourne 14.10 (94)	def.	Fremantle 12.11 (83)	Etihad Stadium (crowd: 23,857)	Report
Sunday, 23 August (3:20 pm)	Carlton 12.6 (78)	def.	Melbourne 7.13 (55)	MCG (crowd: 33,962)	Report
Sunday, 23 August (2:40 pm)	West Coast 25.12 (162)	def.	Western Bulldogs 13.7 (85)	Domain Stadium (crowd: 37,733)	Report
Jason Holmes (St Kilda) became the first American-raised person to play an AFL game.

=== Round 22 ===
	Round 22
Friday, 28 August (7:50 pm)	Geelong 9.8 (62)	def. by	Collingwood 17.8 (110)	MCG (crowd: 40,582)	Report
Saturday, 29 August (1:45 pm)	Greater Western Sydney 20.12 (132)	def.	Carlton 7.9 (51)	Spotless Stadium (crowd: 9,538)	Report
Saturday, 29 August (2:10 pm)	Hawthorn 21.8 (134)	def.	Brisbane Lions 9.8 (62)	Aurora Stadium (crowd: 11,731)	Report
Saturday, 29 August (4:35 pm)	North Melbourne 10.13 (73)	def. by	Western Bulldogs 14.12 (96)	Etihad Stadium (crowd: 37,299)	Report
Saturday, 29 August (7:20 pm)	Essendon 7.5 (47)	def. by	Richmond 10.14 (74)	MCG (crowd: 37,864)	Report
Saturday, 29 August (7:20 pm)	Gold Coast 7.9 (51)	def. by	Port Adelaide 12.16 (88)	Metricon Stadium (crowd: 9,343)	Report
Sunday, 30 August (1:10 pm)	Adelaide 19.12 (126)	def.	West Coast 10.9 (69)	Adelaide Oval (crowd: 52,460)	Report
Sunday, 30 August (3:20 pm)	St Kilda 4.14 (38)	def. by	Sydney 20.15 (135)	Etihad Stadium (crowd: 27,856)	Report
Sunday, 30 August (2:40 pm)	Fremantle 17.6 (108)	def.	Melbourne 8.6 (54)	Domain Stadium (crowd: 33,529)	Report

=== Round 23 ===
	Round 23
Friday, 4 September (7:50 pm)	Richmond 16.12 (108)	def.	North Melbourne 10.7 (67)	Etihad Stadium (crowd: 40,461)	Report
Saturday, 5 September (1:05 pm)	Geelong 17.17 (119)	def.	Adelaide 11.14 (80)	Simonds Stadium (crowd: 26,128)	Report
Saturday, 5 September (1:45 pm)	Brisbane Lions 19.16 (130)	def.	Western Bulldogs 19.8 (122)	Gabba (crowd: 15,434)	Report
Saturday, 5 September (3:20 pm)	Port Adelaide 18.14 (122)	def.	Fremantle 8.5 (53)	Adelaide Oval (crowd: 37,922)	Report
Saturday, 5 September (4:40 pm)	Hawthorn 17.11 (113)	def.	Carlton 8.8 (56)	MCG (crowd: 33,182)	Report
Saturday, 5 September (7:25 pm)	Sydney 19.13 (127)	def.	Gold Coast 9.10 (64)	SCG (crowd: 25,424)	Report
Saturday, 5 September (5:40 pm)	West Coast 18.17 (125)	def.	St Kilda 4.6 (30)	Domain Stadium (crowd: 36,165)	Report
Sunday, 6 September (1:10 pm)	Melbourne 15.13 (103)	def.	Greater Western Sydney 11.11 (77)	Etihad Stadium (crowd: 8,974)	Report
Sunday, 6 September (3:20 pm)	Collingwood 14.8 (92)	def. by	Essendon 14.11 (95)	MCG (crowd: 40,270)	Report
Fremantle and North Melbourne both received permission from the AFL under its competitive integrity rules to omit several key senior players in this round to manage their fatigue for the finals: Fremantle's finishing position could not change based on the outcome of its game, and although North Melbourne's position could change, the league ruled that North Melbourne was not attempting to manipulate its finals draw. Fremantle made twelve team changes, equalling the all-time record associated with the St Kilda players' strike of 1911, then broke the record outright with thirteen changes bringing its players back for the qualifying finals; this record stood until 2022. North Melbourne made nine changes.; Melbourne ended a 22-game losing streak at Docklands Stadium dating back to round 19, 2007.; The crowd of 8,974 for the match between Melbourne and Greater Western Sydney is the lowest ever for an attended AFL premiership match at Docklands Stadium.; The crowd of 40,270 for Collingwood vs. Essendon was the lowest between the two clubs since it had become standard to move matches between the clubs away from their smaller suburban grounds and to the Melbourne Cricket Ground or Waverley Park in 1988.

=== Season notes ===
- Fremantle secured the minor premiership for the first time in its history.
- Fremantle and West Coast finished first and second on the ladder respectively, the first time two teams from the same state outside of Victoria had finished in the top two positions.
- Geelong missed the finals for the first time since 2006.
- Fremantle was the first minor premier to fail to reach the Grand Final since Adelaide in 2005.
- North Melbourne became the first team in history to finish the home-and-away season in eighth position and qualify for a preliminary final.
- Hawthorn's score of 27.11 (173) against Carlton in round 17 was the highest score posted by any side, while St Kilda's score of 4.6 (30) against West Coast in round 23 was the lowest.
- Matt Priddis (West Coast) set a new record for most handpasses in a season. Priddis reached a total of 472 handpasses, surpassing the previous record of 445 set by Gary Ablett, Jr. in 2009.
- Todd Goldstein (North Melbourne) set a new record for most hit-outs in a season. Goldstein's final tally of 1,058 surpassed the previous record of 952 set by Gary Dempsey (North Melbourne) in 1982. Aaron Sandilands (Fremantle), who had 998 hit-outs for the season, also passed Dempsey's old record.

== Win/loss table ==
Team	1	2	3	4	5	6	7	8	9	10	11	12	13	14	15	16	17	18	19	20	21	22	23	F1	F2	F3	GF	Ladder
Adelaide	**NM** **+77**	Coll +27	**Melb** **+25**	WB −57	**PA** **−24**	GCS +41	**StK** **+46**	GWS −24	**Frem** **−11**	Carl +9	X	**Haw** **−29**	BL +13	**Geel**; **C**	WCE −56	PA +3	**GCS** **+45**	Syd −52	**Rich** **+36**	Ess +112	**BL** **+87**	**WCE** **+57**	Geel −39	WB +7	Haw −74	X	X	**7**
Brisbane Lions	**Coll** **−12**	NM −82	**Rich** **−79**	**WCE** **−53**	GCS −64	Carl +9	**PA** **+37**	Ess −58	**StK** **−22**	GWS −30	X	WB −72	**Adel** **−13**	Frem −36	**Syd** **−21**	Melb −24	**NM** **−72**	Geel −56	**GCS** **−14**	**Carl** **+64**	Adel −87	Haw −72	**WB** **+8**	X	X	X	X	17
Carlton	**Rich** **−27**	WCE −69	**Ess** **−21**	StK +40	**Coll** **−75**	**BL** **−9**	**GWS** **−78**	Geel −77	Syd −60	**Adel** **−9**	X	**PA** **+4**	**GCS** **+34**	WB −11	Rich −30	Frem −42	**Haw** **−138**	**NM** **−64**	Coll −18	BL −64	**Melb** **+23**	GWS −81	Haw −57	X	X	X	X	18
Collingwood	BL +12	**Adel** **−27**	**StK** **+74**	Ess +20	Carl +75	**Geel** **−41**	Rich −5	GCS +69	**NM** **+17**	Melb +25	**GWS** **+42**	X	Frem −7	**Haw** **−10**	PA −3	**WCE** **−31**	WB −18	**Melb** **−37**	**Carl** **+18**	Syd −11	**Rich** **−91**	Geel +48	**Ess** **−3**	X	X	X	X	12
Essendon	Syd −12	**Haw** **+2**	Carl +21	**Coll** **−20**	StK +2	Frem −28	**NM** **−11**	**BL** **+58**	Rich −13	**Geel** **−69**	WCE −50	X	Haw −38	**StK** **−110**	**Melb** **+9**	NM −25	**PA** **−13**	**WB** **−87**	GWS −32	**Adel** **−112**	GCS −2	**Rich** **−27**	Coll +3	X	X	X	X	15
Fremantle	**PA** **+7**	Geel +44	WCE +30	**Syd** **+14**	Melb +68	**Ess** **+28**	WB +13	**NM** **+73**	Adel +11	**Rich** **−27**	GCS +7	X	**Coll** **+7**	**BL** **+36**	Haw −72	**Carl** **+42**	Rich +4	**GWS** **+21**	StK +37	**WCE** **−24**	NM −11	**Melb** **+54**	PA −69	**Syd** **+9**	X	**Haw** **−27**	X	**1**
Geelong	Haw; 62	**Frem** **−44**	**GCS** **+9**	**NM** **−16**	Rich +9	Coll +41	Syd −43	**Carl** **+77**	WCE −56	Ess +69	PA +23	**Melb** **−24**	X	Adel; C	NM −41	**WB** **+8**	GWS +27	**BL** **+56**	**Syd** **+32**	**Haw** **−36**	StK; 0	**Coll** **−48**	**Adel** **+39**	X	X	X	X	10
Gold Coast	Melb −26	**StK** **−28**	Geel −9	GWS −66	**BL** **+64**	**Adel** **−41**	WCE −92	**Coll** **−69**	Haw −53	**Syd** **−52**	**Frem** **−7**	X	Carl −34	**NM** **+55**	WB −22	**GWS** **−15**	Adel −45	**WCE**; **0**	BL +14	Rich −83	**Ess** **+2**	**PA** **−37**	Syd −63	X	X	X	X	16
Greater Western Sydney	StK +9	**Melb** **+45**	Syd −21	**GCS** **+66**	WCE −87	**Haw** **+10**	Carl +78	**Adel** **+24**	WB −45	**BL** **+30**	Coll −42	**NM** **−56**	X	Rich −9	**StK** **+35**	GCS +15	**Geel** **−27**	Frem −21	**Ess** **+32**	PA −21	**Syd** **−89**	**Carl** **+81**	Melb −26	X	X	X	X	11
Hawthorn	**Geel** **+62**	Ess −2	**WB** **+70**	PA −8	NM +60	GWS −10	**Melb** **+105**	**Syd** **−4**	**GCS** **+53**	StK +63	X	Adel +29	**Ess** **+38**	Coll +10	**Frem** **+72**	Syd +89	Carl +138	**Rich** **−18**	WCE +14	Geel +36	**PA** **−22**	**BL** **+72**	**Carl** **+57**	WCE −32	**Adel** **+74**	Frem +27	**WCE** **+46**	**3**
Melbourne	**GCS** **+26**	GWS −45	Adel −25	Rich +32	**Frem** **−68**	**Syd** **−38**	Haw −105	**WB** **+39**	**PA** **−61**	**Coll** **−25**	StK −2	Geel +24	X	**WCE** **−54**	Ess −9	**BL** **+24**	**StK** **−37**	Coll +37	**NM** **−35**	WB −98	Carl −23	Frem −54	**GWS** **+26**	X	X	X	X	13
North Melbourne	Adel −77	**BL** **+82**	**PA** **−8**	Geel +16	**Haw** **−60**	**Rich** **+35**	Ess +11	Frem −73	Coll −17	**WCE** **+10**	**Syd** **−16**	GWS +56	X	GCS −55	**Geel** **+41**	**Ess** **+25**	BL +72	Carl +64	Melb +35	**StK** **+37**	**Frem** **+11**	**WB** **−23**	Rich −41	Rich +17	Syd +26	WCE −25	X	**8**
Port Adelaide	Frem −7	**Syd** **−48**	NM +8	**Haw** **+8**	Adel +24	**WCE** **−10**	BL −37	**Rich** **−33**	Melb +61	**WB** **+38**	**Geel** **−23**	Carl −4	X	Syd −10	**Coll** **+3**	**Adel** **−3**	Ess +13	**StK** **+63**	WB −64	**GWS** **+21**	Haw +22	GCS +37	**Frem** **+69**	X	X	X	X	9
Richmond	Carl +27	**WB** **−19**	BL +79	**Melb** **−32**	**Geel** **−9**	NM −35	**Coll** **+5**	PA +33	**Ess** **+13**	Frem +27	X	**WCE** **−20**	Syd +18	**GWS** **+9**	**Carl** **+30**	StK +16	**Frem** **−4**	Haw +18	Adel −36	**GCS** **+83**	Coll +91	Ess +27	**NM** **+41**	**NM** **−17**	X	X	X	**5**
St Kilda	**GWS** **−9**	GCS +28	Coll −74	**Carl** **−40**	**Ess** **−2**	WB +7	Adel −46	**WCE** **−53**	BL +22	**Haw** **−63**	**Melb** **+2**	X	**WB** **−6**	Ess +110	GWS −35	**Rich** **−16**	Melb +37	PA −63	**Frem** **−37**	NM −37	**Geel**; **0**	**Syd** **−97**	WCE −95	X	X	X	X	14
Sydney	**Ess** **+12**	PA +48	**GWS** **+21**	Frem −14	**WB** **−4**	Melb +38	**Geel** **+43**	Haw +4	**Carl** **+60**	GCS +52	NM +16	X	**Rich** **−18**	**PA** **+10**	BL +21	**Haw** **−89**	WCE −52	**Adel** **+52**	Geel −32	**Coll** **+11**	GWS +89	StK +97	**GCS** **+63**	Frem −9	**NM** **−26**	X	X	**4**
West Coast	WB −10	**Carl** **+69**	**Frem** **−30**	BL +53	**GWS** **+87**	PA +10	**GCS** **+92**	StK +53	**Geel** **+56**	NM −10	**Ess** **+50**	Rich +20	X	Melb +54	**Adel** **+56**	Coll +31	**Syd** **+52**	GCS; 0	**Haw** **−14**	Frem +24	**WB** **+77**	Adel −57	**StK** **+95**	**Haw** **+32**	X	**NM** **+25**	Haw −46	**2**
Western Bulldogs	**WCE** **+10**	Rich +19	Haw −70	**Adel** **+57**	Syd +4	**StK** **−7**	**Frem** **−13**	Melb −39	**GWS** **+45**	PA −38	X	**BL** **+72**	StK +6	**Carl** **+11**	**GCS** **+22**	Geel −8	**Coll** **+18**	Ess +87	**PA** **+64**	**Melb** **+98**	WCE −77	NM +23	BL −8	**Adel** **−7**	X	X	X	**6**
Team	1	2	3	4	5	6	7	8	9	10	11	12	13	14	15	16	17	18	19	20	21	22	23	F1	F2	F3	GF	Ladder

+	Win	Qualified for finals
−	Loss	Eliminated

Bold – Home game
X – Bye
C – Cancelled (Note: The round 14 Adelaide vs. Geelong match was cancelled due to the death of Adelaide coach, Phil Walsh, both clubs received two premiership points each, with no change to their percentages.)
Opponent for round listed above margin

== Ladder ==
Pos	Team	Pld	W	L	D	PF	PA	PP	Pts	Qualification
1	Fremantle	22	17	5	0	1857	1564	118.7	68	Finals series
2	West Coast	22	16	5	1	2330	1572	148.2	66	Finals series
3	Hawthorn (P)	22	16	6	0	2452	1548	158.4	64	Finals series
4	Sydney	22	16	6	0	2006	1578	127.1	64	Finals series
5	Richmond	22	15	7	0	1930	1568	123.1	60	Finals series
6	Western Bulldogs	22	14	8	0	2101	1825	115.1	56	Finals series
7	Adelaide	21	13	8	0	2107	1821	115.7	54 (Note: The round 14 match between Adelaide and Geelong was cancelled due to the death of Adelaide coach Phil Walsh, and both teams were awarded two premiership points each.)	Finals series
8	North Melbourne	22	13	9	0	2062	1937	106.5	52	Finals series
9	Port Adelaide	22	12	10	0	2002	1874	106.8	48	
10	Geelong	21	11	9	1	1853	1833	101.1	48	
11	Greater Western Sydney	22	11	11	0	1872	1891	99.0	44	
12	Collingwood	22	10	12	0	1972	1856	106.3	40	
13	Melbourne	22	7	15	0	1573	2044	77.0	28	
14	St Kilda	22	6	15	1	1695	2162	78.4	26	
15	Essendon	22	6	16	0	1580	2134	74.0	24	
16	Gold Coast	22	4	17	1	1633	2240	72.9	18	
17	Brisbane Lions	22	4	18	0	1557	2306	67.5	16	
18	Carlton	22	4	18	0	1525	2354	64.8	16	

Rules for classification: 1) points; 2) percentage; 3) number of points for.
(P) Premiers

=== Ladder progression ===
Numbers highlighted in green indicate that the team finished the round inside the top 8.
Numbers highlighted in blue indicates the team finished first on the ladder in that round.
Numbers highlighted in red indicates the team finished in last place on the ladder in that round.
Underlined numbers indicate that the team had a bye during that round.

Team ╲ Round	1	2	3	4	5	6	7	8	9	10	11	12	13	14	15	16	17	18	19	20	21	22	23
Fremantle	4	8	12	16	20	24	28	32	36	36	40	40	44	48	48	52	56	60	64	64	64	68	68
West Coast	0	4	4	8	12	16	20	24	28	28	32	36	36	40	44	48	52	54	54	58	62	62	66
Hawthorn	4	4	8	8	12	12	16	16	20	24	24	28	32	36	40	44	48	48	52	56	56	60	64
Sydney	4	8	12	12	12	16	20	24	28	32	36	36	36	40	44	44	44	48	48	52	56	60	64
Richmond	4	4	8	8	8	8	12	16	20	24	24	24	28	32	36	40	40	44	44	48	52	56	60
Western Bulldogs	4	8	8	12	16	16	16	16	20	20	20	24	28	32	36	36	40	44	48	52	52	56	56
Adelaide	4	8	12	12	12	16	20	20	20	24	24	24	28	30	30	34	38	38	42	46	50	54	54
North Melbourne	0	4	4	8	8	12	16	16	16	20	20	24	24	24	28	32	36	40	44	48	52	52	52
Port Adelaide	0	0	4	8	12	12	12	12	16	20	20	20	20	20	24	24	28	32	32	36	40	44	48
Geelong	0	0	4	4	8	12	12	16	16	20	24	24	24	26	26	30	34	38	42	42	44	44	48
Greater Western Sydney	4	8	8	12	12	16	20	24	24	28	28	28	28	28	32	36	36	36	40	40	40	44	44
Collingwood	4	4	8	12	16	16	16	20	24	28	32	32	32	32	32	32	32	32	36	36	36	40	40
Melbourne	4	4	4	8	8	8	8	12	12	12	12	16	16	16	16	20	20	24	24	24	24	24	28
St Kilda	0	4	4	4	4	8	8	8	12	12	16	16	16	20	20	20	24	24	24	24	26	26	26
Essendon	0	4	8	8	12	12	12	16	16	16	16	16	16	16	20	20	20	20	20	20	20	20	24
Gold Coast	0	0	0	0	4	4	4	4	4	4	4	4	4	8	8	8	8	10	14	14	18	18	18
Brisbane Lions	0	0	0	0	0	4	8	8	8	8	8	8	8	8	8	8	8	8	8	12	12	12	16
Carlton	0	0	0	4	4	4	4	4	4	4	4	8	12	12	12	12	12	12	12	12	16	16	16

== Finals series ==
Qualifying and elimination finals
12 Sep, Domain Stadium
1	Fremantle	10.9 (69)
4	Sydney	7.18 (60)
13 Sep, MCG
5	Richmond	14.4 (88)
8	North Melbourne	15.15 (105)
12 Sep, MCG
6	Western Bulldogs	14.18 (102)
7	Adelaide	16.13 (109)
11 Sep, Domain Stadium
2	West Coast	14.12 (96)
3	Hawthorn	9.10 (64)

Semi-finals
19 Sep, ANZ Stadium
Sydney	7.9 (51)
North Melbourne	11.11 (77)
18 Sep, MCG
Hawthorn	21.9 (135)
Adelaide	8.13 (61)

Preliminary finals
25 Sep, Domain Stadium
Fremantle	10.7 (67)
Hawthorn	15.4 (94)
26 Sep, Domain Stadium
West Coast	10.20 (80)
North Melbourne	7.13 (55)

Grand final
3 Oct, MCG
Hawthorn	16.11 (107)
West Coast	8.13 (61)

=== Week one ===
	Qualifying Finals
QF2: Friday, 11 September (6:20 pm)	West Coast 14.12 (96)	def.	Hawthorn 9.10 (64)	Domain Stadium (crowd: 42,663)	Report
QF1: Saturday, 12 September (1:20 pm)	Fremantle 10.9 (69)	def.	Sydney 7.18 (60)	Domain Stadium (crowd: 40,071)	Report

	Elimination Finals
EF2: Saturday, 12 September (7:20 pm)	Western Bulldogs 14.18 (102)	def. by	Adelaide 16.13 (109)	MCG (crowd: 60,782)	Report
EF1: Sunday, 13 September (3:20 pm)	Richmond 14.4 (88)	def. by	North Melbourne 15.15 (105)	MCG (crowd: 90,186)	Report

=== Week two ===
	Semi-finals
SF2: Friday, 18 September (7:50 pm)	Hawthorn 21.9 (135)	def.	Adelaide 8.13 (61)	MCG (crowd: 70,879)	Report
SF1: Saturday, 19 September (7:20 pm)	Sydney 7.9 (51)	def. by	North Melbourne 11.11 (77)	ANZ Stadium (crowd: 31,162)	Report
Adelaide's 74-point loss to Hawthorn was its heaviest defeat in a final.

=== Week three ===
	Preliminary Finals
PF1: Friday, 25 September (6:20 pm)	Fremantle 10.7 (67)	def. by	Hawthorn 15.4 (94)	Domain Stadium (crowd: 41,508)	Report
PF2: Saturday, 26 September (5:45 pm)	West Coast 10.20 (80)	def.	North Melbourne 7.13 (55)	Domain Stadium (crowd: 43,080)	Report

=== Week four ===
	Grand Final
GF: Saturday, 3 October (2:30 pm)	Hawthorn 16.11 (107)	def.	West Coast 8.13 (61)	MCG (crowd: 98,633)	Report
Hawthorn became the first team to win three consecutive premierships since the Brisbane Lions in 2001, 2002 and 2003.

== Attendances ==
=== By club ===
2015 AFL attendances
Club	Total	Games	Avg. Per Game	Home Total	Home Games	Home Avg.
Adelaide	904726	23	39336	464868	10	46487
Brisbane Lions	467466	22	21248	207016	11	18820
Carlton	760055	22	34548	423018	11	38456
Collingwood	1054044	22	47911	519844	11	47259
Essendon	894335	22	40652	467552	11	42505
Fremantle	772497	24	32187	398308	11	36210
Geelong	720052	21	34288	325395	11	29581
Gold Coast	394321	22	17924	135966	11	12361
Greater Western Sydney	402019	22	18274	118651	11	10786
Hawthorn	1153600	26	44369	424884	11	38626
Melbourne	653802	22	29718	276802	11	25164
North Melbourne	773402	25	30936	282417	11	25674
Port Adelaide	737269	22	33512	471840	11	42895
Richmond	1144590	23	49764	548642	11	49877
St Kilda	590051	22	26821	285262	11	25933
Sydney	772252	24	32177	346735	11	31521
West Coast	889816	25	35593	395860	11	35987
Western Bulldogs	655063	23	28481	257464	11	23406

=== By ground ===
2015 ground attendances
Ground	Total	Games	Avg. Per Game
Adelaide Oval	936890	21	44614
ANZ Stadium	119868	4	29967
Aurora Stadium	55402	4	13851
Blundstone Arena	43901	3	14634
Cazaly's Stadium	9449	1	9449
Domain Stadium	961490	26	36980
Etihad Stadium	1301878	46	28302
Gabba	207016	11	18820
MCG	2495287	50	49906
Metricon Stadium	135966	11	12361
SCG	258029	8	32254
Simonds Stadium	196979	8	24622
Spotless Stadium	88256	8	11032
StarTrack Oval	30395	3	10132
TIO Stadium	11873	1	11873
TIO Traeger Park	4866	1	4866
Westpac Stadium	12125	1	12125

== Awards ==
- The Brownlow Medal was awarded to Nat Fyfe of Fremantle, who received 31 votes.
- The Coleman Medal was awarded to Josh Kennedy of West Coast, who kicked 75 goals during the home and away season.
- The Ron Evans Medal was awarded to Jesse Hogan of Melbourne, who received 49 votes.
- The Norm Smith Medal was awarded to Cyril Rioli of Hawthorn.
- The AFL Goal of the Year was awarded to Eddie Betts of Adelaide.
- The AFL Mark of the Year was awarded to Nic Naitanui of West Coast.
- The McClelland Trophy was awarded to Fremantle for the first time in their history.
- The wooden spoon was "awarded" to Carlton for the first time since 2006.
- The AFL Players Association awards
  - The Leigh Matthews Trophy was awarded to Nat Fyfe of Fremantle for the second consecutive year.
  - The Robert Rose Award was awarded to Luke Parker of Sydney.
  - The Best Captain was awarded to Robert Murphy of the Western Bulldogs.
  - The Best First-Year Player was awarded to Isaac Heeney of Sydney.
  - The 22under22 Team captaincy was awarded to Jake Stringer of the Western Bulldogs.
- The AFL Coaches Association Awards
  - The AFL Coaches Association Player of the Year Award was awarded to Dan Hannebery of Sydney, who received 101 votes.
  - The Allan Jeans Senior Coach of the Year Award was awarded to Luke Beveridge of the Western Bulldogs.
  - The Assistant Coach of the Year Award was awarded to Adam Kingsley of St Kilda.
  - The Development Coach of the Year Award was awarded to Paul Hudson of St Kilda.
  - The Lifetime Achievement Award was awarded to David Wheadon.
  - The Best Young Player Award was awarded to Marcus Bontempelli of the Western Bulldogs.
  - The Media Award was awarded to Gerard Whateley for his work on Fox Footy and ABC.
- The Jim Stynes Community Leadership Award was awarded to Dennis Armfield of Carlton.

=== Milestones ===
Name	Club	Milestone	Round
Heritier Lumumba	Melbourne	200 AFL games	Round 1
Sam Fisher	St Kilda	200 AFL games	Round 2
Brendon Goddard	Essendon	250 AFL games	Round 3
Grant Birchall	Hawthorn	200 AFL games	Round 7
Jarrad McVeigh	Sydney	250 AFL games	Round 7
Scott Pendlebury	Collingwood	200 AFL games	Round 8
Kane Cornes	Port Adelaide	300 AFL games	Round 8
Angus Monfries	Port Adelaide	200 AFL games	Round 9
Heath Shaw	Greater Western Sydney	200 AFL games	Round 9
Dustin Fletcher	Essendon	400 AFL games	Round 9
Michael Johnson	Fremantle	200 AFL games	Round 10
Corey Enright	Geelong	300 AFL games	Round 12
Farren Ray	St Kilda	200 AFL games	Round 13
Matthew Boyd	Western Bulldogs	250 AFL games	Round 14
Jobe Watson	Essendon	200 AFL games	Round 14
Dane Swan	Collingwood	250 AFL games	Round 15
Luke McPharlin	Fremantle	250 AFL games	Round 15
Dale Morris	Western Bulldogs	200 AFL games	Round 16
Lance Franklin	Sydney	700 AFL goals	Round 16
Marc Murphy	Carlton	200 AFL games	Round 17
Troy Chaplin	Richmond	200 AFL games	Round 17
Brent Harvey	North Melbourne	400 AFL games	Round 17
Jed Adcock	Brisbane Lions	200 AFL games	Round 17
Jarrad Waite	North Melbourne	200 AFL games	Round 18
Joel Selwood	Geelong	200 AFL games	Round 19
Sean Dempster	St Kilda	200 AFL games	Round 19
Steve Johnson	Geelong	250 AFL games	Round 20
Paul Roos	Melbourne	600 AFL games played/coached	Round 21
Michael Firrito	North Melbourne	250 AFL games	Round 22
Ted Richards	Sydney	250 AFL games	Round 22
Nathan Jones	Melbourne	200 AFL games	Round 22
Nathan Van Berlo	Adelaide	200 AFL games	Round 23
Brian Lake	Hawthorn	250 AFL games	Preliminary final
Nick Dal Santo	North Melbourne	300 AFL games	Preliminary final

=== Coleman Medal ===
- Numbers highlighted in blue indicates the player led the Coleman that round.
- Underlined numbers indicates the player did not play that round.

	Player	1	2	3	4	5	6	7	8	9	10	11	12	13	14	15	16	17	18	19	20	21	22	23	Total
1	Josh J. Kennedy	2_{2}	10_{12}	1_{13}	3_{16}	6_{22}	1_{23}	4_{27}	4_{31}	6_{37}	3_{40}	3_{43}	3_{46}	0_{46}	2_{48}	2_{50}	3_{53}	3_{56}	2_{58}	4_{62}	2_{64}	7_{71}	1_{72}	3_{75}	75
2	Jeremy Cameron	4_{4}	1_{5}	2_{7}	4_{11}	1_{12}	7_{19}	5_{24}	2_{26}	3_{29}	3_{32}	2_{34}	1_{35}	0_{35}	2_{37}	5_{42}	2_{44}	0_{44}	2_{46}	2_{48}	3_{51}	3_{54}	7_{61}	2_{63}	63
3	Eddie Betts	4_{4}	1_{5}	1_{6}	4_{10}	5_{15}	5_{20}	6_{26}	3_{29}	2_{31}	1_{32}	0_{32}	1_{33}	2_{35}	0_{35}	2_{37}	1_{38}	3_{41}	1_{42}	2_{44}	5_{49}	3_{52}	2_{54}	4_{58}	58
4	Taylor Walker	6_{6}	2_{8}	3_{11}	1_{12}	2_{14}	4_{18}	3_{21}	4_{25}	0_{25}	1_{26}	0_{26}	1_{27}	2_{29}	0_{29}	3_{32}	3_{35}	2_{37}	2_{39}	2_{41}	3_{44}	7_{51}	3_{54}	1_{55}	55
5	Jake Stringer	3_{3}	2_{5}	0_{5}	6_{11}	1_{12}	4_{16}	0_{16}	2_{18}	0_{18}	2_{20}	0_{20}	5_{25}	0_{25}	3_{28}	2_{30}	1_{31}	1_{32}	4_{36}	4_{40}	4_{44}	5_{49}	1_{50}	4_{54}	54
6	Chad Wingard	2_{2}	1_{3}	1_{4}	1_{5}	2_{7}	2_{9}	1_{10}	2_{12}	2_{14}	3_{17}	4_{21}	5_{26}	0_{26}	3_{29}	3_{32}	3_{35}	3_{38}	4_{42}	2_{44}	3_{47}	4_{51}	2_{53}	0_{53}	53
7	Jack Gunston	1_{1}	3_{4}	2_{6}	3_{9}	4_{13}	2_{15}	1_{16}	1_{17}	2_{19}	3_{22}	0_{22}	0_{22}	3_{25}	2_{27}	0_{27}	4_{31}	6_{37}	3_{40}	0_{40}	1_{41}	3_{44}	4_{48}	4_{52}	52
8	Josh Bruce	2_{2}	6_{8}	2_{10}	2_{12}	5_{17}	1_{18}	5_{23}	2_{25}	1_{26}	2_{28}	1_{29}	0_{29}	3_{32}	5_{37}	2_{39}	1_{40}	1_{41}	1_{42}	1_{43}	2_{45}	3_{48}	0_{48}	2_{50}	50
8	Jack Riewoldt	4_{4}	2_{6}	4_{10}	0_{10}	3_{13}	3_{16}	4_{20}	4_{24}	1_{25}	2_{27}	0_{27}	1_{28}	6_{34}	2_{36}	3_{39}	2_{41}	1_{42}	1_{43}	1_{44}	2_{46}	2_{48}	0_{48}	2_{50}	50
10	Lance Franklin	3_{3}	3_{6}	5_{11}	2_{13}	3_{16}	0_{16}	4_{20}	0_{20}	7_{27}	3_{30}	4_{34}	0_{34}	2_{36}	0_{36}	3_{39}	3_{42}	0_{42}	3_{45}	0_{45}	0_{45}	0_{45}	1_{46}	1_{47}	47

=== Best and fairest ===
Club	Award name	Player	Ref.
Adelaide	Malcolm Blight Medal	Patrick Dangerfield	
Brisbane Lions	Merrett–Murray Medal	Dayne Beams	
Brisbane Lions	Merrett–Murray Medal	Stefan Martin	
Brisbane Lions	Merrett–Murray Medal	Mitch Robinson	
Brisbane Lions	Merrett–Murray Medal	Dayne Zorko	
Carlton	John Nicholls Medal	Patrick Cripps	
Collingwood	Copeland Trophy	Scott Pendlebury	
Essendon	Crichton Medal	Cale Hooker	
Fremantle	Doig Medal	Aaron Sandilands	
Geelong	Carji Greeves Medal	Mark Blicavs	
Gold Coast	Club Champion	Tom Lynch	
Greater Western Sydney	Kevin Sheedy Medal	Heath Shaw	
Hawthorn	Peter Crimmins Medal	Josh Gibson	
Melbourne	Keith 'Bluey' Truscott Medal	Bernie Vince	
North Melbourne	Syd Barker Medal	Todd Goldstein	
Port Adelaide	John Cahill Medal	Robbie Gray	
Richmond	Jack Dyer Medal	Alex Rance	
St Kilda	Trevor Barker Award	Jack Steven	
Sydney	Bob Skilton Medal	Josh Kennedy	
West Coast	John Worsfold Medal	Andrew Gaff	
Western Bulldogs	Charles Sutton Medal	Easton Wood	

== Club leadership ==
Club	Coach	Captain(s)	Vice-captain(s)	Leadership group
Adelaide	Phil Walsh (Rds 1–13); Scott Camporeale (Rds 15–SF)	Taylor Walker		Patrick Dangerfield, Rory Sloane, Daniel Talia, Scott Thompson, Nathan van Berlo
Brisbane Lions	Justin Leppitsch	Tom Rockliff	Pearce Hanley, Daniel Rich, Dayne Zorko	
Carlton	Mick Malthouse (Rds 1–8); John Barker (Rds 9–23)	Marc Murphy	Bryce Gibbs, Michael Jamison	Lachie Henderson, Sam Rowe
Collingwood	Nathan Buckley	Scott Pendlebury	Nathan Brown, Travis Cloke, Tyson Goldsack, Steele Sidebottom	
Essendon	James Hird (Rds 1–20); Matthew Egan (Rds 21–23)	Jobe Watson		Paul Chapman, Brendon Goddard, Dyson Heppell, Cale Hooker, David Myers, Brent Stanton, David Zaharakis
Fremantle	Ross Lyon	Matthew Pavlich		Nat Fyfe, Luke McPharlin, David Mundy, Aaron Sandilands, Lee Spurr
Geelong	Chris Scott	Joel Selwood	Harry Taylor	Corey Enright, Tom Hawkins, Andrew Mackie
Gold Coast	Rodney Eade	Gary Ablett	Tom Lynch, Nick Malceski, Dion Prestia, Michael Rischitelli, David Swallow	
Greater Western Sydney	Leon Cameron	Phil Davis; Callan Ward	Tom Scully, Heath Shaw	Shane Mumford
Hawthorn	Alastair Clarkson	Luke Hodge	Jarryd Roughead, Jordan Lewis	
Melbourne	Paul Roos	Nathan Jones	Lynden Dunn	Daniel Cross, Chris Dawes, Jack Grimes, Heritier Lumumba
North Melbourne	Brad Scott	Andrew Swallow	Jack Ziebell, Drew Petrie	Nick Dal Santo, Sam Gibson, Jamie Macmillan, Drew Petrie, Scott Thompson, Jack Ziebell
Port Adelaide	Ken Hinkley	Travis Boak	Brad Ebert, Matthew Lobbe	Hamish Hartlett, Tom Jonas, Jackson Trengove, Ollie Wines
Richmond	Damien Hardwick	Trent Cotchin	Brett Deledio, Ivan Maric	Troy Chaplin, Steven Morris
St Kilda	Alan Richardson	Nick Riewoldt		David Armitage, Sean Dempster, Jarryn Geary, Leigh Montagna, Jack Newnes, Maverick Weller
Sydney	John Longmire	Kieren Jack; Jarrad McVeigh		Adam Goodes, Josh Kennedy, Luke Parker, Rhyce Shaw, Nick Smith
West Coast	Adam Simpson	Shannon Hurn	Josh Kennedy, Scott Selwood	Eric Mackenzie, Matt Priddis, Beau Waters
Western Bulldogs	Luke Beveridge	Robert Murphy	Jordan Roughead	Matthew Boyd, Tom Liberatore, Dale Morris

== Coach changes ==
Coach	Club	Date	Notes	Caretaker	New coach
Mick Malthouse	Carlton	26 May 2015	Sacked after the Carlton board lost trust in Malthouse and the club and coach were not aligned, in addition to the club suffering from poor results on the field.	John Barker	Brendon Bolton
Phil Walsh	Adelaide	3 July 2015	Deceased	Scott Camporeale	Don Pyke
James Hird	Essendon	18 August 2015	Resigned due to poor on-field performances	Matthew Egan	John Worsfold

== Club financials ==
2015 AFL membership figures
Club	Members	Change from 2014	% Change from 2014
Adelaide	52,920	▼1,329	▼2.45%
Brisbane Lions	25,408	▲1,396	▲5.81%
Carlton	47,305	▼180	▼0.38%
Collingwood	75,037	▼2,850	▼5.43%
Essendon	60,818	▲172	▲0.28%
Fremantle	51,433	▲2,656	▲5.45%
Geelong	44,312	▲509	▲1.16%
Gold Coast	13,643	▲165	▲1.22%
Greater Western Sydney	13,480	▲440	▲3.37%
Hawthorn	72,924	▲4,274	▲6.23%
Melbourne	35,953	▲42	▲0.12%
North Melbourne	41,012	▲2425	▲6.15%
Port Adelaide	54,057	▲5,089	▲10.39%
Richmond	70,809	▲4,687	▲7.09%
St Kilda	32,746	▲2,007	▲6.53%
Sydney	48,836	▲8,710	▲21.71%
West Coast	60,221	▲1,692	▲2.89%
Western Bulldogs	35,222	▲3,684	▲11.68%
Total	836,136	▲31,656	▲3.93%

== Post-season ==
=== International Rules Series ===
The International Rules Series returned in November 2015, with Ireland entitled to the hosting rights. The match was played on Saturday, 21 November 2015 at Dublin's Croke Park. A highly qualified Australian side, who were looking for back-to-back series wins, fell to a classy Irish team by 4 points.

	2015 International Rules Test
Saturday, 21 November (7:00pm IST)	Ireland 3.11.5 (56)	def.	Australia 1.13.7 (52)	Croke Park, Dublin (crowd: 38,386)	Report
Jim Stynes Medal: Harry Taylor

== Notable events and controversies ==
=== Doping and drugs ===
The AFL suffered significant bad publicity during 2015 related to four cases of illicit substance abuse in AFL clubs – three related to doping and one related to recreational drugs:

- The Essendon Football Club supplements controversy – relating to the supplements program operating at the Essendon Football Club during the 2011/12 offseason – continued to be heard during the 2015 season. The 34 players implicated in the controversy were served with infraction notices in November 2014, and were provisionally suspended until their hearings at the AFL anti-doping tribunal were complete. In the week before the start of the AFL season, the players were found not guilty and their suspensions were lifted. In May 2015, the World Anti-Doping Agency announced an appeal of the not guilty verdicts to the Court of Arbitration for Sport; this was ultimately heard in early 2016, and resulted in the not guilty verdicts being overturned and many players being suspended for the 2016 season.
- Ryan Crowley (Fremantle) faced the AFL anti-doping tribunal after having tested positive to a banned substance in a drug test after Fremantle's round 17, 2014 win against Greater Western Sydney. He commenced a provisional suspension commenced after a positive confirmation tests (also known as B-sample) mid September 2014. He appeared before the AFL Tribunal in May 2015, and was found guilty suspended for twelve months, backdated to the beginning of his provisional suspension; he became eligible to play again on 25 September 2015. The banned substance has not been identified, but is understood to have been present in a painkiller which Crowley had taken but which was not prescribed by the club doctor.
- Lachlan Keeffe and Josh Thomas (both of Collingwood) tested positive to the banned substance clenbuterol in drug tests taken in February 2015. Both accepted provisional suspensions in March and returned positive B-samples in May. Both were handed infraction notices in July and accepted two-year bans in August (backdated to March), in addition they were delisted and fined $50,000 each by Collingwood.
- In late June, former Gold Coast player Karmichael Hunt, who was being investigated by the Queensland Crime and Corruption Commission over allegations of cocaine supply and possession, named several current Gold Coast players as having taken illicit recreational drugs during his time at the club. Although nothing further came from Hunt's allegations, days later, photographs from early 2013 emerged showing Gold Coast's Harley Bennell using speed; and a teammate, whose anonymity is protected under the AFL's drugs policy, self-reported shortly afterwards that he had also been present and taken the drug. Bennell was fined $5000 and suspended for three matches.

=== Death of Phil Walsh ===
In the early hours of Friday 3 July 2015, Adelaide coach Phil Walsh was found dead at his Adelaide residency following a domestic violence incident; he was killed by his son, Cy, who was charged with his murder, and ultimately found not guilty due to mental incompetence, meaning he is now subject to a lifetime psychiatric supervision order and is permanently detained at the James Nash House forensic Mental Health Facility. Walsh's wife Meredith also suffered injuries in the incident. In the immediate aftermath, the match between Adelaide and Geelong, which was to have been played on Sunday 5 July, was cancelled, with the clubs sharing two premiership points each. At the remaining seven matches of the round (Sydney and Port Adelaide had already played on Thursday night), respect was paid to Walsh by observing moments of silence both before and after the match; and pre- and post-match celebrations or promotions, including the playing of club songs and running through banners, were not carried out.
