= Nat Fyfe =

Australian rules footballer (born 1991)

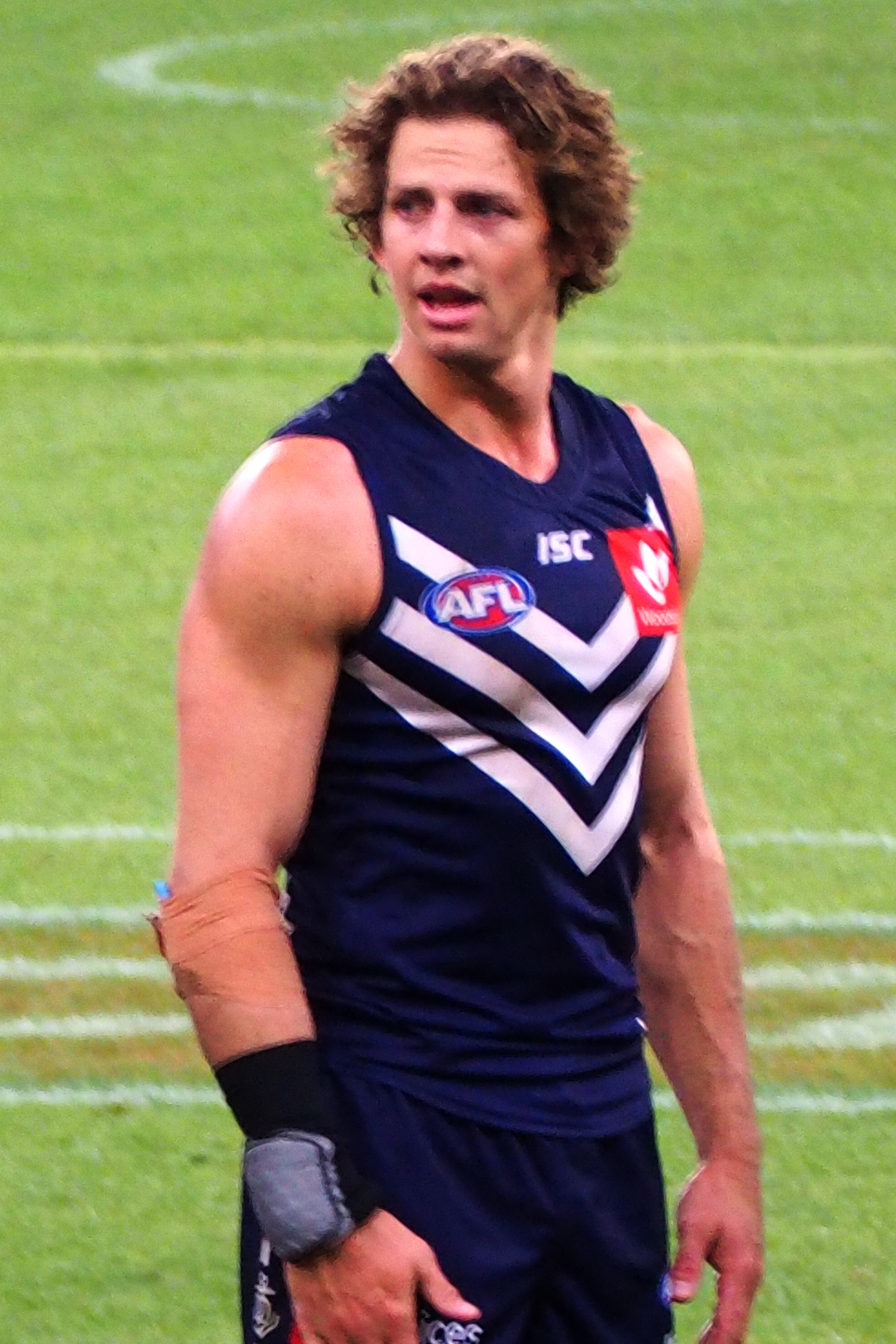
- Fyfe playing for Fremantle in 2019

Personal information
- Full name: Nathan David Fyfe
- Born: 18 September 1991 (age 35); Lake Grace, Western Australia
- Original team: Claremont (WAFL)
- Draft: No. 20, 2009 national draft
- Debut: Round 5, 2010, Fremantle vs. Richmond, at Subiaco Oval
- Height: 193 cm (6 ft 4 in)
- Weight: 96 kg (212 lb)
- Position: Midfielder / forward

Playing career
Years	Club	Games (Goals)
2010–2025	Fremantle	248 (178)

Representative team honours
Years	Team	Games (Goals)
2020	All Stars	1 (0)

International team honours
2017	Australia	2 (1)

Career highlights
- Fremantle captain: 2017–2022; 2× Brownlow Medal: 2015, 2019; 2× Leigh Matthews Trophy: 2014, 2015; 3× All-Australian team: 2014, 2015, 2019 (c); 3× Doig Medal: 2013, 2014, 2019; 4x Fremantle Player's Award: 2014, 2015, 2017, 2019; Jim Stynes Medal: 2017; AFLCA best young player of the year: 2011; AFL Rising Star nominee: 2010; 22 Under 22 team: 2013

Nathan David Fyfe (born 18 September 1991) is a former professional Australian rules footballer who played for the Fremantle Football Club in the Australian Football League (AFL). Fyfe is a dual Brownlow Medallist, dual Leigh Matthews Trophy recipient, three-time All-Australian (including as captain in the 2019 team) and three-time Doig Medallist. Fyfe served as Fremantle captain from 2017 to 2022.

== Early life ==
Fyfe grew up in Lake Grace, Western Australia, and went to school as a boarder at Aquinas College in Perth. In 2009, he played in the West Australian Football League colts for Claremont, his highlights of the season being his eight-goal, 34 possession performance against East Fremantle and six goals in the Colts Grand Final. In 2010, he made his league debut, kicking 4 goals against Peel Thunder.

He was also selected for Western Australia in the 2009 AFL National Under 18 Championships and played four of the five games, kicking nine goals. His best return came in the game against Vic Metro in which he scored four goals.

== AFL career ==
=== 2010–2012: Early career ===
Fyfe was selected by the Fremantle Dockers with the 20th pick in the 2009 national draft. Fyfe made his debut in Fremantle's 39-point win over the Richmond Tigers in the annual Len Hall ANZAC Day game at Subiaco Oval in 2010. He announced his arrival in the AFL with a soaring pack mark. A week later he was nominated for Goal of the Week after a brilliant snap against West Coast. Fyfe became the 150th player to represent the Fremantle Dockers at AFL level. He was awarded the AFL Rising Star nomination for Round 9 in the 2010 AFL season after performing well in Fremantle's first victory over the Sydney Swans in Sydney since 1996. He collected 23 possessions, four clearances, five tackles and seven marks and played on senior Sydney player Ryan O'Keefe for most of the game.

Fyfe continued to improve and had a sensational second season in the AFL, finishing a close second to Matthew Pavlich in the Doig Medal. He featured in the top five in almost every key performance indicator category at Fremantle in 2011. Fyfe topped the club in disposals per game (25.1), total disposals (527), contested possessions (262), hard ball gets (107), total effective handballs (186), contested marks (43), smothers (19) and Dream Team points (98.4 per game). His form led him to be considered as a potential All-Australian team selection and gained comparisons to past champion James Hird. Fyfe polled an equal team high 13 Brownlow Medal votes and was selected in the initial All-Australian squad of 40 but did not make the final team. At the end of the 2011 season, Fyfe re-signed with Fremantle on a three-year deal.

Fyfe made a strong start to the 2012 AFL Season with a best-on-ground performance against Geelong in their Round 1 match at Patersons Stadium, recording 30 disposals and 2 goals in the 4-point win over the Cats. Fyfe began dealing with a shoulder injury during April, and attempted to play through it, but was forced out and underwent surgery in May after dislocating it at training. Fyfe missed the majority of the season, being sidelined from Round 6 until 18. He returned to Fremantle in Round 18 against Port Adelaide, returning to his previous form by recording, 26 disposals. Fyfe only missed one game for the remainder of the season, missing a game against Adelaide in Round 20 due to an ankle injury incurred on the morning of the match in his hotel room. Despite playing only nine games in the home and away season – two of which were compromised because of his shoulder, Fyfe still polled the second-most Brownlow Medal votes (14) at Fremantle. On a per game basis, Fyfe was clearly Fremantle's best contested possession winner (12.5), which was also 14th overall in the AFL.

=== 2013–2015: Grand final appearance and first Brownlow Medal ===
Fyfe continued to improve throughout the 2013 AFL Season, increasing his average disposals from the previous two years (25.9) and winning his first Doig Medal, beating out David Mundy. Fyfe had a hand in leading Fremantle to a 16–1–5 win–loss record, helping them finish third on the ladder, and reaching their first ever AFL Grand Final in club history, but despite having an equal game-high 28 disposals in the match, the Dockers were defeated by Hawthorn by 15 points, ending the club's best season in their 19-year history just short of their first premiership success. Fyfe had a strong final's series, averaging 26.0 disposals. Fyfe announced early in 2014 that he would not consider extending his contract with Fremantle until later in the year, leading to speculation that he might change clubs when his contract expired at the end of the season. However, he agreed to extend his contract with Fremantle for a further three years in late June.

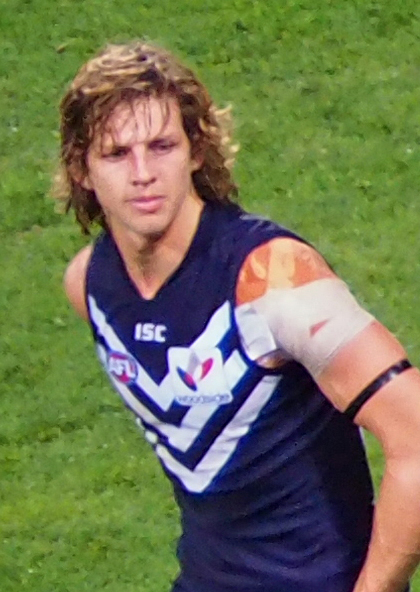
Fyfe playing in 2014

Fyfe started the 2014 AFL Season strongly, but was controversially suspended for two weeks in Round 2 for a bump on Gold Coast player Michael Rischitelli. He was one of the first players to be suspended under a new rule that penalised the player for any head contact as a result of choosing to bump instead of tackle. Throughout the season, Fyfe was considered to be one of the favourites to win the Brownlow Medal, but was ineligible due to the suspension. Fyfe played in his 100th senior appearance for Fremantle in Round 8 against North Melbourne, Fyfe recorded 37 disposals and 11 clearances in the 73-point win. Fyfe continued his strong form for the remainder of the season, increasing his average disposal count from 25.9 to 27.0 a game, recording a career-high goals (24), and was now being considered one of the elite midfielders in the league. He was suspended again late in the season for a behind the play strike on Jordan Lewis, missing the final two matches before returning for the finals. Fyfe had a strong final series, recording 29 disposals, 5 inside-fifties, 7 clearances and 1 goal in the qualifying final against Sydney. Fyfe followed up that performance by recording 28 disposals, 11 tackles, 7 clearances, and 2 goals in the semi-final against Port Adelaide, despite his strong performances Fremantle were eliminated from the finals in straight sets, losing both games. Fyfe's tremendous season was recognised when he received several individual honours, he was awarded Leigh Matthews Trophy at the 2014 AFL Players Association awards, as the league's most valuable player (MVP). Fyfe polled 945 votes, ahead of five-time winner Gary Ablett with 787 votes. Fyfe then received his second Doig Medal for successive seasons and made his first All-Australian team, being included in the midfield. Despite being ineligible to win the Brownlow Medal, Fyfe finished with 25 votes, one vote behind the winner Matt Priddis (26).

Fyfe carried his strong form into the 2015 AFL Season, recording 31 disposals, 1 goal, and 7 inside-fifties in Fremantle's Round 1 win over Port Adelaide. Fyfe continued that form throughout the season, once again increasing his disposal average from previous seasons with 28.8 per-game. Along with his own individual dominance, Fyfe helped Fremantle to a 17–5 win–loss record, resulting in Fremantle finishing 1st on the ladder for the first time in club history and claiming the McClelland Trophy. Fyfe had a strong start to the finals series, recording 32 disposals and 8 clearances in Fremantle's win over Sydney in the qualifying final. Fyfe played in Fremantle's preliminary final loss against Hawthorn with a fractured leg, only recording 24 disposals in the 27-point loss. Fyfe only played in 18 home-and-away games during the season, but was still able to win the Brownlow Medal, polling 31 votes, whilst collecting 29 votes from Rounds 2 to 14. He became the first Brownlow Medal winner from Fremantle and polled three votes ahead of the previous winner, Matt Priddis. To round out the 2015 season, Fyfe won his second Leigh Matthews Trophy at the 2015 AFL Players Association awards, as the league's most valuable player (MVP) for successive years, was named the WA Media Awards AFL Player of the Year, the WA Sports Star of the Year, and made his second successive All-Australian Team as a midfielder.

=== 2016–2018: Injury struggles and captaincy ===
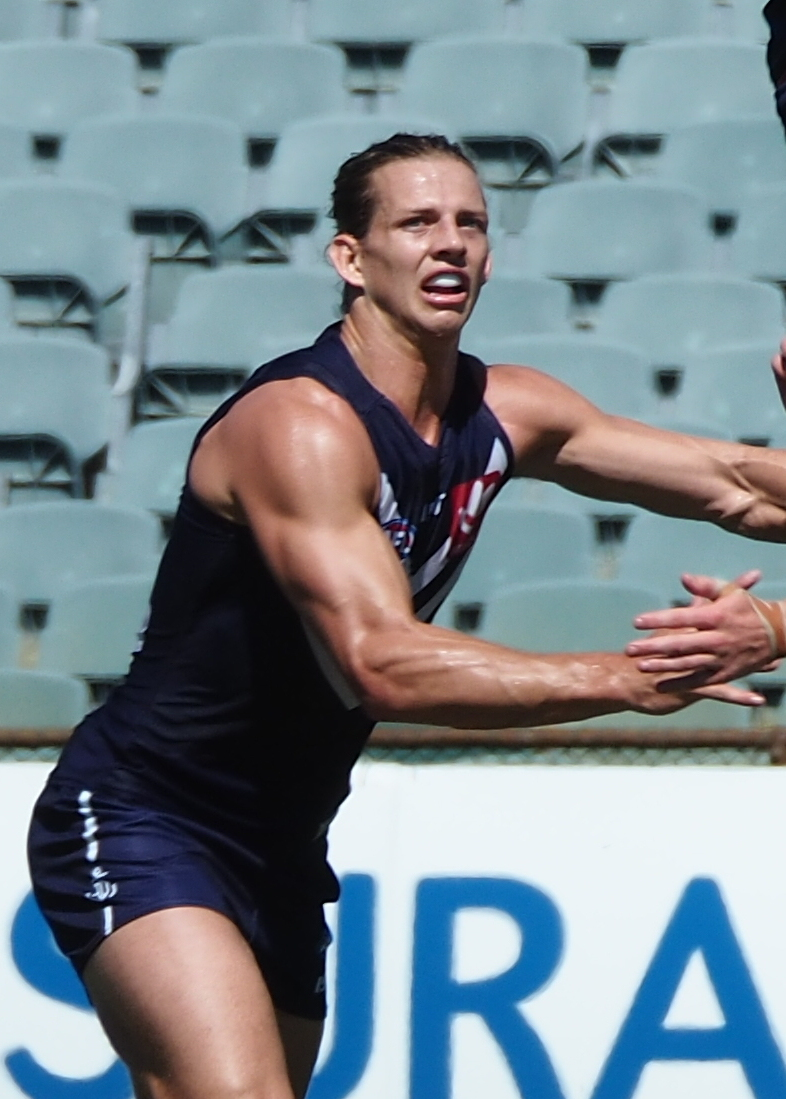
Fyfe playing in 2016

Fyfe opened the 2016 AFL Season with a poor performance against the Western Bulldogs, only recording 15 disposals, but Fyfe quickly turned his form around and looked set to have a career best season, recording a total of 87 disposals, 8 goals, 21 tackles, and 22 clearances in the next three games, during those three games Fyfe kicked an equal game-high four goals against North Melbourne in Round 4. Unfortunately for Fyfe, he suffered another fracture to the same leg in Round 5. He had a plate inserted into the leg, and in May 2016, following medical advice, Fremantle opted to have the plate removed once the bone had healed, ruling Fyfe out for the remainder of the season. Without Fyfe, Fremantle dropped from minor premiers (1st) in 2015 to 16th in 2016.

In February 2017, Fyfe was announced as Fremantle's captain and he returned from his injury during the 2017 JLT Community Series against the West Coast Eagles, he recorded 22 disposals in the 55-point loss. Fyfe's stats decreased during the 2017 season, only averaging 26.4 disposals down from the 28.8 he averaged during the 2015 season. Fyfe still had a strong season, kicking 17 goals and recording a career-high tackles (96). Fyfe represented Australia in the 2017 International Rules Series and was awarded the Jim Stynes Medal. (best player in the series). Fyfe missed out on the All-Australian Team, not even being named in the initial 40-man squad. He polled 15 votes at 2017 Brownlow Medal, finishing 11th. In July 2017, Fyfe signed a six-year contract extension with Fremantle – the longest contract extension in the club's history – tying him to the Dockers until 2023.

Fyfe was in career-best form at the start of the 2018 AFL season, playing a match-winning hand in a number of the club's early wins. This included a career-best 43 disposals against the Western Bulldogs and 14 clearances against Gold Coast. In his 150th senior appearance for Fremantle, Fyfe recorded 30 disposals, 2 goals, and 7 inside-fifties, along with earning a goal of the year nomination for his crafty snap against Carlton in the 57-point win. Fyfe suffered a hamstring injury in Fremantle's Round 15 clash against the Brisbane Lions, hobbling off in the first quarter, and resulting in him spending six weeks on the sidelines. Fyfe returned in Fremantle's Round 22 clash against Geelong, recording 37 disposals and 7 clearances, despite the best on ground performance, Geelong demolished Fremantle by 133 points. Fyfe once again missed the All-Australian Team, not making the 40-man squad.

=== 2019–2021: Career-best form and second Brownlow Medal ===
Fyfe started the 2019 AFL season strongly, recording 32 disposals, 8 inside-fifties, and 10 clearances in Fremantle's Round 1 clash against North Melbourne, Fyfe followed up that performance with a similar one the next week, recording 31 disposals and 9 clearances. Fyfe continued this form throughout the season and was considered as being one of the favourites to win the Brownlow Medal. Fyfe finished the season with a career-high disposals (583) and a career-high average, increasing his disposal average to 29.2. Fyfe made the 2019 All-Australian Team, his first time making it since 2015, and was named Captain of the team for the first time in his career. Fyfe won his second Brownlow Medal, becoming a dual Brownlow Medallist, and becoming the 15th player in VFL/AFL history to win it twice, Fyfe polled a career-high votes (33), beating out the runner-up Patrick Dangerfield by 6 votes (27 votes).

After a good start to the 2020 season, which was impacted by the COVID-19 pandemic, Fyfe suffered a minor hamstring injury in Round 4 against Gold Coast. He went on to only miss one match, returning in Fremantle's comeback win against St Kilda to be among the best players with two goals; however, Fyfe strained the same hamstring at training a few days later, and was expected to miss several matches, before returning in Fremantle's upset win over Collingwood in Round 9.

Fyfe played almost half of the 2021 AFL season before being side lined for three games after injuring his shoulder in Fremantle's Round 12 clash against the Western Bulldogs. Round 17 saw Fyfe play his 200th game, he was arguably best on ground collecting 31 disposals and kicking a goal in Fremantle's 62-point victory over Hawthorn. Fyfe had his season cut short when he reinjured his shoulder in Fremantle's Round 19 game against Sydney.

=== 2022–2025: Relinquishing captaincy, injury and retirement ===
Fyfe missed the first half of the 2022 AFL season after an off-season shoulder operation impacted his pre-season. Fyfe made his return to football through the WAFL playing for Peel Thunder, Fyfe's first WAFL appearance since the 2010 AFL season. He made his AFL return during Fremantle's round thirteen game against Hawthorn. Fyfe was among Fremantle's best in round 17 during the 41 point win over St Kilda at Marvel Stadium, kicking an equal game-high 3 goals and collecting 21 disposals. Fyfe suffered a hamstring injury during Fremantle's round nineteen game against Richmond which saw him sidelined for the next three games, he made his return during Fremantle's round 23 clash against Greater Western Sydney. Fyfe was expected to partake in Fremantle's finals campaign but another hamstring injury sustained during training on the opposite leg of his previous hamstring injury saw him ruled out for the remainder of the season. On the 7th of February 2023, Fyfe relinquished captaincy of the Club after six seasons as captain. On the 1st of June 2023, it was announced that Fyfe had signed a two-year deal with Fremantle to keep him at the Dockers until the end of 2025.

Fyfe spent the 2023 pre-season training exclusively as a forward, with expectations he'd play a hybrid role as a midfielder/forward. He made his forward debut in the opening round of the 2023 AFL season against St Kilda, collecting nine disposals and kicking a point. Fyfe was a late withdrawal from Fremantle's round two game against North Melbourne due to a foot injury. He made his return in round eight during Fremantle's 69-point thumping over Hawthorn at Optus. Fyfe entered the game in the third quarter as the substitute, and kicked a goal in the final quarter. He would string together some consistency playing the next six consecutive games before injuring his foot again in round 16, ending his season for good.

Fyfe had a strong pre-season leading into the 2024 AFL season, which included a trip to India. He made his return from injury against the Brisbane Lions at Optus Stadium for Fremantle's opening game of the year. Fyfe played well collecting 21 disposals during the 23 point win. Fyfe continued his strong form throughout the early rounds, quickly re-establishing himself as a key figure in Fremantle’s midfield-forward rotation. In Round 7, he produced a vintage performance against the Western Bulldogs, amassing 37 disposals, 10 score involvements, and seven clearances in a best-on-ground display that drew comparisons to his Brownlow Medal-winning years. He played 22 games across the season, missing only one match in Round 21 due to a suspension for striking during the Round 20 Western Derby. Despite the brief setback, Fyfe’s 2024 campaign marked a significant return to consistency and leadership, as he played a vital role both on-field and off-field, mentoring younger teammates and helping steer Fremantle toward a competitive season.

On 11 August 2025, Fyfe announced that he would be retiring at the end of the 2025 AFL season. Fyfe's final match was in an elimination final against the Gold Coast Suns, with the Dockers losing by a point.

== Statistics ==
Legend
G	Goals	K	Kicks	D	Disposals	T	Tackles
B	Behinds	H	Handballs	M	Marks
±	Won that season's Brownlow Medal

Season	Team	No.	Games	Totals							Averages (per game)							Votes
Season	Team	No.	Games	G	B	K	H	D	M	T	G	B	K	H	D	M	T	Votes
2010	Fremantle	13	18	14	14	173	117	290	82	54	0.8	0.8	9.6	6.5	16.1	4.6	3.0	5
2011	Fremantle	7	21	18	14	253	274	527	111	85	0.9	0.7	12.0	13.0	25.1	5.3	4.0	13
2012	Fremantle	7	11	4	3	157	100	257	44	41	0.4	0.3	14.3	9.1	23.4	4.0	3.7	14
2013	Fremantle	7	22	18	13	339	230	569	98	74	0.8	0.6	15.4	10.5	25.9	4.5	3.4	18
2014	Fremantle	7	20	24	10	260	279	539	79	94	1.2	0.5	13.0	14.0	27.0	4.0	4.7	25
2015	Fremantle	7	20	17	14	275	301	576	84	86	0.9	0.7	13.8	15.1	28.8	4.2	4.3	31^{±}
2016	Fremantle	7	5	9	2	47	70	117	21	26	1.8	0.4	9.4	14.0	23.4	4.2	5.2	4
2017	Fremantle	7	21	17	13	236	319	555	95	96	0.8	0.6	11.2	15.2	26.4	4.5	4.6	15
2018	Fremantle	7	15	11	11	204	226	430	70	60	0.7	0.7	13.6	15.1	28.7	4.7	4.0	16
2019	Fremantle	7	20	16	13	279	304	583	96	79	0.8	0.7	14.0	15.2	29.2	4.8	4.0	33^{±}
2020 (Note: The 2020 season was played with 17 home-and-away matches per team (down from 22) and 16-minute quarters with time on (down from 20-minute quarters with time on) due to the impact of the COVID-19 pandemic.)	Fremantle	7	14	10	6	130	170	300	43	41	0.7	0.4	9.3	12.1	21.4	3.1	2.9	10
2021	Fremantle	7	15	6	21	154	207	361	58	61	0.4	1.4	10.3	13.8	24.1	3.9	4.1	3
2022	Fremantle	7	7	6	4	37	69	106	20	20	0.9	0.6	5.3	9.9	15.1	2.9	2.9	0
2023	Fremantle	7	9	3	2	52	73	125	23	22	0.3	0.2	5.8	8.1	13.9	2.6	2.4	0
2024	Fremantle	7	22	5	6	139	288	427	53	51	0.2	0.3	6.3	13.1	19.4	2.4	2.3	3
2025	Fremantle	7	8	0	0	17	31	48	9	6	0.0	0.0	2.1	3.9	6.0	1.1	0.8	0
Career			248	178	146	2752	3058	5810	986	896	0.7	0.6	11.1	12.3	23.4	4.0	3.6	190

== Honours and achievements ==
Team

- AFL minor premiership/McClelland Trophy (Fremantle): 2015

Individual

- Fremantle captain: 2017–2022
- 2× Brownlow Medal: 2015, 2019
- 2× Leigh Matthews Trophy: 2014, 2015
- 3× All-Australian team: 2014, 2015, 2019 (c)
- 3× Doig Medal: 2013, 2014, 2019
- 4x Fremantle Player's Award: 2014, 2015, 2017, 2019
- Jim Stynes Medal: 2017
- Fremantle 25 since 95 team
- Australia representative honours in international rules football: 2017
- All Stars representative honours in State of Origin for Bushfire Relief Match
- AFLCA best young player of the year: 2011
- AFL Rising Star nominee: 2010
