= Dustin Martin =

Australian rules footballer (born 1991)

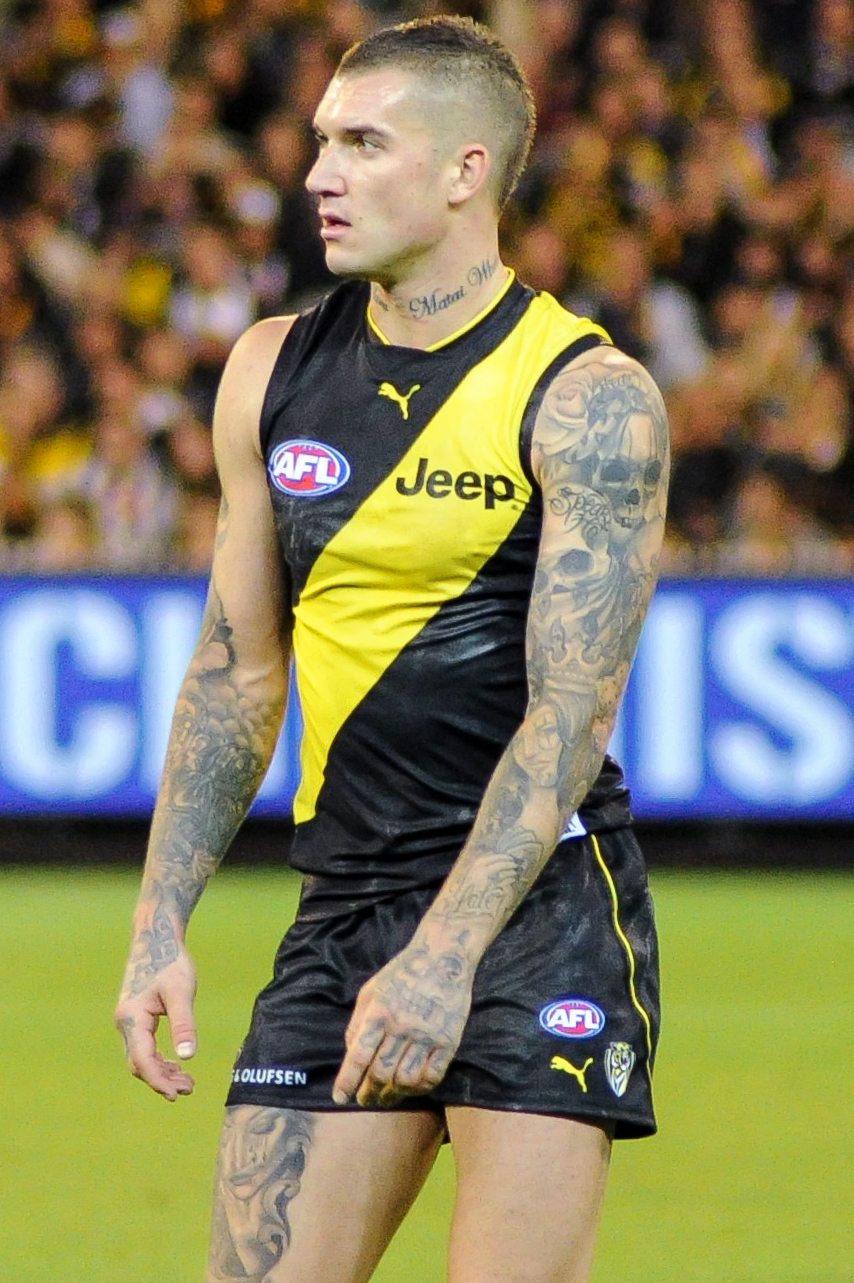
- Martin playing for Richmond in 2017

Personal information
- Full name: Dustin Martin
- Nickname: Dusty
- Born: 26 June 1991 (age 35); Castlemaine, Victoria
- Original team: Bendigo Pioneers (TAC Cup)
- Draft: No. 3, 2009 national draft
- Debut: Round 1, 2010, Richmond vs. Carlton, at the MCG
- Height: 187 cm (6 ft 2 in)
- Weight: 93 kg (205 lb)
- Position: Midfielder / forward

Playing career
Years	Club	Games (Goals)
2010–2024	Richmond	302 (338)

Representative team honours
Years	Team	Games (Goals)
2020	Victoria	1 (2)

Career highlights
- 3× AFL premiership player: 2017, 2019, 2020; 3× Norm Smith Medal: 2017, 2019, 2020; Brownlow Medal: 2017; Leigh Matthews Trophy: 2017; AFLCA champion player of the year: 2017; 4× All-Australian team: 2016, 2017, 2018, 2020; 3× Gary Ayres Award: 2017, 2019, 2020; 2× Jack Dyer Medal: 2016, 2017; State of Origin for Bushfire Relief Match best on ground: 2020; 2× Yiooken Award: 2016, 2017; AFL Rising Star nominee: 2010

Dustin Martin (born 26 June 1991) is a former professional Australian rules footballer who played for the Richmond Football Club in the Australian Football League (AFL). Martin was drafted by Richmond with the third pick in the 2009 national draft, and made his AFL debut in the opening round of the 2010 season. He is regarded as one of the greatest players of all time and considered by many to be the greatest finals player of all time.

Martin won the Jack Dyer Medal as Richmond's best and fairest player in 2016, along with his first All-Australian selection. He has won three premierships, two Jack Dyer Medals and four All-Australian selections among other individual accolades, and also won several major best-on-ground awards. In each of his three premiership years, he won the Norm Smith Medal as best afield in the grand final (Martin is the only player to win the award three times) and the Gary Ayres Award as the player of the finals series.

In 2017, Martin had what was described by AFL legend Leigh Matthews as the greatest-ever individual season by a VFL/AFL player. Despite constant speculation over his playing future, Martin won the league's highest individual honour, the Brownlow Medal, with a record 36 votes, as well as a premiership and the Norm Smith Medal, becoming the first player to win all three in a single season. He also won numerous other accolades, including the Leigh Matthews Trophy, the AFLCA champion player of the year award and his second Jack Dyer Medal.

== Early life and junior football ==
Martin was born in Castlemaine, Victoria, to a Māori father, Shane Martin, and an Australian mother, Kathy Knight. His father has family connections to the Ngāti Maru tribe on New Zealand's north island. Martin is one of three boys, alongside brothers Tyson and Bronson.

Martin first took up football at age six, learning the sport with the local Auskick program. He would also play regularly with his brothers on their self-constructed field in one of the paddocks at his family's three acre home in Yapeen. From there he played junior football for Campbell's Creek, before spending time with the Bendigo Pioneers under 15 squad.

His parents separated when he was 14 and Martin moved to Sydney with his father, leaving school at Castlemaine Secondary College after Year 9 and taking up full-time work. He worked various roles at his father's transport business including as a forklift driver while also assisting his father's girlfriend's sports apparel business. In total he worked regular twelve hour days, later saying he hated "working long days" in what was "not a very good job." While in Sydney he continued to play football, starting off with the Ingleburn Magpies Junior Australian Football Club's under 16 side. He stayed for just four matches however, dominating so comprehensively he was moved to the Campbelltown Football Club's under 18s team despite being aged only 15. He even played for the club's senior team on one occasion that year. At this time he enquired about joining the Sydney Swans junior academy, but found himself ineligible due to having not lived in Sydney for the required minimum three years.

I remember his power, his ability to surge and his skills on either side of the body. It seemed there was nothing he couldn't do.

— Francis Jackson, Richmond recruiting manager, on his memory of Martin aged 16

After a year in Sydney, Martin moved back to Victoria to live with his mother by late December 2007. He did not return to school however, instead working three days a week for a local electrical contractor before a short stint as stonemason. In addition to some time playing cricket as a fast bowler for Guildford, Martin returned to his goal of playing in the AFL. He trained with Castlemaine's senior side over his first summer back and within four matches had impressed enough to be asked back into the Bendigo Pioneer's junior program. He continued to play for Castlemaine for most of the season, winning the Bendigo Football League's rising star award that year. He also played four matches for the Pioneers TAC Cup team in a month that began to earn him the attention of AFL recruiters.

He returned to the Pioneers side the following year and became a stand-out player. Across 11 games with Bendigo, Martin would average 24.7 disposals and 9.7 contested possessions. He also ranked first at the club for disposals, contested possessions, clearances, inside-50s and score assists despite playing so few games, and placed second at the club's best and fairest awards night. Martin went on to be named at centre in the TAC Cup's team of the year.

At an earlier age, Martin was overlooked for state representative football, missing out on the 2007 under-16 national championships as well as at the under-18 carnival the next year. Martin did, however, play for Victoria Country in the 2009 AFL Under 18 Championships, averaging 21.4 touches, 7.2 contested possessions and 0.8 goals in the five games he played. In the final match of the competition, he recorded 28 disposals and five clearances against Western Australia. He was rewarded for his efforts at the championships with a selection at centre in the tournament's All-Australian team.

Martin gained the attention of AFL scouts from as early as 2008, with Sydney's recruiting boss Kinnear Beatson contacting Martin in an attempt to commit him to the club. This was on the back of a previous attempt to join the club's junior academy program. He was however just two months too young to qualify for that year's draft and remained ineligible for the Swans' academy program. When his draft year arrived in 2009 the Swans were again interested in drafting him, hoping he would fall to their selection at number six. That was on the back of an impressive draft camp at the Australian Institute of Sport in Canberra in October of that year. He recorded strong results at the camp, finishing equal second in the kicking efficiency test as well as running the 20 metre sprint in 2.89 seconds, the second fastest at the camp. He also placed seventh in the repeat sprints test and scored 14.3 on the beep test despite initial questions over his endurance ability. He was described at the time by The Age draft expert Emma Quayle as "a strong-bodied, strong-minded midfielder who keeps his feet, can slip tackles, kick with both feet and go forward to take a mark." When Richmond officials became certain Melbourne (who held picks number one and two in the draft) would select other players before Martin, they travelled to his Bendigo home to inform him that they would be certain to secure him with their pick.

== AFL career ==
=== 2010 season ===
Martin was drafted by Richmond with the club's first pick and third selection overall in the 2009 AFL draft.

He arrived at the club as an incredibly shy and underdeveloped personality, a fact that was noted by teammate Trent Cotchin who said though Martin was 18 "he seemed much younger in some of the ways he behaved." Indeed, he struggled initially to adjust to the expectations of professional football. In one incident in the 2010 pre-season he was removed from training and verbally reprimanded by club leadership when he was deemed unfit to train after a big night out. Despite these struggles, his on-field development was such that he would still debut in the 2010 season's opening match, a 56-point Richmond loss against Carlton at the MCG. Martin recorded the sixth most disposals of any Tiger (18) to go along with four marks, three tackles and three clearances. Two weeks later Martin was convicted by the AFL tribunal for a high hit on Sydney's Josh Kennedy in round 3. He did not receive a suspension for the incident however, returning to football the following week. After four matches Martin ranked fourth in the league for clearances and eighth for hard-ball gets. Media reports emerged after round 8 that the 18 year old Martin had received a significant contract offer from expansion club the Greater Western Sydney Giants. The offer, which the Herald Sun's Mark Robinson claimed to be worth $2.4 million over three seasons, would have taken effect in the new club's first AFL season in 2012. Martin later said he had never entertained the idea of moving to the start-up club. In round 10 he had gained attention for his on-field efforts again, this time being nominated for the 2010 AFL Rising Star award after a 21 disposal and 11 clearance match against Port Adelaide. Due to his previous tribunal conviction however, Martin was ruled ineligible for the award and thus did not officially place in the end of season award's points tally. He drew the attention of Sydney coach Paul Roos by round 14, prompting Roos to send veteran Brett Kirk onto Martin in a tagging role. Despite this extra attention, he still managed to record 18 disposals and a goal in the match at the MCG. After 17 rounds Martin ranked second at the club for clearances and inside-50s as well as third for disposals and contested possessions. At the same time he ranked first among that season's Rising Star nominees in clearances, contested possessions and inside-50s. He was also fourth for average disposals and fifth for average tackles. In round 19 he was rested by the club before returning to play out the final five matches of the season. He missed just that one game in his debut season and finished the year ranked second at Richmond for clearances and inside-50s, as well as third for both contested possessions and disposals. In addition to winning the Fred Swift Medal for fourth place at the club's best and fairest night, Martin also received six votes in the Brownlow Medal count that year, the most by any Richmond debutant since Craig Lambert in 1988. At season's end he reiterated his commitment to the club (and rejection of the former GWS overtures) by signing a two-year contract extension that would keep him at Richmond until the end of the 2013 season. The extension was reported by the Herald Sun to be in the vicinity of $400,000-a-year contract.

=== 2011 season ===
Ahead of his second season Martin switched playing numbers, losing 36 in favour of the number 4 Guernsey, one of the club's most famous. He told media members assembled at the announcement that he hoped to be the next Richmond man to win a premiership in the Guernsey, with it having been worn in each of the club's ten previous league premierships. Upon returning to training however he received markedly less praise from coach Damien Hardwick, who berated him for being out of shape and not sticking to his off-season training program. Any lingering effect had seemingly worn off by March though, as Martin returned straight back into the club's best-22 for the season's opening match. In round 5 the Daily Telegraph said Martin "single handedly destroyed" North Melbourne in his side's victory at Etihad Stadium. He kicked four goals and recorded 33 disposals in what was Richmond's first win of the season. Though it was his first career game with more than 30 disposals to his name, it wasn't even his last of the month, with Martin going to record 35 touches and a goal in a win over the Brisbane Lions the very next week. By then he had begun receiving comparisons to former Adelaide Brownlow Medallist Mark Ricciuto for his ball winning strength and his ability to kick goals in a midfielder's role. Fairfax Media's Jake Niall also went so far as to suggest that Martin should be in consideration for All Australian selection that year, despite it being just his second season at AFL level. On the back of this newfound praise and his previous two matches, Martin received the extra attention of a tag in round 7's match-up with Fremantle. Martin later spoke of seeking advice from teammates Nathan Foley and Trent Cotchin on learning how to break free of a tag. After 11 rounds Martin ranked tenth in the league for total kicks and fifth for handball receives. In addition he was ranked 10th in the league for score involvements at 29 per cent. Later that season he would have his best single-game goalkicking performance when he booted five majors against Brisbane in a round 13 victory at the Gabba.

Martin did not miss a match in 2011, finishing the year ranked third at the club for goals kicked with a total of 33 over his 22 matches. He also ranked third for disposals, second for inside-50s and fourth for total clearances. Martin doubled his previous year's Brownlow Medal vote tally to 12 and also improved upon his Jack Dyer Medal standing, placing third at the club's best and fairest night and receiving the Maurie Fleming Medal as a result.

=== 2012 season ===
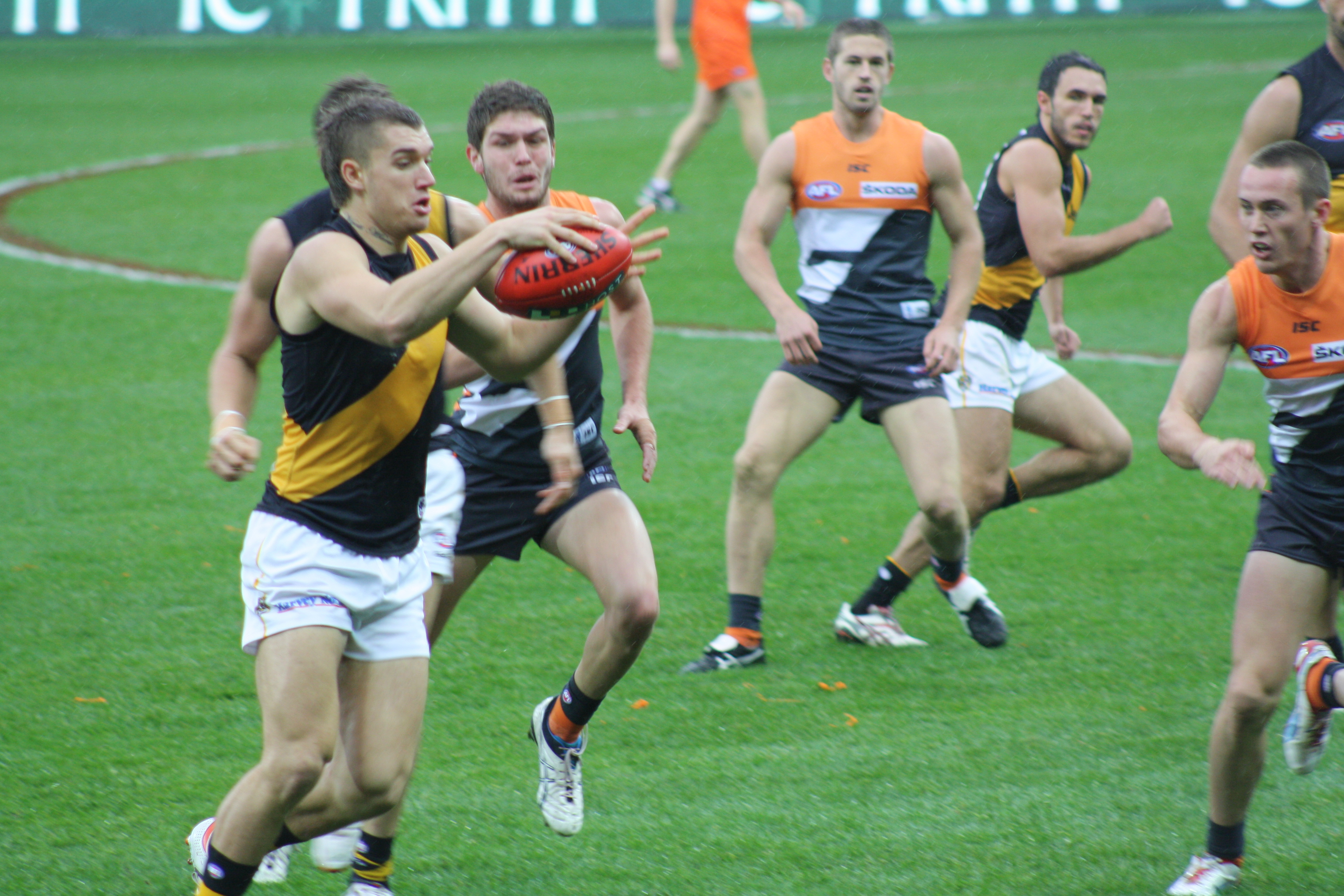
Dustin Martin takes on GWS defenders during Round 12 in 2012

Coming into the 2012 season, Martin was fitter than he had ever been before, placing sixth in the club's 3.8 kilometre run around Melbourne's Tan track. He started the season proper out strongly too, scoring two goals and adding 16 disposals in round 1's loss to Carlton. In round 5 he received his only best-on-ground recognition of the year, picking up the maximum three Brownlow Medal votes with his two goals and 26 disposals in Richmond's loss to West Coast. Four weeks later he notched his first 30-plus disposal match of the year, raking in 32 touches along with two goals in a win over eventual grand finalists Hawthorn. On 3 July 2012, Martin and teammate Daniel Connors missed a mandatory training session at the club. According to a statement released by Richmond, the pair had overslept after taking sleeping tablets the night before, medication that had been prescribed only to Connors. Martin also admitted to having been drinking alcohol that night. The club said both had failed to uphold team standards and Martin was suspended for two matches for the incident. Meanwhile, Connors, who was on a final warning for indiscretions under coach Hardwick, was sacked. Martin returned to AFL football in round 17 after concluding what captain Chris Newman labelled a "mini-pre-season" in which he completed multiple dawn training sessions. Martin played in each of the club's seven remaining matches that season and recorded 20 more disposals in five of those matches. Martin placed tenth in the club's best and fairest count that year, his lowest finish to date. He ranked sixth at the club for contested possessions and disposals as well as fifth in clearances.

=== 2013 season ===
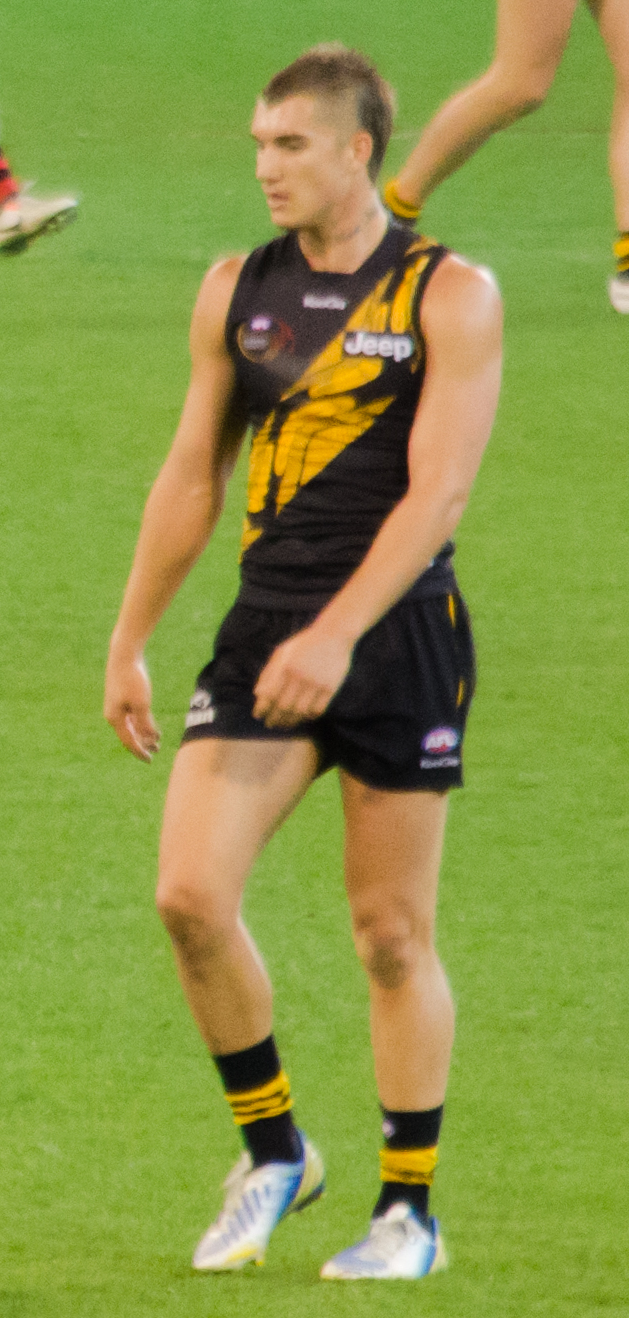
Martin playing against Essendon in round 9, 2013

Rumours concerning possible off-field misconduct circulated during the 2013 pre-season to the point where they became the dominant talking-point for Richmond players and staff during the summer. Former captain Chris Newman refused to address questions concerning the negative rumours, while coach Hardwick and new captain Trent Cotchin reiterated Martin's strong on-field pre-season preparations. In any case, Martin was at the same time taken under the wing of new Richmond assistant coach Mark Williams who was tasked with supporting Martin off-field and in building structure and life skills for Martin when away from the strict processes of the club itself. By the season's start Martin was in strong footballing form, arguably in his side's best players at half-time of both rounds 1 and 2. However, second half drop-offs saw his performances end disappointingly. In round 3 he turned in a complete four-quarter performance, lodging 35 disposals and seven inside-50s, and kicking two goals. He reached 30 disposals for a second time in round 7 before kicking three goals in the second half of a match against Melbourne in round 8 to help Richmond to their fifth win of the season. In round 12 he kicked a season best four goals in a win over Adelaide.

Between rounds 17 and 19, Martin turned in three consecutive games with more than 30 disposals, his first such stretch in his young career. At the end of round 19 Martin was averaging 24.5 disposals per game. By the end of the home and away season Martin had played in all of Richmond's matches, including its 15 wins. That total saw the club finish fifth in the league and qualify for its first finals series in 12 years. During an elimination final loss to Carlton, Martin recorded six inside-50s, a goal and 19 disposals in a 20-point knockout loss. He also attracted the ire of the league's head office after celebrating a goal with a handcuff gesture to the crowd. Martin was issued a $2,000 fine that was suspended for two years. He later revealed the gesture had been in support of a friend who was incarcerated at the time. Martin finished the year second to only captain Trent Cotchin in disposals at the club and posted the second most score involvements of any player in the league that season. In addition, he was selected in the inaugural AFL Players Association 22under22 team, an annual award recognising the best young talent in the AFL. He was at the same time chosen for the retrospectively selected 2012 team. Martin also recorded his best Brownlow Medal performance to date (16 votes) as well as his highest-yet finish at the club's best and fairest, securing the Jack Titus medal for second place.

Following the conclusion of Richmond's season, Martin began a highly publicised test of the market for his playing services as he came out of his second AFL contract. To that stage he had already rejected all of Richmond's early contract offers. On 13 September, Richmond issued a statement announcing Martin would be pursuing contract offers from other clubs. Six days later Martin was filmed by news media as he met with Greater Western Sydney officials and toured the club's training and administration facilities. The Giants ruled themselves out of pursuit of Martin the very next day however, leaving him with very few options other than Richmond. Melbourne, the other front-runner to secure him, had pulled out of the race the day prior. Around this time, media reports emerged suggesting the issue was primarily monetary, with Martin and his management rejecting Richmond's offer of roughly $500,000 per season in favour of a deal around $600,000 at another club. The day before a Richmond-imposed decision deadline was to expire, Martin met with Essendon officials and coaches to discuss a potential move. Despite the meeting, Martin would ultimately make the decision to stay with Richmond, signing a new two-year deal on 30 September.

=== 2014 season ===
Despite the contract stoush the year previous, Martin was welcomed back to the club with open arms by coach Hardwick, who lamented the public nature of the contract dispute but said Martin was "going to learn from his mistakes" and that he would "realise that (the club) is the place where he always wanted to be." Though the club started the year with a loss to the Gold Coast, round 2's victory over Carlton at the MCG saw Martin kick two goals and add 21 disposals. He was also reported for striking the Blues' Simon White in the third quarter of the match but was ultimately cleared due to what the AFL's Match Review Panel labelled insufficient use of force. In round 5 Martin kicked three goals in a win over the Brisbane Lions. Despite his impact and the club's recent scoring troubles, Hardwick ruled out a full-time move forward, saying Martin was too dynamic and too effective in the midfield to restrict him to a single role. Round 10's win over the GWS Giants saw Martin record a then career-best 36 disposals while two weeks later he added four goals in a losing match against North Melbourne. Though he had been trialed across half-back and up forward that season, it was at this point that Martin declared he wanted to become one of the elite midfielders of the competition. After 16 rounds Martin was showing real progress towards that end, averaging 27 disposals and having kicked 18 goals. What's more, he had been restricted to fewer than 20 disposals on just two occasions. By July, the Herald Sun's Jon Ralph said Martin was "maturing into one of the league's most damaging footballers." Champion Data statistics released in mid-August revealed Martin to be the league's best one-on-one player, winning 15 of his 27 contests that year. At 56%, his win rate more than doubled the league average of 26%. After seven straight wins saw Richmond go from cellar dwellers to finals contenders, a hamstring strain saw Martin miss the club's must-win match against St Kilda in round 22, his first miss through injury of his entire career to date. The club managed a win despite his absence and Martin returned for the round 23 win over Sydney that saw Richmond into the finals for a second straight season. A road trip elimination final against Port Adelaide would prove too much for his side however, as Martin recorded 29 disposals in the club's 57-point loss. After playing 22 matches that season Martin set a career-best mark for disposals for the second year running and finished second at the club for inside-50s. Though he did not make the final team, he received his first nomination to the All-Australian squad of 40 players and entered the club's best and fairest count as favourite to win. He ultimately received the Maurie Fleming medal by placing third in the award in addition to recording the second highest number of Brownlow Medal votes of any player at Richmond that year.

=== 2015 season ===
Martin avoided the contract intrigue that surrounded him two years earlier by signing a new two-year contract extension in February 2015, eight months before his current deal was to expire. Also prior to round 1, Martin was issued a challenged by coach Hardwick, to utilise his improved running capacity to play a majority midfield role as well as improving his contested ball winning and tackling in the mould of Essendon captain Jobe Watson. He got off to a slow start, however, kept to just 13 disposals thanks to a defensive tag by his Carlton opponents in round 1. Martin returned to his dominant best by round 2, though, gathering 31 disposals against the Western Bulldogs. He achieved the 30-plus-disposals mark on two more occasions in the next four weeks. In round 10, Martin was best-afield in Richmond's fourth straight win, recording 34 disposals, five tackles and a goal against Fremantle at Domain Stadium. After that match, which marked the midpoint of the season, Martin was in significant form and featured in the top-five Richmond players in 12 of 15 major statistical categories, including first place in both total disposals and total inside-50s. He had also lifted his contested possession (9.67 per game), tackle (4.0) and disposal (26.56) counts to career-high levels. He closed the season strongly, too, kicking four lots of three goals over the remaining 12 home and away matches. Richmond's 91-point victory over Collingwood in round 21 was marred by a crowd incident, though, in which Martin celebrated a goal by displaying an obscene finger gesture to members of the Collingwood cheer squad. He was ordered by the AFL to pay a $2,000 fine for the action, the same fine that was suspended for a crowd gesture in 2013. For the third straight season Martin's side qualified for the finals and for the third time were knocked out in an elimination final. This time Martin recorded 21 disposals in the 17 point loss to North Melbourne at the MCG. Martin topped the club for disposals and inside-50s in 2015 and again narrowly missed a club best and fairest, this time placing second behind defender Alex Rance. He also placed seventh in the Brownlow Medal tally in 2015, the best result of any Tiger that year. He posted a then-career best 21 votes, despite not polling for the first seven weeks of the season. Martin was again nominated to the All-Australian squad of 40 players but would fail to make final selection for the second-straight season.

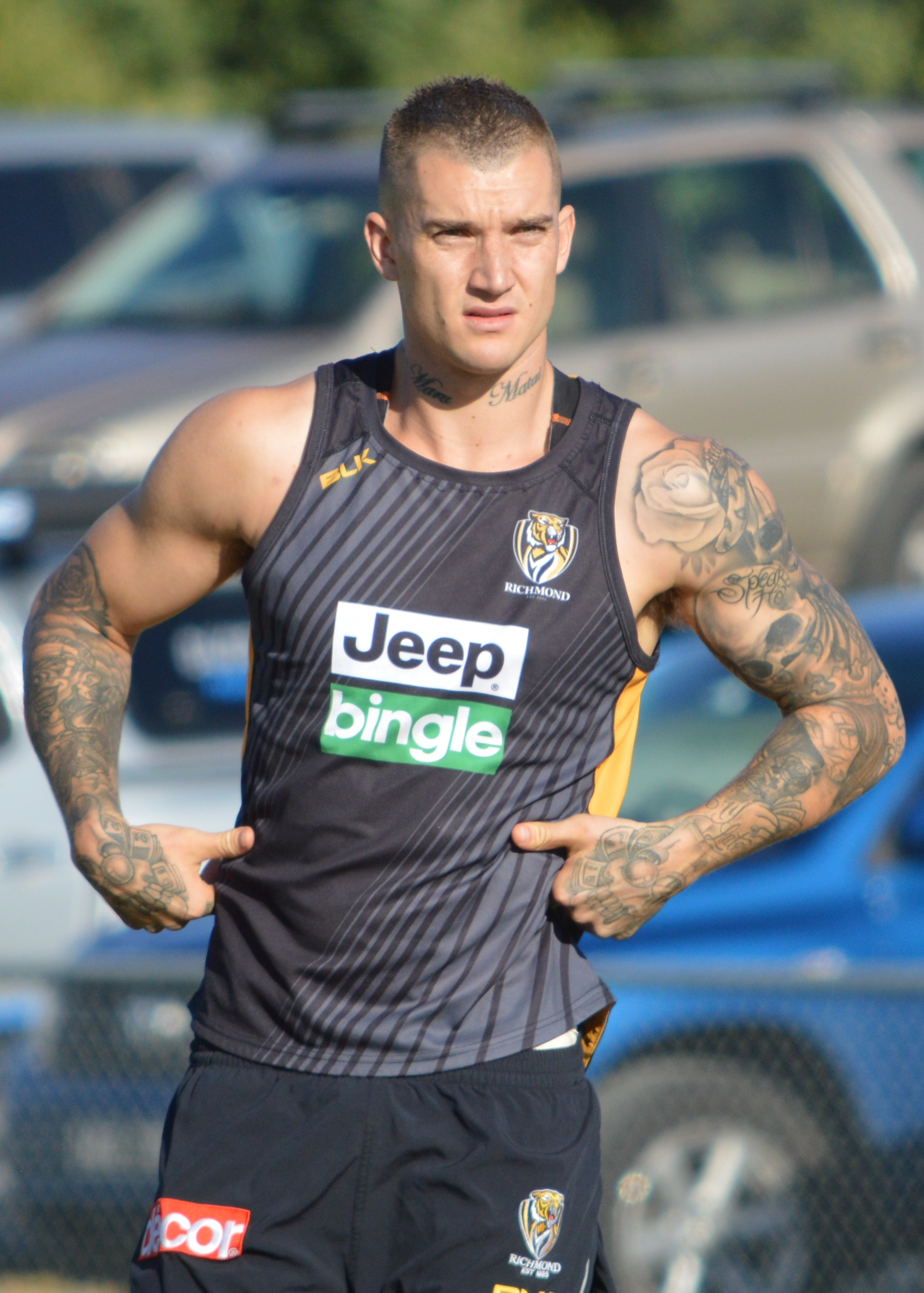
Martin at the Richmond Football Club's Family Day in December 2016

=== 2016 season ===
After seeing his reputation diminished by a tumultuous off-season in which he came under police investigation, Martin focused on making continual on-field improvements. He remained highly rated in the eyes of his peers though, placing 20th in a poll of all AFL players held to judge the best players in the league. Martin further impressed club officials by mid February, starring in an intraclub practice match. As his club started the season 1–6 on the wins table, Martin too looked less than his best. This despite 30-plus disposal matches (each with a goal too) in rounds 2 and 6. Richmond would find a patch of form beginning in round 8 however, as Martin turned in 28 disposals and a goal in an after-the-siren win over Sydney. In the Dreamtime at the 'G match in round 10 Martin was adjudged best-on-field and presented with the Yiooken Award for the first time in his career. He set a then-career-best mark with 38 disposals in that match. To that point he was averaging a career-best 27.5 disposals per game and led all Richmond players in pressure acts, a key defensive statistic. Martin repeated his recently set career best disposals mark on two occasions in the next five weeks, before setting a new best with 43 disposals in the round 17 re-match against Essendon. That effort saw him place third on the club's single game disposals record tally. Martin continued his prolific ball-winning ways until the end of the season, winning 30 or more disposals in five of his last six matches. Despite his stellar year Martin could not lift his side to another finals appearance, with the club winning just eight of their 22 matches that season. Martin received significant personal accolades however, gaining his first All-Australian selection after breaking the club record for most disposals in a single season. He also topped the club for inside-50s and contested possessions and placed only behind captain Trent Cotchin for clearances. His 113 clangers however topped all players in the league and set a new league record for clangers recorded in a single home and away season. Martin also received his first Jack Dyer Medal as Richmond's best and fairest player after beating the previous year's winner Alex Rance by a single vote. He was also the club's highest placed player at the Brownlow Medal and finished third overall in the count for the league's best and fairest player. His 25 votes saw him become the first player in Richmond's history to record more than 20 votes in back-to-back years of the award. After passing the 150 game mark in round 20, Martin was also awarded life membership status at Richmond.

=== 2017 season ===
A reinvigorated Richmond team opened the 2017 season with a 43-point victory over Carlton. In addition to introducing a new game-plan that included faster ball-movement and a greater commitment to tackling, the club also saw another leap from Martin, who put in a starring four-goal performance. He kicked another two goals the following week, but suffered a broken cheekbone in the win over Collingwood. He was ultimately given the medical all-clear to play the next week, despite speculation that he would sit out the match or at least play with a protective helmet. Martin did neither though and instead played a starring role in the rain-soaked match, recording 40 disposals, kicking two goals and gathering an equal-club-record 15 clearances in the victory over West Coast at the Melbourne Cricket Ground (MCG). He came under another injury cloud less than a fortnight later after a mid-week training session saw him leave the track with groin soreness. Though he did not miss a match as a result of the soreness, he was below his absolute best for much of the next month until he recorded 35 disposals in round 9's tight loss to the GWS Giants. In the annual Dreamtime at the 'G match that followed in round 10 Martin received the best-afield Yiooken Award for the second straight year. He followed that match up with another best-afield performance against North Melbourne that saw him record a maximum three Brownlow Medal votes in three consecutive matches leading into Richmond's mid-season bye. To that point Martin ranked top-10 in the league for disposals (29.9 per game), clearances (6.7) and contested possessions (14.5). He was also second best in the league for metres gained (564.4 per game) and behind only Patrick Dangerfield for goals scored by the league's top 20 possession winners. He was at this point also named in AFL Media's mid-season All Australian team.

He continued his roll into the second half of the season including receiving a maximum ten votes from Richmond's, and opponent Carlton's, coaches in round 14, to enter first place in the association's, champion player of the year award. The next week he set an AFL record by breaking eight attempted tackles by his Port Adelaide opponents that saw Richmond into the top-four teams on the ladder. He was at the point named the June player of the month by the AFL Players Association for performances between rounds 11 and 15. Despite being tagged, Martin turned in his second 40-plus disposal match of the season a fortnight later in Richmond's win over the Brisbane Lions. In addition, his 12 inside-50s was the equal second most recorded in a match by a Richmond player. He narrowly avoided suspension in that match however, instead receiving fines for two separate incidents of careless conduct in which he hit back at tagger Nick Robertson during the match. Martin was again awarded the AFLPA Player of the Month in July, becoming the first player to win the award in back-to-back months. When he received another nomination in August (one of six players each month), he became the only player to be nominated in every month in that year, the award's inaugural season. He continued his form in the final weeks of the season including in round 23, when he was awarded the Ian Stewart Medal as the best afield in Richmond's win over St Kilda at the MCG. Richmond finished the season having won 15 matches and earned a top-four finish for the first time in 16 years. At the end of the home and away season, his 667 disposals ranked third in the club's history. His 137 inside-50s and 144 clearances both placed second in the club's record books. At the same time, his 115 clangers broke his own club and league record set the previous season.

All year Martin had been plagued by yet another prolonged contract saga after his management announced the year prior that he would not be in a rush to sign a new deal. By the end of January he had confirmed he would delay a decision on a contract until the completion of the season. That would not stop speculation however, with news leaking of increasing offers as his form improved throughout the season to the point of him become one of the competition's best players. While Richmond opened negotiations with an offer believed to be worth close to $800,000 per year, North Melbourne soon emerged as a front-runner to secure him, with a six-year offer purported to be worth more than $6 million across the life of the deal. By July that offer had reportedly been matched by Richmond, forcing North Melbourne and other suitors to again up theirs. Essendon soon emerged as another suitor with a bid close to the mark set by North Melbourne. Negotiations came to a head in the pre-finals bye week, with Martin's camp finally ready to address the mounting contract offers. A final offer was presented by North Melbourne at a reported $1.5 million a season over seven years, while Richmond's offer sat significantly lower, at closer to $1.1 million. Martin spent the first part of the week in New Zealand where he discussed the offers with his father. Rumours began to circulate upon his return that Martin had made his mind up and would announce his decision on the following night's episode of The Footy Show. Martin ultimately forwent more than $2 million over the life of the deal when on Thursday 31 August he accepted Richmond's offer. A handshake agreement took place that afternoon in the home of Martin's agent Ralph Carr before he signed the deal officially in the days that followed. Though numerous media organisations had already run with the news in the hours previous, Martin officially announced his decision in a pre-recorded interview that aired on The Footy Show.

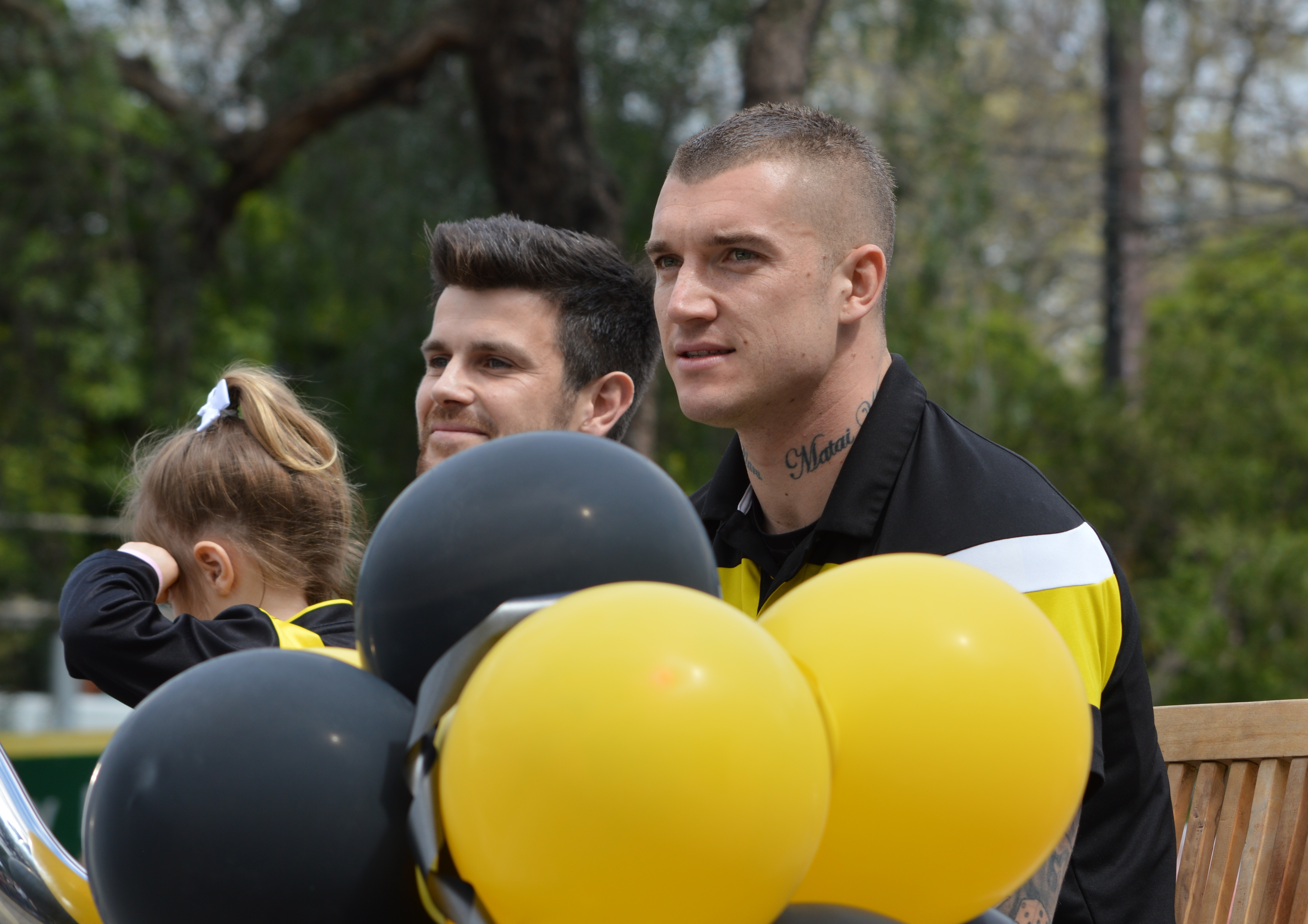
Martin with captain Trent Cotchin during the 2017 AFL Grand Final parade

With a new contract signed Martin and his Tigers entered the finals in a top-four match-up with Geelong at the MCG. It was to be his first finals win, turning in a 28 disposal and arguably best-on-ground performance to see Richmond through to its first preliminary final since 2001. He put in another strong performance in the match two weeks later, forgoing midfield minutes in favour of time up forward where he kicked three goals in his side's 36-point win over Greater Western Sydney. Before he could play in the grand final however, Martin was to face the spotlight off-field at the Brownlow Medal count to award the league's best and fairest player that season. He entered the night as an almost unbackable favourite to win the award on the back of ten matches where he was favourite to poll the maximum three votes. He ultimately recorded the maximum three votes on a record-breaking 11 matches and bested Patrick Dangerfield's 2016 sum to set a new record with 36 total votes to win the award. Dangerfield finished with the next most votes (33) but was ineligible to win after being suspended in July for a dangerous tackle against Carlton. As a result, Martin's runner-up Tom Mitchell finished a full 11 points behind with 25 votes total. Days later Martin would lead his team to a grand final match-up with minor-premiers Adelaide. After a tight first half, Richmond ran over the top of Adelaide in the second, securing a 37-year drought breaking premiership with a 48-point victory in front of more than one hundred thousand spectators at the MCG. Martin was best-on-field in the win, recording 29 disposals, a staggering 21 contested possessions and two goals. He was awarded the Norm Smith Medal as a result, and thus became the first player in league history to win the award and a premiership in the same year as receiving the Brownlow Medal.

At the end of the home and away season VFL/AFL legend Leigh Matthews had named Martin's 2017 season as the best by any player in the history of the game. By the end of the grand final it also become one of the most awarded. In addition to his premiership, his Brownlow Medal and his Norm Smith Medal, Martin also received both the Players Association and Coaches Association awards for player of the year, the former of which was named after Matthews himself. He was also recognised in numerous media awards as the season's best player including those from the Herald Sun, 3AW, SEN, Triple M and foxfooty.com.au. Martin received All-Australian honours for the second consecutive year as well as his second-straight Jack Dyer Medal as Richmond's best and fairest player. His spectacular final series was also recognised by the Coach's Association, earning him the first Gary Ayres Award as the player judged the best performer across the 2017 AFL finals series.

=== 2018 season ===
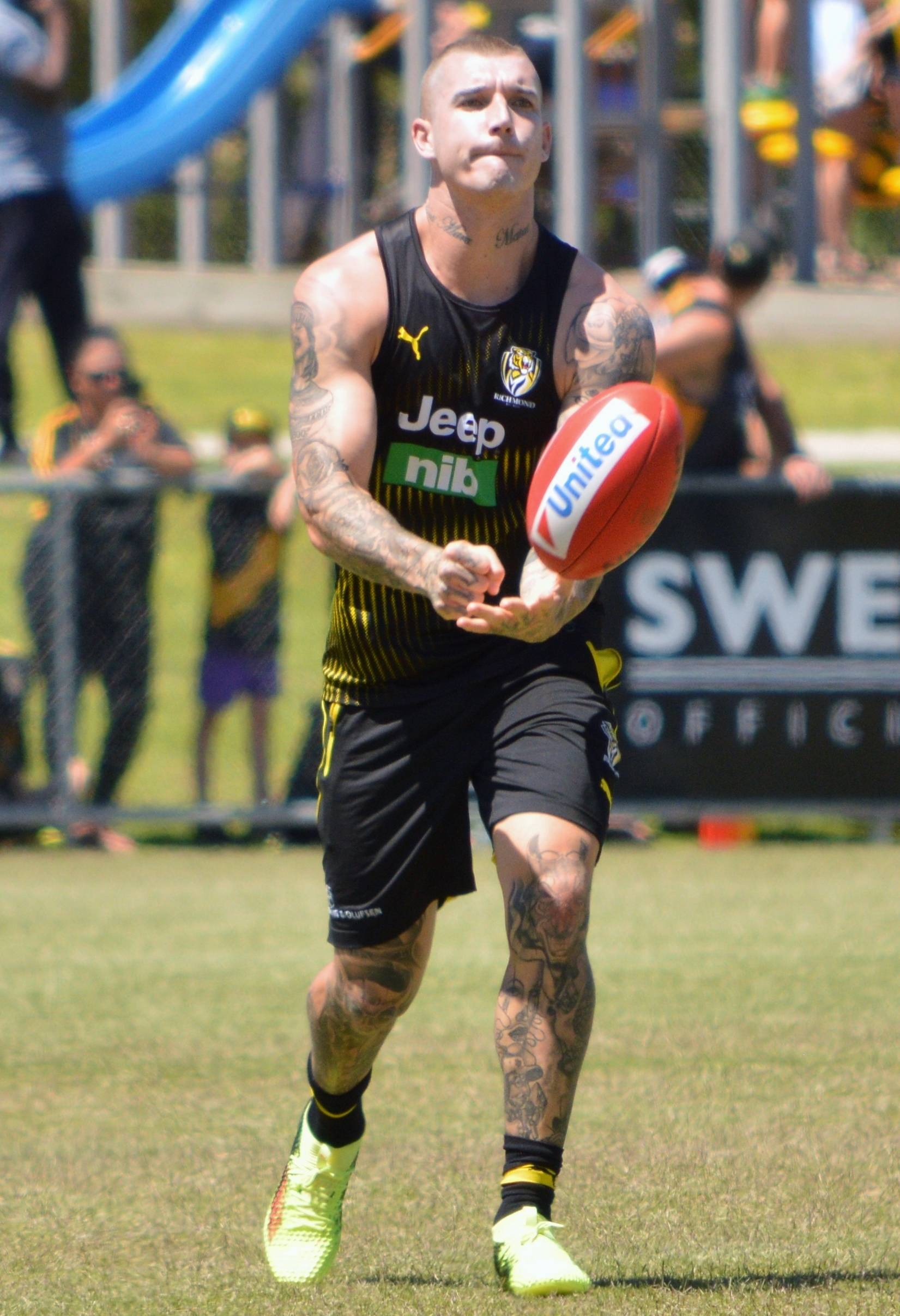
Martin handballs during a training drill in January 2018.

Martin entered 2018 as the best player in the league, according to a pre-season Players Association poll, up from 12th position at the same time the previous year. He trained at full strength during the off-season and played well in each of Richmond's two pre-season matches. In round 1 he was named in Richmond's best players by AFL Media for a performance that included 32 disposals and a goal. He added his second five-goal haul of his career the next week, in a loss to Adelaide at the Adelaide Oval. Martin would outdo that effort just a fortnight later, posting a new career-high total with six goals in a wet and rainy 93-point win over the Brisbane Lions. In round 6, he posted numerous game highs, including ten clearances, ten inside-50s and 605 metres gained, and he earned five votes as Richmond's second-best player behind only captain Trent Cotchin. After that match, Fox Footy reported that Martin had recorded just one of his 150 disposals that season in Richmond's defensive 50, with analyst Leigh Montagna explaining that Martin was tasked with attending centre bounces as a midfielder but would play forward of the ball at virtually all other points of the match. A fortnight later Martin was effectively tagged out of Richmond's win over North Melbourne by Ben Jacobs and managed only 16 disposals, his lowest total in more than a year. That match also marked the first time Martin had gone without scoring a goal or a behind since round 23, 2016. In round 10's win over St Kilda, Martin kicked two goals and was named as one of Richmond's best by AFL Media.

He followed his round 10 performance with 28 disposals and a goal in round 11's win over Essendon before sitting out of round 12's matchup with Port Adelaide due to a minor calf injury. To that point, it was just the fifth game Martin had missed due to injury or suspension in his AFL career and his first since round 22, 2014. Martin returned after just one match, contributing 22 disposals and a goal in Richmond's round 13 victory over Geelong. Later that week, Martin was named in Fox Footy's mid-year All Australian squad while also being named in the Herald Sun and AFL Media teams of 22 players. Following the bye, Martin kicked a game-high two goals and added 30 disposals in a win over Adelaide at the MCG. The following week he was adjust Richmond's best player in a loss to the Greater Western Sydney in which he received six coaches award votes. He repeated the effort in round 18, named by The Age as Richmond's best in a win over St Kilda. In round 19 he added three goals despite a strong tag from Collingwood's Levi Greenwood. Martin was again named by The Age as Richmond's best with a two-goal performance in round 22, a win over Essendon that saw the club secure the season's minor premiership. To that point Martin ranked first in the league for inside-50s and score involvements as well as second for centre clearances and seventh for goal assists recorded that season. At the end of the home and away season, Martin was named at rover in the AFL's Player Ratings team of the year, was nominated for the AFLPA's MVP award and earned his third straight All-Australian selection. He entered that year's Brownlow Medal count as bookmakers' second placed favourite and ranked first in AFL Media's Brownlow Predictor.

In the first week of the finals series, Martin played his 200th AFL match in a qualifying final victory over Hawthorn. He became the 29th Richmond player to achieve the milestone and the quickest to do so, having achieved the feat eight years and five months after his initial debut. He finished the match with 29 disposals, 10 clearances and a boundary line goal that The West Australian said would have been the goal of the year had it been kicked during the home and away season and what Fox Footy commentator Jonathan Brown labelled "one of the greatest finals goals you'll ever see". Media reports following that match suggested that Martin had suffered a corked thigh during play, a claim seemingly supported by Martin's limited training program the following week, but nonetheless continually denied by club officials at the time. Less than a week later the club reversed its position, revealing Martin had suffered a serious corked thigh on his kicking leg and was continuing to deal with the effects of bleeding on the knee. Despite the injury, Martin played in what would be a shock preliminary final loss to Collingwood which saw Richmond's season ended. He produced a significantly reduced output, finishing the match with just 19 disposals, six of which were kicks and represented his lowest kicking tally since round 23, 2013. Following the conclusion of the 2018 finals series, Martin was named by the Herald Sun's chief football writer Mark Robinson as the league's second best midfielder and the fourth best player overall, during the 2018 season. After winning the award in each of the previous two seasons, Martin placed third in the club's best and fairest count behind only Kane Lambert and eventual winner Jack Riewoldt.

=== 2019 season ===
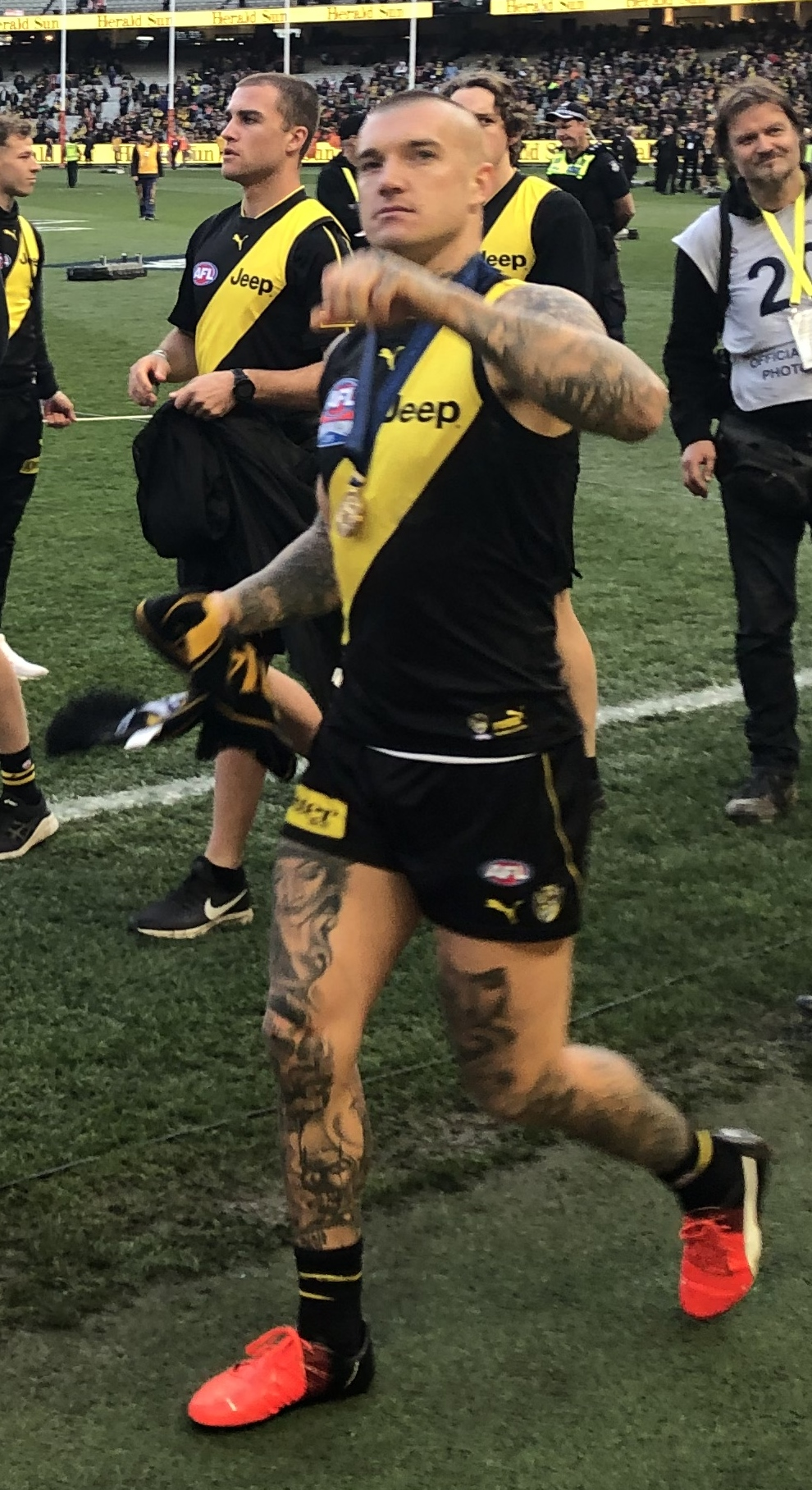
Martin celebrates winning the 2019 premiership.

According to media reports in November of the previous off-season, Martin was to captain one of four franchise-style AFLX teams in an upcoming pre-season tournament in 2019. Martin was replaced in the reported line-up by teammate Jack Riewoldt after seemingly removing himself from availability before the tournament concept was confirmed. Instead, he made his first footballing appearance of 2019 in each of Richmond's two pre-season matches in early March. In round 1 Martin was described by AFL Media as "solid, yet not spectacular" with 30 disposals and seven inside-50s in his club's 33-point victory over Carlton. The following week he was tagged effectively by Collingwood's Levi Greenwood and held to just 19 disposals in Richmond's round 2 loss to Collingwood. The strategy was repeated by the Giants in round 3, when Matt de Boer managed to restrict him to just 15 disposals. Martin was undisciplined in response, attracting an AFL fine and significant media scrutiny for an obscene gesture towards Giants ruck Shane Mumford and facing a Match Review report for an off-the-ball hit on defender Adam Kennedy. Initially, Martin was offered a two-week suspension for the incident, which the AFL's Match Review Officer classed as intentional conduct and high contact with medium impact to the head. Martin challenged the classification at the AFL Tribunal, where the impact was downgraded, with the suspension subsequently reduced to one match.

He was among Richmond's best players upon his return in round 5, kicking three goals and gathering 25 disposals after a tagging effort by Sydney's George Hewett saw him play long stints as forward. Martin was again subject to tagging in round 6, this time kept to 17 disposals and a single goal by Melbourne's Michael Hibberd. In round 9 Martin was spectacular, turning in a performance labelled my multiple media outlets as evocative of his best from his 2017 Brownlow-winning season. He recorded 13 disposals and four clearances in the first quarter of the win, before finishing the match with 37 disposals, 10 clearances and two goals. He earned 10 Coaches Award votes that match and was named in AFL Media's Team of the Week, a feat he repeated after 25 disposals and eight clearances in round 10. For the second time that season, Martin kicked three goals in round 11's loss to North Melbourne.

In round 13, injuries to captain Trent Cotchin, vice-captains Jack Riewoldt and Alex Rance as well as to early-seasons stand-in captain Shane Edwards saw Martin called upon to captain Richmond for the first time in his career. He performed well with 32 disposals, nine marks and two goals, earning a club-best three coaches votes despite an eventual loss to Adelaide in that match, the last before the club's mid-season bye. At that point he held averages of 25.3 disposals and 1.1 goals per game and was labelled by AFL Media as a mid-season contender for a fourth-straight All-Australian selection. Martin was exceptional again following the bye, earning three Brownlow votes and the Ian Stewart Medal for best-on-ground with a game-high 36 disposals and six clearances against St Kilda in round 15. Martin was named to AFL Media's Team of the Week in rounds 18 and 19 after recording a personal season-high 38 disposals in the latter of those two matches. His seven coaches award votes also saw him move into 18th place on the award's leaderboard. He bested that mark with nine votes as best afield with 34 disposals and 11 inside-50s in round 20's win over Melbourne, again earning Team of the Week honours. Martin suffered general soreness and was a late withdrawal from the following week's match, before returning with what multiple media outlets labelled one of the best performances of his career in round 22's win over West Coast. In addition to a game-high 35 disposals and 818 metres gained, Martin set a new career-best with 13 inside-50s, which was also the most by any player in the league in a match that season.

At the end of the home-and-away season, Martin was named in the squad of 40 players for the All-Australian team but missed out on selection to the final 22. Martin was, however, named to the best 22 in The Age chief football reporter Jake Niall's and the Herald Sun chief football reporter Mark Robinson's teams of the year—along with selection in the AFL's Player Ratings team of the year—and also placed equal 11th overall in the coaches association player of the year award. Martin's 23 Brownlow Medal votes saw him finish equal sixth (though officially ineligible due to suspension) and saw him pass Kevin Bartlett for the record for most votes by a Richmond player in club history. In Richmond's first final, Martin was a stand-out best on ground, kicking a career-high six goals in a 47-point qualifying final victory over the Brisbane Lions. That tally was the most by any Richmond player in a final since Bartlett in the 1980 grand final. In the preliminary final win over Geelong a fortnight later, Martin recorded 22 disposals and two goals, restricted somewhat by a knock to the leg suffered in the match's first quarter. For the second time in three seasons, Martin was a premiership player and again Norm Smith Medalist as best on ground when his Richmond side defeated Greater Western Sydney in the grand final the following week. Martin kicked four goals and recorded 22 disposals to be unanimously selected for the Norm Smith medal. In doing so, he became just the fourth player in AFL/VFL history to win the award twice. Martin also repeated his feat of 2017 in again receiving the Gary Ayres Award as the player of the finals series, and placed sixth in the club's best and fairest count. At the end of the season and finals series, Martin was ranked by Champion Data as the league's fourth-best player that year, while Herald Sun chief football reporter Mark Robinson ranked Martin number one on his list of the league's best players in 2019.

=== 2020 season ===
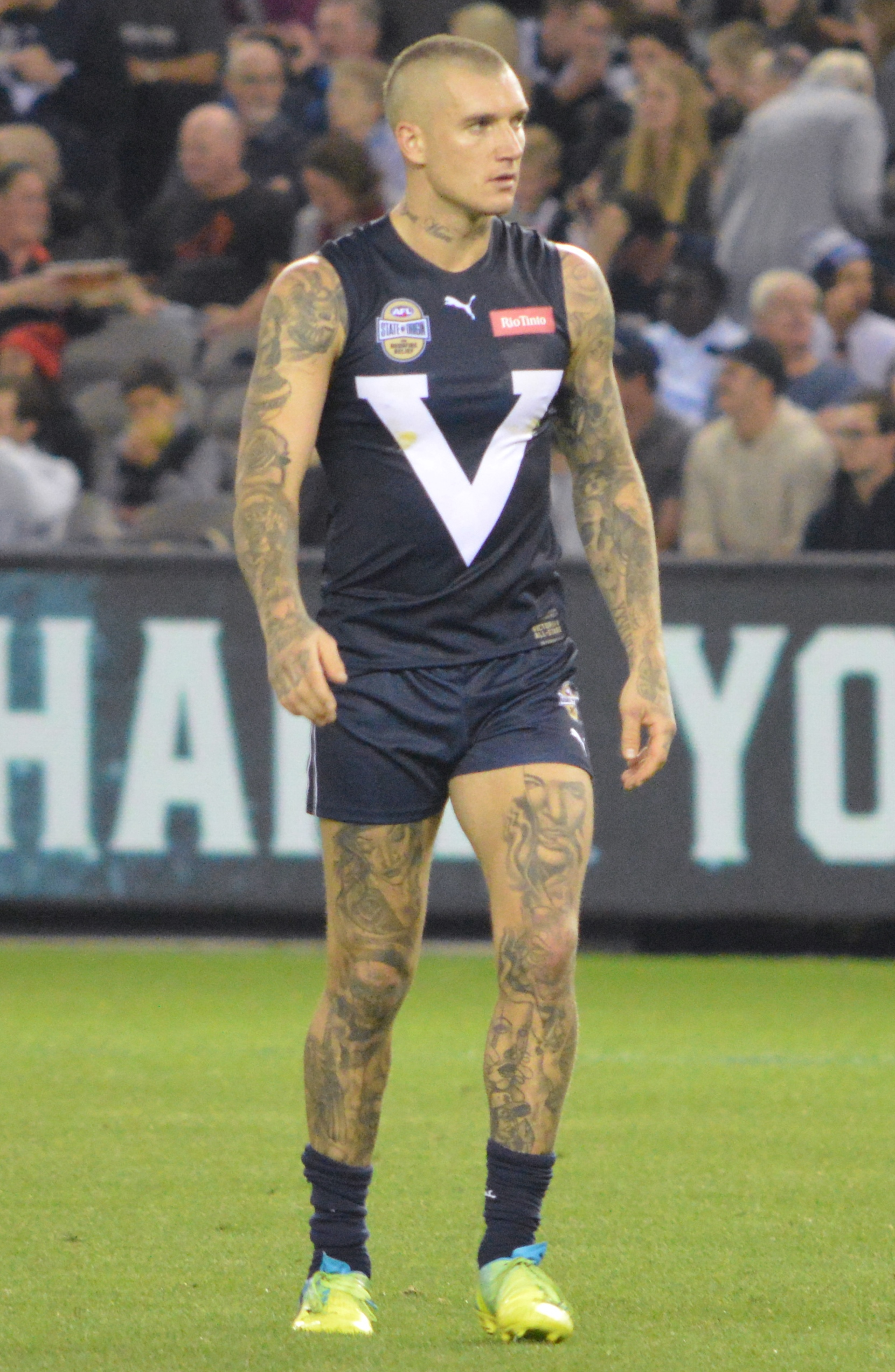
Martin during the 2020 State of Origin for Bushfire Relief Match

Martin returned to pre-season training in the first week of December 2019 and was labelled a certain selection for representative honours by Richmond and Victoria coach Damien Hardwick when the league announced a State of Origin exhibition match for bushfire relief fundraising was to be held in February. Martin contributed the standout performance of that match, helping Victoria to a victory over the All-Stars with a two-goal and 23 disposal showing that saw him awarded the Best on Ground medal. He sat out Richmond's first pre-season match that same weekend but returned in fine form for the final practice match against Greater Western Sydney a week later. Despite an uninterrupted pre-season, the rapid progression of the coronavirus pandemic into Australia by mid-March saw the future of the season in doubt, including Martin and Richmond's premiership defence. The AFL commission eventually announced a shortened 17-round season would proceed as scheduled, but without fans in attendance due to public health prohibitions on group gatherings.

Martin contributed 24 disposals and a goal in a round 1 win over Carlton under those conditions, and like all matches that season, with match time reduced by one fifth in order to reduce the load on players who would be expected to play multiple matches in short periods with a compressed fixture in the later part of the year. Just three days later however, the AFL commission suspended the season after multiple states enforced quarantine conditions on their borders that effectively ruled out the possibility of continuing the season as planned. After an 11-week hiatus, Martin contributed 20 disposals in a round 2 draw with Collingwood in early June, before missing Richmond's round 3 loss to Hawthorn with minor rib bruising. He returned after one week away with 18 disposals in a loss to St Kilda and in early July, he traveled with the club when all Victorian sides were relocated to the Gold Coast in response to a virus outbreak in Melbourne.

He broke through a tag in round 7 to contribute two goals and 16 disposals, before kicking another two goals and adding a game-high 23 disposals in a round 8 loss to Greater Western Sydney for which he received seven coaches votes as the second best player of the match. Martin improved on that output against the Western Bulldogs the following week, collecting the full ten coaches votes for a dominant display with 26 disposals, eight inside-50s and three goals including one from deep in the forward pocket that was highlighted by Fox Footy as a contender for goal of the year. Following that match, Martin was named in the mid-year All-Australian teams of the Herald Sun, The Age and Fox Footy. He was among his side's bests with 24 disposals and seven coaches votes in a round 10 win over the Brisbane Lions before adding a season-best 30 disposals to earn nine votes as co-best on ground in the club's round 13 win over Essendon. Martin added a further five votes for a 28-disposal game in round 18, finishing the regular season with 42 coaches votes and earning 15th place in the award.

He was named in a fourth All-Australian team, and he earned a club-leading 15 Brownlow Medal votes to place equal fifth in the prestigious award. He had a relatively quiet start to the finals, going goalless and recording 18 disposals in a qualifying final loss to the Brisbane Lions in week one. In contrast, he was clearly best on ground in a semi-final win over St Kilda a week later, contributing game highs in inside-50s (10), clearances (six), score involvements (nine) and metres gained (597). Martin led all Richmond players with two goals and 21 disposals in the preliminary final victory over Port Adelaide in week three, earning his side yet another Grand Final appearance. He became a three-time premiership player the following week, lifting Richmond to a 31-point victory over Geelong with a match-high four goals. As with each of the previous two premierships, Martin was again best-on-ground, becoming the first player in league history to earn a third Norm Smith Medal. Likewise, he earned a third Coaches Association Gary Ayres Award as player of the finals, before receiving the Jack Titus Medal as second place in the club's best and fairest award.

=== 2021 season ===
Prior to the commencement of the 2021 season, Martin was once again named the number-one player in the game as part of the Herald Sun's annual pre-season list. After a full uninterrupted pre-season training period, Martin participated in both unofficial and official pre-season matches in February and March. Martin had a consistent season; however, he suffered a kidney injury when colliding with Brisbane midfielder Mitch Robinson in round 18, ruling him out for the rest of the season.

=== 2022 season ===
Martin made his comeback game in round 1 with a 21-disposal game with two goals, but he decided to take personal leave until round 8, posting a solid 23-disposal game that included two goals; he would follow this up with a game that earned him two Brownlow votes in round 9. However, a hamstring injury in round 16 again saw him sidelined, although he managed to rally to play in a losing elimination final against Brisbane.

=== 2023 season ===
Martin was named in the All-Australian Squad of 40 in his most productive season since 2020. He kicked 25 goals in a season and made several Best on Ground performances throughout the latter part of the year. In the penultimate game of the season, a farewell match for his great mates Trent Cotchin and Jack Riewoldt, Martin had 31 disposals and kicked three goals.

=== 2024 season ===
Martin struggled through the early part of the 2024 season as many within the AFL Media acknowledged that he was in the twilight of his career. Speculation around his retirement, as well as a move away from Richmond continued throughout the season as Martin refused to speak to the media.

Martin played in his 300th AFL game in Round 14 against Hawthorn at the MCG. A record 92,311 people showed up to acknowledge the milestone, and they were rewarded instantly with Martin kicking the first goal of the game. Hawthorn would go onto win easily, before Martin broke his media silence by completing an interview with former Premiership teammate Jack Riewoldt, confirming his want to play on for the remainder of the season. A tug of his guernsey may also have suggested he had no plans to leave the Richmond Football Club any time soon.

On 6 August, Martin announced his retirement.

== Player profile ==
Martin plays as a midfielder and a forward, often attending centre bounce contests as a midfielder before shifting to a forward role in the time between centre bounces. He is adept at playing a small full-forward role, and is consistently among the best players in the league at one-on-one win percentage when competing for the ball with a single direct opponent. He is notable for his core strength and famous 'don't argue', a fend-off technique that makes him notoriously difficult to tackle. He combines a unique ball-winning and long-kicking skill set, winning the second-most centre clearances of any player between 2017 and 2019, while gaining more meterage than any player who also gathered two or more centre clearances a game during that time.

In 2019, the Bendigo Advertiser labelled Martin "one of the greatest players in AFL history". The same year, the Herald Sun called Martin the "most devastating matchwinner in the competition". In 2020, Martin was labelled the best player in the game by Triple M commentators Ross Lyon, while he was called the greatest player of all time by Network 7 commentator Daisy Pearce. In the 2019/20 off-season, Martin was named as an onballer in The Age's honorary team of the 2010s and ranked third in the Herald Sun's list of the best players of the decade. In 2020, Martin was named by the Herald Sun as Richmond's best player of the AFL era, while The Age ranked him as the 13th-best player in the league during the same period. In 2020, Seven Network commentator Bruce McAvaney labelled Martin the greatest-ever Richmond player.

Since 2020, Martin has been lauded as one of the game's greatest-ever finals players, including by AFL Media, the Herald Sun, The Age and The Guardian.

== Statistics ==
Legend
G	Goals	K	Kicks	D	Disposals	T	Tackles
B	Behinds	H	Handballs	M	Marks
#	Played in that season's premiership team	†	Led the league for the season	±	Won that season's Brownlow Medal

Season	Team	No.	Games	Totals							Averages (per game)							Votes
Season	Team	No.	Games	G	B	K	H	D	M	T	G	B	K	H	D	M	T	Votes
2010	Richmond	36	21	11	6	210	215	425	50	70	0.5	0.3	10.0	10.2	20.2	2.4	3.3	6
2011	Richmond	4	22	33	14	311	175	486	78	72	1.5	0.6	14.1	8.0	22.1	3.5	3.3	12
2012	Richmond	4	20	23	23	257	190	447	63	60	1.2	1.2	12.9	9.5	22.4	3.2	3.0	5
2013	Richmond	4	23	23	32	382	175	557	110	63	1.0	1.4	16.6	7.6	24.2	4.8	2.7	16
2014	Richmond	4	22	27	15	385	175	560	108	56	1.2	0.7	17.5^{†}	8.0	25.5	4.9	2.6	13
2015	Richmond	4	23	24	13	400	197	597	103	89	1.0	0.6	17.4	8.6	26.0	4.5	3.9	21
2016	Richmond	4	22	9	9	427	257	684	99	80	0.4	0.4	19.4	11.7	31.1	4.5	3.6	25
2017^{#}	Richmond	4	25	37	29	479^{†}	265	744	103	88	1.5	1.2	19.2	10.6	29.8	4.1	3.5	36^{±}
2018	Richmond	4	23	31	21	362	221	583	86	50	1.3	0.9	15.7	9.6	25.3	3.7	2.2	19
2019^{#}	Richmond	4	23	32	15	377	223	600	96	56	1.4	0.7	16.4	9.7	26.1	4.2	2.4	23
2020^{#} (Note: The 2020 season was played with 17 home-and-away matches per team (down from 22) and 16-minute quarters with time on (down from 20-minute quarters with time on) due to the impact of the COVID-19 pandemic.)	Richmond	4	20	22	11	251	162	413	52	46	1.1	0.6	12.6	8.1	20.7	2.6	2.3	15
2021	Richmond	4	16	19	7	200	161	361	46	36	1.2	0.4	12.5	10.1	22.6	2.9	2.3	11
2022	Richmond	4	9	12	7	114	51	165	31	15	1.3	0.8	12.7	5.7	18.3	3.4	1.7	2
2023	Richmond	4	20	25	22	280	192	472	94	38	1.3	1.1	14.0	9.6	23.6	4.7	1.9	8
2024	Richmond	4	13	10	8	128	98	226	50	17	0.8	0.6	9.8	7.5	17.4	3.8	1.3	1
Career			302	338	232	4563	2757	7320	1169	835	1.1	0.8	15.1	9.1	24.2	3.9	2.8	213

== Honours and achievements ==
Team

- 3× AFL premiership player (Richmond): 2017, 2019, 2020
- AFL minor premiership/McClelland Trophy (Richmond): 2018

Individual

- 3× Norm Smith Medal: 2017, 2019, 2020
- Brownlow Medal: 2017
- Leigh Matthews Trophy: 2017
- AFLCA champion player of the year award: 2017
- 4× All-Australian team: 2016, 2017, 2018, 2020
- 3× Gary Ayres Award: 2017, 2019, 2020
- 2× Jack Dyer Medal: 2016, 2017
- Victoria representative honours in State of Origin for Bushfire Relief Match: 2020
- State of Origin best on ground: 2020
- 2× Yiooken Award: 2016, 2017
- AFL Rising Star nominee: 2010

== Personal life ==
=== Chopstick incident ===
In December 2015, Martin was accused of making threats to stab a woman with a chopstick after she asked him to be respectful of other diners at the Mr. Miyagi Japanese restaurant in Windsor in Melbourne's inner-south-east. The woman in question contacted Richmond to complain two days after the alleged incident occurred on the night of 5 December. According to her allegations, Martin had been drunk, loud and offensive and when confronted, threatened to stab her in the face with a chopstick. In addition, she claimed Martin had slammed his hand into the wall next to her head when she threatened to contact the club about the incident. A joint statement released by Martin and Richmond in the days that followed acknowledged he had been drunk and acting disruptively and that he had telephoned the woman to offer an apology for any offence he had caused, an apology which was ultimately accepted.

A police investigation into the incident followed, but it was dropped within a fortnight after the woman in question declined to make an official statement. A police spokesperson said an extensive investigation had taken place and that "After reviewing CCTV footage and speaking to all parties involved, including numerous independent witnesses at the restaurant on the night, investigators determined that no criminal offence took place." A further investigation was launched by the AFL in the month that followed and further cleared Martin of making any threat to kill or other such criminal action. In a statement, the league said, "There is no evidence to support the allegation that Dustin Martin physically threatened the complainant." Martin ultimately received no criminal or league-imposed sanction for the alleged incident, but his club fined him $5,000 for public drunkenness and inappropriate public behaviour. The club chose to suspend the fine considering the massive reputational damage the ultimately unfounded incident had inflicted upon him.

=== Mental health ===
In a feature article for The Age's Executive Style magazine in March 2019, Martin revealed he had suffered from anxiety and depression in 2018. He described an empty feeling after achieving his professional goals in his extraordinary 2017 season.

=== Ambassadorial roles ===
In 2018, Martin became the new face of Bonds underwear. At the same time, he signed a new four-year contract extension to become the first Australian on a multi-year personal sponsorship deal with European sportswear brand Puma. That deal was terminated by Martin in April 2019, however, after the brand stopped offering his preferred playing shoe. Martin has also done promotions with Foxtel and Bang & Olufsen since the end of the 2017 season. In 2025, Martin became an ambassador for luxury car dealership Cavalo Prestige and men's skincare brand Trademark Skin.

=== Other issues ===
In 2022, a video from 2015 of Martin groping a woman surfaced on social media, with the AFL investigating the incident.
