= 2018 All-Australian team =

Australian Football League team

The 2018 Virgin Australia All-Australian team represents the best performed Australian Football League (AFL) players during the 2018 season. It was announced on 29 August as a complete Australian rules football team of 22 players. The team is honorary and does not play any games.

== Selection panel ==
The selection panel for the 2018 All-Australian team consisted of chairman Gillon McLachlan, Kevin Bartlett, Luke Darcy, Danny Frawley, Steve Hocking, Glen Jakovich, Chris Johnson, Cameron Ling, Matthew Richardson and Warren Tredrea.

== Team ==
=== Initial squad ===
The initial 40-man All-Australian squad was announced on 27 August. Minor premiers Richmond had the most players selected in the initial squad with eight, while Gold Coast and St Kilda were the only clubs not to have a single player nominated in the squad.

Club	Total	Player(s)
Adelaide	1	Rory Laird
Brisbane Lions	2	Harris Andrews, Dayne Beams
Carlton	1	Patrick Cripps
Collingwood	4	Jordan De Goey, Brodie Grundy, Scott Pendlebury, Steele Sidebottom
Essendon	1	Devon Smith
Fremantle	1	Lachie Neale
Geelong	4	Mark Blicavs, Patrick Dangerfield, Tom Hawkins, Tom Stewart
Gold Coast	0	
Greater Western Sydney	2	Callan Ward, Lachie Whitfield
Hawthorn	3	Luke Breust, Jack Gunston, Tom Mitchell
Melbourne	2	Max Gawn, Clayton Oliver
North Melbourne	2	Ben Brown, Shaun Higgins
Port Adelaide	2	Robbie Gray, Tom Jonas
Richmond	8	Josh Caddy, Trent Cotchin, Shane Edwards, Dylan Grimes, Kane Lambert, Dustin Martin, Alex Rance, Jack Riewoldt
St Kilda	0	
Sydney	2	Lance Franklin, Jake Lloyd
West Coast	4	Andrew Gaff, Shannon Hurn, Jeremy McGovern, Elliot Yeo
Western Bulldogs	1	Jack Macrae

=== Final team ===
Minor premiers Richmond had the most selections with four. Sydney forward Lance Franklin, who achieved selection for a record-equalling eighth time, was announced as the All-Australian captain, with Geelong midfielder and six-time All-Australian Patrick Dangerfield announced as vice-captain. The team saw ten players selected in an All-Australian team for the first time in their careers and included only four players from clubs not competing in that year's finals series.

2018 All-Australian team
B:	Tom Stewart (Geelong)	Alex Rance (Richmond)	Rory Laird (Adelaide)
HB:	Shannon Hurn (West Coast)	Jeremy McGovern (West Coast)	Lachie Whitfield (Greater Western Sydney)
C:	Andrew Gaff (West Coast)	Dustin Martin (Richmond)	Steele Sidebottom (Collingwood)
HF:	Patrick Dangerfield (Geelong) (vice-captain)	Lance Franklin (Sydney) (captain)	Robbie Gray (Port Adelaide)
F:	Jack Gunston (Hawthorn)	Jack Riewoldt (Richmond)	Luke Breust (Hawthorn)
Foll:	Max Gawn (Melbourne)	Patrick Cripps (Carlton)	Tom Mitchell (Hawthorn)
Int:	Brodie Grundy (Collingwood)	Clayton Oliver (Melbourne)	Shaun Higgins (North Melbourne)
Int:	Shane Edwards (Richmond)		
Coach:	Adam Simpson (West Coast)		

Note: the position of coach in the All-Australian team is traditionally awarded to the coach of the premiership team.
