= Shane Edwards =

Australian rules footballer (born 1987)

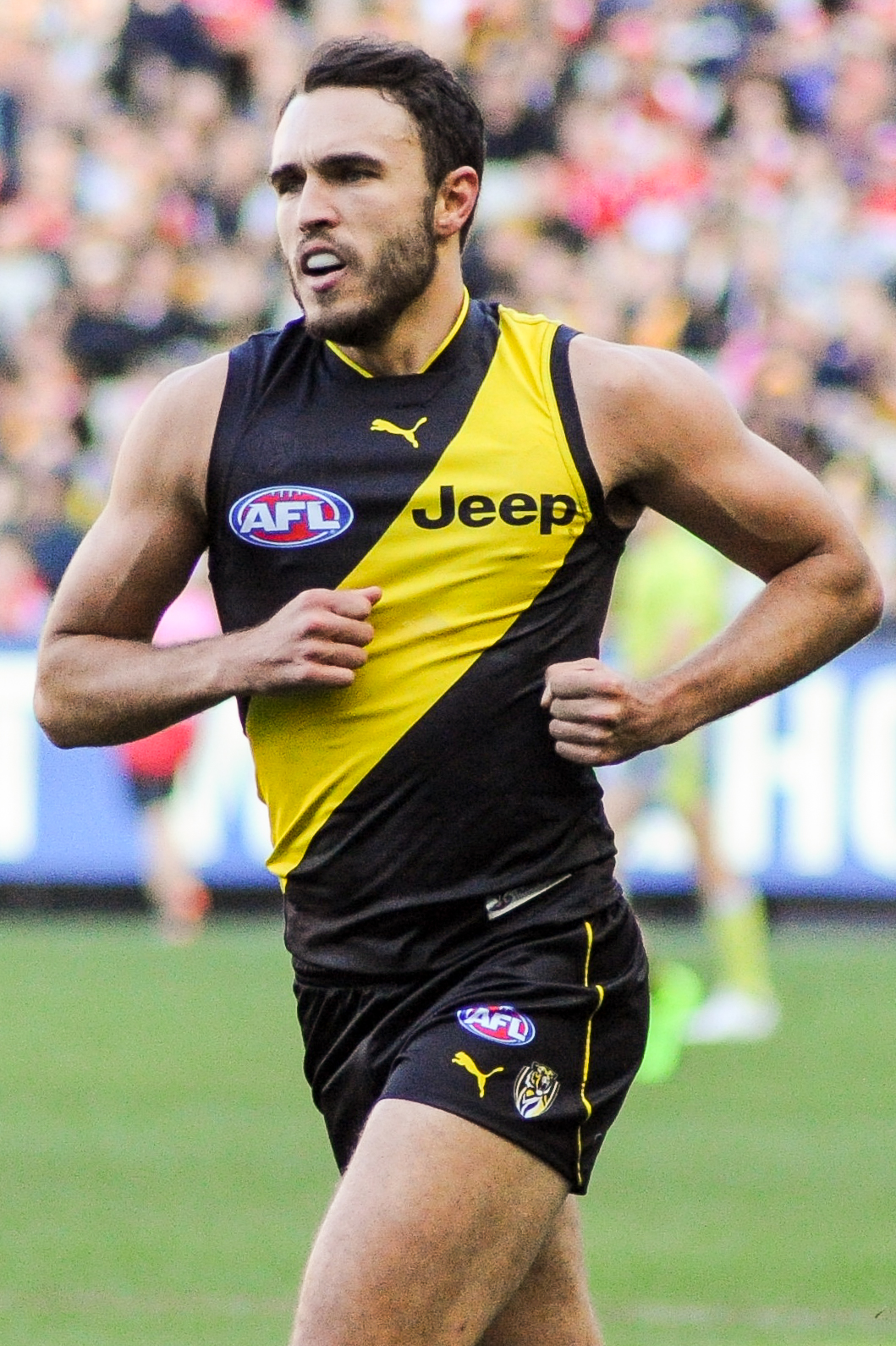
- Edwards with Richmond in June 2017

Personal information
- Nicknames: Titch, Shedda,
- Born: 25 October 1988 (age 38)
- Original team: North Adelaide (SANFL)
- Draft: No. 26, 2006 AFL National Draft: Richmond
- Debut: Round 4, 2007, Richmond vs. Western Bulldogs, at MCG
- Height: 182 cm (6 ft 0 in)
- Weight: 81 kg (179 lb)
- Position: Utility

Playing career^{1}
Years	Club	Games (Goals)
2007–2022	Richmond	303 (189)

Representative team honours^{2}
Years	Team	Games (Goals)
2015	Indigenous All-Stars	1 (0)
2020	All Stars	1 (0)
- ^{1} Playing statistics correct to the end of 2022 season.^{2} Representative statistics correct as of 2020.

Career highlights
- 3× AFL premiership player: 2017, 2019, 2020; All-Australian team: 2018; Yiooken Award: 2018; Jack Titus Medal (2nd RFC B&F): 2019; 2× Fred Swift Medal (4th RFC B&F): 2014, 2018

Shane Edwards (born 25 October 1988) is a former Australian rules football player who played for the Richmond Football Club in the Australian Football League (AFL). He is a three-time premiership player, an All-Australian and has three times placed in the top five in Richmond best and fairest awards. He holds the Richmond club records for most games by any Indigenous player and most games by any player in the number 10 guernsey.

Edwards is on record as saying he would like to go into recruitment and list management at the end of his AFL playing career.

== Early life and junior football ==
Edwards was born in South Australia to parents Tara and Greg. He spent his childhood years in the Adelaide suburb of Golden Grove and attended the local Golden Grove High School. He began playing football at age eight with the local Golden Grove Kookaburras in their inaugural year.

While playing at Under-13 level he signed with his locally zoned SANFL club North Adelaide and began playing with the club's junior sides. He was a member of the club's Under-19 premiership in 2006. Edwards made his senior SANFL debut at age 17 and played 10 games at senior level in 2006.

Edwards represented South Australia at the 2006 AFL Under 18 Championships. He kicked a goal in the state's second round loss to Victoria Country.

At the 2006 national draft combine he recorded top three scores in the beep test, three kilometre time trial and the standing vertical leap test.

== AFL career ==
=== 2007 season ===
Edwards was drafted by Richmond with the club's second pick and the 26th selection overall in the 2006 AFL National Draft.

He made his AFL debut in round 4 of the 2007 season in a match against the Western Bulldogs at the MCG. Edwards' first career goal came during his fifth match, in Round 10 against Brisbane. His first win came eight matches later, in round 19 against Collingwood. At the conclusion of his debut season Edwards had played 16 matches, kicked 11 goals and held averages of 10.3 disposals and 2.1 per game.

=== 2008 season ===
Edwards again missed out on round 1 selection in 2008 before playing his first match for the season in round 4. He played eight straight matches before missing out for the club's Round 12 clash with Melbourne. He kicked goals in six of those matches including two goals in rounds 5 and 7 and three goals in round 9 against Essendon. For his performance in that match he received his first Brownlow Medal vote. Edwards finished the season having again played 16 matches, but with one more goal and 20 more disposals than the previous year.

=== 2009 season ===
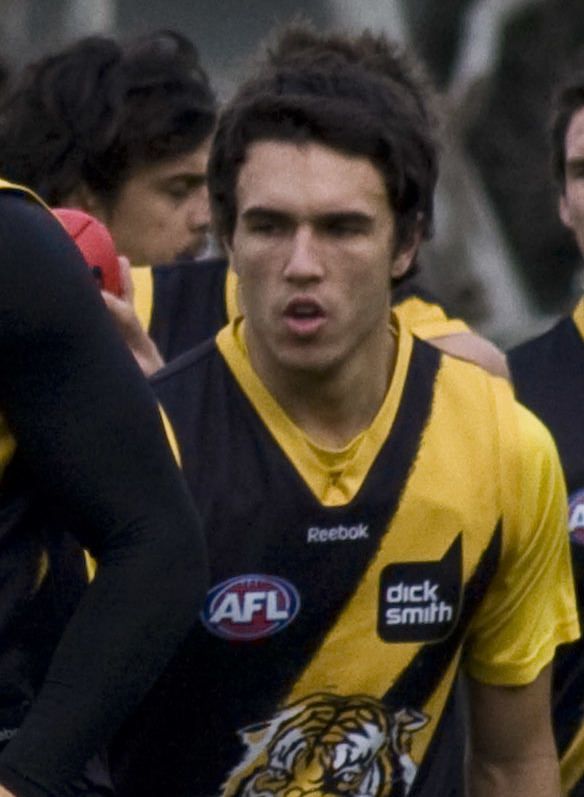
Edwards in August 2009

2009 began with Edwards in the club's best 22, where he stayed through the first three rounds of the season. But a six disposal performance in round 3 saw him dropped to reserves level where he stayed until Round 7. He did not get selected the following week however, and remained at reserves level until the midway point of the season. But when coach Terry Wallace was sacked prior to Round 12, Edwards saw new opportunity under caretaker Jade Rawlings. He was selected to play in Round 12 and kicked two goals to go with 17 disposals and six tackles in the club's win over West Coast at the Telstra Dome. He did not miss a game for the rest of the season, recording an average of 13.6 disposals a game over the back half.

=== 2010 season ===
Ahead of the 2010 season incoming coach Damien Hardwick assured Edwards that his development was a club priority, promising he would be selected in all 22 of the club's home and away matches that season. He played in the club's first two matches of the season before playing his 50th career match in Round 3 against Sydney. He recorded his first ever 20 disposal performance in that match. In Round 10 he set a career high with 11 tackles against Port Adelaide He broke his own disposal record on four occasions including a season-best 28 disposals in Richmond's Round 18 win over Adelaide. As promised, Edwards finished the season having played in all 22 Richmond matches. He set then-career-best totals in all major statistical categories as well as in tackles and disposals per game. For his break-out season Edwards placed sixth in the club's best and fairest count.

=== 2011 season ===
Having cemented a spot in the club's best 22 the year prior, Edwards played in each of the first eight matches of the 2011 season, including with a career best tally of nine marks in round 4 against Collingwood. However, in Round 8, he injured his cheekbone in a centre-square collision at the opening bounce. He was immediately ruled out for the remainder of the match and missed a further two matches as a result of the injury. When he returned in Round 12 he would again secure his place, playing in the final 12 matches of the season and finishing the season with 20 games and four goals.

=== 2012 season ===
In a January 2012 time trial Edwards placed fourth of all Richmond players and maintained his claim as one of the club's most damaging runners. He played in the first three matches of the season before missing in rounds 4 and 5. When he returned in round 6 he did not leave the side, playing in each of the last 17 matches of the season. He held a multiple goal streak of six games when he kicked four lots of two and two lots of three goals between Rounds 8 and 14. The final match in that streak was the 100th of his AFL career, played in round 14 against Adelaide at AAMI Stadium. He kicked a career high four goals in round 20 2012 against the Western Bulldogs at the MCG before setting another career best with four goal assists in round 22's match against Essendon. In that same match Edwards was reported for and ultimately acquitted of a striking charge for a hit on Essendon's Angus Monfries. For the second straight season he finished with 20 games in the season, though improved his goal-kicking tally to 29. It was good for third best at the club that season and helped earn him an eighth-place finish in the Jack Dyer Medal count.

=== 2013 season ===
Edwards saw his role change slightly in 2013, playing more minutes in the midfield. In addition his leadership role was increased, captaining the club in its pre-season clash with the Indigenous All Stars in Alice Springs. In Round 6 Edwards recorded a career best 30 disposals in a match against Geelong at the MCG. He suffered an eye injury in the third quarter of the club's Round 10 match against West Coast. He was substituted from the game and did not return to add to his two-goal first half tally. With Richmond's bye the following week he was able to recover and avoid missing a match as a result of the injury. He did however miss matches in Rounds 20, 21 and 23 before returning fully fit to play in his first final, a losing effort against Carlton at the MCG. At years end he had played 20 matches, kicked 11 goals and set a then career-best tackles per-game mark. He placed 14th in the club's best and fairest that season.

He's an incredible talent, he does things that only a few people can do. The ability for him to get in and out of traffic and create goals for others is outstanding.

— Damien Hardwick, Richmond coach - 2014

=== 2014 season ===
2014 would prove an exceptional year for Edwards, but one which included a form reversal after a relatively slow start. After playing in Richmond's first six matches of the season Edwards would be played as Richmond's substitute in its Round 7 match against Geelong. Despite the setback he ultimately kicked two goals in just 39 per cent time on ground. In late May he signed a new two-year contract extension, forgoing the lure of unrestricted free-agency. By Round 15 he began to turn an average season into a special one, with a 20 disposal and six clearance match against St Kilda. He was later named among the club's best players for a 21 disposal and one goal performance against the Greater Western Sydney in Round 21. Edwards then played his 150th AFL match in Richmond's Round 22 win over St Kilda. During the club's nine match win streak from Round 15 to 23 he averaged 20.7 disposals, 11.2 contested possessions, one goal and 3.5 tackles per game. He again played in a losing elimination final in 2014, this time contributing 11 disposals and one goal in the match against Port Adelaide. At season's end Edwards was awarded the Fred Swift Medal for placing fourth in the club's best and fairest count in 2014. He was also awarded Richmond life membership in December that year after celebrating his 150th match for the club at AFL level.

=== 2015 season ===
As with the back-half of 2014, Edwards would again attend centre-bounces and play a predominately midfield role in the 2015 season. He started the season by recording 21 disposals together with game highs in clearances (7) and contested possessions (15) in Richmond's win over Carlton at the MCG. He received six votes (second to only Taylor Hunt) in the AFL Coaches Association award for the match. He missed Round 2 with calf tightness but made a quick return to kick a goal and rack up 26 disposals in Round 3's win over Brisbane. The Richmond club website named him the Tigers' best on ground the following week after he recorded 24 disposals, two goals, seven clearances and five tackles in the Round 4 Anzac Day eve clash against Melbourne. After six rounds he held averages of 22 disposals, five tackles and one goal per game. He again missed a match in Round 7, this time with a corked calf. Edwards was named best on ground when he was awarded three Brownlow votes in Round 9's Dreamtime at the 'G match against Essendon. He was fined $2,500 by the AFL Match Review panel after he was found to have started and partook in melee in the club's Round 10 win over ladder-leading Fremantle. At the mid-season bye Edwards held averages of 21.6 disposals, 0.88 goals, 4.4 tackles and 4.6 clearances per game and was considered in the discussion for end of season All Australian honours. In Round 13 Edwards was bumped off the ball in an incident that saw Sydney forward Lance Franklin suspended for one week. Edwards was named among Richmond's best players for a two-goal game, 24 disposal performance in Round 14 against the GWS Giants. He was substituted in the third quarter of the next week's match after suffering a lower leg injury. Scans later revealed he had sustained a hairline fracture in his right fibula and initial estimates placed a two to three week timeline on recovery. He ultimately missed five matches of AFL football, before returning in the club's Round 21 win over Collingwood. For the third straight season Edwards played in a losing elimination final with the club. He was this time the subject of some controversy when no free kick was paid for his tackle on North Melbourne's Ben Cunnington deep in the Richmond forward line late in the match's fourth quarter. Coach Damien Hardwick called the non-decision "diabolical" while AFL umpiring boss Hayden Kennedy later admitted the call was incorrect and should have been rewarded with a free kick on goal.

=== 2016 season ===
In addition to signing a fresh contract extension, Edwards' 2015-16 off season saw him added to the club's five-man leadership group. In the pre-season Edwards was moved to a more permanent forward role, a switch endorsed by Network Seven commentator and Richmond club legend Matthew Richardson. Edwards suffered a bruised collarbone in the final pre-season match of the year and faced a reduced training load in the lead up to Round 1. Though he did indeed play Round 1, he suffered another injury during the match, this time in the form of a fractured hand. Despite needing surgery to repair it, Edwards would miss only one match as a result of the injury. In Round 6 Edwards recorded a career high 10 clearances in Richmond's loss to Port Adelaide . He kicked three goals in Round 12 against Gold Coast, his first such haul since Round 23, 2012. Edwards suffered a calf injury at training in late July and would miss two games as a result. At season's end Edwards held averages of 18.7 disposals and 0.8 goals per game. He placed equal 12th in the club's best and fairest count.

=== 2017 season ===
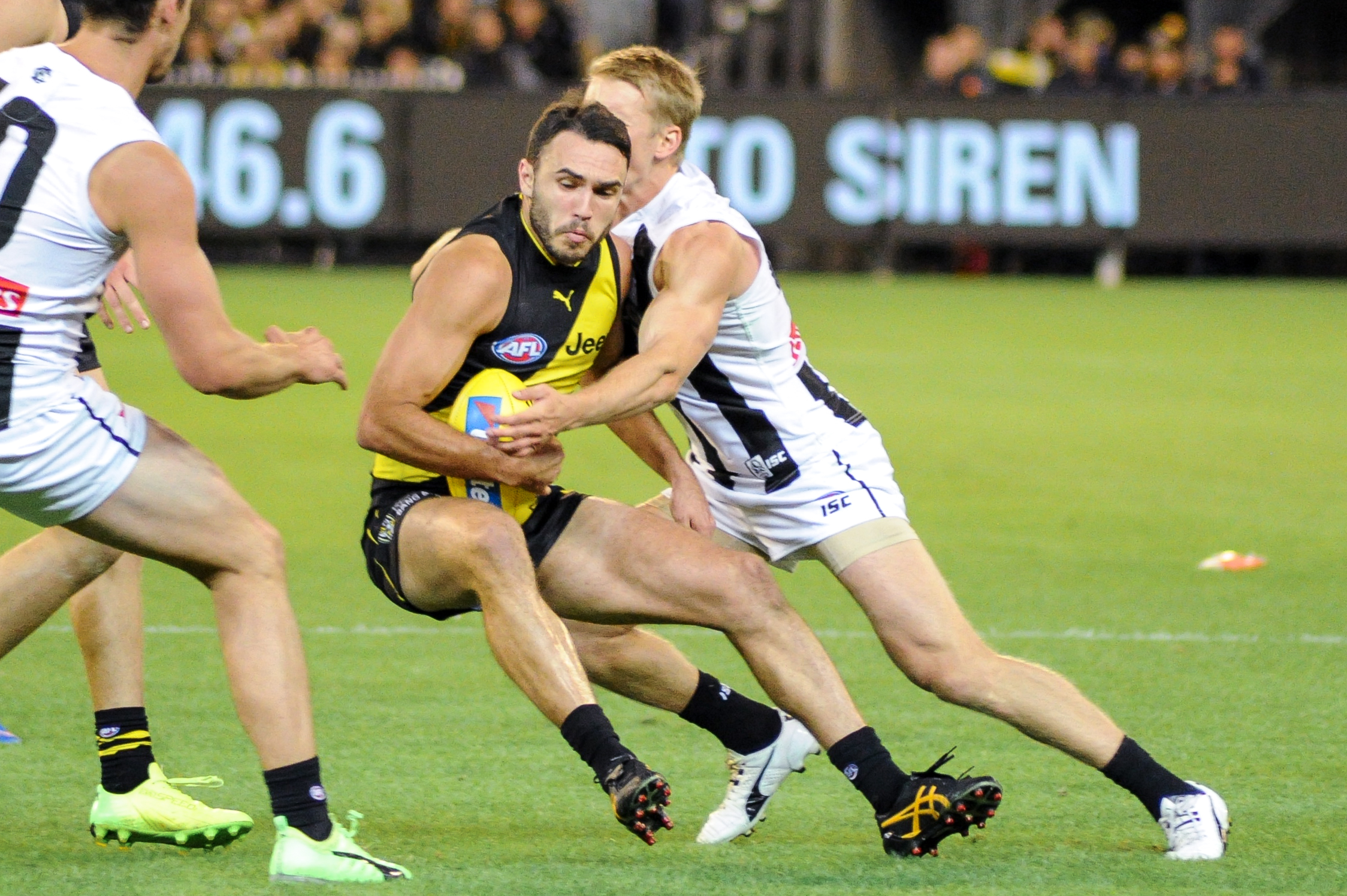
Edwards fending off a tackle from Josh Smith during the AFL round two match between Richmond and Collingwood

Edwards entered 2017 as Richmond's longest tenured player following the off-season departure of Brett Deledio to Greater Western Sydney. Despite this he was removed from the club leadership group when it was reduced down from five players to three. He would play in the first two matches of the season before a hip injury sustained in the late stages of Round 2 held him out from football the following week. After five weeks of rehab he returned to play Fremantle in Round 8. During Round 10's Dreamtime at the 'G clash with Essendon, Edwards swapped his number 10 guernsey for the number 67. In doing so he became one of a handful of players across the league that round to commemorate the 50th anniversary of the 1967 referendum which, among other things, changed the constitution to allow Indigenous Australians to be counted with the general population in the census. Through the mid-season bye he had played six matches and held averages of 17.3 disposals, 0.8 goals and 2.8 tackles per game. He did not miss a match from that point until the end of the season, including playing in his 200th career match in round 19 against the Gold Coast Suns. He thus became the 27th person to play 200 games at Richmond and the first indigenous player at Richmond to do so. When September came, Edwards kicked a goal, had 24 disposals and set a personal season best tally with six marks in his side's qualifying final win over Geelong. He performed strongly in the following preliminary final too, winning 10 contested possessions and playing a key link-up role in the win over the GWS Giants. Though it was not known publicly at the time, he sustained a broken finger in that match, the result of which saw him unable to complete simple tasks like holding a fork. Despite the injury Edwards turned in one of the best performances of his career in the Grand Final, leading the team for clearances and inside 50s and earning two votes in the best afield voting to finish equal third behind only Bachar Houli and winner Dustin Martin. Edwards finished the match with 13 contested possessions and a total 25 disposals, including eight in the crucial second quarter alone. Richmond would ultimately win out over minor premiers Adelaide by 48 points and make Edwards a premiership player in his 11th season and 207th AFL match. During that finals series he ranked second at the club for AFL Player Rating points.

=== 2018 season ===
During the 2017/18 off-season Edwards was named by the AFL's official stat keeper Champion Data as "elite" in the midfielder-forward role, one of three such players in the league. During this time he also faced a restricted training program, having his hand in a splint until late December as a result of a broken thumb sustain in the previous year's finals series. Despite this setback he showed no apparent drop in form, playing in each of the club's first three matches of the season. He was recognised among the matches' best players when he received four votes in the Coaches Association award tally in round 4's win over Hawthorn. Edwards was again a key player in round 5, this time recording 26 disposals and five clearances in the ANZAC Day eve match against Melbourne. He did however receive the negative attention of the AFL's Match Review Officer, attracting a $2,000 fine for rough conduct on Neville Jetta in the second quarter of that match. After seven rounds of the 2018 season Edwards was ranked first in the league for goal assists (23), a whole seven assists above the league's next best. He was also at this time labelled by Fox Footy analyst David King as a "silent assassin" for his ability to gain ground with stealthy forward handball. In round 11's Dreamtime at the 'G match against Essendon Edwards recorded a career best 31 disposals, added seven score assists and kicked two goals in a performance that saw him receive the Yiooken Award as clear best on ground. In doing so he became the first Indigenous player to win the award in its 13-year history. After that match Richmond head coach Damien Hardwick labelled Edwards one of the best players in the club's history, saying "he'll go down as one of the greats of our footy club". The following week he added another two goals and was named by AFL Media as one of Richmond's best, this time in an away loss to Port Adelaide. After 12 rounds, Edwards ranked 38th in the league under the AFL Player Ratings system, having ranked 101st at the same point of the year previous. In round 16's win over Adelaide he turned in another fantastic performance with 28 disposals and two goals that saw him split best on ground honours with teammate Kane Lambert according to the AFL Coaches association award voting. His efforts in that match were ranked as the second best among all players in the league that round according to the AFL PLayer Ratings system. That saw him continue to rise up the ratings system, to rank as the 24th best player overall in the league. Edwards was again named among Richmond's best in round 19, this time for a 22 disposal and one goal game against Collingwood. After round 20, Edwards was ranked by Champion Data as the league's 11th best player so far that season, despite having been ranked the 104th best on a two-year basis as recently as round 15. He also held the fifth-best kicking efficiency among midfielders and ranked number one overall for metres gained by handball with 1290 metres, close to double the second-placed Adam Treloar (735 metres). Edwards finished the home and away season having played in all of Richmond's 22 matches for the first time since 2014. At season's end Edwards was selected to a bench spot on the 2018 All-Australian team. He was also named at half-forward in the AFL's Player Ratings team of the year and was one of three Richmond players nominated for the AFL Players Association's Most Valuable Player award. Edwards contributed a goal and 14 disposals in Richmond's qualifying final win over Hawthorn in the finals series' opening week before adding 14 disposals in the club's season-ending shock preliminary final loss to Collingwood. Following the conclusion of the 2018 finals series, Edwards was named by the Herald Sun's chief football writer Mark Robinson as the league's 47th best player during the 2018 season. He finished the year ranked second in the league for goals assists (31) and 18th for score involvements (152) and placed fourth in Richmond's best and fairest award.

=== 2019 season ===
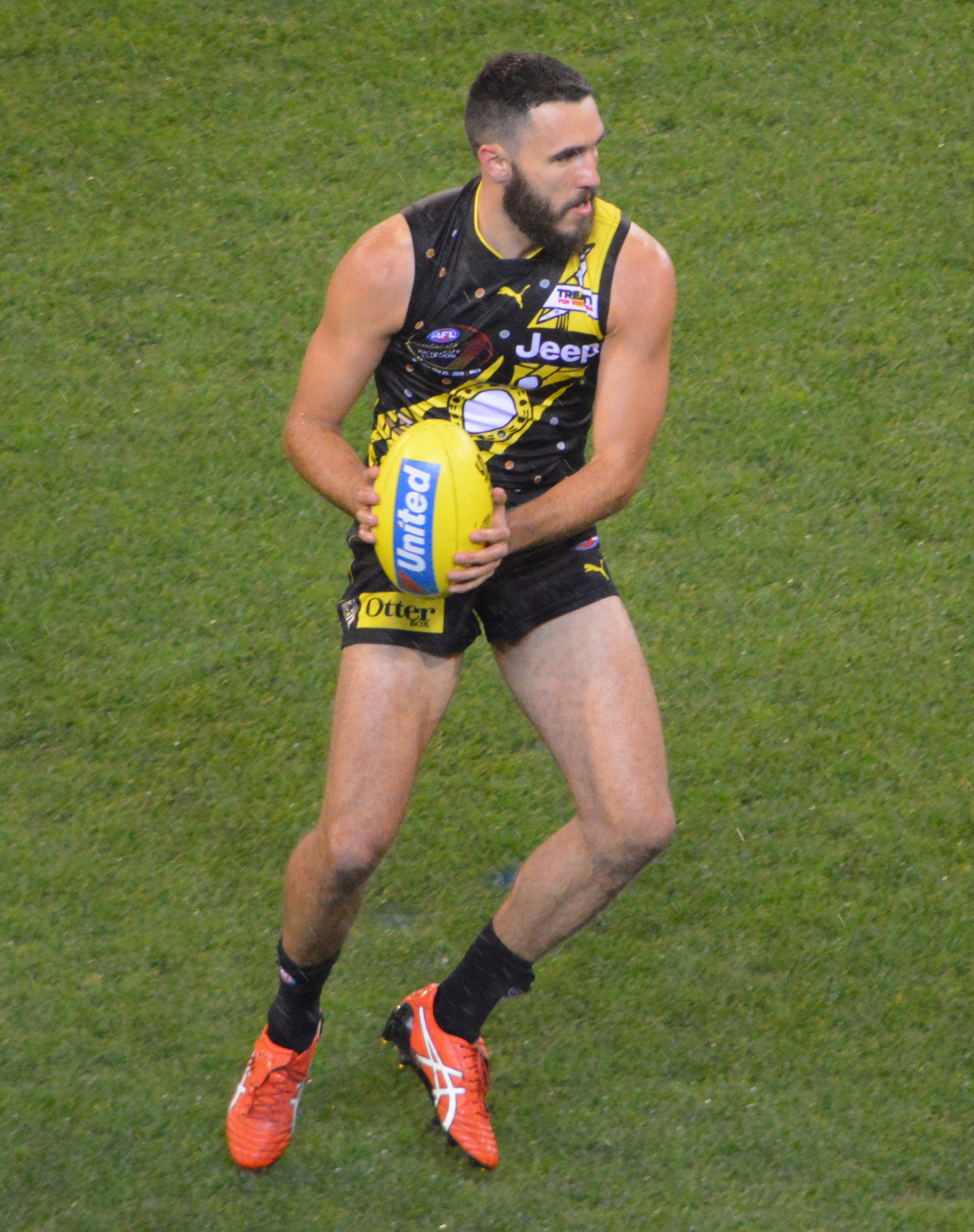
Edwards prepares to handball in the Dreamtime at the 'G match in May 2019

Ahead of the 2019 season, Edwards was named by Champion Data as the league's best midfielder/forward and the 17th best player overall under the AFL's Player Ratings System. Edwards started the 2019 season with appearances in each of the club's two pre-season matches before recording 22 disposals in round 1's season-opening match against Carlton. He kicked two goals in round 2 and also received a $2000 fine for striking Collingwood's Adam Treloar in that loss. Following injuries to captain Trent Cotchin and vice-captains Jack Riewoldt and Alex Rance, Edwards was appointed to captain Richmond for the first time in round 4. He led the side to an improbable win in that match against Port Adelaide, despite the absence of those leaders as well as Brownlow Medalist Dustin Martin. Edwards shifted into a half-back role for the win, recording 23 disposals and 11 intercepts while earning four AFL Coaches Association votes as the third best player on the ground. He continued in his role at half-back and as acting captain the following week, this time collecting 28 disposals, six coaches votes and earning a place in AFL Media's Team of the Week. Edwards relinquished the captaincy to the returning Riewoldt in round 6, before a new injury to the forward forced Edwards to again captain the side in round 7. Two weeks later he earned seven coaches award votes for 26 disposals, eight intercepts and eight score involvements in a win over Hawthorn. Seven more coaches votes followed in round 10's Dreamtime at the 'G win, Edwards' last as Richmond captain which brought his record in the role to six wins and one loss. Edwards was a gameday omission in round 13, with hamstring tendonitis forcing him to miss his first match through injury since round 7, 2017. He returned after missing one match and following the club's mid-season bye, having been named by AFL Media during that time as a mid-season contender for a second straight All-Australian selection. Edwards returned to a role through the midfield and half-forward for round 16's win over Gold Coast, collecting 25 disposals and four inside-50s. Barring one match against Port Adelaide in round 18 where he played in defence, Edward remained in the midfield and forward lines for the later part of the season, including in round 20 when he collected an equal career-best 31 disposals while playing as an inside midfielder. In round 21 he became the 250th player in AFL/VFL history to reach 250 games and the 15th player to reach the same milestone in matches for Richmond. He was among Richmond's best players in that match, recording 27 disposals and a goal to earn six votes in the coaches association award. Edwards improved that mark the following week, earning eight votes as the second best on ground for a performance that included a goal, 29 disposals and a career-best 11 clearances. In that match he also passed Australian Football Hall of Fame Legend Kevin Sheedy for the most games played in the number 10 guernsey by any player at Richmond. At the end of the home and away season Edwards was named in the AFL's Player Ratings team of the year and in the best 22 in Fox Footy football reporter Tom Morris' team of the year. Despite that, he was left out of the squad of 40 players for the All-Australian team and was recognised by Fox Footy as one of the league's most glaring omissions. Edwards was one of the best players on field during his side's road qualifying final win over the Brisbane Lions, kicking a goal and collecting eight clearances, 18 contested possessions and 29 disposals including 13 in the decisive third quarter. He received nine coaches votes for the performance as equal-best on ground. Edwards was somewhat quieter in the preliminary final a fortnight later, finishing with 18 possessions and a goal assist as his side defeated Geelong and earned a grand final berth against Greater Western Sydney. He turned in what AFL Media described as "another excellent performance" in the grand final, collecting 21 disposals, six tackles and six clearances as Richmond defeated the Giants by 89 points to win a second premiership in three seasons. Though he did not receive a vote in the official Norm Smith Medal count for best afield, Edwards was named the third best player of the game by the AFL's statistical Official Player Ratings At the conclusion of the finals he ranked as the league's best general defender by Champion Data, despite his use across multiple positions that season. He led Richmond for contested possessions, stoppage clearances and tackles during the three finals that year and finished the whole year ranked third at the club for total contested possessions and clearances. Edwards placed second in the club's best and fairest count, a career-best placing that saw him awarded him the Jack Titus Medal. He was also named as the league's 26th best player in the Herald Sun chief football reporter Mark Robinson's list of the league's best players in 2019.

=== 2020 season ===
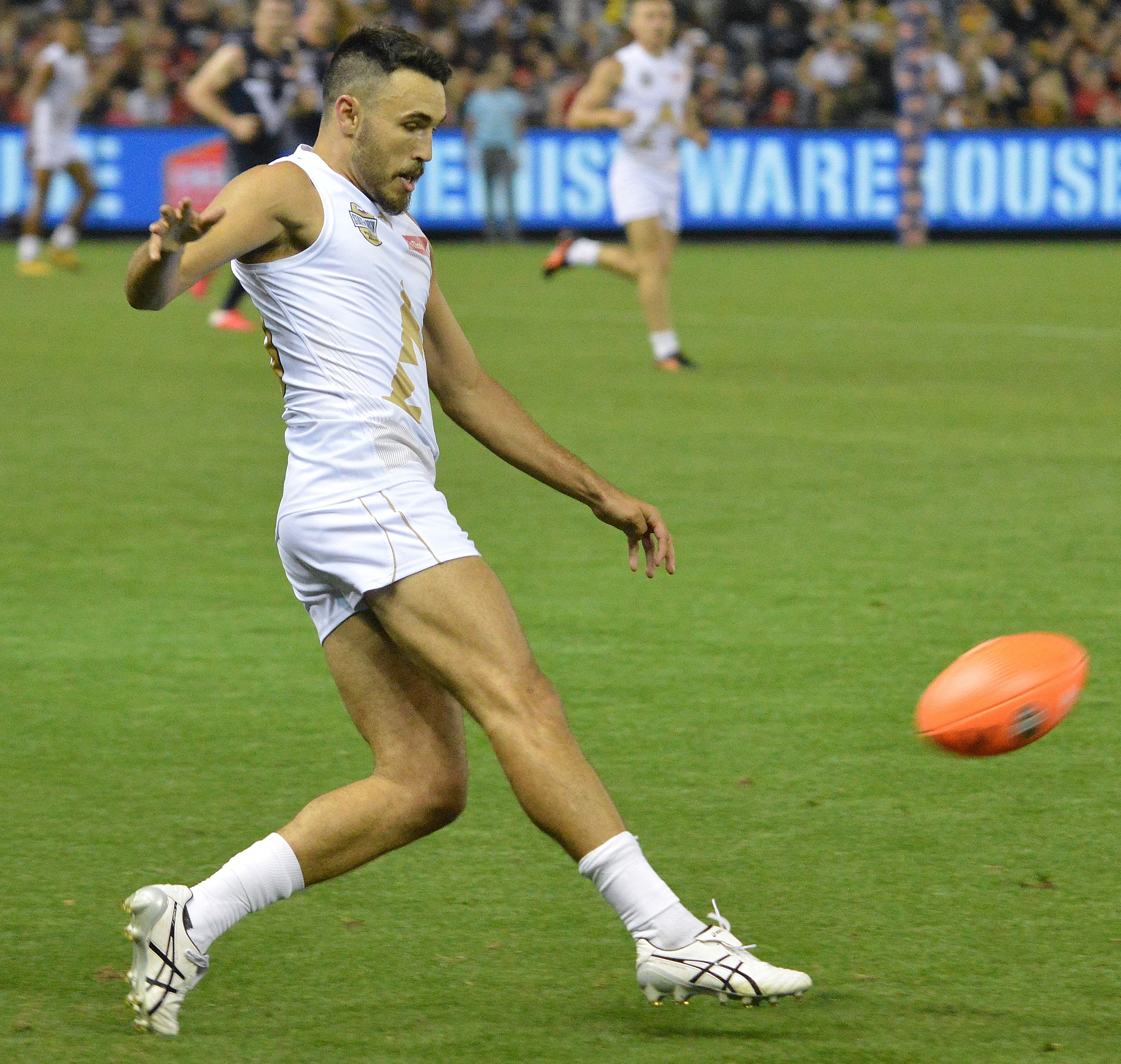
Edwards kicks during the 2020 State of Origin for Bushfire Relief match

Over the 2019/20 off-season, Edwards was rated by AFL statistics partner Champion Data in the top-tier "elite" category among midfielder-forwards. He played his first match for the year in the AFL's fundraising State of Origin for Bushfire Relief Match in February, representing his home state of South Australia as part of the allied All-Stars side. He sat out Richmond's first pre-season match that same weekend but returned for the club's final pre-season match against Greater Western Sydney a week later. Despite an uninterrupted pre-season, the rapid progression of the coronavirus pandemic into Australia by mid-March saw the future of the season in doubt, including Edwards and Richmond's premiership defence. The AFL commission eventually announced the start of the season would proceed as scheduled, but without fans in attendance due to public health prohibitions on group gatherings. With the expectation that a significant break would be necessary mid-season, the league also announced the season would be completed with a modified 17-round fixture and with quarter lengths reduced by one fifth to reduce the load on players who would be expected to play multiple matches with short breaks in the back half of the year. Edwards kicked the opening goal of the season and was named by AFL Media among Richmond's best players under those conditions in round 1's win over Carlton. Just three days later however, the AFL commission suspended the season after multiple states enforced quarantine conditions on their borders that effectively ruled out the possibility of continuing the season as planned. Edwards recorded 13 disposals in a draw with Collingwood when the season resumed in early June after an 11-week hiatus, and was among his side's best players with 24 disposals and a goal in a loss to St Kilda a fortnight after that. He played one further match before a virus outbreak in Melbourne caused the club to relocate to the Gold Coast. With a heavily pregnant partner, Edwards elected to remain in Melbourne where he trained with other non-travelling clubmates while awaiting the birth of his baby daughter in August. Following the birth, Edwards entered Queensland quarantine in September as a member of the AFL's final travelling party of the year. He trained there for a two-week period alongside Gary Ablett Jr. and Dan Hannebery before immediately earning selection in Richmond's regular-season-ending round 18 win over Adelaide. Edwards was best on ground in that win, earning nine coaches award votes for a performance that included four score involvements and a game-high eight clearances. After a quiet showing in a qualifying final loss to the Brisbane Lions to open the finals series, Edwards was back to his match-winning best with 21 disposals, five clearances and two goals in a semi-final win over St Kilda one week later. Fox Footy labeled his output 'crucial' in the six-point preliminary final win over Port Adelaide that followed, despite recording a season-low 11 disposals. He became a three-time premiership played the following week, helping his side to a 31-point grand final victory over Geelong. Edwards placed third in the Norm Smith Medal voting for his excellent performance in the win, after recording a game-high nine clearances and a personal season-best 27 disposals. He also secured equal-fifth place in the Gary Ayres Award for the finals series best player.

=== 2021 season ===
Edwards entered the 2021 season ranked in the 'elite' category among the league's midfielder-forwards by the AFL's official statistical partner Champion Data. He played in Richmond's one unofficial and one official pre-season match in late-February and early-March before recording 27 disposals and eight score involvements in the club's round 1 win over Carlton. In round 3 he played his 268th career game, tying Chris Newman to move into 10th place on the Richmond club leaderboard. Edwards was equal-second best on ground two weeks later, attracting five coaches votes for a performance that included 29 disposals, seven clearances and a goal. He was again impressive in round 8, being named among his side's best players by AFL Media in a loss to Geelong despite being substituted out of the game in the second half as a result of an ankle injury. The injury was later revealed to be a deltoid ligament injury, and treatment saw him ruled out from playing over the next three weeks. He initially completed injury rehabilitation in Melbourne despite the playing side being relocated out of the state temporarily as a result of a COVID-19 outbreak in Melbourne, before joining his teammates in time to play in the club's round 12 Dreamtime in Perth match against Essendon. He did so in a guernsey he helped to design and which partly told the story of his Indigenous heritage.

== Player profile ==
Edwards is a versatile player, playing the early part of his career as a forward but featuring in three Richmond premiership sides as an inside midfielder. In 2018 he earned All-Australian selection while being rated the second best midfielder-forward in the league by Champion Data and while he led the league for goal assists. He is among the most damaging handballers in the game, having led the league for metres gained by handball in 2018. In 2019, teammate Jack Riewoldt called Edwards the best handballer he had ever seen. In 2019 injuries to many of Richmond's key players saw Edwards used as a half-back for the first time in his career, before return to various midfield and forward roles for the second half of that season.

In 2020, the Herald Sun labelled Edwards the eighth best Richmond player of the AFL era.

Edwards has played more games for Richmond than any other Indigenous player in club history.

== Statistics ==
Statistics are correct to the end of round 22, 2022

Legend
G	Goals	K	Kicks	D	Disposals	T	Tackles
B	Behinds	H	Handballs	M	Marks
#	Played in that season's premiership team

Season	Team	No.	Games	Totals							Averages (per game)							Votes
Season	Team	No.	Games	G	B	K	H	D	M	T	G	B	K	H	D	M	T	Votes
2007	Richmond	10	16	11	7	88	77	165	55	35	0.7	0.4	5.5	4.8	10.3	3.4	2.2	0
2008	Richmond	10	16	12	11	82	103	185	46	30	0.8	0.7	5.1	6.4	11.6	2.9	1.9	1
2009	Richmond	10	15	5	3	87	102	189	35	30	0.3	0.2	5.8	6.8	12.6	2.3	2.0	0
2010	Richmond	10	22	7	8	218	196	414	61	76	0.3	0.4	9.9	8.9	18.8	2.8	3.5	0
2011	Richmond	10	20	4	12	156	157	313	66	58	0.2	0.6	7.8	7.9	15.7	3.3	2.9	0
2012	Richmond	10	20	29	26	167	188	355	49	56	1.5	1.3	8.4	9.4	17.8	2.5	2.8	2
2013	Richmond	10	20	11	12	178	186	364	43	71	0.6	0.6	8.9	9.3	18.2	2.2	3.6	0
2014	Richmond	10	23	22	16	192	214	406	54	75	1.0	0.7	8.3	9.3	17.7	2.3	3.1	0
2015	Richmond	10	16	13	9	152	148	300	44	56	0.8	0.6	9.5	9.3	18.8	2.8	3.5	6
2016	Richmond	10	19	15	12	166	189	355	43	55	0.8	0.6	8.7	9.9	18.7	2.3	2.9	0
2017^{#}	Richmond	10	20	11	16	154	199	353	55	58	0.6	0.8	7.7	10.0	17.7	2.8	2.9	0
2018	Richmond	10	24	14	8	190	272	462	51	68	0.6	0.3	7.9	11.3	19.3	2.1	2.8	7
2019^{#}	Richmond	10	24	7	2	239	287	526	79	75	0.3	0.1	10.0	12.0	21.9	3.3	3.1	0
2020^{#} (Note: The 2020 season was played with 17 home-and-away matches per team (down from 22) and 16-minute quarters with time on (down from 20-minute quarters with time on) due to the impact of the COVID-19 pandemic.)	Richmond	10	10	5	1	78	94	172	10	27	0.5	0.1	7.8	9.4	17.2	1.0	2.7	1
2021	Richmond	10	16	8	3	149	145	294	47	36	0.5	0.2	9.3	9.1	18.4	2.9	2.3	0
2022	Richmond	10	21	15	8	151	134	285	51	31	0.7	0.4	7.2	6.4	13.6	2.4	1.5	0
Career			302	189	154	2447	2691	5138	789	837	0.6	0.5	8.1	8.9	17.0	2.6	2.8	17

== Honours and achievements ==
Team

- 3× AFL premiership player (Richmond): 2017, 2019, 2020
- McClelland Trophy (Richmond): 2018

Individual

- All-Australian team: 2018
- Jack Titus Medal (2nd RFC B&F): 2019
- 2× Fred Swift Medal (4th RFC B&F): 2014, 2018
- Yiooken Award: 2018

== Personal life ==
His father Greg Edwards was a talented footballer with Central Districts in the SANFL. He holds the club record as the first and only player to kick 100 goals in a season (1982). His career was ended at the age of 20 when an injury left him blind in his left eye. His brother Kym played with North Adelaide in the SANFL.

Edwards' paternal grandfather Doug played West Torrens and North Adelaide while his uncle Russell was also a SANFL player for Port Adelaide.

Outside of playing, Edwards has worked as a part-time scout for Richmond, learning the role alongside the club's other recruiters at NAB League matches since 2018.

His maternal grandmother is from the Arunta people from central Australia and was raised on a mission in Mount Gambier, whilst his maternal grandfather is German.

Edwards has two children with partner Samantha Erichsdotter, a girl born in August 2020 and another girl born August 2024.
