= Shaun Higgins =

Australian rules footballer

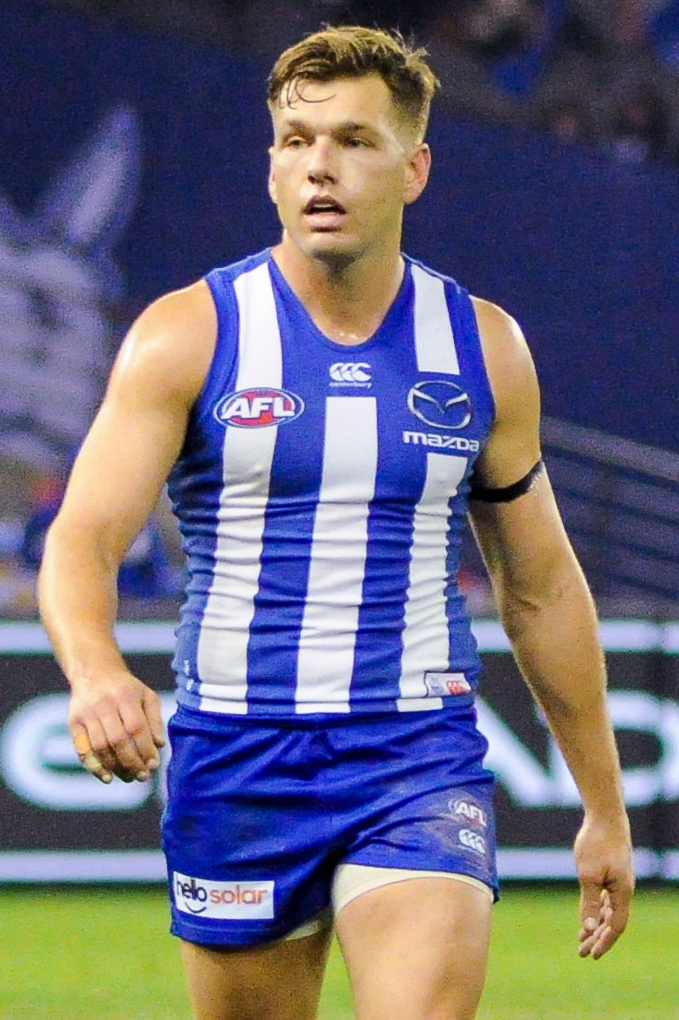
- Higgins playing for North Melbourne in 2017

Personal information
- Full name: Shaun Higgins
- Born: 4 March 1988 (age 38)
- Original team: Geelong Falcons (TAC Cup)
- Draft: No. 11, 2005 national draft
- Debut: Round 9, 2006, Western Bulldogs vs. Collingwood, at the MCG
- Height: 184 cm (6 ft 0 in)
- Weight: 89 kg (196 lb)
- Position: Midfielder / forward

Playing career
Years	Club	Games (Goals)
2006–2014	Western Bulldogs	129 (128)
2015–2020	North Melbourne	108 (96)
2021–2022	Geelong	23 (5)
Total		260 (229)

Representative team honours
Years	Team	Games (Goals)
2020	Victoria	1 (0)

International team honours
2017	Australia	1 (0)

Career highlights
- All-Australian team: 2018; 2× Syd Barker Medal: 2017, 2018; AFL Rising Star nominee: 2007

Shaun Higgins (born 4 March 1988) is a former professional Australian rules footballer who played in the Australian Football League (AFL). Higgins played for the Western Bulldogs from 2006 to 2014, the North Melbourne Football Club from 2015 to 2020 and the Geelong Football Club from 2021 to 2022. Higgins is a dual Syd Barker Medallist and was selected in the 2018 All-Australian team. He received a nomination for the 2007 AFL Rising Star award in round 8 of the 2007 season.

== Early life ==
Higgins was raised in Geelong, Victoria and attended St Joseph's College. He played junior football for St. Joseph’s football and netball club and was a Geelong supporter. His father Mick played reserves football for Geelong. His sister Danielle played netball for the Geelong Cougars in the Victorian Netball League and played football for Geelong in the AFL Women's (AFLW).

Higgins was the Geelong Falcons' best onballer and was projected to be a top-ten selection in the 2005 AFL draft, but fell to pick 11, the Western Bulldogs's first selection.

== AFL career ==
=== Western Bulldogs (2006–2014) ===
He managed to make his debut in his first season, against Collingwood. He played mostly as a small forward then but suffered a season-ending elbow injury in round 13 against the West Coast Eagles, ruling him out of that year's finals campaign. Before his injury he showed flashes of brilliance in front of goals. But his fitness levels were not quite up. But even at that stage he was a standout with his accurate kicking and awareness of what was around him.

After missing the previous season with an elbow injury, Higgins established himself as a forward in 2007, contributing as a goal kicker and playmaker. He kicked the winning goal in a match against Collingwood — the same club he had debuted against — and was the Round 8 nominee for the 2007 NAB Rising Star award.

Following a win against Adelaide to open the season Higgins contributed to the win. His Season was interrupted in round 2 with a Broken Ankle against Melbourne when he landed on it coming down from a Marking contest. The injury was initially expected to keep him out for a few weeks, but recovery took longer than anticipated. But came back to play in the Finals. When he was injured, he was always in the Bulldogs rooms supporting his teammates and this was the first sign of Leadership that he shown and he later was voted by his peers as a leader. In the preliminary Final against Geelong, Higgins was playing on Darren Milburn, Higgins went on to kick two goals on him and set one up and Milburn got taken off the ground.

Although he is primarily a forward, Higgins has been used sometimes in the midfield. In 2009 Higgins was promoted into the Leadership group. And he received a number 7 on his shirt that was worn by Scott West and Doug Hawkins before him. Higgins had a pre-season that was there with Daniel Cross and Matthew Boyd in the time trials. He was touted as being a potential captain of the Club. He had a successful 2009 season but then had hamstring troubles that negatively affected his performance. He has the ability of kicking both feet. His most notable goal was against Geelong. He signed a contract extension midway through the season.

=== North Melbourne (2015–2020) ===
On 3 October 2014, Higgins signed with the North Melbourne Football Club as a restricted free agent after the Western Bulldogs decided not to match the Kangaroos' offer. Higgins had a stellar first season with North Melbourne, playing 24 games and kicking 39 goals. Higgins was also one of their most consistent players all year playing as a high half forward. The 2016 season however, was not one to remember for Higgins as he injured himself in round 7, thus ruling him out for three months. Higgins returned in round 23 and played in the losing elimination final.

Higgins played every match for the 2017 season apart from the round five match against Fremantle to go on and win his first best and fairest, the Syd Barker Medal. At the end of the 2019 season, Higgins signed a one-year contract extension, turning his back on interest from Geelong.

In 2020 he was named in the St Joseph’s College team of champions, recognising the best VFL/AFL players to have attended the school.

=== Geelong (2021–2022) ===
At the conclusion of the 2020 season, Higgins was asked to look elsewhere by North Melbourne to secure his future and accepted a two-year deal at Geelong; he was traded for pick 30 in that year's draft.

== Statistics ==
Legend
G	Goals	K	Kicks	D	Disposals	T	Tackles
B	Behinds	H	Handballs	M	Marks

Season	Team	No.	Games	Totals							Averages (per game)							Votes
Season	Team	No.	Games	G	B	K	H	D	M	T	G	B	K	H	D	M	T	Votes
2006	Western Bulldogs	19	5	3	3	36	24	60	14	9	0.6	0.6	7.2	4.8	12.0	2.8	1.8	0
2007	Western Bulldogs	19	20	26	10	127	120	247	74	38	1.3	0.5	6.4	6.0	12.4	3.7	1.9	1
2008	Western Bulldogs	19	7	4	6	45	52	97	20	18	0.6	0.9	6.4	7.4	13.9	2.9	2.6	0
2009	Western Bulldogs	7	20	32	18	231	191	422	105	52	1.6	0.9	11.6	9.6	21.1	5.3	2.6	11
2010	Western Bulldogs	7	17	17	8	185	158	343	63	52	1.0	0.5	10.9	9.3	20.2	3.7	3.1	1
2011	Western Bulldogs	7	18	12	16	205	173	378	80	70	0.7	0.9	11.4	9.6	21.0	4.4	3.9	1
2012	Western Bulldogs	7	19	22	16	195	146	341	81	57	1.2	0.8	10.3	7.7	17.9	4.3	3.0	0
2013	Western Bulldogs	7	3	3	4	30	11	41	17	10	1.0	1.3	10.0	3.7	13.7	5.7	3.3	0
2014	Western Bulldogs	7	20	9	4	212	196	408	72	64	0.5	0.2	10.6	9.8	20.4	3.6	3.2	2
2015	North Melbourne	4	24	39	26	233	236	469	104	90	1.6	1.1	9.7	9.8	19.5	4.3	3.8	8
2016	North Melbourne	4	9	11	5	67	83	150	34	31	1.2	0.6	7.4	9.2	16.7	3.8	3.4	1
2017	North Melbourne	4	21	18	25	269	224	493	77	106	0.9	1.2	12.8	10.7	23.5	3.7	5.0	9
2018	North Melbourne	4	20	14	16	281	267	548	66	58	0.7	0.8	14.1	13.4	27.4	3.3	2.9	15
2019	North Melbourne	4	17	10	11	222	261	483	64	49	0.6	0.6	13.1	15.4	28.4	3.8	2.9	18
2020 (Note: The 2020 season was played with 17 home-and-away matches per team (down from 22) and 16-minute quarters with time on (down from 20-minute quarters with time on) due to the impact of the COVID-19 pandemic.)	North Melbourne	4	17	4	1	186	177	363	63	50	0.2	0.1	10.9	10.4	21.4	3.7	2.9	2
2021	Geelong	4	18	4	12	157	177	334	80	49	0.2	0.7	8.7	9.8	18.6	4.4	2.7	1
2022	Geelong	4	5	1	1	41	42	83	15	19	0.2	0.2	8.2	8.4	16.6	3.0	3.8	0
Career			260	229	182	2722	2538	5260	1029	822	0.9	0.7	10.5	9.8	20.2	4.0	3.2	70

== Personal life ==
In November 2015, Higgins married partner Heidi Greig. They have a daughter named Rosie who was born in April 2018. In February 2021, the couple welcomed twins, a daughter named Emmeline and a son named Harry.

== Honours and achievements ==
- All-Australian team: 2018
- Syd Barker Medal: 2017, 2018
- Australia representative honours in International Rules Football: 2017
- Victoria representative honours in State of Origin for Bushfire Relief Match
- AFL Rising Star nominee: 2007
