= 2017 Brownlow Medal =

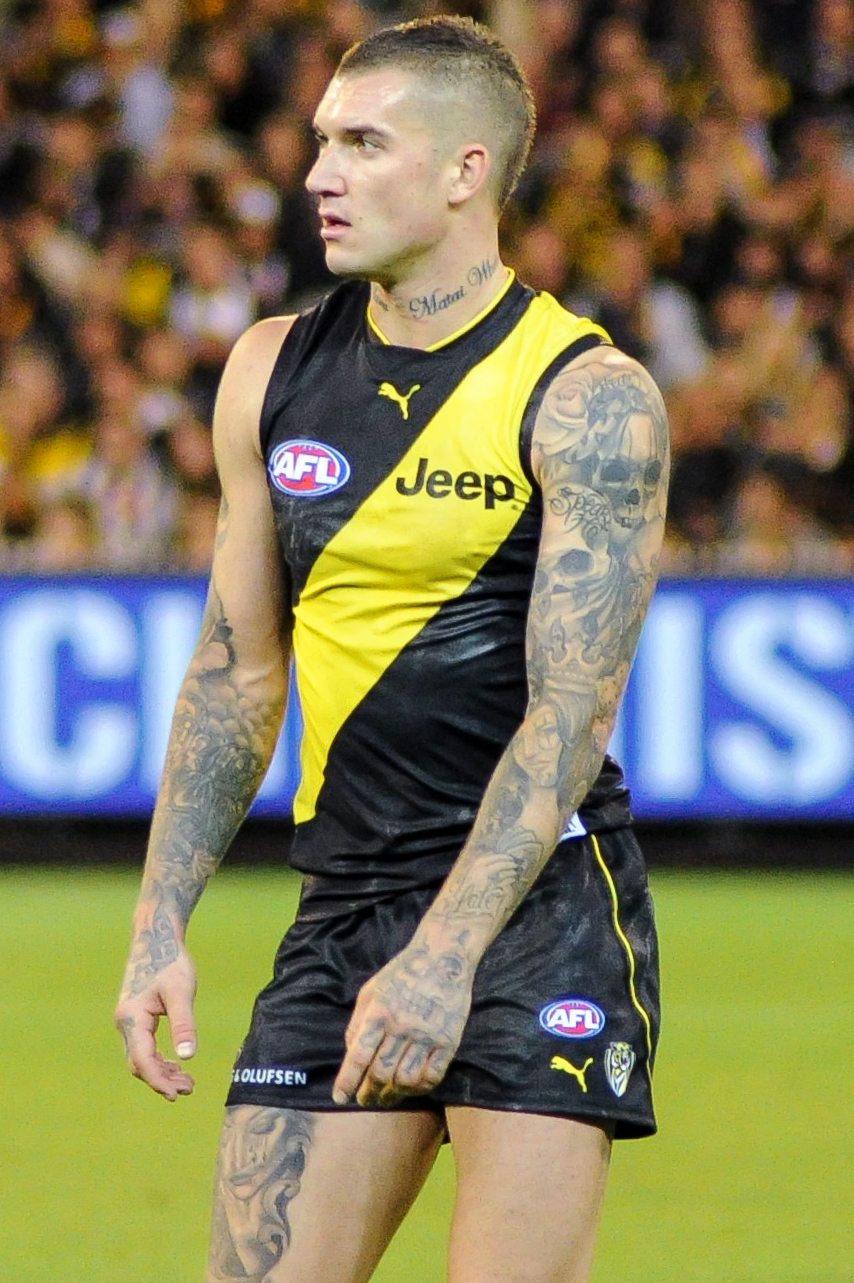
- 2017 Brownlow Medallist, Dustin Martin
- Date: 25 September
- Location: Crown Palladium
- Hosted by: Bruce McAvaney
- Winner(s): Dustin Martin; Richmond (36 votes)

Television/radio coverage
- Network: Seven Network; Telstra

The 2017 Brownlow Medal was the 90th year the award was presented to the player adjudged the fairest and best player during the Australian Football League (AFL) home and away season. Dustin Martin of the Richmond Football Club won the medal with a record-breaking 36 votes, which was tied by Ollie Wines in 2021, until it was broken by Patrick Cripps in 2024.

== Leading vote-getters ==
	Player	Votes
1st	Dustin Martin (Richmond)	36
	Patrick Dangerfield (Geelong)*	33
2nd	Tom Mitchell (Hawthorn)	25
3rd	Josh Kennedy (Sydney)	23
4th	Lance Franklin (Sydney)	22
5th	Josh Kelly (Greater Western Sydney)	21
6th	Rory Sloane (Adelaide)	20
7th	Marcus Bontempelli (Western Bulldogs)	19
8th	Ollie Wines (Port Adelaide)	18
9th	Dayne Beams (Brisbane Lions)	17
10th	Luke Parker (Sydney)	16

* The player was ineligible to win the medal due to suspension by the AFL Tribunal during the year.

== Voting procedure ==
The three field umpires (those umpires who control the flow of the game, as opposed to goal or boundary umpires) confer after each match and award three votes, two votes, and one vote to the players they regard as the best, second-best and third-best in the match, respectively. The votes are kept secret until the awards night, and they are read and tallied on the evening.

The winner of the 2017 Brownlow medal was Dustin Martin, scoring a record 36 votes to win the seasons best and fairest (which would be tied by Ollie Wines in 2021). For much of the season, Martin and 2016 winner Patrick Dangerfield (Geelong) had emerged as the stand-out midfielders in the game, and the pair had been expected to dominate the count; however, Dangerfield became ineligible for the medal in Round 19 after being suspended for one week for a dangerous tackle, leaving Martin as the short-priced favourite. In the week leading up to the count, Martin was a $1.08 favourite with bookmakers.
