= 2021 AFL season =

125th season of the Australian Football League (AFL)

2021 AFL premiership season
- Date: 16 March – 25 September 2021
- Teams: 18
- Premiers: Melbourne; 13th premiership
- Runners-up: Western Bulldogs (2nd runners-up)
- Minor premiers: Melbourne; 10th minor premiership
- Brownlow Medallist: Ollie Wines (Port Adelaide – 36 votes)
- Coleman Medallist: Harry McKay (Carlton – 58 goals)

Attendance
- Matches played: 207
- Total attendance: 3,976,228 (19,209 per match)
- Highest: 78,113 (Round 6, Collingwood vs Essendon)

The 2021 AFL season was the 125th season of the Australian Football League (AFL), the highest-level senior men's Australian rules football competition in Australia, which was known as the Victorian Football League until 1989. The season featured eighteen clubs, ran from 18 March until 25 September, and comprised a 22-game home-and-away season followed by a finals series featuring the top eight clubs.

The season was played during the second year of the COVID-19 pandemic, and saw disruptions but to a much lesser extent than the 2020 season. Virus outbreaks resulted in restrictions on crowds and the relocation of forty games outside their originally fixtured states, but the season was played without suspension and with only minor disruptions to the scheduled dates of matches.

The premiership was won by the Melbourne Football Club for the 13th time, after it defeated the Western Bulldogs by 74 points in the 2021 AFL Grand Final, which was played at Optus Stadium in Perth.

== Impact of COVID-19 pandemic ==
The season was played during the second year of the COVID-19 pandemic, with the country's vaccination roll-outs commencing around the beginning of the season. The country had largely settled into a paradigm of most states maintaining zero COVID-19 cases outside of their international travel quarantine systems; and when this was the case, it allowed matches to be played in front of crowds (albeit with reduced capacity) and unhindered interstate travel was permitted without quarantine. However, the different state governments often responded quickly to small numbers or even single virus cases being discovered in the community; this meant that border restrictions or quarantine periods were often re-imposed at short notice, impacting interstate travel for matches; and, in some cases, that city- or state-wide lockdowns were imposed within the impacted states, precluding football activities altogether. Short 'snap lockdowns', lasting between three and seven days in a given city, became a common response to the first few cases in the community as governments adopted 'Zero-COVID' policies.

The impact of the pandemic to the season's scheduled fixture was mostly limited to venue changes and matches being played behind closed doors; the dates of some fixtured games were adjusted, but none by more than a week from its original date. Unlike the 2020 season, the league sought to avoid putting clubs into long-term interstate hubs, and players were instead promised that only medium-term interstate trips would occur, with a maximum duration of three weeks before returning home. This worked across most of the league, but a months-long period of lockdown and border restrictions in Sydney during the latter part of the season meant that Sydney and Greater Western Sydney were unable to return home after Round 15, the latter spending more than ten weeks interstate in more than six different locations between then and its season ending; families and partners were able to join the players interstate after six weeks. The completion of the season was assisted by special "sterile corridor" arrangements made with several state governments, allowing clubs to fly in and out of those states from some hot zones without quarantine if the travelling party was subjected to isolation and testing requirements in their home states in the week leading up to the match. In the end, the biggest impact to the fixtured season was that the pre-finals bye week, which had been conventional since 2016, was dropped at less than two weeks' notice, and the first week of finals was brought forward, as a contingency to allow the league to respond to any unforeseen changes to border or societal restrictions during finals; at the time of the announcement, the grand final remained scheduled for its original date of Saturday 25 September, and the bye week was ultimately scheduled in the week between the preliminary finals and the grand final.

The league saw relatively few impacts through the first half of the season, with only occasional games relocated; but, as more virus cases and outbreaks occurred through winter, the second half of the season was more heavily affected with relocated games. In particular:

- Rounds 11 to 14: an outbreak in Victoria resulted in lockdown and border restrictions on Victorian clubs, precluding free entry to any state except New South Wales. Many clubs shifted games to Sydney and remained there between rounds during that period.
- Rounds 15 and 16: nationwide outbreaks in all states except Tasmania at one stage locked down all capital cities in those states, and precluded most free interstate travel in the country. All non-Victorian clubs relocated their training bases and most matches to Victoria, with only select matches able to be played interstate.
- Round 15 until the end of the season: a long period of restrictions in Sydney saw both clubs based outside New South Wales long term.
- No finals were held in Victoria. The Victorian venues were available despite a smaller outbreak in the state, having hosted home-and-away matches behind closed doors right up to the end of the season while 'sterile corridor' arrangements were in place to enable interstate travel. However, the league preferred to schedule finals which could be attended in a neutral state rather than behind closed doors in a home state.

While most matches in the season saw some level of attendance restrictions, there was a steady return to larger crowds compared to the restrictions imposed in 2020. The openness of Australia's society compared with others around the world in the first half of the season meant that the AFL was on the leading edge of a return to typical sports attendances; and at the time it was played, the attendance of 78,113 for the match between Collingwood and Essendon on Anzac Day was a world record highest attendance for a sporting event since the beginning of the pandemic. This was reversed in the second half of the season, with a return to matches being played with no spectators in many states.

== Rule changes ==
The following rule changes were made in the 2021 season:

- The maximum number of interchanges allowed was reduced from 90 to 75 per team. Like previous steps taken to reduce interchange numbers, this was designed to alleviate congested play by giving teams less fatigue management.
- The interchange bench was increased from four to five, with the fifth designated a medical substitute allowed to take the field only to replace a player deemed medically unfit to continue. Except with permission from the AFL Medical Officer, a player thus substituted off would be ineligible to play again until at least twelve days later. To be granted permission to play the injury must not be concussion, which has its own mandatory 12 day rule.
- The distance between man on the mark and the kick-off line at a kick-in was increased from 10m to 15m.
- The duration of each quarter of play was returned to 20 minutes plus time-on, as it had been since 1994. Quarters had been played at a reduced 16 minutes plus time-on in 2020, specifically as a fatigue and injury management strategy to cope with pandemic-related interruptions to the season.

Additionally, umpires were directed to use a more stringent interpretation of existing rules related to the man on the mark: the man on the mark had previously been given freedom to move laterally or make a run towards the mark, provided they did not step over the mark; but now, the player would be directed to 'stand' upon taking up the mark position, and would concede a 50-metre penalty if he left that position; he could also choose not to take up the mark, leaving him free to move provided he remained at least five metres behind the mark. This new interpretation made it more difficult for the man on the mark to influence a subsequent sequence of quick-running play, opening up freer ball movement.

== Pre-season ==
The 2021 AAMI Community Series was played before the home and away season. The competition did not have a grand final or overall winner. All matches were televised live on Fox Footy as well as on the Kayo Sports app.

The series was originally set to feature 18 matches across three weekends, with each team playing twice. However, in light of changing domestic border restrictions due to the COVID-19 pandemic, the series was reduced to one weekend in March. Victorian clubs played each other, while non-Victorian clubs were originally scheduled to play opponents from neighbouring states. Clubs were free to schedule practice matches with other clubs from their own state beforehand with AFL approval. The schedule was revised for a third time on 25 February. All teams played pre-season games within their home states, to minimise travel before the season began.

	2021 AAMI Community Series
Thursday, 4 March (7:10 pm)	Carlton 15.9 (99)	def. by	St Kilda 19.11 (125)	Marvel Stadium (crowd: 10,228)	Report
Friday, 5 March (7:10 pm)	Collingwood 11.8 (74)	def. by	Richmond 11.14 (80)	Marvel Stadium (crowd: 10,308)	Report
Saturday, 6 March (4:10 pm)	North Melbourne 12.9 (81)	def. by	Hawthorn 17.18 (120)	Arden Street Oval (crowd: 1,656)	Report
Saturday, 6 March (7:10 pm)	Geelong 12.7 (79)	def.	Essendon 9.18 (72)	GMHBA Stadium (crowd: 11,121)	Report
Sunday, 7 March (1:10 pm)	Greater Western Sydney 18.6 (114)	def.	Sydney 12.14 (86)	Giants Stadium (crowd: 3,164)	Report
Sunday, 7 March (3:40 pm)	Adelaide 6.9 (45)	def. by	Port Adelaide 17.14 (116)	Flinders University Stadium (crowd: 3,028)	Report
Sunday, 7 March (4:10 pm)	West Coast 9.13 (67)	def.	Fremantle 8.9 (57)	Optus Stadium (crowd: 20,116)	Report
Monday, 8 March (3:10 pm)	Western Bulldogs 15.16 (106)	def.	Melbourne 10.7 (67)	Marvel Stadium (crowd: 7,931)	Report
Monday, 8 March (6:10 pm)	Gold Coast 13.11 (89)	def. by	Brisbane Lions 18.9 (117)	Metricon Stadium (crowd: 1,962)	Report

== Home-and-away season ==
A full 23-round fixture for the 2021 season was released in December 2020; but dates, times and broadcasters were initially revealed only for the first six rounds, with the league intending to release the remaining dates in four-to-six weeks blocks with at least a month's notice during the season.

Through the below tables, there were many matches played before no crowd or a heavily restricted attendance, all of which were caused by the local COVID-19 conditions at the time of the match. Where the venue for the match was altered due to COVID-19 restrictions, the original venue is noted; in cases where the competing teams had a return match later in the season, the clubs sometimes swapped home games.

=== Round 1 ===
	Round 1
Thursday, 18 March (7:25 pm)	Richmond 15.15 (105)	def.	Carlton 11.14 (80)	MCG (crowd: 49,218)	Report
Friday, 19 March (7:40 pm)	Collingwood 7.11 (53)	def. by	Western Bulldogs 10.9 (69)	MCG (crowd: 46,051)	Report
Saturday, 20 March (1:45 pm)	Melbourne 11.14 (80)	def.	Fremantle 8.10 (58)	MCG (crowd: 21,365)	Report
Saturday, 20 March (4:05 pm)	Adelaide 15.13 (103)	def.	Geelong 13.13 (91)	Adelaide Oval (crowd: 26,985)	Report
Saturday, 20 March (7:25 pm)	Essendon 13.13 (91)	def. by	Hawthorn 14.8 (92)	Marvel Stadium (crowd: 25,128)	Report
Saturday, 20 March (6:45 pm)	Brisbane Lions 14.10 (94)	def. by	Sydney 19.11 (125)	Gabba (crowd: 22,762)	Report
Sunday, 21 March (1:10 pm)	North Melbourne 9.11 (65)	def. by	Port Adelaide 17.15 (117)	Marvel Stadium (crowd: 13,050)	Report
Sunday, 21 March (3:20 pm)	Greater Western Sydney 11.12 (78)	def. by	St Kilda 13.8 (86)	Giants Stadium (crowd: 5,014)	Report
Sunday, 21 March (3:10 pm)	West Coast 12.11 (83)	def.	Gold Coast 8.10 (58)	Optus Stadium (crowd: 38,493)	Report

=== Round 2 ===
	Round 2
Thursday, 25 March (7:20 pm)	Carlton 13.7 (85)	def. by	Collingwood 16.10 (106)	MCG (crowd: 51,723)	Report
Friday, 26 March (7:50 pm)	Geelong 12.9 (81)	def.	Brisbane Lions 11.14 (80)	GMHBA Stadium (crowd: 20,070)	Report
Saturday, 27 March (1:45 pm)	Sydney 18.13 (121)	def.	Adelaide 11.22 (88)	SCG (crowd: 23,946)	Report
Saturday, 27 March (4:05 pm)	Port Adelaide 18.11 (119)	def.	Essendon 9.11 (65)	Adelaide Oval (crowd: 29,978)	Report
Saturday, 27 March (7:30 pm)	St Kilda 11.7 (73)	def. by	Melbourne 12.19 (91)	Marvel Stadium (crowd: 25,903)	Report
Saturday, 27 March (7:10 pm)	Gold Coast 14.14 (98)	def.	North Melbourne 5.9 (39)	Metricon Stadium (crowd: 6,661)	Report
Sunday, 28 March (1:10 pm)	Hawthorn 7.7 (49)	def. by	Richmond 11.12 (78)	MCG (crowd: 41,051)	Report
Sunday, 28 March (3:20 pm)	Western Bulldogs 14.16 (100)	def.	West Coast 14.9 (93)	Marvel Stadium (crowd: 21,391)	Report
Sunday, 28 March (3:10 pm)	Fremantle 11.21 (87)	def.	Greater Western Sydney 7.14 (56)	Optus Stadium (crowd: 27,625)	Report

=== Round 3 ===
	Round 3 (Easter Round)
Thursday, 1 April (7:40 pm)	Collingwood 11.6 (72)	def. by	Brisbane Lions 11.7 (73)	Marvel Stadium (crowd: 28,057) (Moved from The Gabba)	Report
Friday, 2 April (4:20 pm)	North Melbourne 5.9 (39)	def. by	Western Bulldogs 25.17 (167)	Marvel Stadium (crowd: 28,483)	Report
Friday, 2 April (7:20 pm)	Adelaide 14.11 (95)	def.	Gold Coast 12.13 (85)	Adelaide Oval (crowd: 30,175)	Report
Saturday, 3 April (1:45 pm)	Richmond 10.12 (72)	def. by	Sydney 17.15 (117)	MCG (crowd: 43,637)	Report
Saturday, 3 April (4:35 pm)	Essendon 22.11 (143)	def.	St Kilda 9.14 (68)	Marvel Stadium (crowd: 29,234)	Report
Saturday, 3 April (5:10 pm)	West Coast 16.12 (108)	def.	Port Adelaide 11.5 (71)	Optus Stadium (crowd: 42,090)	Report
Sunday, 4 April (3:20 pm)	Carlton 16.13 (109)	def.	Fremantle 9.10 (64)	Marvel Stadium (crowd: 24,551)	Report
Sunday, 4 April (6:10 pm)	Greater Western Sydney 11.2 (68)	def. by	Melbourne 15.12 (102)	Manuka Oval (crowd: 9,563)	Report
Monday, 5 April (3:20 pm)	Geelong 10.9 (69)	def.	Hawthorn 9.10 (64)	MCG (crowd: 50,030)	Report
Zac Bailey (Brisbane Lions) kicked a goal after the siren to win the match against Collingwood.; Western Bulldogs set a new record for its greatest winning margin in a VFL/AFL match, winning by 128 points against North Melbourne.

=== Round 4 ===
	Round 4
Thursday, 8 April (7:20 pm)	Sydney 11.17 (83)	def.	Essendon 12.8 (80)	SCG (crowd: 28,039)	Report
Friday, 9 April (7:20 pm)	Port Adelaide 11.13 (79)	def.	Richmond 11.11 (77)	Adelaide Oval (crowd: 33,742)	Report
Saturday, 10 April (1:45 pm)	Western Bulldogs 10.13 (73)	def.	Brisbane Lions 8.6 (54)	Mars Stadium (crowd: 7,387)	Report
Saturday, 10 April (4:35 pm)	St Kilda 15.12 (102)	def.	West Coast 13.4 (82)	Marvel Stadium (crowd: 16,710)	Report
Saturday, 10 April (7:25 pm)	Gold Coast 8.11 (59)	def. by	Carlton 9.16 (70)	Metricon Stadium (crowd: 11,618)	Report
Saturday, 10 April (7:25 pm)	Collingwood 9.6 (60)	def. by	Greater Western Sydney 14.6 (90)	MCG (crowd: 29,866)	Report
Sunday, 11 April (1:10 pm)	North Melbourne 10.8 (68)	def. by	Adelaide 16.13 (109)	Marvel Stadium (crowd: 13,479)	Report
Sunday, 11 April (3:20 pm)	Melbourne 12.13 (85)	def.	Geelong 9.6 (60)	MCG (crowd: 33,728)	Report
Sunday, 11 April (2:40 pm)	Fremantle 13.18 (96)	def.	Hawthorn 12.9 (81)	Optus Stadium (crowd: 29,490)	Report

=== Round 5 ===
	Round 5
Thursday, 15 April (7:20 pm)	St Kilda 7.6 (48)	def. by	Richmond 20.14 (134)	Marvel Stadium (crowd: 32,056)	Report
Friday, 16 April (6:10 pm)	West Coast 16.7 (103)	def.	Collingwood 11.10 (76)	Optus Stadium (crowd: 54,159)	Report
Saturday, 17 April (4:35 pm)	Western Bulldogs 17.16 (118)	def.	Gold Coast 8.8 (56)	Marvel Stadium (crowd: 18,920)	Report
Saturday, 17 April (4:35 pm)	Sydney 10.9 (69)	def. by	Greater Western Sydney 9.17 (71)	SCG (crowd: 33,541)	Report
Saturday, 17 April (7:25 pm)	Carlton 9.14 (68)	def. by	Port Adelaide 15.6 (96)	MCG (crowd: 32,893)	Report
Saturday, 17 April (7:25 pm)	Brisbane Lions 15.12 (102)	def.	Essendon 6.9 (45)	Gabba (crowd: 23,544)	Report
Sunday, 18 April (12:40 pm)	Adelaide 11.6 (72)	def. by	Fremantle 12.12 (84)	Adelaide Oval (crowd: 31,454)	Report
Sunday, 18 April (3:20 pm)	Hawthorn 8.6 (54)	def. by	Melbourne 15.14 (104)	MCG (crowd: 36,337)	Report
Sunday, 18 April (4:40 pm)	Geelong 10.17 (77)	def.	North Melbourne 7.5 (47)	GMHBA Stadium (crowd: 21,282)	Report

=== Round 6 ===
	Round 6 (ANZAC Round)
Friday, 23 April (7:50 pm)	Greater Western Sydney 9.11 (65)	def. by	Western Bulldogs 15.14 (104)	Manuka Oval (crowd: 10,064)	Report
Saturday, 24 April (1:45 pm)	Geelong 21.10 (136)	def.	West Coast 5.9 (39)	GMHBA Stadium (crowd: 21,282)	Report
Saturday, 24 April (1:45 pm)	Gold Coast 15.10 (100)	def.	Sydney 9.6 (60)	Metricon Stadium (crowd: 9,819)	Report
Saturday, 24 April (4:35 pm)	Carlton 12.13 (85)	def. by	Brisbane Lions 15.13 (103)	Marvel Stadium (crowd: 29,576)	Report
Saturday, 24 April (7:25 pm)	Melbourne 12.10 (82)	def.	Richmond 6.12 (48)	MCG (crowd: 56,418)	Report
Saturday, 24 April (6:10 pm)	Fremantle 14.15 (99)	def.	North Melbourne 6.12 (48)	Optus Stadium (crowd: 0)	Report
Sunday, 25 April (12:30 pm)	Hawthorn 15.12 (102)	def.	Adelaide 16.3 (99)	University of Tasmania Stadium (crowd: 9,007)	Report
Sunday, 25 April (3:20 pm)	Collingwood 13.7 (85)	def. by	Essendon 16.13 (109)	MCG (crowd: 78,113)	Report
Sunday, 25 April (6:10 pm)	Port Adelaide 14.9 (93)	def.	St Kilda 5.9 (39)	Adelaide Oval (crowd: 33,125)	Report
Adelaide kicked an AFL record of 15 goals straight (14 of which were kicked before half time, also a record) before registering its first behind in its loss to Hawthorn.

=== Round 7 ===
	Round 7
Friday, 30 April (7:50 pm)	Richmond 11.11 (77)	def.	Western Bulldogs 7.13 (55)	MCG (crowd: 52,402)	Report
Saturday, 1 May (1:40 pm)	Adelaide 4.15 (39)	def. by	Greater Western Sydney 15.16 (106)	Adelaide Oval (crowd: 28,853)	Report
Saturday, 1 May (1:45 pm)	Collingwood 7.13 (55)	def. by	Gold Coast 12.7 (79)	MCG (crowd: 24,397)	Report
Saturday, 1 May (4:35 pm)	St Kilda 19.14 (128)	def.	Hawthorn 9.5 (59)	Marvel Stadium (crowd: 26,433)	Report
Saturday, 1 May (7:25 pm)	Sydney 14.6 (90)	def.	Geelong 12.16 (88)	SCG (crowd: 29,123)	Report
Saturday, 1 May (7:25 pm)	Brisbane Lions 13.15 (93)	def.	Port Adelaide 5.14 (44)	Gabba (crowd: 20,007)	Report
Sunday, 2 May (1:10 pm)	North Melbourne 11.7 (73)	def. by	Melbourne 16.7 (103)	Blundstone Arena (crowd: 6,009)	Report
Sunday, 2 May (3:20 pm)	Essendon 16.11 (107)	def. by	Carlton 19.9 (123)	MCG (crowd: 57,447)	Report
Sunday, 2 May (2:40 pm)	West Coast 20.12 (132)	def.	Fremantle 11.7 (73)	Optus Stadium (crowd: 0)	Report

=== Round 8 ===
	Round 8
Friday, 7 May (7:50 pm)	Richmond 9.9 (63)	def. by	Geelong 19.12 (126)	MCG (crowd: 54,857)	Report
Saturday, 8 May (1:45 pm)	Gold Coast 7.12 (54)	def. by	St Kilda 8.15 (63)	Metricon Stadium (crowd: 9,271)	Report
Saturday, 8 May (2:10 pm)	Greater Western Sydney 16.11 (107)	def.	Essendon 16.9 (105)	GIANTS Stadium (crowd: 8,526)	Report
Saturday, 8 May (4:35 pm)	North Melbourne 11.10 (76)	def. by	Collingwood 14.10 (94)	Marvel Stadium (crowd: 22,329)	Report
Saturday, 8 May (7:25 pm)	Melbourne 10.7 (67)	def.	Sydney 8.10 (58)	MCG (crowd: 35,567)	Report
Saturday, 8 May (7:10 pm)	Port Adelaide 12.15 (87)	def.	Adelaide 5.8 (38)	Adelaide Oval (crowd: 43,069)	Report
Sunday, 9 May (1:10 pm)	Hawthorn 8.12 (60)	def. by	West Coast 14.14 (98)	MCG (crowd: 15,277)	Report
Sunday, 9 May (3:20 pm)	Western Bulldogs 16.11 (107)	def.	Carlton 13.13 (91)	Marvel Stadium (crowd: 27,663)	Report
Sunday, 9 May (4:40 pm)	Brisbane Lions 14.11 (95)	def.	Fremantle 10.11 (71)	The Gabba (crowd: 15,403) (Moved from Optus Stadium)	Report

=== Round 9 ===
	Round 9
Friday, 14 May (7:50 pm)	St Kilda 5.17 (47)	def. by	Geelong 10.8 (68)	Marvel Stadium (crowd: 26,712)	Report
Saturday, 15 May (1:45 pm)	Sydney 10.12 (72)	def.	Collingwood 5.12 (42)	SCG (crowd: 31,448)	Report
Saturday, 15 May (2:10 pm)	Hawthorn 12.8 (80)	def. by	North Melbourne 13.9 (87)	University of Tasmania Stadium (crowd: 9,121)	Report
Saturday, 15 May (4:35 pm)	Gold Coast 7.9 (51)	def. by	Brisbane Lions 19.10 (124)	Metricon Stadium (crowd: 12,636)	Report
Saturday, 15 May (7:25 pm)	Richmond 13.9 (87)	def.	Greater Western Sydney 12.11 (83)	Marvel Stadium (crowd: 18,798)	Report
Saturday, 15 May (7:10 pm)	Port Adelaide 12.5 (77)	def. by	Western Bulldogs 15.6 (96)	Adelaide Oval (crowd: 32,787)	Report
Sunday, 16 May (1:10 pm)	Essendon 10.8 (68)	def.	Fremantle 8.13 (61)	Marvel Stadium (crowd: 26,357)	Report
Sunday, 16 May (3:20 pm)	Melbourne 13.16 (94)	def.	Carlton 10.8 (68)	MCG (crowd: 38,581)	Report
Sunday, 16 May (2:40 pm)	West Coast 16.10 (106)	def.	Adelaide 11.10 (76)	Optus Stadium (crowd: 43,427)	Report
North Melbourne's win was its first since Round 9, 2020, ending a 16 game losing streak. It was North Melbourne's longest losing streak since 1971–72.

=== Round 10 ===
	Round 10
Friday, 21 May (7:50 pm)	Brisbane Lions 15.12 (102)	def.	Richmond 11.8 (74)	Gabba (crowd: 31,127)	Report
Saturday, 22 May (1:45 pm)	Carlton 13.8 (86)	def.	Hawthorn 9.9 (63)	MCG (crowd: 45,741)	Report
Saturday, 22 May (2:10 pm)	Geelong 14.7 (91)	def.	Gold Coast 8.9 (57)	GMHBA Stadium (crowd: 22,055)	Report
Saturday, 22 May (4:05 pm)	Adelaide 15.6 (96)	def.	Melbourne 14.11 (95)	Adelaide Oval (crowd: 31,373)	Report
Saturday, 22 May (7:25 pm)	Western Bulldogs 21.18 (144)	def.	St Kilda 5.3 (33)	Marvel Stadium (crowd: 28,720)	Report
Saturday, 22 May (5:40 pm)	Fremantle 12.14 (86)	def.	Sydney 13.6 (84)	Optus Stadium (crowd: 29,134)	Report
Sunday, 23 May (1:10 pm)	Greater Western Sydney 13.15 (93)	def.	West Coast 11.11 (77)	GIANTS Stadium (crowd: 9,046)	Report
Sunday, 23 May (3:20 pm)	Collingwood 8.10 (58)	def. by	Port Adelaide 8.11 (59)	MCG (crowd: 23,415)	Report
Sunday, 23 May (4:40 pm)	Essendon 22.9 (141)	def.	North Melbourne 10.9 (69)	Marvel Stadium (crowd: 33,121)	Report
Melbourne suffered its first loss since Round 16, 2020, ending an 11 game winning streak.; St Kilda suffered its worst ever defeat against the Western Bulldogs, losing by 111 points.; West Coast's Shannon Hurn played his 290th game, surpassing the club's games record previously held by Dean Cox.

=== Round 11 ===
	Round 11 (Sir Doug Nicholls Round Week 1)
Friday, 28 May (7:50 pm)	Western Bulldogs 8.11 (59)	def. by	Melbourne 13.9 (87)	Marvel Stadium (crowd: 0)	Report
Saturday, 29 May (1:45 pm)	Collingwood 6.15 (51)	def. by	Geelong 8.13 (61)	MCG (crowd: 0)	Report
Saturday, 29 May (2:10 pm)	Brisbane Lions 19.15 (129)	def.	Greater Western Sydney 10.5 (65)	Gabba (crowd: 22,038)	Report
Saturday, 29 May (4:35 pm)	St Kilda 12.16 (88)	def.	North Melbourne 10.8 (68)	Marvel Stadium (crowd: 0)	Report
Saturday, 29 May (7:40 pm)	Gold Coast 17.11 (113)	def.	Hawthorn 11.10 (76)	SCG (crowd: 1,241) (Moved from TIO Stadium)	Report
Saturday, 29 May (5:40 pm)	West Coast 11.5 (71)	def. by	Essendon 12.15 (87)	Optus Stadium (crowd: 41,883)	Report
Sunday, 30 May (2:10 pm)	Richmond 17.9 (111)	def.	Adelaide 12.11 (83)	GIANTS Stadium (crowd: 4,236) (Moved from MCG)	Report
Sunday, 30 May (3:20 pm)	Sydney 15.10 (100)	def.	Carlton 11.12 (78)	SCG (crowd: 29,882)	Report
Sunday, 30 May (4:50 pm)	Port Adelaide 18.7 (115)	def.	Fremantle 9.15 (69)	Adelaide Oval (crowd: 26,759)	Report

=== Round 12 ===
	Round 12 (Sir Doug Nicholls Round Week 2)
Friday, 4 June (7:20 pm)	Melbourne 14.13 (97)	def.	Brisbane Lions 11.9 (75)	GIANTS Stadium (crowd: 3,772) (Moved from TIO Traeger Park)	Report
Saturday, 5 June (1:45 pm)	Sydney 13.14 (92)	def.	St Kilda 12.11 (83)	SCG (crowd: 19,020) (Moved from Marvel Stadium)	Report
Saturday, 5 June (4:05 pm)	Adelaide 10.13 (73)	def. by	Collingwood 12.6 (78)	Adelaide Oval (crowd: 30,446)	Report
Saturday, 5 June (5:40 pm)	Essendon 12.12 (84)	def. by	Richmond 19.9 (123)	Optus Stadium (crowd: 55,656) (Moved from MCG)	Report
Sunday, 6 June (3:20 pm)	Carlton 10.13 (73)	def. by	West Coast 14.11 (95)	SCG (crowd: 5,137) (Moved from MCG)	Report
Sunday, 6 June (4:40 pm)	Fremantle 9.11 (65)	def. by	Western Bulldogs 13.15 (93)	Optus Stadium (crowd: 32,875)	Report
	Bye; Geelong, Gold Coast, Greater Western Sydney, Hawthorn, North Melbourne, Port Adelaide

=== Round 13 ===
	Round 13
Thursday, 10 June (7:10 pm)	Port Adelaide 14.7 (91)	def. by	Geelong 17.10 (112)	Adelaide Oval (crowd: 28,718)	Report
Friday, 11 June (7:50 pm)	Sydney 7.9 (51)	def. by	Hawthorn 14.5 (89)	SCG (crowd: 25,904)	Report
Saturday, 12 June (2:15 pm)	Fremantle 11.10 (76)	def.	Gold Coast 6.13 (49)	Optus Stadium (crowd: 27,318)	Report
Saturday, 12 June (7:25 pm)	St Kilda 8.12 (60)	def. by	Adelaide 9.12 (66)	Cazalys Stadium (crowd: 5,969)	Report
Sunday, 13 June (3:20 pm)	North Melbourne 14.10 (94)	drew with	Greater Western Sydney 14.10 (94)	Blundstone Arena (crowd: 3,462)	Report
Sunday, 13 June (5:20 pm)	West Coast 13.7 (85)	def.	Richmond 12.9 (81)	Optus Stadium (crowd: 50,834)	Report
Monday, 14 June (3:20 pm)	Melbourne 9.9 (63)	def. by	Collingwood 11.14 (80)	SCG (crowd: 16,453) (Moved from MCG)	Report
	Bye; Brisbane Lions, Carlton, Essendon, Western Bulldogs
The game between West Coast and Richmond was brought forward from Round 14 to Round 13, which had been both teams' originally fixtured bye; this allowed Richmond, whose players had remained interstate since Round 11, to visit Western Australia without quarantine and then return to Victoria five days earlier than the original fixture would have allowed.; The attendance of 3,462 at the North Melbourne and Greater Western Sydney match is the lowest ever figure for a VFL/AFL fixture in Tasmania.

=== Round 14 ===
	Round 14
Friday, 18 June (7:50 pm)	Geelong 12.11 (83)	def.	Western Bulldogs 11.12 (78)	GMHBA Stadium (crowd: 6,583)	Report
Saturday, 19 June (1:45 pm)	Gold Coast 4.7 (31)	def. by	Port Adelaide 12.9 (81)	Metricon Stadium (crowd: 7,117)	Report
Saturday, 19 June (4:35 pm)	North Melbourne 6.9 (45)	def. by	Brisbane Lions 9.14 (68)	Blundstone Arena (crowd: 5,060) (Moved from Marvel Stadium)	Report
Saturday, 19 June (7:25 pm)	Greater Western Sydney 16.6 (102)	def.	Carlton 9.12 (66)	GIANTS Stadium (crowd: 7,035)	Report
Sunday, 20 June (3:20 pm)	Hawthorn 10.13 (73)	def. by	Essendon 13.8 (86)	University of Tasmania Stadium (crowd: 14,834) (Moved from MCG)	Report
	Bye; Adelaide, Collingwood, Fremantle, Melbourne, Richmond, St Kilda, Sydney, West Coast
Gary Rohan (Geelong) kicked a goal after the siren to win the game against the Western Bulldogs.

=== Round 15 ===
	Round 15
Thursday, 24 June (7:30 pm)	Brisbane Lions 13.16 (94)	def.	Geelong 7.8 (50)	Gabba (crowd: 29,024)	Report
Friday, 25 June (7:50 pm)	Richmond 2.10 (22)	def. by	St Kilda 9.8 (62)	MCG (crowd: 14,787)	Report
Saturday, 26 June (1:45 pm)	Collingwood 12.7 (79)	def. by	Fremantle 14.7 (91)	Marvel Stadium (crowd: 11,570)	Report
Saturday, 26 June (1:45 pm)	North Melbourne 9.18 (72)	def.	Gold Coast 9.9 (63)	Blundstone Arena (crowd: 6,719)	Report
Saturday, 26 June (4:05 pm)	Port Adelaide 12.9 (81)	def.	Sydney 10.11 (71)	Adelaide Oval (crowd: 29,631)	Report
Saturday, 26 June (7:25 pm)	Essendon 8.9 (57)	def. by	Melbourne 9.14 (68)	MCG (crowd: 19,414)	Report
Sunday, 27 June (1:10 pm)	Greater Western Sydney 11.6 (72)	def. by	Hawthorn 13.12 (90)	MCG (crowd: 9,897) (Moved from GIANTS Stadium)	Report
Sunday, 27 June (1:20 pm)	West Coast 6.7 (43)	def. by	Western Bulldogs 13.20 (98)	Optus Stadium (crowd: 0)	Report
Sunday, 27 June (4:10 pm)	Carlton 12.11 (83)	def.	Adelaide 10.13 (73)	Marvel Stadium (crowd: 14,930)	Report
The crowd of 9,897 between Greater Western Sydney and Hawthorn, under capacity restrictions, was the lowest for an attended AFL premiership match at the Melbourne Cricket Ground since round 21, 1992.; Richmond's score of 2.10 (22) against St Kilda was its lowest score since Round 16, 1961, and its lowest score at the MCG since the 1927 Grand Final.

=== Round 16 ===
	Round 16
Thursday, 1 July (7:20 pm)	Gold Coast 10.17 (77)	def.	Richmond 10.7 (67)	Marvel Stadium (crowd: 9,327) (Moved from Metricon Stadium)	Report
Friday, 2 July (7:50 pm)	Geelong 15.8 (98)	def.	Essendon 8.9 (57)	GMHBA Stadium (crowd: 15,579)	Report
Saturday, 3 July (1:45 pm)	Melbourne 7.13 (55)	def. by	Greater Western Sydney 9.10 (64)	MCG (crowd: 16,963)	Report
Saturday, 3 July (4:05 pm)	Adelaide 8.11 (59)	def. by	Brisbane Lions 17.9 (111)	Adelaide Oval (crowd: 16,178)	Report
Saturday, 3 July (7:40 pm)	Hawthorn 7.11 (53)	def. by	Port Adelaide 13.9 (87)	Marvel Stadium (crowd: 18,251)	Report
Saturday, 3 July (7:40 pm)	Fremantle 8.16 (64)	def. by	Carlton 12.8 (80)	MCG (crowd: 12,103) (Moved from Optus Stadium)	Report
Sunday, 4 July (1:10 pm)	Sydney 18.10 (118)	def.	West Coast 3.8 (26)	GMHBA Stadium (crowd: 9,520) (Moved from SCG)	Report
Sunday, 4 July (3:20 pm)	Collingwood 8.13 (61)	def. by	St Kilda 10.10 (70)	MCG (crowd: 18,082)	Report
Sunday, 4 July (4:40 pm)	Western Bulldogs 16.12 (108)	def.	North Melbourne 11.13 (79)	Marvel Stadium (crowd: 18,216)	Report
Shaun Burgoyne of Hawthorn became the fifth player in VFL/AFL history to play 400 games; his milestone game was played against his former club Port Adelaide.; West Coast recorded a score of 3.8 (26) against Sydney, its lowest score since Round 23, 1992.

=== Round 17 ===
	Round 17
Thursday, 8 July (7:10 pm)	Port Adelaide 8.7 (55)	def. by	Melbourne 12.14 (86)	Adelaide Oval (crowd: 30,908)	Report
Friday, 9 July (7:50 pm)	Essendon 11.18 (84)	def.	Adelaide 2.9 (21)	Marvel Stadium (crowd: 23,604)	Report
Saturday, 10 July (1:45 pm)	Hawthorn 6.10 (46)	def. by	Fremantle 16.12 (108)	University of Tasmania Stadium (crowd: 9,111)	Report
Saturday, 10 July (4:35 pm)	Carlton 5.14 (44)	def. by	Geelong 10.10 (70)	MCG (crowd: 31,834)	Report
Saturday, 10 July (7:25 pm)	Brisbane Lions 8.15 (63)	def. by	St Kilda 14.11 (95)	Metricon Stadium (crowd: 9,075) (Moved from The Gabba)	Report
Sunday, 11 July (12:40 pm)	Greater Western Sydney 9.10 (64)	def. by	Gold Coast 10.5 (65)	Mars Stadium (crowd: 2,952) (Moved from GIANTS Stadium)	Report
Sunday, 11 July (3:20 pm)	Western Bulldogs 8.12 (60)	def. by	Sydney 11.13 (79)	Marvel Stadium (crowd: 24,817)	Report
Sunday, 11 July (4:10 pm)	Richmond 11.5 (71)	def. by	Collingwood 13.9 (87)	MCG (crowd: 29,437)	Report
Monday, 12 July (5:40 pm)	West Coast 8.12 (60)	def. by	North Melbourne 10.10 (70)	Optus Stadium (crowd: 30,515)	Report
Adelaide's score of 2.9 (21) against Essendon set new records for the lowest score in Adelaide's history, and the lowest score ever by any team at Marvel Stadium, surpassing the previous mark of 3.6 (24) from Round 18, 2011, which was also scored by the Crows.

=== Round 18 ===
	Round 18
Thursday, 15 July (6:10 pm)	Fremantle 3.13 (31)	def. by	Geelong 14.16 (100)	Optus Stadium (crowd: 35,271)	Report
Friday, 16 July (8:05 pm)	Richmond 16.10 (106)	def.	Brisbane Lions 13.8 (86)	Metricon Stadium (crowd: 4,119) (Moved from MCG)	Report
Saturday, 17 July (1:45 pm)	St Kilda 8.13 (61)	def. by	Port Adelaide 10.14 (74)	Marvel Stadium (crowd: 0)	Report
Saturday, 17 July (4:35 pm)	Gold Coast 11.13 (79)	def. by	Western Bulldogs 14.6 (90)	Metricon Stadium (crowd: 8,244)	Report
Saturday, 17 July (7:25 pm)	Melbourne 11.13 (79)	drew with	Hawthorn 12.7 (79)	MCG (crowd: 0)	Report
Sunday, 18 July (12:35 pm)	North Melbourne 11.8 (74)	def. by	Essendon 13.14 (92)	Metricon Stadium (crowd: 5,114) (Moved from Marvel Stadium)	Report
Sunday, 18 July (3:20 pm)	Collingwood 9.8 (62)	def. by	Carlton 13.13 (91)	MCG (crowd: 0)	Report
Sunday, 18 July (4:10 pm)	Adelaide 8.8 (56)	def. by	West Coast 14.14 (98)	Adelaide Oval (crowd: 24,554)	Report
Sunday, 18 July (6:10 pm)	Greater Western Sydney 11.6 (72)	def. by	Sydney 15.8 (98)	Metricon Stadium (crowd: 2,374) (Moved from GIANTS Stadium)	Report

=== Round 19 ===
	Round 19
Friday, 23 July (7:15 pm)	Port Adelaide 14.13 (97)	def.	Collingwood 10.9 (69)	Marvel Stadium (crowd: 0) (Moved from Adelaide Oval)	Report
Saturday, 24 July (1:45 pm)	Carlton 11.11 (77)	def. by	North Melbourne 18.8 (116)	Marvel Stadium (crowd: 0)	Report
Saturday, 24 July (3:10 pm)	Brisbane Lions 17.18 (120)	def.	Gold Coast 10.11 (71)	Gabba (crowd: 16,660)	Report
Saturday, 24 July (2:35 pm)	West Coast 14.10 (94)	def.	St Kilda 13.8 (86)	Optus Stadium (crowd: 43,657)	Report
Saturday, 24 July (7:25 pm)	Melbourne 9.11 (65)	def. by	Western Bulldogs 13.7 (85)	MCG (crowd: 0)	Report
Saturday, 24 July (7:40 pm)	Adelaide 16.6 (102)	def.	Hawthorn 13.5 (83)	Marvel Stadium (crowd: 0) (Moved from Adelaide Oval)	Report
Sunday, 25 July (12:30 pm)	Sydney 14.14 (98)	def.	Fremantle 8.10 (58)	Metricon Stadium (crowd: 2,875) (Moved from SCG)	Report
Sunday, 25 July (3:20 pm)	Geelong 15.5 (95)	def.	Richmond 8.9 (57)	MCG (crowd: 0)	Report
Sunday, 25 July (6:10 pm)	Essendon 7.11 (53)	def. by	Greater Western Sydney 9.12 (66)	Metricon Stadium (crowd: 2,681) (Moved from Marvel Stadium)	Report

=== Round 20 ===
	Round 20
Friday, 30 July (7:50 pm)	St Kilda 12.9 (81)	def. by	Carlton 18.4 (112)	Marvel Stadium (crowd: 0)	Report
Saturday, 31 July (12:20 pm)	Western Bulldogs 15.15 (105)	def.	Adelaide 8.8 (56)	Mars Stadium (crowd: 0)	Report
Saturday, 31 July (1:15 pm)	North Melbourne 6.6 (42)	def. by	Geelong 8.14 (62)	Blundstone Arena (crowd: 8,083)	Report
Saturday, 31 July (4:15 pm)	Collingwood 14.6 (90)	def.	West Coast 6.9 (45)	MCG (crowd: 0)	Report
Sunday, 1 August (12:10 pm)	Gold Coast 4.6 (30)	def. by	Melbourne 18.20 (128)	Marvel Stadium (crowd: 0) (Moved from Metricon Stadium)	Report
Sunday, 1 August (2:10 pm)	Hawthorn 14.8 (92)	def.	Brisbane Lions 12.8 (80)	University of Tasmania Stadium (crowd: 5,381) (Moved from MCG)	Report
Sunday, 1 August (3:10 pm)	Essendon 16.6 (102)	def. by	Sydney 17.7 (109)	MCG (crowd: 0) (Moved from Marvel Stadium)	Report
Sunday, 1 August (3:10 pm)	Fremantle 7.13 (55)	def.	Richmond 6.15 (51)	Optus Stadium (crowd: 24,979)	Report
Sunday, 1 August (6:10 pm)	Greater Western Sydney 11.7 (73)	def. by	Port Adelaide 15.10 (100)	Marvel Stadium (crowd: 0) (Moved from UNSW Canberra Oval)	Report
A snap COVID-19 lockdown in Queensland, announced on the morning of Saturday 31 July and commencing the same afternoon, saw two matches – Gold Coast vs Melbourne and Essendon vs Sydney (which had previously been relocated to Queensland from Marvel Stadium) – postponed at less than a day's notice from Saturday to Sunday. Both matches were relocated to Melbourne, as was the Greater Western Sydney vs Port Adelaide match (which had previously been relocated to Queensland from UNSW Canberra Oval), which was already fixtured for Sunday.

=== Round 21 ===
	Round 21
Friday, 6 August (7:50 pm)	Geelong 8.17 (65)	def. by	Greater Western Sydney 13.6 (84)	GMHBA Stadium (crowd: 0)	Report
Saturday, 7 August (1:45 pm)	Carlton 8.9 (57)	def. by	Gold Coast 11.10 (76)	Marvel Stadium (crowd: 0)	Report
Saturday, 7 August (4:35 pm)	Richmond 13.11 (89)	def.	North Melbourne 8.8 (56)	MCG (crowd: 0)	Report
Saturday, 7 August (7:10 pm)	Adelaide 7.9 (51)	def. by	Port Adelaide 7.13 (55)	Adelaide Oval (crowd: 14,376)	Report
Saturday, 7 August (7:40 pm)	St Kilda 14.9 (93)	def.	Sydney 10.4 (64)	Marvel Stadium (crowd: 0) (Moved from SCG)	Report
Sunday, 8 August (2:10 pm)	Hawthorn 15.7 (97)	def.	Collingwood 12.6 (78)	MCG (crowd: 0)	Report
Sunday, 8 August (3:20 pm)	Western Bulldogs 12.12 (84)	def. by	Essendon 15.7 (97)	Marvel Stadium (crowd: 0)	Report
Sunday, 8 August (3:10 pm)	Fremantle 8.6 (54)	def. by	Brisbane Lions 18.10 (118)	Optus Stadium (crowd: 29,589) (Moved from The Gabba)	Report
Monday, 9 August (6:10 pm)	West Coast 9.9 (63)	def. by	Melbourne 10.12 (72)	Optus Stadium (crowd: 31,584)	Report
The match between Hawthorn and Collingwood was originally moved from the MCG to University of Tasmania Stadium to allow spectators to attend; but was returned to its original venue after a COVID-19 case was detected in Tasmania.; The match between West Coast and Melbourne was originally scheduled to be played on August 7, but was pushed back to August 9 to allow Melbourne to complete seven days of quarantine in Western Australia.; The match between West Coast and Melbourne was suspended early in the final quarter under the lightning policy, and when the game resumed 29 minutes later, it was played to its full length.

=== Round 22 ===
	Round 22
Friday, 13 August (7:50 pm)	Greater Western Sydney 16.10 (106)	def.	Richmond 10.7 (67)	Marvel Stadium (crowd: 0) (Moved from GIANTS Stadium)	Report
Saturday, 14 August (1:45 pm)	Hawthorn 9.10 (64)	def.	Western Bulldogs 5.7 (37)	University of Tasmania Stadium (crowd: 7,822)	Report
Saturday, 14 August (4:05 pm)	Port Adelaide 21.14 (140)	def.	Carlton 5.15 (45)	Adelaide Oval (crowd: 13,943)	Report
Saturday, 14 August (4:35 pm)	Geelong 13.7 (85)	def.	St Kilda 11.5 (71)	GMHBA Stadium (crowd: 0)	Report
Saturday, 14 August (7:25 pm)	Brisbane Lions 22.10 (142)	def.	Collingwood 8.9 (57)	Gabba (crowd: 15,146) (Moved from Marvel Stadium)	Report
Saturday, 14 August (7:40 pm)	North Melbourne 12.5 (77)	def. by	Sydney 13.13 (91)	Marvel Stadium (crowd: 0)	Report
Sunday, 15 August (2:10 pm)	Melbourne 16.8 (104)	def.	Adelaide 9.9 (63)	MCG (crowd: 0)	Report
Sunday, 15 August (3:20 pm)	Gold Coast 4.6 (30)	def. by	Essendon 14.14 (98)	GMHBA Stadium (crowd: 0) (Moved from Metricon Stadium)	Report
Sunday, 15 August (3:10 pm)	Fremantle 12.7 (79)	def.	West Coast 9.10 (64)	Optus Stadium (crowd: 51,692)	Report
Fremantle ended an 11-game Western Derby losing streak against West Coast.

=== Round 23 ===
	Round 23
Friday, 20 August (7:50 pm)	Western Bulldogs 10.4 (64)	def. by	Port Adelaide 9.12 (66)	Marvel Stadium (crowd: 0)	Report
Saturday, 21 August (1:35 pm)	Richmond 12.11 (83)	drew with	Hawthorn 12.11 (83)	MCG (crowd: 0)	Report
Saturday, 21 August (1:45 pm)	Sydney 21.10 (136)	def.	Gold Coast 6.13 (49)	Marvel Stadium (crowd: 0) (Moved from SCG)	Report
Saturday, 21 August (4:35 pm)	Brisbane Lions 19.11 (125)	def.	West Coast 13.9 (87)	Gabba (crowd: 21,845)	Report
Saturday, 21 August (7:25 pm)	Geelong 12.5 (77)	def. by	Melbourne 12.9 (81)	GMHBA Stadium (crowd: 0)	Report
Saturday, 21 August (7:40 pm)	Carlton 11.9 (75)	def. by	Greater Western Sydney 12.17 (89)	Marvel Stadium (crowd: 0)	Report
Sunday, 22 August (12:15 pm)	St Kilda 17.5 (107)	def.	Fremantle 6.13 (49)	Blundstone Arena (crowd: 3,082) (Moved from Marvel Stadium)	Report
Sunday, 22 August (3:20 pm)	Essendon 16.6 (102)	def.	Collingwood 9.10 (64)	MCG (crowd: 0)	Report
Sunday, 22 August (4:10 pm)	Adelaide 13.20 (98)	def.	North Melbourne 8.6 (54)	Adelaide Oval (crowd: 13,103)	Report
Max Gawn kicked a goal after the siren to win the game for Melbourne against Geelong, after trailing by 44 points midway through the third quarter. In doing so, Melbourne secured the minor premiership. It was the first time that the minor premiership was not confirmed until after the siren in the final round since Round 22, 1987. It was also the first time Melbourne had kicked a goal after the siren to win a game.

=== Season notes ===
- Melbourne won its first nine games of the season, its best unbeaten start to a season since 1956.
- North Melbourne 'won' the wooden spoon, their 14th total and their first since 1972. They were only the 8th team in VFL/AFL history to finish last on the ladder after every round of the home-and-away season (and the first since 2008).
- Melbourne won the minor premiership for the first time since 1964. Melbourne also won the McClelland Trophy for the first time since 1990 for finishing first.
- West Coast missed the AFL finals for the first time since 2014.

== Win/loss table ==
Team	1	2	3	4	5	6	7	8	9	10	11	12	13	14	15	16	17	18	19	20	21	22	23	F1	F2	F3	GF	Ladder
Adelaide	**Geel** **+12**	Syd −33	**GCS** **+10**	NM +41	**Frem** **−12**	Haw −3	**GWS** **−67**	PA −49	WCE −30	**Melb** **+1**	Rich −28	**Coll** **−5**	StK +6	X	Carl −10	**BL** **−52**	Ess −63	**WCE** **−42**	**Haw** **+19**	WB −49	**PA** **−4**	Melb −41	**NM** **+44**	X	X	X	X	15
Brisbane Lions	**Syd** **−31**	Geel −1	Coll +1	WB −19	**Ess** **+57**	Carl +18	**PA** **+49**	**Frem** **+24**	GCS +73	**Rich** **+28**	**GWS** **+64**	Melb −22	X	NM +23	**Geel** **+44**	Adel +52	**StK** **−32**	Rich −20	**GCS** **+49**	Haw −12	Frem +64	**Coll** **+85**	**WCE** **+38**	Melb −33	**WB** **−1**	X	X	**4 (5)**
Carlton	Rich −25	**Coll** **−21**	**Frem** **+45**	GCS +11	**PA** **−28**	**BL** **−18**	Ess +16	WB −16	Melb −26	**Haw** **+23**	Syd −22	**WCE** **−22**	X	GWS −36	**Adel** **+10**	Frem +16	**Geel** **−26**	Coll +29	**NM** **−39**	StK +31	**GCS** **−19**	PA −95	**GWS** **−14**	X	X	X	X	13
Collingwood	**WB** **−16**	Carl +21	**BL** **−1**	**GWS** **−30**	WCE −27	**Ess** **−24**	**GCS** **−24**	NM +18	Syd −30	**PA** **−1**	**Geel** **−10**	Adel +5	Melb +17	X	**Frem** **−12**	**StK** **−9**	Rich +16	**Carl** **−29**	PA −28	**WCE** **+45**	Haw −19	BL −85	Ess −38	X	X	X	X	17
Essendon	**Haw** **−1**	PA −54	**StK** **+75**	Syd −3	BL −57	Coll +24	**Carl** **−16**	GWS −2	**Frem** **+7**	**NM** **+72**	WCE +16	**Rich** **−39**	X	Haw +13	**Melb** **−11**	Geel −41	**Adel** **+63**	NM +18	**GWS** **−13**	**Syd** **−7**	WB +13	GCS +68	**Coll** **+38**	WB −49	X	X	X	**8 (8)**
Fremantle	Melb −22	**GWS** **+31**	Carl −45	**Haw** **+15**	Adel +12	**NM** **+51**	WCE −59	BL −24	Ess −7	**Syd** **+2**	PA −46	**WB** **−28**	**GCS** **+27**	X	Coll +12	**Carl** **−16**	Haw +62	**Geel** **−69**	Syd −40	**Rich** **+4**	**BL** **−64**	**WCE** **+15**	StK −58	X	X	X	X	11
Geelong	Adel −12	**BL** **+1**	**Haw** **+5**	Melb −25	**NM** **+30**	**WCE** **+97**	Syd −2	Rich +63	StK +21	**GCS** **+34**	Coll +10	X	PA +21	**WB** **+5**	BL −44	**Ess** **+41**	Carl +26	Frem +69	**Rich** **+38**	NM +20	**GWS** **−19**	**StK** **+14**	**Melb** **−4**	PA −43	**GWS** **+35**	Melb −83	X	**3 (4)**
Gold Coast	WCE −25	**NM** **+59**	Adel −10	**Carl** **−11**	WB −62	**Syd** **+40**	Coll +24	**StK** **−9**	**BL** **−73**	Geel −34	**Haw** **+37**	X	Frem −27	**PA** **−50**	NM −9	**Rich** **+10**	GWS +1	**WB** **−11**	BL −49	**Melb** **−98**	Carl +19	**Ess** **−68**	Syd −87	X	X	X	X	16
Greater Western Sydney	**StK** **−8**	Frem −31	**Melb** **−34**	Coll +30	Syd +2	**WB** **−39**	Adel +67	**Ess** **+2**	Rich −4	**WCE** **+16**	BL −64	X	NM; 0	**Carl** **+36**	**Haw** **−18**	Melb +9	**GCS** **−1**	**Syd** **−26**	Ess +13	**PA** **−27**	Geel +19	**Rich** **+39**	Carl +14	Syd +1	Geel −35	X	X	**7 (6)**
Hawthorn	Ess +1	**Rich** **−29**	Geel −5	Frem −15	**Melb** **−50**	**Adel** **+3**	StK −69	**WCE** **−38**	**NM** **−7**	Carl −23	GCS −37	X	Syd +38	**Ess** **−13**	GWS +18	**PA** **−34**	**Frem** **−62**	Melb; 0	Adel −19	**BL** **+12**	**Coll** **+19**	**WB** **+27**	Rich; 0	X	X	X	X	14
Melbourne	**Frem** **+22**	StK +18	GWS +34	**Geel** **+25**	Haw +50	**Rich** **+34**	NM +30	**Syd** **+9**	**Carl** **+26**	Adel −1	WB +28	**BL** **+22**	**Coll** **−17**	X	Ess +11	**GWS** **−9**	PA +31	**Haw**; **0**	**WB** **−20**	GCS +98	WCE +9	**Adel** **+41**	Geel +4	**BL** **+33**	X	**Geel** **+83**	**WB** **+74**	**1 (1)**
North Melbourne	**PA** **−52**	GCS −59	**WB** **−128**	**Adel** **−41**	Geel −30	Frem −51	**Melb** **−30**	**Coll** **−18**	Haw +7	Ess −72	StK −20	X	**GWS**; **0**	**BL** **−23**	**GCS** **+9**	WB −29	WCE +10	**Ess** **−18**	Carl +39	**Geel** **−20**	Rich −33	**Syd** **−14**	Adel −44	X	X	X	X	18
Port Adelaide	NM +52	**Ess** **+54**	WCE −37	**Rich** **+2**	Carl +28	**StK** **+54**	BL −49	**Adel** **+49**	**WB** **−19**	Coll +1	**Frem** **+46**	X	**Geel** **−21**	GCS +50	**Syd** **+10**	Haw +34	**Melb** **−31**	StK +13	**Coll** **+28**	GWS +27	Adel +4	**Carl** **+95**	WB +2	**Geel** **+43**	X	**WB** **−71**	X	**2 (3)**
Richmond	**Carl** **+25**	Haw +29	**Syd** **−45**	PA −2	StK +86	Melb −34	**WB** **+22**	**Geel** **−63**	**GWS** **+4**	BL −28	**Adel** **+28**	Ess +39	WCE −4	X	**StK** **−40**	GCS −10	**Coll** **−16**	**BL** **+20**	Geel −38	Frem −4	**NM** **+33**	GWS −39	**Haw**; **0**	X	X	X	X	12
St Kilda	GWS +8	**Melb** **−18**	Ess −75	**WCE** **+20**	**Rich** **−86**	PA −54	**Haw** **+69**	GCS +9	**Geel** **−21**	WB −111	**NM** **+20**	Syd −9	**Adel** **−6**	X	Rich +40	Coll +9	BL +32	**PA** **−13**	WCE −8	**Carl** **−31**	**Syd** **+29**	Geel −14	**Frem** **+58**	X	X	X	X	10
Sydney	BL +31	**Adel** **+33**	Rich +45	**Ess** **+3**	**GWS** **−2**	GCS −40	**Geel** **+2**	Melb −9	**Coll** **+30**	Frem −2	**Carl** **+22**	**StK** **+9**	**Haw** **−38**	X	PA −10	**WCE** **+92**	WB +19	GWS +26	**Frem** **+40**	Ess +7	StK −29	NM +14	**GCS** **+87**	**GWS** **−1**	X	X	X	**6 (7)**
West Coast	**GCS** **+25**	WB −7	**PA** **+37**	StK −20	**Coll** **+27**	Geel −97	**Frem** **+59**	Haw +38	**Adel** **+30**	GWS −16	**Ess** **−16**	Carl +22	**Rich** **+4**	X	**WB** **−55**	Syd −92	**NM** **−10**	Adel +42	**StK** **+8**	Coll −45	**Melb** **−9**	Frem −15	BL −38	X	X	X	X	9
Western Bulldogs	Coll +16	**WCE** **+7**	NM +128	**BL** **+19**	**GCS** **+62**	GWS +39	Rich −22	**Carl** **+16**	PA +19	**StK** **+111**	**Melb** **−28**	Frem +28	X	Geel −5	WCE +55	**NM** **+29**	**Syd** **−19**	GCS +11	Melb +20	**Adel** **+49**	**Ess** **−13**	Haw −27	**PA** **−2**	**Ess** **+49**	BL +1	PA +71	Melb −74	**5 (2)**
Team	1	2	3	4	5	6	7	8	9	10	11	12	13	14	15	16	17	18	19	20	21	22	23	F1	F2	F3	GF	Ladder

+	Win	Qualified for finals
−	Loss	Eliminated

Bold – Home game
X – Bye
Opponent for round listed above margin

== Ladder ==
Pos	Team	Pld	W	L	D	PF	PA	PP	Pts	Qualification
1	Melbourne (P)	22	17	4	1	1888	1443	130.8	70	Finals series
2	Port Adelaide	22	17	5	0	1884	1492	126.3	68	Finals series
3	Geelong	22	16	6	0	1845	1456	126.7	64	Finals series
4	Brisbane Lions	22	15	7	0	2131	1599	133.3	60	Finals series
5	Western Bulldogs	22	15	7	0	1994	1501	132.8	60	Finals series
6	Sydney	22	15	7	0	1986	1656	119.9	60	Finals series
7	Greater Western Sydney	22	11	10	1	1768	1773	99.7	46	Finals series
8	Essendon	22	11	11	0	1953	1790	109.1	44	Finals series
9	West Coast	22	10	12	0	1752	1880	93.2	40	
10	St Kilda	22	10	12	0	1644	1796	91.5	40	
11	Fremantle	22	10	12	0	1578	1825	86.5	40	
12	Richmond	22	9	12	1	1743	1780	97.9	38	
13	Carlton	22	8	14	0	1746	1972	88.5	32	
14	Hawthorn	22	7	13	2	1629	1912	85.2	32	
15	Adelaide	22	7	15	0	1616	1971	82.0	28	
16	Gold Coast	22	7	15	0	1430	1863	76.8	28	
17	Collingwood	22	6	16	0	1557	1818	85.6	24	
18	North Melbourne	22	4	17	1	1458	2075	70.3	18	

Updated to match(es) played on 21 August 2021. Source: AFL
Rules for classification: 1) points; 2) percentage; 3) number of points for.
(P) Premiers

=== Ladder progression ===
- Numbers highlighted in green indicates the team finished the round inside the top 8.
- Numbers highlighted in blue indicates the team finished in first place on the ladder in that round.
- Numbers highlighted in red indicates the team finished in last place on the ladder in that round.
- Underlined numbers indicates the team did not play during that round, either due to a bye or a postponed game.
- Subscript numbers indicate ladder position at round's end.

Points by round
Team ╲ Round	1	2	3	4	5	6	7	8	9	10	11	12	13	14	15	16	17	18	19	20	21	22	23
Melbourne	4_{3}	8_{4}	12_{3}	16_{2}	20_{2}	24_{2}	28_{1}	32_{1}	36_{1}	36_{2}	40_{1}	44_{1}	44_{1}	44_{1}	48_{1}	48_{2}	52_{1}	54_{1}	54_{3}	58_{3}	62_{1}	66_{1}	70_{1}
Port Adelaide	4_{1}	8_{1}	8_{4}	12_{4}	16_{4}	20_{3}	20_{3}	24_{3}	24_{5}	28_{5}	32_{5}	32_{5}	32_{5}	36_{5}	40_{4}	44_{4}	44_{5}	48_{4}	52_{4}	56_{4}	60_{4}	64_{3}	68_{2}
Geelong	0_{12}	4_{11}	8_{7}	8_{10}	12_{8}	16_{4}	16_{5}	20_{4}	24_{3}	28_{3}	32_{4}	32_{3}	36_{3}	40_{3}	40_{5}	44_{5}	48_{3}	52_{3}	56_{2}	60_{2}	60_{3}	64_{2}	64_{3}
Brisbane Lions	0_{15}	0_{14}	4_{13}	4_{16}	8_{10}	12_{8}	16_{7}	20_{5}	24_{4}	28_{4}	32_{3}	32_{4}	32_{4}	36_{4}	40_{3}	44_{3}	44_{4}	44_{4}	48_{5}	48_{6}	52_{5}	56_{5}	60_{4}
Western Bulldogs	4_{6}	8_{5}	12_{1}	16_{1}	20_{1}	24_{1}	24_{2}	28_{2}	32_{2}	36_{1}	36_{2}	40_{2}	40_{2}	40_{2}	44_{2}	48_{1}	48_{2}	52_{2}	56_{1}	60_{1}	60_{2}	60_{4}	60_{5}
Sydney	4_{4}	8_{3}	12_{2}	16_{3}	16_{3}	16_{5}	20_{4}	20_{6}	24_{6}	24_{6}	28_{6}	32_{6}	32_{6}	32_{6}	32_{6}	36_{6}	40_{6}	44_{6}	48_{6}	52_{5}	52_{6}	56_{6}	60_{6}
Greater Western Sydney	0_{11}	0_{16}	0_{17}	4_{15}	8_{12}	8_{14}	12_{11}	16_{9}	16_{9}	20_{8}	20_{10}	20_{10}	22_{10}	26_{9}	26_{10}	30_{8}	30_{10}	30_{12}	34_{8}	34_{9}	38_{8}	42_{7}	46_{7}
Essendon	0_{10}	0_{17}	4_{10}	4_{12}	4_{14}	8_{12}	8_{15}	8_{15}	12_{12}	16_{11}	20_{9}	20_{9}	20_{11}	24_{10}	24_{11}	24_{12}	28_{11}	32_{8}	32_{9}	32_{10}	36_{9}	40_{8}	44_{8}
West Coast	4_{2}	4_{7}	8_{5}	8_{6}	12_{6}	12_{10}	16_{8}	20_{7}	24_{7}	24_{7}	24_{7}	28_{7}	32_{7}	32_{7}	32_{7}	32_{7}	32_{8}	36_{7}	40_{7}	40_{7}	40_{7}	40_{9}	40_{9}
St Kilda	4_{8}	4_{10}	4_{16}	8_{11}	8_{13}	8_{16}	12_{14}	16_{11}	16_{11}	16_{14}	20_{12}	20_{12}	20_{13}	20_{13}	24_{12}	28_{11}	32_{9}	32_{11}	32_{12}	32_{13}	36_{11}	36_{12}	40_{10}
Fremantle	0_{16}	4_{8}	4_{15}	8_{9}	12_{9}	16_{6}	16_{9}	16_{10}	16_{10}	20_{10}	20_{11}	20_{11}	24_{9}	24_{11}	28_{9}	28_{10}	32_{7}	32_{10}	32_{11}	36_{8}	36_{12}	40_{10}	40_{11}
Richmond	4_{5}	8_{2}	8_{6}	8_{8}	12_{5}	12_{7}	16_{6}	16_{8}	20_{8}	20_{9}	24_{8}	28_{8}	28_{8}	28_{8}	28_{8}	28_{9}	28_{12}	32_{9}	32_{10}	32_{11}	36_{10}	36_{11}	38_{12}
Carlton	0_{14}	0_{15}	4_{12}	8_{7}	8_{11}	8_{13}	12_{12}	12_{13}	12_{13}	16_{12}	16_{13}	16_{14}	16_{14}	16_{14}	20_{13}	24_{13}	24_{13}	28_{13}	28_{13}	32_{12}	32_{13}	32_{13}	32_{13}
Hawthorn	4_{9}	4_{13}	4_{14}	4_{17}	4_{17}	8_{15}	8_{16}	8_{17}	8_{17}	8_{17}	8_{17}	8_{17}	12_{17}	12_{17}	16_{17}	16_{17}	16_{17}	18_{17}	18_{17}	22_{17}	26_{15}	30_{14}	32_{14}
Adelaide	4_{7}	4_{12}	8_{8}	12_{5}	12_{7}	12_{9}	12_{13}	12_{14}	12_{15}	16_{13}	16_{15}	16_{15}	20_{12}	20_{12}	20_{14}	20_{15}	20_{16}	20_{16}	24_{15}	24_{16}	24_{17}	24_{17}	28_{15}
Gold Coast	0_{17}	4_{6}	4_{9}	4_{13}	4_{15}	8_{11}	12_{10}	12_{12}	12_{14}	12_{15}	16_{14}	16_{13}	16_{15}	16_{16}	16_{16}	20_{14}	24_{14}	24_{14}	24_{14}	24_{15}	28_{14}	28_{15}	28_{16}
Collingwood	0_{13}	4_{9}	4_{11}	4_{14}	4_{16}	4_{17}	4_{17}	8_{16}	8_{16}	8_{16}	8_{16}	12_{16}	16_{16}	16_{15}	16_{15}	16_{16}	20_{15}	20_{15}	20_{16}	24_{14}	24_{16}	24_{16}	24_{17}
North Melbourne	0_{18}	0_{18}	0_{18}	0_{18}	0_{18}	0_{18}	0_{18}	0_{18}	4_{18}	4_{18}	4_{18}	4_{18}	6_{18}	6_{18}	10_{18}	10_{18}	14_{18}	14_{18}	18_{18}	18_{18}	18_{18}	18_{18}	18_{18}

Source: AFL Tables

=== Positions of teams round by round ===
View source data.

== Finals series ==
Qualifying and elimination finals
28 Aug, Adelaide Oval
1	Melbourne	13.15 (93)
4	Brisbane Lions	9.6 (60)
29 Aug, University of Tasmania Stadium
5	Western Bulldogs	13.7 (85)
8	Essendon	4.12 (36)
28 Aug, University of Tasmania Stadium
6	Sydney	10.13 (73)
7	Greater Western Sydney	11.8 (74)
27 Aug, Adelaide Oval
2	Port Adelaide	12.14 (86)
3	Geelong	5.13 (43)

Semi-finals
4 Sep, Gabba
Brisbane Lions	11.12 (78)
Western Bulldogs	11.13 (79)
3 Sep, Optus Stadium
Geelong	15.13 (103)
Greater Western Sydney	10.8 (68)

Preliminary finals
10 Sep, Optus Stadium
Melbourne	19.11 (125)
Geelong	6.6 (42)
11 Sep, Adelaide Oval
Port Adelaide	6.9 (45)
Western Bulldogs	17.14 (116)

Grand final
25 Sep, Optus Stadium
Melbourne	21.14 (140)
Western Bulldogs	10.6 (66)

=== Week one ===
	Qualifying finals
QF2: Friday, 27 August (7:20 pm)	Port Adelaide 12.14 (86)	def.	Geelong 5.13 (43)	Adelaide Oval (crowd: 19,712)	Report
QF1: Saturday, 28 August (7:00 pm)	Melbourne 13.15 (93)	def.	Brisbane Lions 9.6 (60)	Adelaide Oval (crowd: 13,784)	Report

	Elimination finals
EF2: Saturday, 28 August (3:20 pm)	Sydney 10.13 (73)	def. by	Greater Western Sydney 11.8 (74)	University of Tasmania Stadium (crowd: 8,635)	Report
EF1: Sunday, 29 August (3:20 pm)	Western Bulldogs 13.7 (85)	def.	Essendon 4.12 (36)	University of Tasmania Stadium (crowd: 9,760)	Report
Tasmania hosted its first AFL finals games with University of Tasmania Stadium in Launceston hosting both elimination finals.

=== Week two ===
	Semi-finals
SF2: Friday, 3 September (5:50 pm)	Geelong 15.13 (103)	def.	Greater Western Sydney 10.8 (68)	Optus Stadium (crowd: 44,091)	Report
SF1: Saturday, 4 September (7:20 pm)	Brisbane Lions 11.12 (78)	def. by	Western Bulldogs 11.13 (79)	Gabba (crowd: 30,647)	Report
Geelong's Joel Selwood played his 333rd game, surpassing the club's games record previously held by Corey Enright.

=== Week three ===
	Preliminary finals
PF1: Friday, 10 September (5:50 pm)	Melbourne 19.11 (125)	def.	Geelong 6.6 (42)	Optus Stadium (crowd: 58,599)	Report
PF2: Saturday, 11 September (7:10 pm)	Port Adelaide 6.9 (45)	def. by	Western Bulldogs 17.14 (116)	Adelaide Oval (crowd: 26,400)	Report
Melbourne defeated Geelong by 83 points, its greatest winning margin ever against Geelong.

=== Week four ===
	Grand final
Saturday, 25 September (5:15 pm)	Melbourne 21.14 (140)	def.	Western Bulldogs 10.6 (66)	Optus Stadium (crowd: 61,118)	Report
Owing to a COVID-19 lockdown preventing the match from being played with a crowd at the Melbourne Cricket Ground, the match was staged at Optus Stadium in Perth. The second year in a row that saw the AFL Grand Final played outside of Melbourne.; Melbourne won their first premiership in 57 years, ending the longest active premiership drought and the fourth longest in VFL/AFL history.

== Club leadership ==
Club	Coach	Captain(s)	Vice-captain(s)	Leadership group	Ref.
Adelaide	Matthew Nicks	Rory Sloane		Matt Crouch, Tom Doedee, Tom Lynch, Brodie Smith	
Brisbane Lions	Chris Fagan	Dayne Zorko	Harris Andrews	Jarrod Berry, Darcy Gardiner, Ryan Lester, Jarryd Lyons, Lincoln McCarthy, Hugh McCluggage, Lachie Neale, Daniel Rich	
Carlton	David Teague	Patrick Cripps; Sam Docherty			
Collingwood	Nathan Buckley (round 1–13); Robert Harvey (round 15–)	Scott Pendlebury	Taylor Adams, Jeremy Howe, Steele Sidebottom	Brodie Grundy, Darcy Moore, Jordan Roughead	
Essendon	Ben Rutten	Dyson Heppell	Michael Hurley, Andrew McGrath, Zach Merrett		
Fremantle	Justin Longmuir	Nathan Fyfe		Andrew Brayshaw, Reece Conca, David Mundy, Alex Pearce, Michael Walters	
Geelong	Chris Scott	Joel Selwood	Mark Blicavs, Patrick Dangerfield	Mitch Duncan, Mark O'Connor, Tom Stewart, Zach Tuohy	
Gold Coast	Stuart Dew	David Swallow; Jarrod Witts	Sam Collins, Touk Miller		
Greater Western Sydney	Leon Cameron	Stephen Coniglio	Toby Greene	Phil Davis, Matt de Boer, Jacob Hopper, Josh Kelly, Lachie Whitfield	
Hawthorn	Alastair Clarkson	Ben McEvoy	Jaeger O'Meara	Jack Gunston, Tom Mitchell, Liam Shiels, James Worpel	
Melbourne	Simon Goodwin	Max Gawn	Jack Viney		
North Melbourne	David Noble	Jack Ziebell	Luke McDonald, Jy Simpkin	Ben Cunnington, Robbie Tarrant, Kayne Turner	
Port Adelaide	Ken Hinkley	Tom Jonas	Ollie Wines	Darcy Byrne-Jones, Hamish Hartlett	
Richmond	Damien Hardwick	Trent Cotchin	Jack Riewoldt, Shane Edwards		
St Kilda	Brett Ratten	Jarryn Geary; Jack Steele	Dougal Howard, Tim Membrey	Jack Billings, Sebastian Ross, Callum Wilkie	
Sydney	John Longmire	Josh Kennedy; Luke Parker; Dane Rampe		Harry Cunningham, Lance Franklin, Jake Lloyd, Callum Mills, Tom Papley	
West Coast	Adam Simpson	Luke Shuey	Jeremy McGovern	Josh Kennedy, Nic Naitanui	
Western Bulldogs	Luke Beveridge	Marcus Bontempelli	Mitch Wallis		

== Awards ==
=== Major awards ===
- The Norm Smith Medal was awarded to Melbourne's Christian Petracca.
- The Brownlow Medal was awarded to Port Adelaide's Ollie Wines.
- The Leigh Matthews Trophy was awarded to the Western Bulldogs' Marcus Bontempelli.
- The Coleman Medal was awarded to Carlton's Harry McKay.
- The Goal of the Year was awarded to Fremantle's Caleb Serong.
- The Mark of the Year was awarded to Richmond's Shai Bolton.
- The AFL Rising Star was awarded to Melbourne's Luke Jackson.

=== Coleman Medal ===
- Numbers highlighted in blue indicates the player led the Coleman Medal at the end of that round.
- Numbers underlined indicates the player did not play in that round.

	Player	1	2	3	4	5	6	7	8	9	10	11	12	13	14	15	16	17	18	19	20	21	22	23	Total
1	Harry McKay	2_{2}	4_{6}	7_{13}	2_{15}	1_{16}	6_{22}	4_{26}	4_{30}	3_{33}	2_{35}	3_{38}	0_{38}	0_{38}	3_{41}	2_{43}	3_{46}	2_{48}	4_{52}	0_{52}	5_{57}	1_{58}	0_{58}	0_{58}	58
2	Tom Hawkins	2_{2}	3_{5}	2_{7}	2_{9}	1_{10}	3_{13}	1_{14}	4_{18}	2_{20}	2_{22}	3_{25}	0_{25}	4_{29}	1_{30}	1_{31}	6_{37}	0_{37}	4_{41}	4_{45}	1_{46}	1_{47}	3_{50}	4_{54}	54
3	Jack Riewoldt	4_{4}	4_{8}	1_{9}	3_{12}	5_{17}	2_{19}	1_{20}	1_{21}	1_{22}	3_{25}	5_{30}	2_{32}	2_{34}	0_{34}	0_{34}	1_{35}	1_{36}	6_{42}	2_{44}	1_{45}	2_{47}	1_{48}	3_{51}	51
4	Taylor Walker	5_{5}	6_{11}	6_{17}	3_{20}	2_{22}	3_{25}	2_{27}	0_{27}	0_{27}	3_{30}	4_{34}	2_{36}	1_{37}	0_{37}	3_{40}	1_{41}	0_{41}	1_{42}	4_{46}	2_{48}	0_{48}	0_{48}	0_{48}	48
4	Josh Bruce	1_{1}	3_{4}	10_{14}	1_{15}	2_{17}	2_{19}	1_{20}	5_{25}	2_{27}	3_{30}	3_{33}	1_{34}	0_{34}	3_{37}	0_{37}	2_{39}	1_{40}	1_{41}	2_{43}	2_{45}	3_{48}	0_{48}	0_{48}	48
4	Lance Franklin	0_{0}	3_{3}	0_{3}	3_{6}	5_{11}	0_{11}	0_{11}	0_{11}	2_{13}	6_{19}	3_{22}	2_{24}	1_{25}	0_{25}	4_{29}	3_{32}	1_{33}	4_{37}	2_{39}	2_{41}	1_{42}	0_{42}	6_{48}	48
7	Bayley Fritsch	2_{2}	1_{3}	3_{6}	4_{10}	0_{10}	2_{12}	6_{18}	0_{18}	3_{21}	1_{22}	3_{25}	2_{27}	1_{28}	0_{28}	0_{28}	0_{31}	1_{32}	3_{35}	2_{37}	2_{39}	0_{39}	7_{46}	1_{47}	47
7	Charlie Cameron	0_{0}	2_{2}	2_{4}	0_{4}	1_{5}	3_{8}	4_{12}	3_{15}	3_{18}	1_{19}	1_{20}	2_{22}	0_{22}	2_{24}	3_{27}	3_{30}	0_{30}	2_{32}	3_{35}	1_{36}	2_{38}	6_{44}	3_{47}	47
7	Ben King	3_{3}	3_{6}	4_{10}	1_{11}	2_{13}	5_{18}	2_{20}	3_{23}	2_{25}	3_{28}	4_{32}	0_{32}	0_{32}	2_{34}	0_{34}	4_{38}	0_{38}	2_{40}	3_{43}	0_{43}	0_{43}	0_{43}	4_{47}	47
10	Charlie Dixon	2_{2}	4_{6}	0_{6}	0_{6}	2_{8}	2_{10}	0_{10}	2_{12}	2_{14}	1_{15}	3_{18}	0_{18}	4_{22}	2_{24}	2_{26}	4_{30}	2_{32}	1_{33}	4_{37}	4_{41}	1_{42}	4_{46}	0_{46}	46

=== Player milestones ===
Player milestones
Name	Club	Milestone	Round
Brad Sheppard	West Coast	200 AFL games	Round 4
Luke Dahlhaus	Geelong	200 AFL games	Round 6
Nathan Jones	Melbourne	300 AFL games	Round 6
Dustin Martin	Richmond	250 AFL games	Round 6
Brandon Ellis	Gold Coast	200 AFL games	Round 8
Steele Sidebottom	Collingwood	250 AFL games	Round 8
Robbie Gray	Port Adelaide	250 AFL games	Round 14
Shaun Burgoyne	Hawthorn	400 AFL games	Round 16
Steven Motlop	Port Adelaide	200 AFL games	Round 17
Nathan Fyfe	Fremantle	200 AFL games	Round 17
Lachie Henderson	Geelong	200 AFL games	Round 17
Dayne Zorko	Brisbane Lions	200 AFL games	Round 17
Jack Riewoldt	Richmond	700 AFL goals	Round 17
Todd Goldstein	North Melbourne	Most hitouts in VFL/AFL history	Round 17
Jack Riewoldt	Richmond	300 AFL games	Round 18
Brodie Smith	Adelaide	200 AFL games	Round 18
Nic Naitanui	West Coast	200 AFL games	Round 18
Lance Franklin	Sydney	400 Sydney goals	Round 18
Travis Boak	Port Adelaide	300 AFL games	Round 19
Ed Curnow	Carlton	200 AFL games	Round 19
David Mundy	Fremantle	350 AFL games	Round 19
Shaun Higgins	Geelong	250 AFL games	Round 20
Shannon Hurn	West Coast	300 AFL games	Round 20
Cameron Guthrie	Geelong	200 AFL games	Round 21
Marc Murphy	Carlton	300 AFL games	Round 22
Mark Blicavs	Geelong	200 AFL games	Round 23
Eddie Betts	Carlton	350 AFL games	Round 23
Jordan Roughead	Collingwood	200 AFL games	Round 23
Tom Hawkins	Geelong	300 AFL games	Qualifying Final
Jackson Macrae	Western Bulldogs	Most disposals in a VFL/AFL season	Preliminary Final

=== Best and fairest ===
Club	Award name	Player	Times won
Adelaide	Malcolm Blight Medal	Rory Laird	2
Brisbane Lions	Merrett–Murray Medal	Dayne Zorko	5
Carlton	John Nicholls Medal	Sam Walsh	1
Collingwood	Copeland Trophy	Jack Crisp	1
Essendon	W. S. Crichton Medal	Zach Merrett	3
Fremantle	Doig Medal	Sean Darcy	1
Geelong	Carji Greeves Medal	Tom Stewart	1
Gold Coast	Club Champion	Touk Miller	1
Greater Western Sydney	Kevin Sheedy Medal	Josh Kelly	2
Hawthorn	Peter Crimmins Medal	Tom Mitchell	3
Melbourne	Keith 'Bluey' Truscott Trophy	Clayton Oliver	3
North Melbourne	Syd Barker Medal	Jy Simpkin	1
Port Adelaide	John Cahill Medal	Ollie Wines	1
Richmond	Jack Dyer Medal	Dylan Grimes	1
St Kilda	Trevor Barker Award	Jack Steele	2
Sydney	Bob Skilton Medal	Luke Parker	3
West Coast	John Worsfold Medal	Nic Naitanui	2
Western Bulldogs	Charles Sutton Medal	Marcus Bontempelli	4

== Coach changes ==
Outgoing coach	Club	Date	Notes	Caretaker coach	Incoming coach
Nathan Buckley	Collingwood	9 June 2021	Stepped down after round 13 following poor start to the season in his final year of contract.	Robert Harvey	Craig McRae
Alastair Clarkson	Hawthorn	30 July 2021	Stepping down at the end of the season after succession plan ended earlier than expected.	N/A	Sam Mitchell
David Teague	Carlton	26 August 2021	Sacked following an extensive review of the club's football operations.	N/A (end of season)	Michael Voss
