= Marcus Bontempelli =

Australian rules footballer (born 1995)

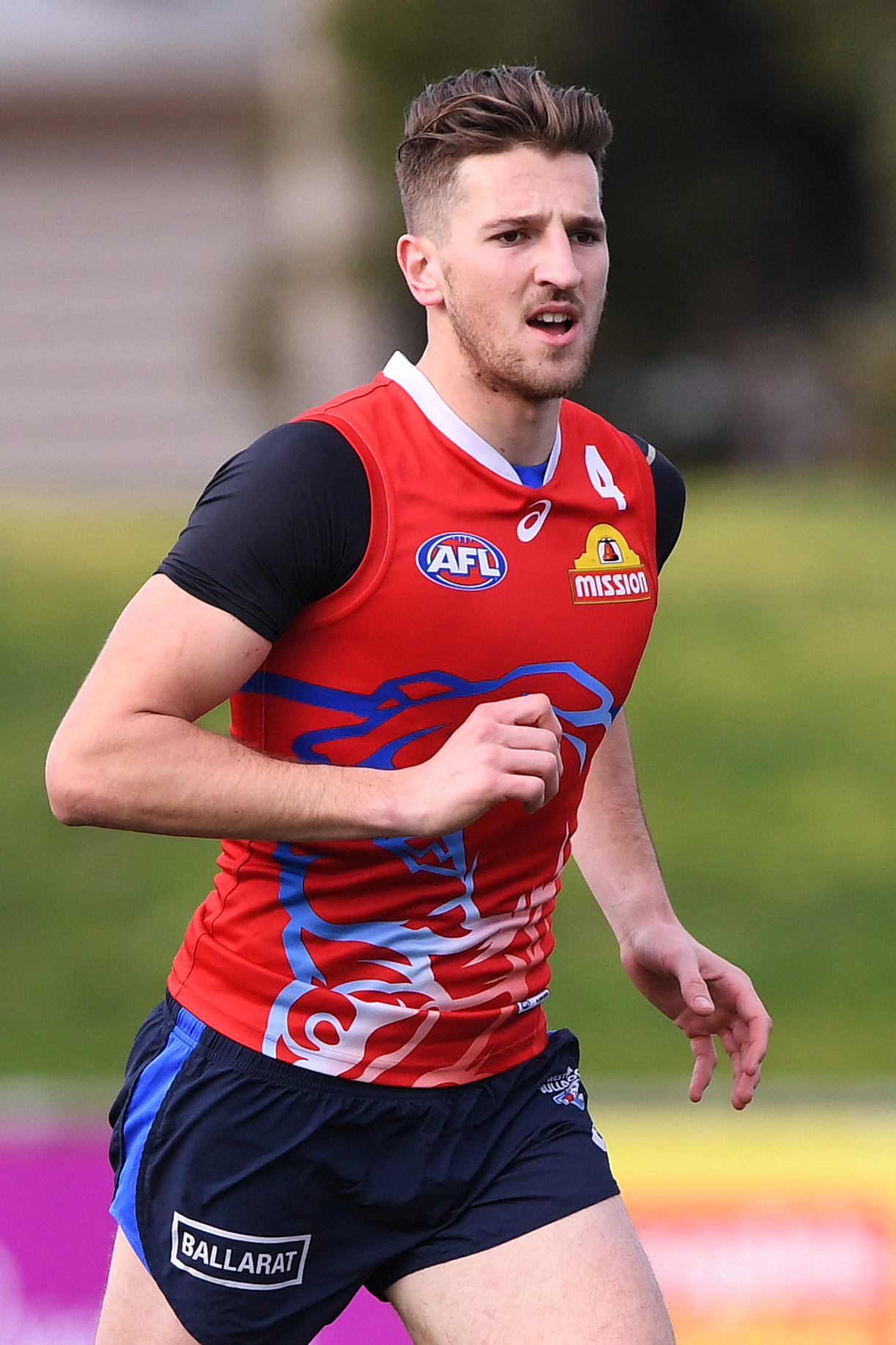
- Bontempelli training at Whitten Oval in 2018

Personal information
- Full name: Marcus Bontempelli
- Nicknames: Bont, The Bont
- Born: 24 November 1995 (age 30); Melbourne, Australia
- Original team: Northern Knights (TAC Cup)/Eltham Football Club
- Draft: No. 4, 2013 national draft
- Debut: Round 5, 2014, Western Bulldogs vs. Carlton, at Docklands Stadium
- Height: 194 cm (6 ft 4 in)
- Weight: 96 kg (212 lb)
- Position: Midfielder

Club information
- Current club: Western Bulldogs
- Number: 4

Playing career^{1}
Years	Club	Games (Goals)
2014–	Western Bulldogs	282 (284)

Representative team honours^{2}
Years	Team	Games (Goals)
2020–2026	Victoria	2 (3)
- ^{1} Playing statistics correct to the end of 2026.^{2} Representative statistics correct as of 2026.

Career highlights
- AFL premiership player: 2016; Western Bulldogs captain: 2020–; 3× Leigh Matthews Trophy: 2021, 2023, 2024; AFLCA Champion Player of the Year Award: 2019; 3× AFLPA Best Captain Award: 2021, 2023, 2024; 8× All-Australian team: 2016, 2019, 2020, 2021 (vc), 2023 (vc), 2024 (c), 2025, 2026; 7× Charles Sutton Medal: 2016, 2017, 2019, 2021, 2023, 2024, 2026; Herald Sun Player of the Year: 2019; AFLPA Best First-Year Player: 2014; AFLCA Best Young Player of the Year: 2015; 5× 22under22 team: 2014, 2015, 2016 (c), 2017 (c), 2018 (c); AFL Rising Star nominee: 2014; Victoria State of Origin Captain: 2026

Marcus Bontempelli (born 24 November 1995) is a professional Australian rules footballer playing for the Western Bulldogs in the Australian Football League (AFL). He has served as Western Bulldogs captain since the 2020 season, and was previously the vice-captain from 2018 to 2019.

Bontempelli was drafted with the fourth selection in the 2013 AFL draft. He made his AFL debut in the 2014 AFL season. He received a nomination for the 2014 AFL Rising Star award in round 13 of the 2014 season, placing second in the overall count at the conclusion of the season. Since then, he has been an AFL Premiership player, eight-time All-Australian, seven-time Charles Sutton Medal, three-time AFLPA Most Valuable Player and a recipient of the AFLCA Champion Player of the Year Award. He was runner-up in the 2021 and 2023 Brownlow Medals. Bontempelli began playing junior football for Eltham football Club in Melbourne, Victoria. He played for the Northern Knights in the TAC Cup, a prestigious under-18 competition in Victoria. Bontempelli impressed scouts with his skills, athleticism, and leadership on the field, earning him a spot on the Western Bulldogs.

== Early life ==
Bontempelli was raised in Eltham in the north eastern suburbs of Melbourne, Victoria. He was the third of four children to father, Carlo, and mother, Geraldine. He was educated at Marcellin College, and played junior football for the Eltham Panthers in the Northern Football Netball League junior divisions. Bontempelli was the sports captain at Marcellin College in his final year, and he played for both the 1st XVIII football team and the 1st basketball team. He notably had a game where he collected 50 disposals and kicked 10 goals. Bontempelli had a successful time playing basketball before turning to Australian rules football, playing in two winning school basketball premierships and becoming a National School Boys basketball champion.

Bontempelli played for the Northern Knights in the TAC Cup for the 2013 season. After originally playing as a floating half back and forward, Bontempelli moved into the midfield during his time with the Knights. He participated in 19 games and kicked 138 goals throughout the season, while also being selected in the 2013 TAC Cup Team on the interchange bench. He also played for Vic Metro in the AFL Under 18 Championships in 2013, primarily in the half back and wing positions. While playing for Vic Metro, he had a disposal efficiency of 79 percent.

Initially, it was not clear where Bontempelli was likely to be selected in the 2013 AFL draft. Some sources had Bontempelli ranging from pick four to even as far down as pick 15. There were talks of Essendon trying to obtain Bontempelli after it was stated they were prepared to send their eleventh selection and forward Stewart Crameri in exchange for pick four. However, this did not eventuate. Bontempelli ended up getting selected with the fourth selection in the draft, behind Tom Boyd, Josh Kelly, and Jack Billings.

== AFL career ==
=== 2014 ===
Bontempelli made his senior debut in the Western Bulldogs's 38 point loss to Carlton in round 5 of the 2014 AFL season. On debut, Bontempelli collected 14 disposals and 5 tackles, beginning to build his reputation as a high pressure player. He received an AFL Rising Star nomination in round 13 for his 22 disposals and one goal performance in the Bulldogs' win over Collingwood. In round 15, Bontempelli kicked a remarkable goal tight up on the boundary in the final minutes of the match to give the Dogs a one-goal win over Melbourne. Bontempelli was awarded the Chris Grant best first-year player in 2014, alongside the AFL Players Association best first-year player award. He finished second in the AFL Rising Star in the same year, losing to Brisbane Lions player Lewis Taylor by a single vote. His outstanding performance in his debut year meant that he was also selected in the 22 Under 22 team, alongside teammate Tom Liberatore. Bontempelli polled 4 votes at the 2014 Brownlow Medal count that year, including three in his standout performance against Melbourne in round 15.

=== 2015 ===
Bontempelli continued to improve over the course of the 2015 season, playing all games except for round three and round ten, when he was injured with an adductor strain. In 2015 he picked up a career-high 28 disposals while playing Gold Coast, also kicking 2 goals, taking 7 marks and collecting 7 tackles. Bontempelli collected 24 disposals, 3 marks, 2 behinds and 7 tackles in the Western Bulldogs' seven point elimination final loss to Adelaide. He was named as one of their best on ground. Bontempelli came third in the Charles Sutton Medal, the award for the Best and fairest player for the Western Bulldogs. He was only topped by Easton Wood and Bob Murphy in the count. On top of this, he more than tripled his Brownlow Medal votes from last season, leading the club for total Brownlow votes that season after picking up thirteen votes at just the age of 19. Six of those votes were in the first two rounds after back-to-back best on ground performances, while he collected two other best on ground performances in round 15 and round 22. He was once again named in the 22 Under 22 team as a midfielder. He signed a long-term contract with the Bulldogs in September, keeping him at the club until 2019.

=== 2016–2017: Premiership success ===
==== 2016 ====
Bontempelli had his best year yet in 2016, playing every single game of the season, including the Western Bulldogs fairytale premiership win. Bontempelli was elevated into the club's leadership group at the beginning of the year. Bontempelli collected a career-high 33 disposals in the Bulldogs' round 8 match against Melbourne. During the 2015 and 2016 period, he was often used during ruck contests, getting at least one hitout in 40 out of his 47 games during this period. On 5 June 2016, in the absence of acting captain Easton Wood, who was filling in for injured regular captain Bob Murphy, Bontempelli captained the Western Bulldogs against West Coast at Etihad Stadium, becoming the youngest match day captain in the AFL since Jack Trengove in 2012. With the Bulldogs winning the match by eight points, Bontempelli became the youngest player in history to captain a VFL/AFL side to victory at 20 years and 194 days of age. He was instrumental in the Bulldogs' four consecutive finals, including the 2016 AFL Grand Final, which was the club's first premiership victory in 62 years. His season was rewarded with the Charles Sutton Medal, finishing 71 votes clear of second-placed Dale Morris. He also won the John Schultz Community Award. He received 20 votes in the 2016 Brownlow Medal, the highest of any player for the Bulldogs in 2016, and his highest total to that date. He had five games in which he was voted best on ground, and finished 8th overall in the voting. Bontempelli made the 22 under 22 team for the third year in a row, named the captain of the team. He also made the All-Australian team for the first time, named on the interchange bench, alongside veteran teammate Matthew Boyd.

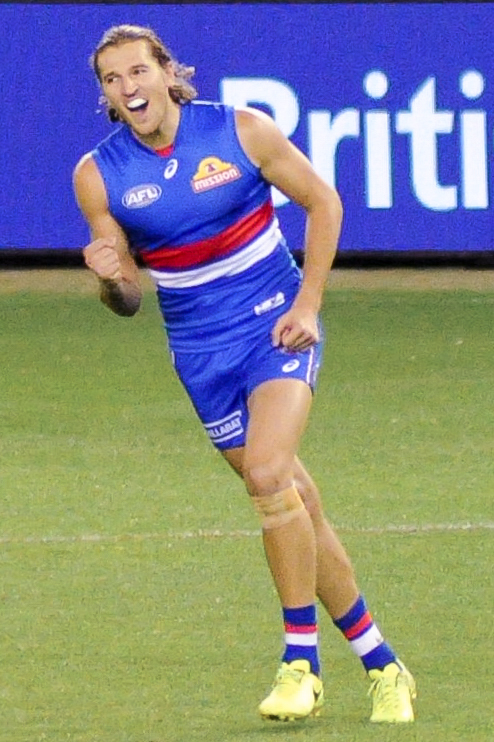
Marcus Bontempelli celebrating a goal against Sydney on 31 March 2017

He's an extraordinary talent, this bloke. I'm not sure how good a player he can be in the history of that club, but he could well end up being the best player the club's ever had — even greater than the great EJ Whitten.

— Gerard Healy

==== 2017 ====
Bontempelli missed the 2017 JLT Community Series after a minor ankle injury at the club's pre-season camp in January. He had season-best games against Carlton in round 2 and Sydney in round 17, kicking 2 goals and collecting 30 disposals in each game. He led the team in total number of behinds, tackles, inside 50s, clearances, contested marks and contested possessions by the end of the season. Former Melbourne and Sydney great Gerald Healy described Bontempelli as someone who 'could end his career as the greatest player in the history of the Western Bulldogs', after his 23 disposal, 2 goal performance against Brisbane Lions in round 20. After another great season for the Bulldogs, Bontempelli claimed his second Charles Sutton Medal, and was once again named as captain of the 22 under 22 team, his fourth consecutive year being named in the team and second consecutive year as captain. On 20 November 2017, Bontempelli was named vice-captain of the club for the 2018 AFL season, following Murphy's retirement and Wood's elevation to captain from vice-captain. Bontempelli had a similar vote count to his previous year in the 2017 Brownlow Medal, with a total of 19 votes, including 6 best on ground games in rounds 2, 6, 7, 14, 17 and 20. He finished in 7th.

=== 2018–2019: Vice-captaincy ===
==== 2018 ====
Bontempelli played all but one game in the 2018 AFL season, in a disappointing season for the Bulldogs where they missed finals for the second year in a row. On 10 July 2018, Bontempelli was taken to hospital with severe appendicitis and had surgery to resolve the issue. Bontempelli was then placed on the sidelines in order to allow him to recover from the surgery, and subsequently missed round 7. This meant he missed what was due to be his 100th game. However, he ended up playing his 100th AFL game in the Western Bulldogs's 44 point loss to Port Adelaide in round 19, where he collected 22 disposals. Bontempelli broke his career high record for disposals twice in two consecutive matches in rounds 21 and 22, against Carlton and North Melbourne respectively. Bontempelli came 3rd in the Charles Sutton Medal count, behind Lachie Hunter and Jack Macrae. For the fifth consecutive year, Bontempelli was named in the 22 under 22 team, setting the record as the first player to be named in the 22 under 22 team for 5 consecutive years. He only polled 9 votes in the 2018 Brownlow Medal, his lowest count since his debut year. Bontempelli signed a three-year contract extension with the Bulldogs in November, after which he stated "I've made no secret about the love I have for the Club, and how I want to play a key role in the future success of this playing group,". After questions as to why he only signed a shorter deal than expected, Bontempelli said "There's a bit of intrinsic value for me to continue to stay accountable to what I want to achieve. As an individual player I think I've got a lot of growth ahead of me and it keeps me invested from day to day."

==== 2019 ====
Bontempelli had another successful year in 2019, taking the Bulldogs to the finals series as the team's vice-captain. Bontempelli had 5 games where he collected 30 or more disposals. His 27 disposal, 3 goal performance in round 7 against the future premiers, Richmond, was one of his best for the season. A high bump from Bontempelli on Greater Western Sydney defender Nick Haynes in the penultimate round of the season resulted in Haynes getting a fractured larynx and Bontempelli narrowly missing suspension. Bontempelli was heavily tagged in the Bulldogs' elimination final loss to Greater Western Sydney, resulting in a loss for the Bulldogs, adding to the growing rivalry of the two clubs. Bontempelli made the All-Australian squad for the second time in his career. He was named on the wing, as there was fierce competition for the highly contested midfield spots. Bontempelli also won the AFL Coaches Association Player of the Year award, winning with a total of 107 votes, 17 votes ahead of second placed Patrick Dangerfield. He was the first Western Bulldogs player to win the award since it was first introduced in 2003, with 312 game Bulldog player Bob Murphy describing him as a "generational player". Bontempelli won the Charles Sutton Medal for the 3rd time, gathering 299 votes, giving him a margin of 29 votes against the second placed Josh Dunkley.

He may go down as their greatest ever player at the Western Bulldogs. I think his record and what he will do at the Western Bulldogs — I think he will captain the club and I think he will win a Brownlow — so give him another seven or eight years and we may be saying he was the greatest Dog there's ever been.

— Matthew Lloyd

In December 2019, Easton Wood stood down as Western Bulldogs captain, and Bontempelli was announced as the new captain from 2020. Bontempelli tied with fellow Bulldog Jack Macrae to collect 22 votes in the 2019 Brownlow Medal, judged best on field in 5 games—rounds 1, 3, 15, 19 and 20.

=== 2020–present: Captaincy ===
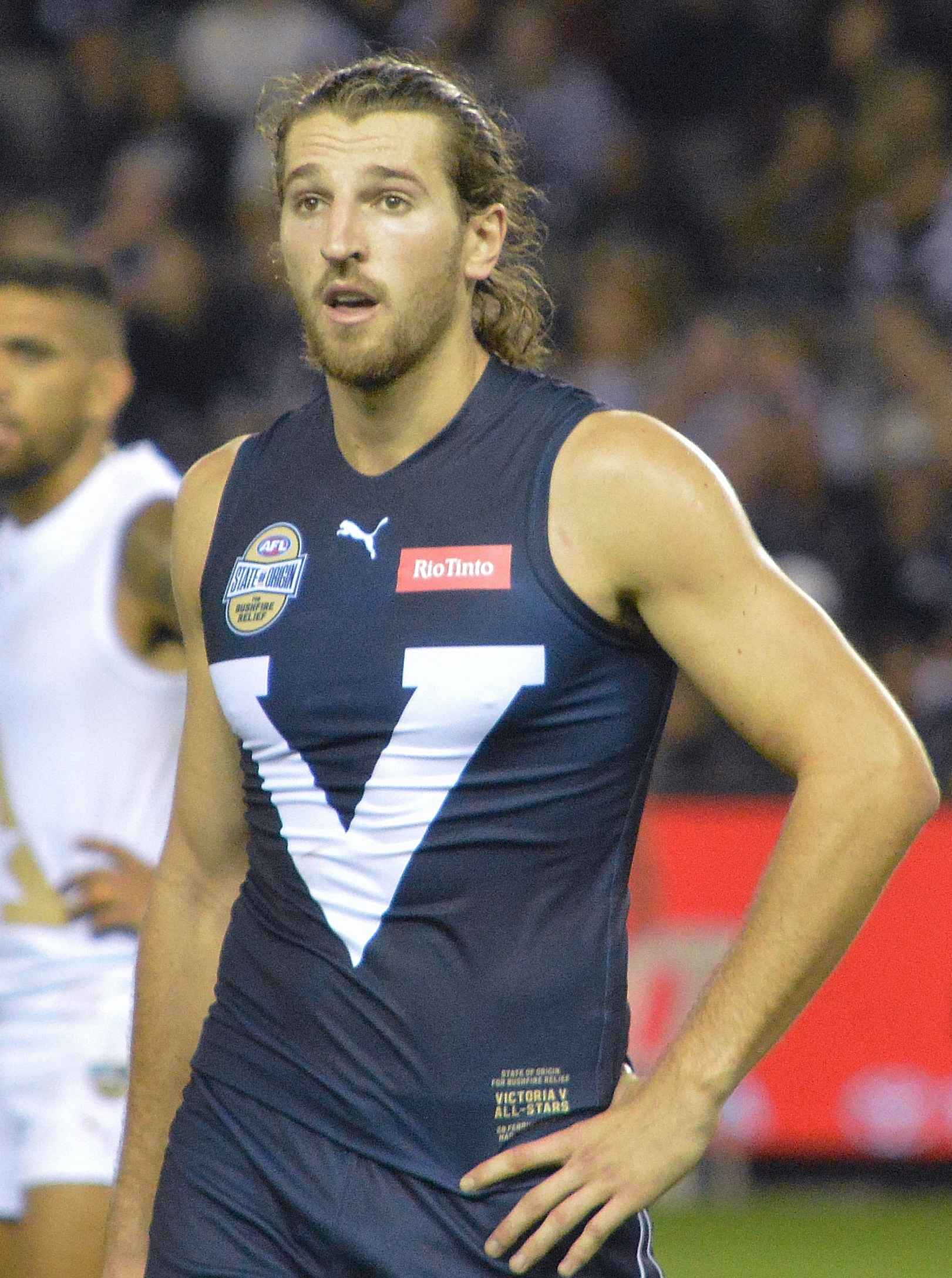
Marcus Bontempelli playing for Victoria in the 2020 Bushfire Relief Match.

==== 2020 ====
Prior to the 2020 home-and-away season, he was selected to represent Victoria in the State of Origin for Bushfire Relief Match, played in February 2020. He played with teammate Jack Macrae and against fellow Bulldog Jason Johannisen. In the match, he kicked 2 goals. In the main 2020 AFL season, Bontempelli had a stand-out game against Adelaide in round 12, where he had 33 disposals, 2 goals and 12 clearances.

Bontempelli was again recognised for his impressive performance throughout the season, and was named in the All-Australian team for the third time in his career, and the second year in a row, this time as a forward. His selection on the forward line caused backlash as Bontempelli, primarily a midfielder, took the spot of forward that "could have gone to players that primarily play in the forward line". Bontempelli captained the Bulldogs to the 2020 finals series in a relatively fruitful year, playing every single game.

Bontempelli came runner-up in the Charles Sutton Medal voting, losing to defender Caleb Daniel by a mere 10 votes. He also won the club's Scott West Most Courageous Player Award. Bontempelli polled 10 brownlow votes in the 2020 Brownlow Medal count, placing him at 22nd overall in the count.

==== 2021 ====
After a mediocre opening round to the 2021 AFL season, Bontempelli lifted his performance dramatically and had a best-on-ground performance the following week, kicking the winning goal to seal the win against West Coast. Bontempelli played his 150th AFL career game in round 5, where the Western Bulldogs strongly defeated Gold Coast. He was named as the game's best on ground by most media sources, after his 33 disposals and 3 goals helped the Bulldogs win their fifth game in a row, seeing the Bulldogs go undefeated for 5 rounds for the first time since 1946. Bontempelli again led his team to victory in round 8 of the season, where his 32 disposals, 10 clearances, 8 tackles and 1 goal saw him heralded as the team's best on ground for the game. Bontempelli equalled his highest goal tally for a game after kicking 4 goals in the team's 111-point victory over St Kilda in round 10, again being named as best on ground. It was announced that Bontempelli had signed a four-year contract with the Bulldogs on 25 May 2021, where he stated that it was "an exciting time" for the Bulldogs and himself as a part of the team. By the end of Round 10, Bontempelli was tipped to be the favourite for the 2021 Brownlow Medal, leading AFL.com.au's Brownlow predictor with 17 votes. He ultimately finished runner-up with 33 votes to Port Adelaide's Ollie Wines. Bontempelli won the Charles Sutton Medal for the fourth time.

==== 2022 ====
Dealing with injury and fluctuating team performance, Bontempelli had a more grounded year, missing selection in the All-Australian team for the first season since 2018. A switch into the forward line in round 5 saw Bontempelli obtain his first Brownlow vote for the year after kicking 2 of the first 3 goals of the game, with 3 goals and 18 disposals overall ensuring the Bulldogs defeated North Melbourne. Another setback occurred for Bontempelli in round 8, rested after a bad bout of flu saw him sidelined. Bontempelli was credited with an "inspiring performance" to carry the Bulldogs to victory against Gold Coast in a tight game in Ballarat's round 10 match, where he kicked 3 goals, 2 of those occurring in the last quarter. After the team's 17-point loss to Fremantle in round 21, Bontempelli suffered an adductor injury; however, the presence and extent of the injury was not fully understood by the football media and public until after Bontempelli's important performance in the penultimate round of the season, where it was revealed by coach Luke Beveridge that despite some "niggles", he would be "raring to go" for the team's elimination final against Fremantle. Bontempelli finished fourth in the season for the Charles Sutton Medal, trailing leader Josh Dunkley by 57 votes.

==== 2023 ====
Bontempelli had an outstanding 2023 season, winning his fifth Charles Sutton Medal, placing second for the second time in the 2023 Brownlow Medal count (behind Lachie Neale), placing second for the AFL Coaches Association's AFL Champion Player Award (behind Zak Butters), and called the best player of the year by sports journalist Mark Robinson.

==== 2024 ====
Bontempelli played every game of the 2024 on the way to his third Leigh Matthews Trophy, sixth All-Australian team and sixth Charles Sutton Medal. He was also named as the All-Australian Captain for the first time. After controversially finishing second in the Brownlow Medal the previous season, there was again controversy as he only polled 19 votes to finish 13th. With decisions such as not awarding any votes for his Round 2 performance against Gold Coast, where he had polled all 10 AFL Coaches Association points, coming under scrutiny, amid renewed calls for umpires to be allowed access to statistics before they vote. He eventually led the Dogs to the Finals, where they lost to Hawthorn in the Elimination Final.

==== 2025 ====
Bontempelli suffered a complex calf injury in the opening minutes of a preseason practice match, and missed the first five rounds of the 2025 AFL season. He returned in round 6 to play a pivotal role in the Bulldogs' win over St Kilda, kicking two goals from 30 disposals.

In 2026, Bontempelli won his seventh record-equalling Charles Sutton Medal.

== Personal life ==
Bontempelli's older sister, Olivia, plays basketball. In 2023, she won a Big V championship and earned Finals MVP honours playing for the Bulleen Boomers.

He has Italian and Irish heritage.

Bontempelli is the younger cousin of former St Kilda and North Melbourne player Nick Dal Santo. He supported Richmond in his youth, and cited Matthew Richardson as his all-time favourite player.

Known for his passionate activism on many social issues, Bontempelli was one of three AFL players who came together in 2015 to help advocate against violence towards women, alongside Shaun Burgoyne and Patrick Dangerfield. This was part of the Through the Line campaign. He also featured in a campaign by the Western Bulldogs in 2017 to advocate for marriage equality, where he stated "Marriage equality won't make a difference to the vast majority of Australians but it will make a profound difference to the status and dignity of many". He has volunteered for a charity called Ladder, which aims to improve life for young people in Australia by working with AFL players to mentor young people.

Chris Hemsworth starred as Bontempelli in an AFL advertising campaign that ran in the early months of 2017, in order to promote the game to international audiences. Bontempelli co-authored a children's picture book with Fiona Harris, after Affirm Press acquired the rights to the book in September 2020. The book was released on 26 October 2021. He also appeared in a set of advertisements by AAMI insurance throughout 2021.

In November 2024, Bontempelli proposed to partner Neila Brenning in Italy. They married in California in October 2025.

Bontempelli and Brenning own a cafe in Kew called Arthur's Milkbar.

== Statistics ==
Updated to the end of round 22, 2026.

Legend
G	Goals	K	Kicks	D	Disposals	T	Tackles
B	Behinds	H	Handballs	M	Marks
#	Played in that season's premiership team

Season	Team	No.	Games	Totals							Averages (per game)							Votes
Season	Team	No.	Games	G	B	K	H	D	M	T	G	B	K	H	D	M	T	Votes
2014	Western Bulldogs	4	16	15	10	133	121	254	47	55	0.9	0.6	8.3	7.6	15.9	2.9	3.4	4
2015	Western Bulldogs	4	21	17	10	261	183	444	69	116	0.8	0.5	12.4	8.7	21.1	3.3	5.5	13
2016^{#}	Western Bulldogs	4	26	26	17	301	332	633	99	123	1.0	0.7	11.6	12.8	24.3	3.8	4.7	20
2017	Western Bulldogs	4	22	20	29	285	220	505	88	138	0.9	1.3	13.0	10.0	23.0	4.0	6.3	19
2018	Western Bulldogs	4	19	22	16	258	199	457	63	71	1.2	0.8	13.6	10.5	24.1	3.3	3.7	9
2019	Western Bulldogs	4	23	15	27	347	259	606	94	116	0.7	1.2	15.1	11.3	26.3	4.1	5.0	22
2020 (Note: The 2020 season was played with 17 home-and-away matches per team (down from 22) and 16-minute quarters with time on (down from 20-minute quarters with time on) due to the impact of the COVID-19 pandemic.)	Western Bulldogs	4	18	11	7	211	164	375	59	89	0.6	0.4	11.7	9.1	20.8	3.3	4.9	10
2021	Western Bulldogs	4	26	31	19	396	299	695	104	127	1.2	0.7	15.2	11.5	26.7	4.0	4.9	33
2022	Western Bulldogs	4	22	24	21	287	230	517	116	115	1.1	1.0	13.0	10.5	23.5	5.3	5.2	10
2023	Western Bulldogs	4	23	19	14	370	266	636	101	172	0.8	0.6	16.1	11.6	27.7	4.4	7.5	29
2024	Western Bulldogs	4	24	32	20	324	294	618	96	130	1.3	0.8	13.5	12.3	25.8	4.0	5.4	19
2025	Western Bulldogs	4	18	21	17	254	233	487	84	98	1.2	0.9	14.1	12.9	27.1	4.7	5.4	25
2026	Western Bulldogs	4	24	31	14	326	312	638	99	97	1.3	0.6	13.6	13.0	26.6	4.1	4.0	34
Career			282	284	221	3753	3112	6865	1119	1447	1.0	0.8	13.3	11.0	24.3	4.0	5.1	247

== Honours and achievements ==
Team

- AFL premiership player (Western Bulldogs): 2016

Individual

- Western Bulldogs captain: 2020–present
- 3x Leigh Matthews Trophy: 2021, 2023, 2024
- AFLCA Champion Player of the Year Award: 2019
- AFLPA Best Captain Award : 2021, 2023, 2024
- 8× All-Australian team: 2016, 2019, 2020, 2021(vc), 2023(vc), 2024(c), 2025, 2026
- 7× Charles Sutton Medal: 2016, 2017, 2019, 2021, 2023, 2024
- Herald Sun Player of the Year: 2019
- AFLPA best first year player: 2014
- AFLCA best young player of the year: 2015
- 5× 22under22 team: 2014, 2015, 2016 (c), 2017 (c), 2018 (c)
- AFL Rising Star nominee: 2014
- Victoria representative honours in State of Origin for Bushfire Relief Match
- Victoria State of Origin Captain: 2026
