= 2021 Brownlow Medal =

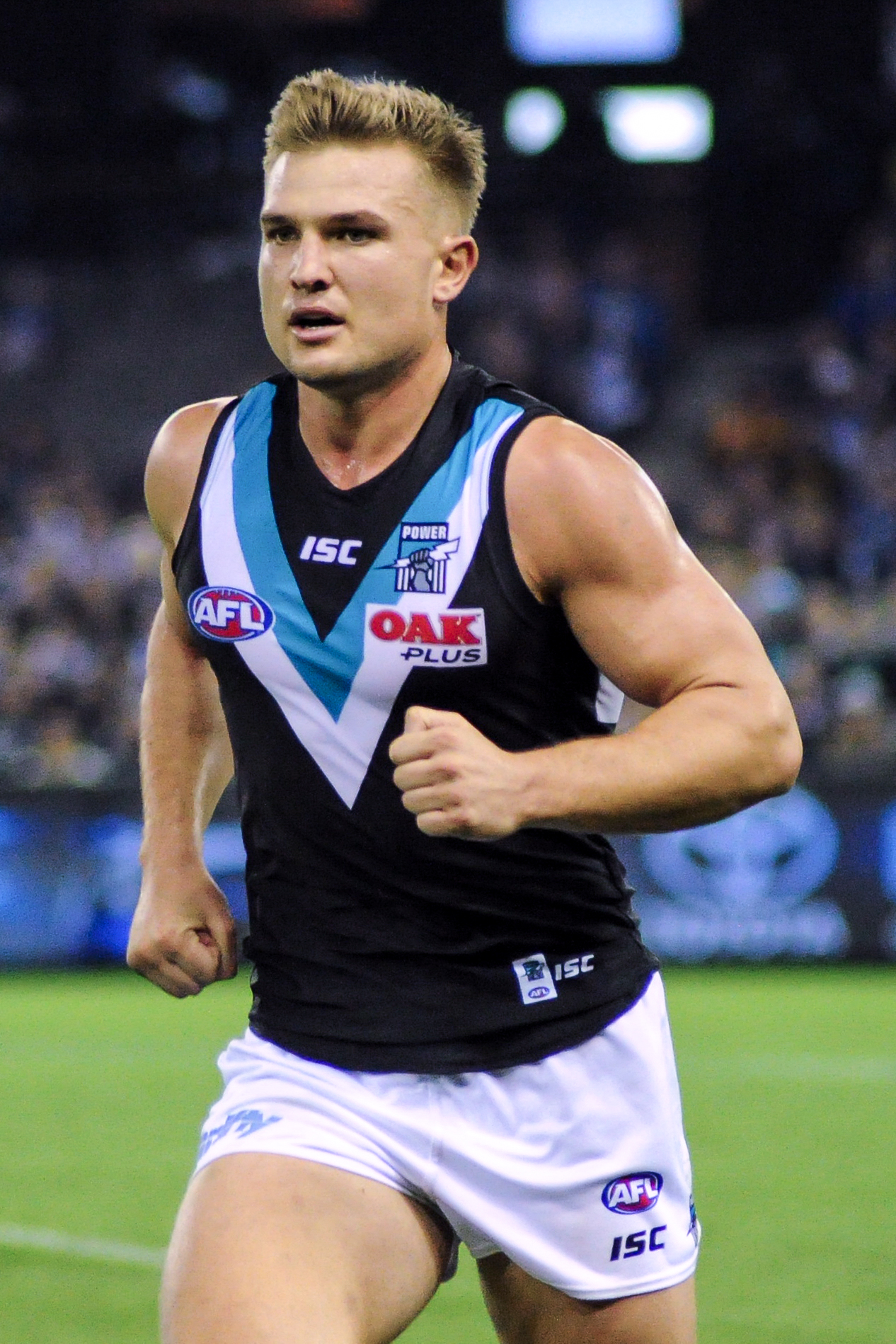
- 2021 Brownlow Medallist, Ollie Wines
- Date: Sunday, 19 September 2021
- Location: Optus Stadium, Various venues
- Hosted by: Hamish McLachlan, Jacqueline Felgate (from Melbourne); Basil Zempilas (from Perth)
- Winner: Ollie Wines (Port Adelaide) (36 votes)

Television/radio coverage
- Network: Seven Network; Telstra

The 2021 Brownlow Medal was the 94th year the award was presented to the player adjudged the best and fairest player during the Australian Football League (AFL) home-and-away season. For the second year in a row, due to the travel restrictions imposed as a result of the COVID-19 pandemic in Australia, the ceremony was not held in Melbourne but instead a mainly made-for-television event, with players attending their nearest function in four different states. With Perth hosting the 2021 AFL Grand Final, the main function was held at Optus Stadium on Sunday, 19 September 2021.

Ollie Wines of the Port Adelaide Football Club won the medal with 36 votes, equalling the record set by Dustin Martin in 2017 Brownlow Medal for most votes in a season under the 3–2–1 voting system, until it was broken by Patrick Cripps in 2024.

== Reactions ==
Reaction to the 2021 count saw discussion about the trend of vote inflation, as Wines equalled Dustin Martin's 2017 record of 36 votes and the top four vote-getters each polling at least 30 votes, which would have been enough to win the overwhelming majority of Brownlows in the past.

In round 21 against Geelong, it was regarded that Sam Taylor of Greater Western Sydney played an excellent defensive game on Tom Hawkins that according to former player Garry Lyon "was as good a defensive game as we’ve ever seen against one of the great forwards in recent history", yet received no votes from the umpires.

== Leading vote-getters ==
	Player	Votes
1st	Ollie Wines (Port Adelaide)	36
2nd	Marcus Bontempelli (Western Bulldogs)	33
3rd	Clayton Oliver (Melbourne)	31
4th	Sam Walsh (Carlton)	30
=5th	Darcy Parish (Essendon)	26
=5th	Jack Steele (St Kilda)	26
=7th	Tom Mitchell (Hawthorn)	25
=7th	Travis Boak (Port Adelaide)	25
=9th	Jarryd Lyons (Brisbane Lions)	23
=9th	Christian Petracca (Melbourne)	23

== Voting procedure ==
The three field umpires (those umpires who control the flow of the game, as opposed to goal or boundary umpires) confer after each match and award three votes, two votes, and one vote to the players they regard as the best, second-best and third-best in the match, respectively. The votes are kept secret until the awards night, and they are read and tallied on the evening.
