= Ollie Wines =

Australian rules footballer

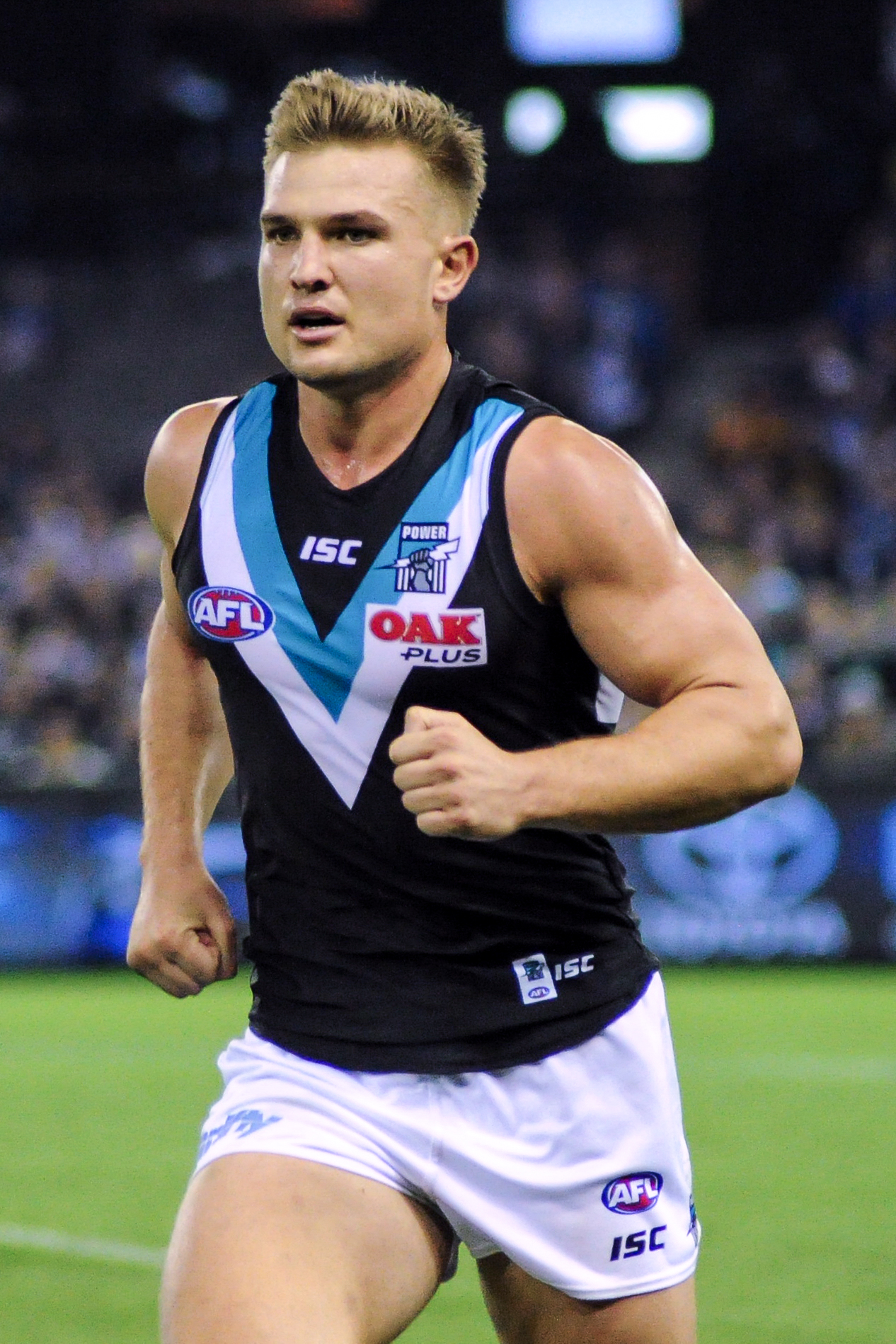
- Wines playing for Port Adelaide in 2018

Personal information
- Full name: Oliver Wines
- Born: 7 October 1994 (age 32); Echuca, Victoria
- Original team: Bendigo Pioneers (TAC Cup)
- Draft: No. 7, 2012 national draft
- Debut: Round 1, 2013, Port Adelaide vs. Melbourne, at the Melbourne Cricket Ground
- Height: 187 cm (6 ft 2 in)
- Weight: 99 kg (218 lb)
- Position: Midfielder

Club information
- Current club: Port Adelaide
- Number: 16

Playing career^{1}
Years	Club	Games (Goals)
2013–	Port Adelaide	292 (106)
- ^{1} Playing statistics correct to the end of 2026.

Career highlights
- Port Adelaide co-captain: 2019; Brownlow Medal: 2021; All-Australian team: 2021; John Cahill Medal: 2021; Peter Badcoe VC Medal: 2021; AFL Rising Star nominee: 2013

Oliver Wines (born 7 October 1994) is a professional Australian rules footballer playing for the Port Adelaide Football Club in the Australian Football League (AFL). Wines served as Port Adelaide co-captain in the 2019 season. In 2021, he won a Brownlow Medal, polling a then record-equalling 36 votes, and won selection in the 2021 All-Australian team and the John Cahill Medal.

== Early life ==
Wines played his junior football at the Echuca Football Club and for the Bendigo Pioneers in the TAC Cup before being drafted by Port Adelaide in the 2012 AFL draft. Wines attended Goulburn Valley Grammar School, in Shepparton. Wines' great uncle was Clinton Wines, who played 39 games for Carlton during the 1940s, including the 1945 VFL premiership. As a boy, Wines would often call into Rex Hunt's talk back radio show on 3AW where he would ask questions about Andrew Walker's statistics.

== AFL career ==
Prior to the 2012 AFL draft, Wines was predicted to go to the Melbourne Football Club along with Jack Viney, his best friend who attended the same primary school at Echuca and was already a father–son selection pick with Melbourne. Instead, he was overlooked by Melbourne and was drafted by Port Adelaide with their first selection, pick seven, in the 2012 national draft. He made his AFL debut in the opening round of the 2013 AFL season at the Melbourne Cricket Ground against Melbourne, which also featured his best friend, Jack Viney. Port Adelaide won the game by 79 points. In an impressive debut, Wines finished the game with 24 disposals including 16 contested possessions and one goal, earning him the Round 1 nomination for the 2013 AFL Rising Star. He ended up finishing third in the Rising Star with 26 votes.

Wines had a strong season in 2014 with thoughts that he may have been subject to the second year blues dispelled in Round 1 as he achieved career bests in many categories in Round 1 against Carlton—twenty-eight disposals, two goals, and nine tackles. He played in every game for the club primarily as an inside midfielder. In the finals, he averaged twenty-three disposals and kicked five goals across three games. At season's end, he placed equal sixth in the club's best and fairest and won his second consecutive Gavin Wanganeen medal as Port's best player under 21.

After a stunning first two seasons, Wines' 2015 season was interrupted. He started the season strongly, averaging 28 disposals and a goal across the first two games before injuring his wrist in Round 2 against North Melbourne, sidelining him for a month. Wines returned to the side and quickly picked up where he had left off as Port's big-bodied inside midfield having a best on ground performance against the Western Bulldogs in Round 10 and Collingwood in Round 15. He received the three Brownlow Medal votes in both those games. Unfortunately for Wines, his season came to a premature end in Round 18 when he dislocated his shoulder early against St Kilda, requiring a full reconstruction.

In February 2019, Wines was announced as one of the club's first-ever co-captains, alongside Tom Jonas. While traditionally the club's captain would wear the no. 1 guernsey during their captaincy, because there was more than one captain, the no. 1 guernsey was retired, and Wines retained his no. 16 guernsey. Wines was made vice-captain in 2020, with Jonas assuming sole responsibility for the captaincy.

Wines endured a frustrating 2019 season, with an injury-interrupted pre-season occurred due to a shoulder operation as a result of a waterskiing incident over the Australia Day weekend. He returned from his shoulder injury in Round 3 of the 2019 AFL season with 19 disposals and a goal against the Brisbane Lions. Following a fracture in his fibula against the Pies in Round 7, Wines missed a further 7 games and returned in Round 14 to play another 3 in a row. He managed to play 12 games in 2019 and averaged 24.7 disposals.

In June 2020, Wines was suspended for one match for breaching AFL COVID-19 protocols, after he conducted an interview with Channel Seven at the front of his house, with this suspension causing him to miss the season's only Showdown.

Wines had an outstanding season in 2021, which led to him being awarded the 2021 Brownlow Medal.

== Statistics ==
Updated to the end of round 22, 2026.

Legend
G	Goals	K	Kicks	D	Disposals	T	Tackles
B	Behinds	H	Handballs	M	Marks
±	Won that season's Brownlow Medal

Season	Team	No.	Games	Totals							Averages (per game)							Votes
Season	Team	No.	Games	G	B	K	H	D	M	T	G	B	K	H	D	M	T	Votes
2013	Port Adelaide	16	24	8	10	215	236	451	80	93	0.3	0.4	9.0	9.8	18.8	3.3	3.9	1
2014	Port Adelaide	16	25	14	13	251	358	609	71	124	0.6	0.5	10.0	14.3	24.4	2.8	5.0	5
2015	Port Adelaide	16	13	4	2	149	169	318	35	68	0.3	0.2	11.5	13.0	24.5	2.7	5.2	6
2016	Port Adelaide	16	22	11	13	262	314	576	63	128	0.5	0.6	11.9	14.3	26.2	2.9	5.8	11
2017	Port Adelaide	16	23	15	16	284	344	628	79	117	0.7	0.7	12.3	15.0	27.3	3.4	5.1	18
2018	Port Adelaide	16	22	4	9	269	305	574	72	111	0.2	0.4	12.2	13.9	26.1	3.3	5.0	14
2019	Port Adelaide	16	12	7	4	135	168	303	41	59	0.6	0.3	11.3	14.0	25.3	3.4	4.9	6
2020 (Note: The 2020 season was played with 17 home-and-away matches per team (down from 22) and 16-minute quarters with time on (down from 20-minute quarters with time on) due to the impact of the COVID-19 pandemic.)	Port Adelaide	16	17	8	5	177	194	371	30	64	0.5	0.3	10.4	11.4	21.8	1.8	3.8	10
2021	Port Adelaide	16	24	10	15	362	415	777	100	105	0.4	0.6	15.1	17.3	32.4	4.2	4.4	36^{±}
2022	Port Adelaide	16	21	6	11	264	332	596	84	84	0.3	0.5	12.6	15.8	28.4	4.0	4.0	13
2023	Port Adelaide	16	25	6	5	201	342	543	84	85	0.2	0.2	8.0	13.7	21.7	3.4	3.4	0
2024	Port Adelaide	16	25	7	10	251	337	588	103	119	0.3	0.4	10.0	13.5	23.5	4.1	4.8	11
2025	Port Adelaide	16	20	3	7	197	311	508	77	86	0.2	0.4	9.9	15.6	25.4	3.9	4.3	2
2026	Port Adelaide	16	17	2	3	123	233	356	66	64	0.1	0.2	7.2	13.7	20.9	3.9	3.8	0
Career			290	105	123	3140	4058	7198	985	1307	0.4	0.4	10.8	14.0	24.8	3.4	4.5	133

== Honours and achievements ==
Team

- AFL minor premiership/McClelland Trophy (Port Adelaide): 2020

Individual

- Port Adelaide co-captain: 2019
- Brownlow Medal: 2021
- All-Australian team: 2021
- John Cahill Medal: 2021
- Peter Badcoe VC Medal: 2021
- AFL Rising Star nominee: 2013

== Personal life ==
In May 2025, Wines and his partner Olivia announced that they were expecting their first child.
