= List of Greater Western Sydney Giants seasons =

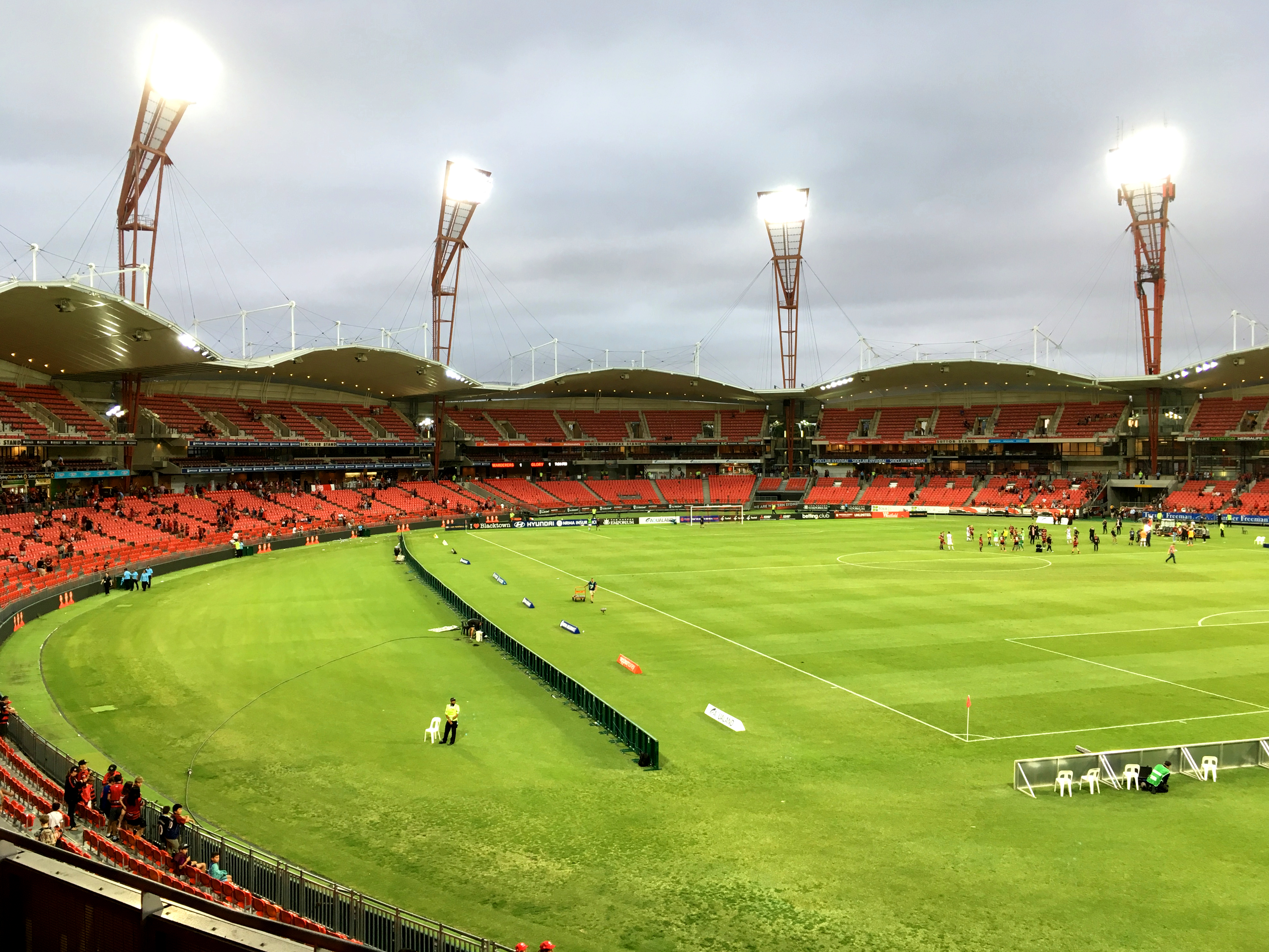
Spotless Stadium, the current home stadium of the Greater Western Sydney Giants.

The Greater Western Sydney Giants, also known as the GWS Giants, are an Australian rules football club based in the Greater Western Sydney region of New South Wales. The club joined the Australian Football League (AFL) as an expansion club, playing their first match during the first round of the 2012 AFL season. In their first twelve completed seasons, the club qualified for the finals series on six occasions, with one Grand Final appearance and no premierships.

== Key ==
Table key
‡	Finished the home and away season in first position (minor premiers)
†	Finished the home and away season in last position (wooden spoon)
Premiers	Won the AFL premiership in the Grand Final
Runners-up	Lost the Grand Final
PF	Did not progress past the preliminary finals
SF	Did not progress past the semi-finals
EF	Did not progress past the elimination finals
DNQ	Did not qualify for finals
^	Denotes caretaker coach
+	Joint winner

== Seasons ==
Greater Western Sydney Giants's AFL record by season
Season	League	Home and away results				Finals results	Coach	Captain	Best and fairest	Leading goalkicker		Ref.
Season	League	Ladder	W	L	D	Finals results	Coach	Captain	Best and fairest	Leading goalkicker		Ref.
2012	AFL (1)	18th^{†}	2	20	0	DNQ	Kevin Sheedy	Phil Davis, Luke Power, Callan Ward	Callan Ward	Jeremy Cameron	29	
2013	AFL (2)	18th^{†}	1	21	0	DNQ	Kevin Sheedy	Phil Davis, Callan Ward	Jeremy Cameron	Jeremy Cameron (2)	62	
2014	AFL (3)	16th	6	16	0	DNQ	Leon Cameron	Phil Davis, Callan Ward	Shane Mumford	Jeremy Cameron (3)	29	
2015	AFL (4)	11th	11	11	0	DNQ	Leon Cameron	Phil Davis, Callan Ward	Heath Shaw	Jeremy Cameron (4)	63	
2016	AFL (5)	4th	16	6	0	PF	Leon Cameron	Phil Davis, Callan Ward	Toby Greene	Jeremy Cameron (5)	53	
2017	AFL (6)	4th	14	6	2	PF	Leon Cameron	Phil Davis, Callan Ward	Josh Kelly	Jeremy Cameron (6), Jonathon Patton, Toby Greene	45	
2018	AFL (7)	7th	13	8	1	SF	Leon Cameron	Phil Davis, Callan Ward	Lachie Whitfield	Jeremy Cameron (7)	46	
2019	AFL (8)	6th	13	9	0	Runners-up (1)	Leon Cameron	Phil Davis, Callan Ward	Tim Taranto	Jeremy Cameron (8)	76	
2020	AFL (9)	10th	8	9	0	DNQ	Leon Cameron	Stephen Coniglio	Nick Haynes, Lachie Whitfield (2)	Jeremy Cameron (9)	24	
2021	AFL (10)	7th	11	10	1	SF	Leon Cameron	Stephen Coniglio	Josh Kelly	Toby Greene (2)	42	
2022	AFL (11)	16th	6	16	0	DNQ	Leon Cameron, Mark McVeigh	Stephen Coniglio, Toby Greene, Josh Kelly	Sam Taylor	Toby Greene (3)	37	
2023	AFL (12)	7th	13	10	0	PF	Adam Kingsley	Toby Greene	Toby Greene (2)	Toby Greene (4)	66	
2024	AFL (13)	4th	15	8	0	SF	Adam Kingsley	Toby Greene	Jesse Hogan	Jesse Hogan	77	
2025	AFL (14)	5th	16	7	0	EF	Adam Kingsley	Toby Greene	Tom Green	Jesse Hogan (2)	46	
