= 2015 Greater Western Sydney Giants season =

Australian Football League team season

Greater Western Sydney Giants
2015 season
- Coach: Leon Cameron
- Captains: Phil Davis; Callan Ward
- Home grounds: Spotless Stadium (Capacity: 25,000); StarTrack Oval (Capacity: 13,550)
- Leading goalkicker: Jeremy Cameron (63)
- Highest home attendance: 14,667 (Round 17 vs Geelong)
- Lowest home attendance: 6,917 (Round 4 vs Gold Coast)

The Greater Western Sydney Giants' 2015 season was its 4th season in the Australian Football League (AFL).

== Club summary ==
The 2015 AFL season was the 119th season of the VFL/AFL competition since its inception in 1897; having entered the competition in 2012, it was the 4th season contested by the Greater Western Sydney Giants. Spotless Stadium once again acted as the club's primary home ground, hosting eight of the club's eleven home games, with three games played at their secondary home ground, StarTrack Oval in Canberra. The three matches at StarTrack Oval were against Melbourne, the Gold Coast Suns and Geelong in rounds 2, 4 and 17 respectively.

Because Spotless Stadium was unavailable for the first five rounds of the regular season due to its required use by the Sydney Royal Easter Show, the club played its first two home games in Canberra, while the first of the two annual Sydney Derbies against the Sydney Swans were played at the Sydney Cricket Ground in Round 3, with the Giants hosting the return fixture in Round 21. The club played Carlton, Gold Coast, Melbourne, St Kilda and Sydney twice during the regular season, and traveled interstate ten times (six times to Melbourne, twice to Perth and once each to the Gold Coast and Adelaide).

Major sponsors Virgin Australia and Lifebroker continued as the club's two major sponsors, while BLK will manufacture the club's on-and-off field apparel for the next five seasons starting in 2015.

== Senior Personnel ==
Leon Cameron continued as the club's head coach for the second consecutive season, while Callan Ward and Phil Davis continued as the club's co-captains for the fourth consecutive season. Both have held their respective positions since 2014 and 2012, respectively.

== 2015 player squad ==
Greater Western Sydney Giants
Senior squad		Rookie List	Coaching staff
1 Phil Davis (c); 2 Curtly Hampton; 3 Stephen Coniglio; 4 Toby Greene; 5 Dylan Shiel; 6 Lachie Whitfield; 7 Rhys Palmer; 8 Callan Ward (c); 9 Tom Scully (vc); 10 Devon Smith; 11 Jed Lamb; 12 Jonathon Patton; 13 Paul Ahern; 14 Tomas Bugg; 15 Tim Golds; 16 Nathan Wilson; 17 Adam Treloar; 18 Jeremy Cameron; 19 Nick Haynes; 20 Adam Tomlinson; 21 Matthew Buntine; 22 Josh Kelly; 23 Heath Shaw (vc); 24 Joel Patfull	25 Cam McCarthy; 26 Jarrod Pickett; 27 Andrew Phillips; 28 Liam Sumner; 29 Zac Williams; 30 Lachie Plowman; 31 Jacob Townsend; 32 Ryan Griffen; 33 Will Hoskin-Elliott; 34 Caleb Marchbank; 35 Aidan Corr; 36 James Stewart; 37 Rory Lobb; 38 Jack Steele; 39 Tim Mohr; 40 Adam Kennedy; 41 Shane Mumford; 42 Pat McKenna; 43 Jake Barrett; 44 Tom Downie; 46 Dylan Addison; 47 Jeremy Finlayson	45 Sam Schulz	Head coach: Leon Cameron; Assistant coaches: Alan McConnell (Senior Assistant); Luke Power (Defence); Chad Cornes (Forwards); Brett Hand (NEAFL coach); Dean Brogan (Ruck coach); Amon Buchanan (Development); Sam Reid (Development); Mark McVeigh (Academy Head Coach); Simon Katich (Player Development Coordinator) Assistant coaches; James McDonald (Midfield); Luke Power (Defence); Chad Cornes (Forwards); Brett Hand (NEAFL coach); Dean Brogan (Ruck coach); Amon Buchanan (Development); Sam Reid (Development); Mark McVeigh (Academy Head Coach); Simon Katich (Player Development Coordinator); Legend: (c) Captain(s); (vc) Vice-captain(s); Long-term injury list; Upgraded rookie(s); Updated: 30 January 2014; Source(s): A Numbers Game

== Playing list changes ==
The Giants underwent an overhaul of their playing list during the off-season, bringing in experienced players Joel Patfull and Ryan Griffen from the Brisbane Lions and Western Bulldogs, respectively, during the trade period. In addition to Josh Hunt and Stephen Gilham announcing their retirements shortly before the conclusion of the regular season, the club also offloaded several key players, including the previous year's number one draft pick, Tom Boyd, who wanted to be traded to the Western Bulldogs after only one season at the Giants, Kristian Jaksch and Mark Whiley, who were both traded to Carlton, Jonathan Giles, who requested a trade home to South Australia but ultimately ended up at Essendon, and Sam Frost, who was traded to Melbourne after also requesting a trade back to his home state.

The following summarises all player changes between the conclusion of the 2014 season and the commencement of the 2015 season.

=== In ===
Player	Previous club	League	via
Joel Patfull	Brisbane Lions	Australian Football League	AFL Trade Period
Ryan Griffen	Western Bulldogs	Australian Football League	AFL Trade Period
Jarrod Pickett	South Fremantle Football Club	WAFL	AFL Draft
Caleb Marchbank	Murray Bushrangers	TAC Cup	AFL Draft
Paul Ahern	Calder Cannons	TAC Cup	AFL Draft
Pat McKenna	Gisborne Football Club	Bendigo Football League	AFL Draft
Jack Steele	Belconnen Football Club	NEAFL	AFL Draft

=== Out ===
Player	New Club	League	via
Josh Hunt	Retirement	N/A	N/A
Stephen Gilham	Retirement	N/A	N/A
Jonathan O'Rourke	Hawthorn	Australian Football League	AFL Trade Period
Kristian Jaksch	Carlton	Australian Football League	AFL Trade Period
Mark Whiley	Carlton	Australian Football League	AFL Trade Period
Tom Boyd	Western Bulldogs	Australian Football League	AFL Trade Period
Jonathan Giles	Essendon	Australian Football League	AFL Trade Period
Sam Frost	Melbourne	Australian Football League	AFL Trade Period

== Season summary ==
=== Pre-season matches ===
The club played three practice matches as part of the 2015 NAB Challenge, which were played under modified pre-season rules, including nine-point goals.

**Rd**	**Date and local time**	**Opponent**	**Scores** (Greater Western Sydney's scores indicated in **bold**)			**Venue**	**Attendance**
**Rd**	**Date and local time**	**Opponent**	Home	Away	Result	**Venue**	**Attendance**
1	Saturday, 7 March (4:10 pm)	Gold Coast	**0.14.10 (94)**	2.6.4 (58)	Won by 36 points	Blacktown International Sportspark	1,787
2	Friday, 13 March (7:10 pm)	Essendon	**0.14.13 (97)**	0.8.4 (52)	Won by 45 points	Spotless Stadium	2,505
3	Sunday, 22 March (1:10 pm)	Sydney	**0.9.13 (67)**	0.11.7 (73)	Lost by 6 points	StarTrack Oval	???

=== Premiership Season ===
==== Home and away season ====
**Rd**	**Date and local time**	**Opponent**	**Scores** (Greater Western Sydney's scores indicated in **bold**)			**Venue**	**Attendance**	**Ladder** **position**
**Rd**	**Date and local time**	**Opponent**	Home	Away	Result	**Venue**	**Attendance**	**Ladder** **position**
1	Sunday, 5 April (1:10 pm)	St Kilda	11.12 (78)	**12.15 (87)**	Won by 9 points	Etihad Stadium (A)	18,794	7th
2	Saturday, 11 April (2:10 pm)	Melbourne	**15.11 (101)**	8.8 (56)	Won by 45 points	StarTrack Oval (H)	7,760	3rd
3	Saturday, 18 April (4:35 pm)	Sydney	16.15 (111)	**12.18 (90)**	Lost by 21 points	Sydney Cricket Ground (A)	31,966	7th
4	Saturday, 25 April (5:40 pm)	Gold Coast	**16.23 (119)**	7.11 (53)	Won by 66 points	StarTrack Oval (H)	6,917	2nd
5	Saturday, 2 May (5:40 pm)	West Coast	18.12 (120)	**4.9 (33)**	Lost by 87 points	Domain Stadium (A)	34,554	8th
6	Saturday, 9 May (4:35 pm)	Hawthorn	**16.12 (108)**	14.14 (98)	Won by 10 points	Spotless Stadium (H)	13,556	6th
7	Saturday, 16 May (4:35 pm)	Carlton	9.3 (57)	**19.21 (135)**	Won by 78 points	Etihad Stadium (A)	16,676	5th
8	Saturday, 23 May (2:10 pm)	Adelaide	**16.12 (108)**	12.12 (84)	Won by 24 points	Spotless Stadium (H)	9,481	4th
9	Saturday, 30 May (4:35 pm)	Western Bulldogs	16.17 (113)	**11.2 (68)**	Lost by 45 points	Etihad Stadium (A)	16,395	5th
10	Sunday, 7 June (1:10 pm)	Brisbane Lions	**14.13 (97)**	10.7 (67)	Won by 30 points	Spotless Stadium (H)	9,079	5th
11	Sunday, 14 June (1:10 pm)	Collingwood	18.11 (119)	**11.11 (77)**	Lost by 42 points	Melbourne Cricket Ground (A)	43,390	5th
12	Saturday, 20 June (4:35 pm)	North Melbourne	**8.13 (61)**	18.9 (117)	Lost by 56 points	Spotless Stadium (H)	7,824	6th
13	Bye							
14	Saturday, 4 July (1:40 pm)	Richmond	10.18 (78)	**10.9 (69)**	Lost by 9 points	Melbourne Cricket Ground (A)	35,968	9th
15	Sunday, 12 July (1:10 pm)	St Kilda	**12.12 (84)**	6.13 (49)	Won by 35 points	Spotless Stadium (H)	9,178	8th
16	Saturday, 18 July (2:10 pm)	Gold Coast	12.7 (79)	**13.16 (94)**	Won by 15 points	Metricon Stadium (A)	9,589	7th
17	Saturday, 25 July (1:45 pm)	Geelong	**6.6 (42)**	9.15 (69)	Lost by 27 points	StarTrack Oval (H)	14,667	9th
18	Sunday, 2 August (2:40 pm)	Fremantle	12.12 (84)	**9.9 (63)**	Lost by 21 points	Domain Stadium (A)	34,626	10th
19	Sunday, 9 August (3:20 pm)	Essendon	**14.9 (93)**	8.13 (61)	Won by 32 points	Spotless Stadium (H)	10,093	10th
20	Saturday, 15 August (4:05 pm)	Port Adelaide	16.15 (111)	**13.12 (90)**	Lost by 21 points	Adelaide Oval (A)	33,281	10th
21	Saturday, 22 August (2:10 pm)	Sydney				Spotless Stadium (H)		
22	Saturday, 29 August (1:45 pm)	Carlton				Spotless Stadium (H)		
23	TBD	Melbourne				Etihad Stadium (A)		

== Ladder ==
Pos	Team	Pld	W	L	D	PF	PA	PP	Pts	Qualification
1	Fremantle	22	17	5	0	1857	1564	118.7	68	Finals series
2	West Coast	22	16	5	1	2330	1572	148.2	66	Finals series
3	Hawthorn (P)	22	16	6	0	2452	1548	158.4	64	Finals series
4	Sydney	22	16	6	0	2006	1578	127.1	64	Finals series
5	Richmond	22	15	7	0	1930	1568	123.1	60	Finals series
6	Western Bulldogs	22	14	8	0	2101	1825	115.1	56	Finals series
7	Adelaide	21	13	8	0	2107	1821	115.7	54 (Note: The round 14 match between Adelaide and Geelong was cancelled due to the death of Adelaide coach Phil Walsh, and both teams were awarded two premiership points each.)	Finals series
8	North Melbourne	22	13	9	0	2062	1937	106.5	52	Finals series
9	Port Adelaide	22	12	10	0	2002	1874	106.8	48	
10	Geelong	21	11	9	1	1853	1833	101.1	48	
11	Greater Western Sydney	22	11	11	0	1872	1891	99.0	44	
12	Collingwood	22	10	12	0	1972	1856	106.3	40	
13	Melbourne	22	7	15	0	1573	2044	77.0	28	
14	St Kilda	22	6	15	1	1695	2162	78.4	26	
15	Essendon	22	6	16	0	1580	2134	74.0	24	
16	Gold Coast	22	4	17	1	1633	2240	72.9	18	
17	Brisbane Lions	22	4	18	0	1557	2306	67.5	16	
18	Carlton	22	4	18	0	1525	2354	64.8	16	

Rules for classification: 1) points; 2) percentage; 3) number of points for.
(P) Premiers

== Awards, Records & Milestones ==
=== Awards ===
- Round 2:
  - Prime Minister's Cup (AFL)

=== Records ===
As 2015 was Greater Western Sydney's best season since the club was admitted to the competition, a large range of records and milestones were met and broken during the season:

- Round 1:
  - Greater Western Sydney's first win over St Kilda in a premiership match
  - Greater Western Sydney's third consecutive away win
- Round 2:
  - Greater Western Sydney's third consecutive win (club record)
  - Highest score in any quarter: 9.2 (56) in the third quarter
  - Highest score in any half: 13.5 (83) in the second half
  - Biggest turnaround in a premiership match (78 points; were 33 points down in the second quarter, went on to win by 45)
- Round 4:
  - Highest ladder placing after a completed round: 2nd
- Round 6:
  - Greater Western Sydney's first win over Hawthorn in a premiership match
  - Greater Western Sydney's first win against a defending premier
  - Equal most goals kicked in a match by a Giants player: Jeremy Cameron (7.0, also kicked that many against Collingwood in Round 18, 2013)
  - Most goals kicked by in a match by a Giants player at Sydney Showground Stadium: Jeremy Cameron (7.0)
- Round 7:
  - Greater Western Sydney's greatest winning margin (78 points)
  - Greater Western Sydney's highest ever score (19.21 (135))
- Round 8:
  - Greater Western Sydney's best ever first quarter score (6.4 (40))
  - Greater Western Sydney's first win over Adelaide in a premiership match
- Round 10:
  - Greater Western Sydney's win over the Brisbane Lions was their seventh victory for the season, thus breaking the record for most wins in a single season.

=== Milestones ===
- Round 1:
  - Ryan Griffen – First game for Greater Western Sydney
  - Joel Patfull – First game for Greater Western Sydney
  - Tomas Bugg – 50th AFL game
  - Dylan Shiel – 50th AFL game
- Round 4:
  - Rhys Palmer – 100th AFL game
- Round 6:
  - Stephen Coniglio – 50th AFL game
- Round 9:
  - Heath Shaw – 200th AFL game
- Round 12:
  - Caleb Marchbank – AFL debut
  - Jack Steele – AFL debut
- Round 16:
  - Curtly Hampton – 50th AFL game
  - Tom Scully – 100th AFL game
- Round 17:
  - Adam Tomlinson – 50th AFL game

== Brownlow Medal ==
=== Results ===
Round	1 vote	2 votes	3 votes
1			
2			
3			
4			
5			
6			
7			
8			
9			
10			
11			
12			
13			
14			
15			
16			
17			
18			
19			
20			
21			
22			
23			

=== Brownlow Medal tally ===
Player	1 vote games	2 vote games	3 vote games	Total votes
Total				

- italics denotes ineligible player

== Tribunal cases ==
Player	Round	Charge category	Verdict	Points^{[a]}	Result	Victim	Club	Ref(s)
Devon Smith	7	Rough conduct	Guilty	N/A	$1,000 fine	Bryce Gibbs	Carlton	

== Notes ==
- ^{a} "Points" refers to carry-over points accrued following the sanction. For example, 154.69 points draw a one-match suspension, with 54.69 carry-over points (for every 100 points, a one-match suspension is given).
