= 2016 Greater Western Sydney Giants season =

Greater Western Sydney Giants
2016 season
- Coach: Leon Cameron
- Captains: Phil Davis; Callan Ward
- Home ground: Spotless Stadium; Manuka Oval
- AFL season: 4th
- Finals series: Preliminary final
- Kevin Sheedy Medal: Toby Greene
- Leading goalkicker: Jeremy Cameron
- Highest home attendance: 21,790 vs Western Bulldogs (Preliminary final)
- Lowest home attendance: 8,308 vs Gold Coast (Round 8)

The Greater Western Sydney Giants' 2016 season is the club's fifth season in the Australian Football League (AFL). The Giants finished in fourth place at the end of the 2016 season, and won their first ever finals game.

== Playing squad ==
Greater Western Sydney Giants
Senior list		Rookie list	Coaching staff
1 Phil Davis (c); 2 Jacob Hopper; 3 Stephen Coniglio; 4 Toby Greene; 5 Dylan Shiel; 6 Lachie Whitfield; 7 Rhys Palmer; 8 Callan Ward (c); 9 Tom Scully; 10 Devon Smith; 11 Jack Steele; 12 Jonathon Patton; 13 Paul Ahern; 14 Jarrod Pickett; 15 Matthew Kennedy; 16 Nathan Wilson; 17 Steve Johnson; 18 Jeremy Cameron; 19 Nick Haynes; 20 Adam Tomlinson; 21 Matthew Buntine	22 Josh Kelly; 23 Heath Shaw (vc); 24 Joel Patfull; 25 Cam McCarthy; 26 Dawson Simpson; 27 Harrison Himmelberg; 28 Jake Barrett; 29 Zac Williams; 30 Matt Flynn; 31 Jeremy Finlayson; 32 Ryan Griffen; 33 Will Hoskin-Elliott; 34 Caleb Marchbank; 35 Aidan Corr; 36 James Stewart; 37 Rory Lobb; 39 Tim Mohr; 40 Adam Kennedy; 41 Shane Mumford; 42 Pat McKenna; 44 Tom Downie	38 Daniel Lloyd; 50 Sam Reid	Head coach: Leon Cameron; Assistant coaches: Alan McConnell (senior assistant); Mark McVeigh (backline); Luke Power (midfield); Lenny Hayes (midfield); Dean Brogan (ruck/stoppages); Amon Buchanan (forward); Brett Hand (head of development); Brad Miller (NEAFL coach); Legend: (c) Captain(s); (vc) Vice-captain(s); Long-term injury list; Upgraded rookie(s); Updated: 16 June 2016; Source(s): COACHING STAFF, Senior List

== Ladder ==
Pos	Team	Pld	W	L	D	PF	PA	PP	Pts	Qualification
1	Sydney	22	17	5	0	2221	1469	151.2	68	2016 finals
2	Geelong	22	17	5	0	2235	1554	143.8	68	2016 finals
3	Hawthorn	22	17	5	0	2134	1800	118.6	68	2016 finals
4	Greater Western Sydney	22	16	6	0	2380	1663	143.1	64	2016 finals
5	Adelaide	22	16	6	0	2483	1795	138.3	64	2016 finals
6	West Coast	22	16	6	0	2181	1678	130.0	64	2016 finals
7	Western Bulldogs (P)	22	15	7	0	1857	1609	115.4	60	2016 finals
8	North Melbourne	22	12	10	0	1956	1859	105.2	48	2016 finals
9	St Kilda	22	12	10	0	1953	2041	95.7	48	
10	Port Adelaide	22	10	12	0	2055	1939	106.0	40	
11	Melbourne	22	10	12	0	1944	1991	97.6	40	
12	Collingwood	22	9	13	0	1910	1998	95.6	36	
13	Richmond	22	8	14	0	1713	2155	79.5	32	
14	Carlton	22	7	15	0	1568	1978	79.3	28	
15	Gold Coast	22	6	16	0	1778	2273	78.2	24	
16	Fremantle	22	4	18	0	1574	2119	74.3	16	
17	Brisbane Lions	22	3	19	0	1770	2872	61.6	12	
18	Essendon	22	3	19	0	1437	2356	61.0	12	

Source: AFL
Rules for classification: 1) points; 2) percentage; 3) number of points for.
(P) Premiers
