= 2017 Greater Western Sydney Giants season =

6th season in Australian Football League

Greater Western Sydney Giants
2017 season
- President: Tony Shepherd
- Coach: Leon Cameron
- Captains: Phil Davis (co-captain); Callan Ward
- Home ground: Spotless Stadium (capacity: 25,000); Startrack Oval (capacity: 13,550)
- Pre-season: 2 wins, 1 loss
- AFL season: 4th
- Finals series: Preliminary Final
- Best & Fairest: Josh Kelly
- Leading goalkicker: Jeremy Cameron

The 2017 Greater Western Sydney Giants season is the 6th season in the Australian Football League contested by the Greater Western Sydney Giants.

== 2017 season squad ==
Greater Western Sydney Giants
Senior list		Rookie list	Coaching staff
1 Phil Davis (c); 2 Jacob Hopper; 3 Stephen Coniglio; 4 Toby Greene; 5 Dylan Shiel; 6 Lachie Whitfield; 7 Brett Deledio; 8 Callan Ward (c); 9 Tom Scully; 10 Devon Smith; 11 Will Setterfield; 12 Jonathon Patton; 13 Isaac Cumming; 14 Tim Taranto; 15 Matthew Kennedy; 16 Nathan Wilson; 17 Steve Johnson; 18 Jeremy Cameron; 19 Nick Haynes	20 Adam Tomlinson; 21 Matthew Buntine; 22 Josh Kelly; 23 Heath Shaw (vc); 24 Matt de Boer; 26 Dawson Simpson; 27 Harry Himmelberg; 29 Zac Williams; 30 Matt Flynn; 31 Jeremy Finlayson; 32 Ryan Griffen; 33 Lachlan Tiziani; 35 Aidan Corr; 36 Harry Perryman; 37 Rory Lobb; 39 Tim Mohr; 40 Adam Kennedy; 41 Shane Mumford; 44 Tom Downie	25 Tendai Mzungu; 28 Zach Sproule; 38 Daniel Lloyd; 42 Jake Stein (B); 50 Sam Reid; Joel Patfull	Head coach: Leon Cameron; Assistant coaches: Alan McConnell (senior assistant); Amon Buchanan (forwards); Mark McVeigh (backline); Lenny Hayes (midfield); Dean Brogan (ruck/stoppages); Brett Hand (head of development); Nick Walsh (development); Roger Moten (development); Nick Maxwell (leadership); Brad Miller (NEAFL coach); Jason Saddington (academy); Legend: (c) Captain(s); (vc) Vice-captain(s); Long-term injury list; Upgraded rookie(s); (B) Category B rookie; Updated: 22 March 2017; Source(s): Coaching staff, Senior list

== Season summary ==
=== Pre-season ===
**Rd**	**Date and local time**	**Opponent**	**Scores** (Greater Western Sydney's scores indicated in **bold**)			**Venue**	**Attendance**	**Ref.**
**Rd**	**Date and local time**	**Opponent**	Home	Away	Result	**Venue**	**Attendance**	**Ref.**
1	Saturday, 18 February (2:05 pm)	West Coast	**0.10.10 (70)**	0.5.7 (37)	Won by 33 points	Narrandera Sports Stadium (H)	3,984	
2	Friday, 3 March (7:40 pm)	Sydney	**1.4.9 (42)**	0.8.6 (54)	Lost by 12 points	Blacktown International Sportspark (H)	2,695	
3	Friday, 10 March (5:50 pm)	North Melbourne	**2.15.17 (125)**	0.12.15 (87)	Won by 38 points	Manuka Oval (H)	3,997	

=== Home and Away Season ===
**Rd**	**Date and local time**	**Opponent**	**Scores** (Greater Western Sydney's scores indicated in **bold**)			**Venue**	**Attendance**	**Ref.**
**Rd**	**Date and local time**	**Opponent**	Home	Away	Result	**Venue**	**Attendance**	**Ref.**
1	Sunday, 26 March (2:45 pm)	Adelaide	22.15 (147)	**14.7 (91)**	Lost by 56 points	Adelaide Oval (A)	43,993	
2	Saturday, 1 April (4:35 pm)	Gold Coast	**24.16 (160)**	8.10 (58)	Won by 102 points	Spotless Stadium (H)	8,022	
3	Saturday, 8 April (1:45 pm)	North Melbourne	10.7 (67)	**15.19 (109)**	Won by 42 points	Blundstone Arena (A)	8,758	
4	Saturday, 15 April (4:35 pm)	Port Adelaide	**16.16 (112)**	11.15 (81)	Won by 31 points	UNSW Canberra Oval (H)	9,185	
5	Saturday, 22 April (7:25 pm)	Sydney	9.9 (63)	**15.15 (105)**	Won by 42 points	SCG (A)	34,824	
6	Friday, 28 April (7:50 pm)	Western Bulldogs	**11.9 (75)**	9.19 (73)	Won by 2 points	UNSW Canberra Oval (H)	14,048	
7	Friday, 5 May (7:50 pm)	St Kilda	16.12 (108)	**12.13 (85)**	Lost by 23 points	Etihad Stadium (A)	21,160	
8	Saturday, 13 May (4:35 pm)	Collingwood	**15.12 (102)**	15.9 (99)	Won by 3 points	Spotless Stadium (H)	11,360	
9	Saturday, 20 May (4:35 pm)	Richmond	**11.12 (78)**	10.15 (75)	Won by 3 points	Spotless Stadium (H)	10,677	
10	Sunday, 28 May (2:40 pm)	West Coast	14.6 (90)	**14.14 (98)**	Won by 8 points	Domain Stadium (A)	37,057	
11	Saturday, 3 June (4:35 pm)	Essendon	**18.9 (117)**	15.11 (101)	Won by 16 points	Spotless Stadium (H)	13,671	
12	Sunday, 11 June (3:20 pm)	Carlton	10.11 (71)	**9.16 (70)**	Lost by 1 point	Etihad Stadium (A)	23,194	
13	Bye							
14	Saturday, 24 June (4:35 pm)	Brisbane Lions	12.14 (86)	**22.14 (146)**	Won by 60 points	Gabba (A)	11,455	
15	Saturday, 1 July (7:25 pm)	Geelong	**10.8 (68)**	10.8 (68)	Match drawn	Spotless Stadium (H)	15,007	
16	Saturday, 8 July (1:45 pm)	Hawthorn	14.13 (97)	**15.7 (97)**	Match drawn	University of Tasmania Stadium (A)	12,156	
17	Saturday, 15 July (7:25 pm)	Sydney	**12.11 (83)**	14.12 (96)	Lost by 13 points	Spotless Stadium (H)	21,924	
18	Sunday, 23 July (1:10 pm)	Richmond	9.10 (64)	**6.9 (45)**	Lost by 19 points	MCG (A)	33,467	
19	Saturday, 29 July (2:10 pm)	Fremantle	**13.20 (98)**	13.8 (86)	Won by 12 points	Spotless Stadium (H)	11,233	
20	Saturday, 5 August (1:45 pm)	Melbourne	**14.13 (97)**	10.2 (62)	Won by 35 points	UNSW Canberra Oval (H)	14,274	
21	Friday, 11 August (7:50 pm)	Western Bulldogs	7.15 (57)	**16.9 (105)**	Won by 48 points	Etihad Stadium (A)	30,672	
22	Saturday, 19 August (4:35 pm)	West Coast	**12.9 (81)**	9.6 (60)	Won by 21 points	Spotless Stadium (H)	15,751	
23	Saturday, 26 August (7:25 pm)	Geelong	15.13 (103)	**8.11 (59)**	Lost by 44 points	Simonds Stadium (A)	30,087	

=== Finals ===
**Rd**	**Date and local time**	**Opponent**	**Scores** (Greater Western Sydney's scores indicated in **bold**)			**Venue**	**Attendance**	**Ref.**
**Rd**	**Date and local time**	**Opponent**	Home	Away	Result	**Venue**	**Attendance**	**Ref.**
QF1	Thursday, 7 September (7:20 pm)	Adelaide	12.12 (84)	**6.12 (48)**	Lost by 36 points	Adelaide Oval (A)	52,805	
SF1	Saturday, 16 September (7:25 pm)	West Coast	**19.11 (125)**	9.4 (58)	Won by 67 points	Spotless Stadium (H)	14,865	
PF2	Saturday, 23 September (4:45 pm)	Richmond	15.13 (103)	**9.13 (67)**	Lost by 36 points	MCG (A)	94,258	

== Ladder ==
Pos	Team	Pld	W	L	D	PF	PA	PP	Pts	Qualification
1	Adelaide	22	15	6	1	2415	1776	136.0	62	2017 finals
2	Geelong	22	15	6	1	2134	1818	117.4	62	2017 finals
3	Richmond (P)	22	15	7	0	1992	1684	118.3	60	2017 finals
4	Greater Western Sydney	22	14	6	2	2081	1812	114.8	60	2017 finals
5	Port Adelaide	22	14	8	0	2168	1671	129.7	56	2017 finals
6	Sydney	22	14	8	0	2093	1651	126.8	56	2017 finals
7	Essendon	22	12	10	0	2135	2004	106.5	48	2017 finals
8	West Coast	22	12	10	0	1964	1858	105.7	48	2017 finals
9	Melbourne	22	12	10	0	2035	1934	105.2	48	
10	Western Bulldogs	22	11	11	0	1857	1913	97.1	44	
11	St Kilda	22	11	11	0	1925	1986	96.9	44	
12	Hawthorn	22	10	11	1	1864	2055	90.7	42	
13	Collingwood	22	9	12	1	1944	1963	99.0	38	
14	Fremantle	22	8	14	0	1607	2160	74.4	32	
15	North Melbourne	22	6	16	0	1983	2264	87.6	24	
16	Carlton	22	6	16	0	1594	2038	78.2	24	
17	Gold Coast	22	6	16	0	1756	2311	76.0	24	
18	Brisbane Lions	22	5	17	0	1877	2526	74.3	20	

Source: AFL
Rules for classification: 1) points; 2) percentage; 3) number of points for.
(P) Premiers
