= List of Greater Western Sydney Giants leading goalkickers =

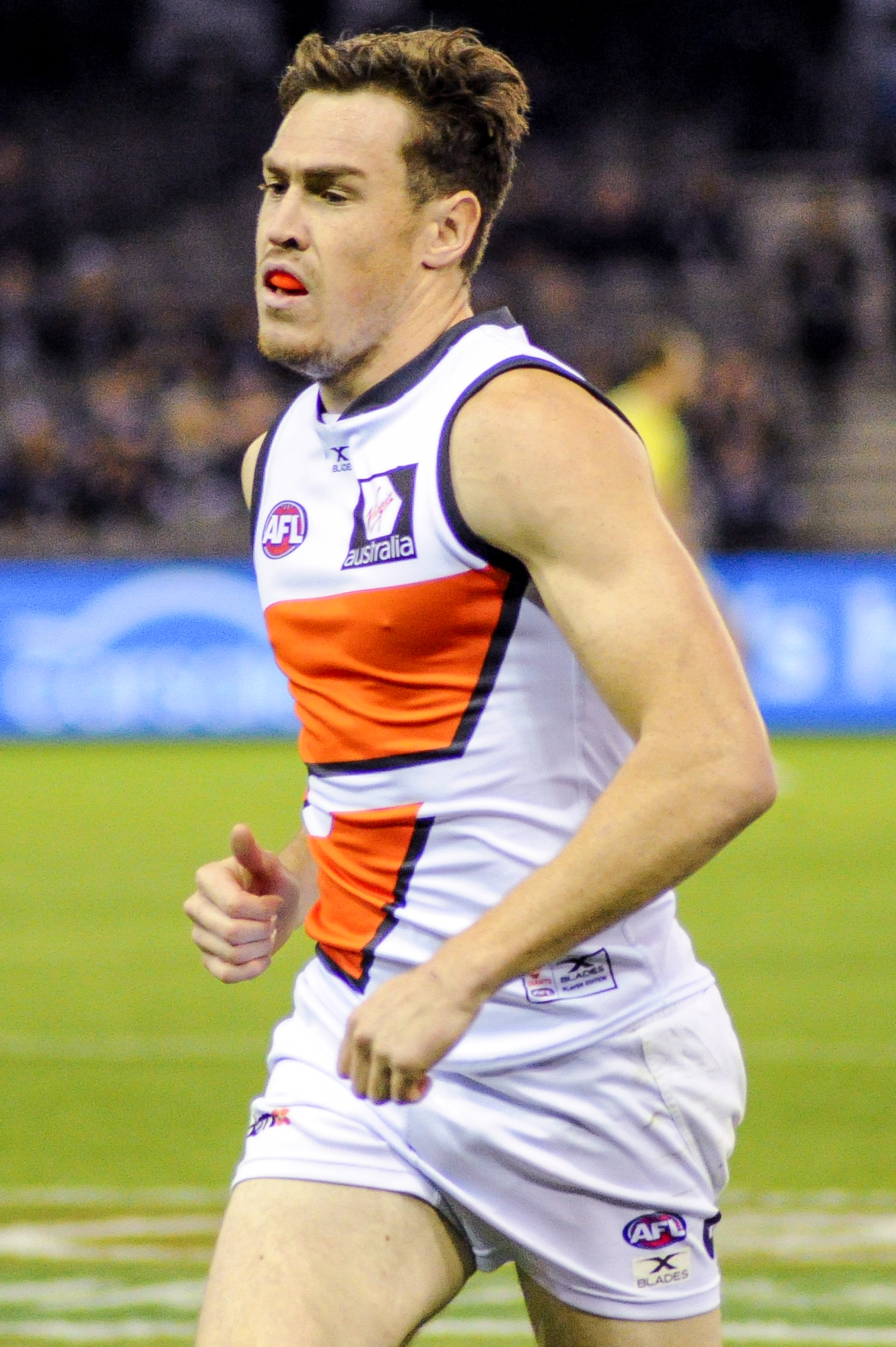
Jeremy Cameron has been Greater Western Sydney's leading goalkicker in a record nine seasons.

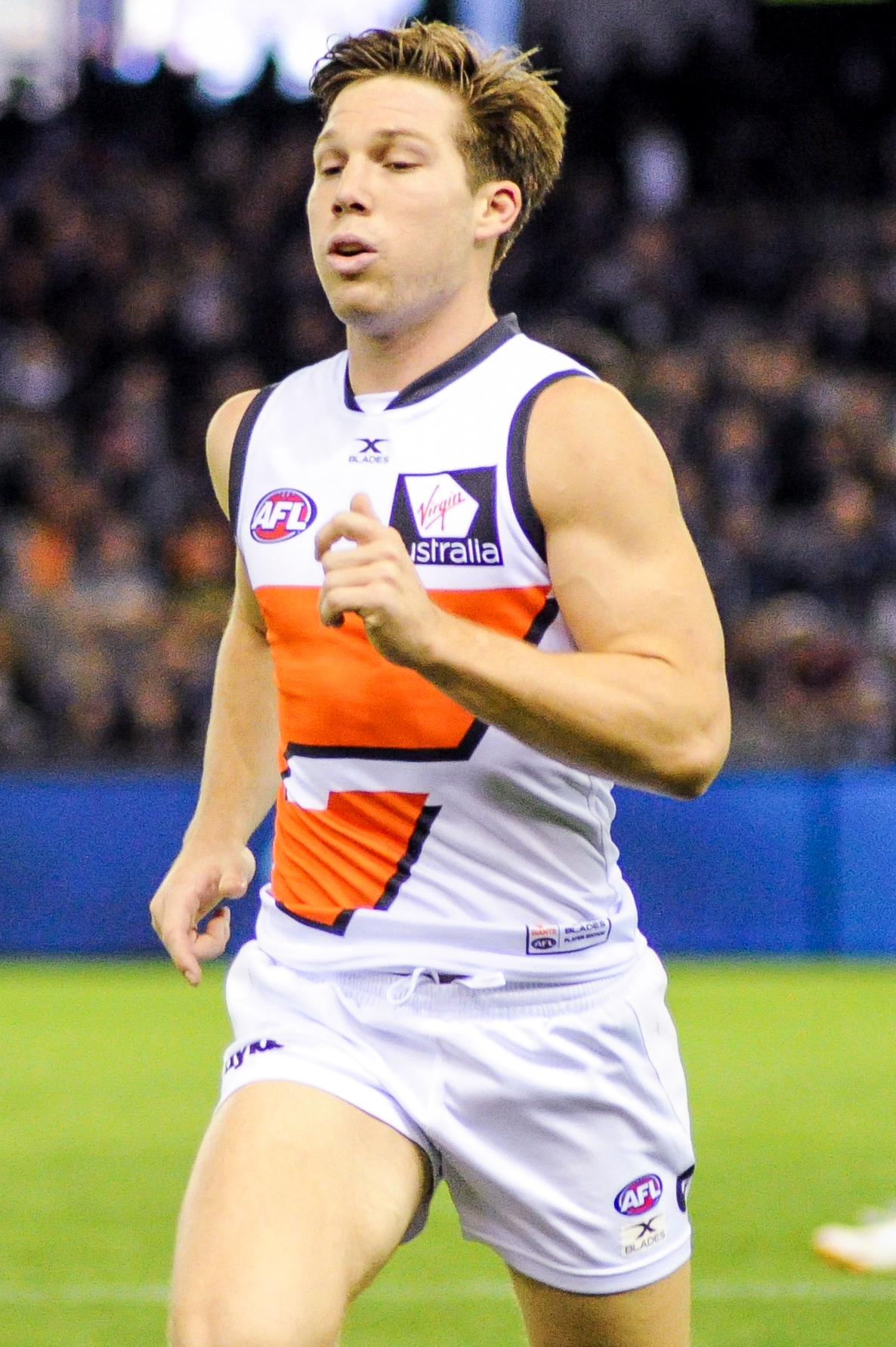
Toby Greene has been Greater Western Sydney's leading goalkicker in four seasons.

The following is a list of Greater Western Sydney Giants (GWS) leading goalkickers in each of their seasons in the Australian Football League (AFL) and AFL Women's. Jeremy Cameron holds the record with the most goals kicked in a season for GWS and the record for most occasions as the club's leading goalkicker. He was their leading goalkicker for nine consecutive seasons from 2012 to 2020. He also won the Coleman Medal in 2019, having kicked 67 goals during the home-and-away season. Jesse Hogan kicked 77 goals in 2024 including finals, a club record. Hogan earned the club's second Coleman Medal.

== AFL leading goalkickers ==
^	Denotes current player
†	Team played finals (which count for the tally)
+	Player won Coleman Medal in same season

Season	Player(s)	Goals
2012	Jeremy Cameron	29
2013	Jeremy Cameron (2)	62
2014	Jeremy Cameron (3)	29
2015	Jeremy Cameron (4)	63
2016	Jeremy Cameron (5)	53†
2017	Jeremy Cameron (6)	45†
2017	Toby Greene^	45†
2017	Jonathon Patton	45†
2018	Jeremy Cameron (7)	46†
2019+	Jeremy Cameron (8)	76†
2020	Jeremy Cameron (9)	24
2021	Toby Greene^ (2)	45†
2022	Toby Greene^ (3)	37
2023	Toby Greene^ (4)	66†
2024+	Jesse Hogan^	77†
2025	Jesse Hogan^ (2)	46†
2026	Jake Stringer^	48

=== Multiple winners ===
Player	Wins	Seasons
Jeremy Cameron	9	2012, 2013, 2014, 2015, 2016, 2017, 2018, 2019, 2020
Toby Greene^	4	2017, 2021, 2022, 2023
Jesse Hogan^	2	2024, 2025

=== Leading career goalkickers ===
Player	Goals	Average
Jeremy Cameron	427	2.50
Toby Greene^	375	1.57
Jesse Hogan^	181	2.41
Harry Himmelberg^	161	0.91
Josh Kelly^	139	0.65
Jonathon Patton	130	1.46
Callan Ward^	124	0.49
Stephen Coniglio^	120	0.55
Devon Smith	100	0.92

=== Most goals in a game ===
Goals	Player	Opponent	Round	Year	Venue
9.5	Jeremy Cameron	Gold Coast	23	2019	Carrara
9.1	Jesse Hogan^	Essendon	23	2023	Sydney Showground
9.0	Jesse Hogan^	West Coast	4	2025	Sydney Showground
7.5	Jeremy Cameron	Richmond	3	2019	Sydney Showground
7.3	Jeremy Cameron	Carlton	22	2015	Sydney Showground
7.2	Toby Greene^	Western Bulldogs	14	2022	Sydney Showground
7.2	Jeremy Cameron	Gold Coast	8	2016	Sydney Showground
7.2	Jake Stringer^	Fremantle	17	2026	Manuka Oval
7.1	Jeremy Cameron	Collingwood	18	2013	MCG

== AFL Women's leading goalkickers ==
^	Denotes current player
†	Team played finals (which count for the tally)

Season	Player(s)	Goals
2017	Phoebe McWilliams	7
2018	Phoebe McWilliams (2)	7
2019	Christina Bernardi	7
2020	Cora Staunton	8†
2021	Cora Staunton (2)	10
2022 (S6)	Cora Staunton (3)	18
2022 (S7)	Cora Staunton (4)	8
2023	Zarlie Goldsworthy^	13
2024	Zarlie Goldsworthy^ (2)	13
2025	Tarni Evans^	13

== See also ==
- Greater Western Sydney Giants Honour Roll
