= 2012 Greater Western Sydney Giants season =

Greater Western Sydney Giants
2012 season
- President: Tony Shepherd
- Coach: Kevin Sheedy (1st season)
- Captains: Phil Davis (1st season); Luke Power (1st season); Callan Ward (1st season)
- Home ground: Skoda Stadium; Manuka Oval; Blacktown International Sportspark

The 2012 Greater Western Sydney Giants season was the club's first season of senior competition in the Australian Football League (AFL). The club also fielded its reserves team in the North East Australian Football League (NEAFL) for its second season, but under the new name University of Western Sydney Giants.

== Club personnel ==
Kevin Sheedy was the first head coach of the Giants, while Mark Williams was the assistant coach.

=== Playing list ===
Playing statistics

^	Denotes player who is on the club's rookie list
#	Denotes nominated rookie where player has been elevated to club's senior list during season, and therefore eligible for senior selection.
†	Denotes player who is on the club's veteran list

Greater Western Sydney's 2012 playing list
Player	#	AFL debut	Games	Goals	Behinds	Kicks	Handballs	Disposals	Marks	Tackles
Taylor Adams	30	Round 5, 2012	15	5	1	167	131	298	51	53
Kurt Aylett	43	Round 17, 2012	1	0	0	5	1	6	2	2
Dean Brogan	10	Round 9, 2001*	9	0	0	58	42	100	35	12
Josh Bruce	47	Round 5, 2012	3	2	1	16	17	33	12	2
Tomas Bugg	14	Round 1, 2012	18	6	3	150	167	317	72	57
Matthew Buntine	21	Round 8, 2012	6	0	2	28	39	67	16	10
Jeremy Cameron	18	Round 1, 2012	16	29	15	115	45	160	80	28
Steve Clifton	24	Round 16, 2012	5	1	0	27	29	56	11	20
Stephen Coniglio	3	Round 1, 2012	12	2	5	140	118	258	58	31
Rhys Cooyou#	49	Round 22, 2012	1	1	0	3	7	10	2	3
Chad Cornes	11	Round 6, 1999*	16	4	3	181	136	317	103	36
Sam Darley	13	Round 8, 2012	9	0	0	82	46	128	32	18
Phil Davis	1	Round 4, 2010*	22	5	1	209	119	328	122	42
Thomas Downie	44	—N/a	0	0	0	0	0	0	0	0
Shaun Edwards	22	Round 4, 2012	10	2	4	91	41	132	31	11
Israel Folau	4	Round 1, 2012	13	2	8	39	41	80	22	18
Sam Frost#	48	Round 17, 2012	3	1	0	23	14	37	14	5
Jonathan Giles	26	Round 1, 2012	20	18	8	177	108	285	70	43
Tim Golds	15	Round 20, 2012	2	0	0	10	8	18	4	1
Toby Greene	35	Round 1, 2012	19	8	10	273	266	539	73	63
Josh Growden	41	—N/a	0	0	0	0	0	0	0	0
Curtly Hampton	2	Round 1, 2012	17	6	8	150	80	230	52	31
Nick Haynes	19	Round 10, 2012	8	1	1	44	34	78	22	17
Jack Hombsch	36	Round 1, 2012	9	0	0	79	51	130	37	18
Will Hoskin-Elliott	33	Round 1, 2012	10	9	2	80	36	116	36	12
Adam Kennedy	40	Round 1, 2012	15	0	1	101	106	207	51	27
James McDonald	38	Round 17, 1997*	13	4	3	100	97	197	31	67
Anthony Miles	25	Round 4, 2012	7	0	0	74	54	128	34	28
Tim Mohr	39	Round 1, 2012	13	1	0	98	60	158	53	24
Setanta Ó hAilpín	37	Round 7, 2005*	1	2	1	3	2	5	1	1
Rhys Palmer	7	Round 2, 2008*	15	9	9	158	128	286	66	34
Jonathon Patton	12	Round 12, 2012	7	4	4	28	20	48	20	9
Andrew Phillips#	27	Round 7, 2012	9	3	2	38	23	61	16	15
Luke Power	6	Round 2, 1998*	20	0	1	227	182	409	84	52
Sam Reid	23	Round 22, 2008*	5	0	0	28	36	64	14	13
Sam Schulz	45	Round 12, 2012	1	1	0	3	0	3	1	2
Tom Scully	9	Round 1, 2010*	19	4	4	177	209	386	51	85
Tim Segrave	46	—N/a	0	0	0	0	0	0	0	0
Dylan Shiel	5	Round 1, 2012	12	5	4	108	120	228	39	46
Devon Smith	34	Round 1, 2012	20	10	19	174	144	318	61	85
Liam Sumner	28	Round 6, 2012	2	2	0	8	12	20	3	4
Adam Tomlinson	20	Round 1, 2012	9	2	1	56	43	99	31	16
Jacob Townsend	31	Round 1, 2012	11	2	3	50	38	88	25	37
Adam Treloar	17	Round 3, 2012	18	12	5	223	157	380	86	48
Dom Tyson	29	Round 1, 2012	10	4	0	68	90	158	46	23
Gerald Ugle	32	Round 17, 2012	1	1	0	4	1	5	3	3
Callan Ward	8	Round 11, 2008*	20	8	11	278	210	488	86	100
Mark Whiley	42	Round 12, 2012	3	0	0	20	15	35	15	5
Nathan Wilson	16	Round 1, 2012	9	6	3	37	19	56	15	20

*= Player made his debut at a club other than Greater Western Sydney.

All statistics taken from AFL.com.au

== Season summary ==
=== Pre-season matches ===
Greater Western Sydney's 2012 NAB Cup fixture (Week 1 – Lightning matches)
Round	Date and local time	Opponent	Scores			Venue	Attendance	Ladder position	Ref
Round	Date and local time	Opponent	Home	Away	Result	Venue	Attendance	Ladder position	Ref
1	Saturday, 18 February (7:15 pm)	Western Bulldogs	1.3.3 (30)	0.5.5 (35)	Lost by 5 points	Blacktown Olympic Park	7,086		
1	Saturday, 18 February (9:25 pm)	Collingwood	0.5.2 (32)	0.5.5 (35)	Lost by 3 points	Blacktown Olympic Park	7,086		

Greater Western Sydney's 2012 NAB Cup fixture (Weeks 2, 3 & 4 – Full-length matches)
Round	Date and local time	Opponent	Scores^{[a]}			Venue	Attendance	Ladder position	Ref
Round	Date and local time	Opponent	Home	Away	Result	Venue	Attendance	Ladder position	Ref
2	Saturday, 3 March (3:40 pm)	Hawthorn	0.4.10 (34)	2.12.18 (108)	Lost by 74 points	Aurora Stadium	5,100		
3	Saturday, 10 March (5:30 pm)	Gold Coast	0.11.10 (76)	1.8.6 (63)	Won by 13 points	Lavington Sports Ground	6,740		
4	Saturday, 17 March (12:30 pm)	Richmond	10.6 (66)	20.20 (140)	Lost by 74 points	Manuka Oval	4,222		

=== Regular season ===
Greater Western Sydney's 2012 AFL season fixture
Round	Date and local time	Opponent	Home	Away	Result	Venue	Attendance	Ladder position	Ref
Round	Date and local time	Opponent	Scores			Venue	Attendance	Ladder position	Ref
1	Saturday, 24 March (7:20 pm)	Sydney	5.7 (37)	14.16 (100)	Lost by 63 points	ANZ Stadium	38,203	18th	
2	Sunday, 8 April (1:10 pm)	North Melbourne	8.6 (54)	28.15 (183)	Lost by 129 points	Blundstone Arena	11,127	18th	
3	Sunday, 15 April (1:10 pm)	West Coast	10.9 (69)	23.12 (150)	Lost by 81 points	Blacktown Olympic Park	6,875	18th	
4	Saturday, 21 April (4:10 pm)	Adelaide	7.8 (50)	13.18 (96)	Lost by 46 points	AAMI Stadium	28,261	18th	
5	Saturday, 28 April (1:45 pm)	Western Bulldogs	9.8 (62)	15.14 (104)	Lost by 42 points	Manuka Oval	9,128	18th	
6	Sunday, 6 May (2:45 pm)	Carlton	6.7 (43)	15.20 (110)	Lost by 67 points	Etihad Stadium	28,213	18th	
7	Saturday, 12 May (1:40 pm)	Gold Coast	13.16 (94)	9.13 (67)	Won by 27 points	Manuka Oval	8,603	16th	
8	Sunday, 20 May (1:40 pm)	Brisbane Lions	5.10 (40)	19.18 (132)	Lost by 92 points	The Gabba	16,049	16th	
9	Saturday, 26 May (7:40 pm)	Essendon	7.11 (53)	18.11 (119)	Lost by 66 points	Skoda Stadium	11,887	16th	
10	Saturday, 2 June (1:45 pm)	Geelong	9.7 (61)	19.12 (126)	Lost by 65 points	Simonds Stadium	17,243	17th	
11	—	Bye	—	—	—	—			
12	Saturday, 16 June (2:10 pm)	Richmond	12.2 (74)	11.20 (86)	Lost by 12 points	Skoda Stadium	7,538	17th	
13	Sunday, 24 June (3:15 pm)	Melbourne	9.3 (57)	20.15 (135)	Lost by 78 points	MCG	20,070	17th	
14	Saturday, 30 June (7:40 pm)	Sydney	5.8 (38)	19.18 (132)	Lost by 94 points	ANZ Stadium	22,565	17th	
15	Sunday, 8 July (1:10 pm)	Hawthorn	4.7 (31)	28.25 (193)	Lost by 162 points	MCG	26,518	17th	
16	Sunday, 15 July (1:10 pm)	Adelaide	8.11 (59)	27.16 (178)	Lost by 119 points	Skoda Stadium	7,669	18th	
17	Sunday, 22 July (2:40 pm)	Fremantle	5.7 (37)	18.24 (132)	Lost by 95 points	Patersons Stadium	28,767	18th	
18	Sunday, 28 July (4:40 pm)	Collingwood	7.12 (54)	26.18 (174)	Lost by 120 points	Skoda Stadium	8,102	18th	
19	Saturday, 4 August (2:10 pm)	Port Adelaide	16.11 (107)	10.13 (73)	Won by 34 points	Skoda Stadium	6,811	17th	
20	Saturday, 11 August (4:40 pm)	Gold Coast	12.7 (79)	16.13 (109)	Lost by 30 points	Metricon Stadium	14,657	18th	
21	Saturday, 18 August (2:10 pm)	Melbourne	9.5 (59)	11.18 (84)	Lost by 25 points	Manuka Oval	7,561	18th	
22	Saturday, 25 August (1:45 pm)	St Kilda	5.5 (35)	25.13 (163)	Lost by 128 points	Etihad Stadium	17,327	18th	
23	Saturday, 1 September (4:40 pm)	North Melbourne	11.11 (77)	16.9 (105)	Lost by 28 points	Skoda Stadium	6,696	18th	

==== Ladder ====
2012 AFL ladder
Pos	Team	Pld	W	L	D	PF	PA	PP	Pts	
1	Hawthorn	22	17	5	0	2679	1733	154.6	68	Finals series
2	Adelaide	22	17	5	0	2428	1833	132.5	68	Finals series
3	Sydney (P)	22	16	6	0	2290	1629	140.6	64	Finals series
4	Collingwood	22	16	6	0	2123	1823	116.5	64	Finals series
5	West Coast	22	15	7	0	2244	1807	124.2	60	Finals series
6	Geelong	22	15	7	0	2209	1886	117.1	60	Finals series
7	Fremantle	22	14	8	0	1956	1691	115.7	56	Finals series
8	North Melbourne	22	14	8	0	2359	2097	112.5	56	Finals series
9	St Kilda	22	12	10	0	2347	1903	123.3	48	
10	Carlton	22	11	11	0	2079	1925	108.0	44	
11	Essendon	22	11	11	0	2091	2090	100.0	44	
12	Richmond	22	10	11	1	2169	1943	111.6	42	
13	Brisbane Lions	22	10	12	0	1904	2092	91.0	40	
14	Port Adelaide	22	5	16	1	1691	2144	78.9	22	
15	Western Bulldogs	22	5	17	0	1542	2301	67.0	20	
16	Melbourne	22	4	18	0	1580	2341	67.5	16	
17	Gold Coast	22	3	19	0	1509	2481	60.8	12	
18	Greater Western Sydney	22	2	20	0	1270	2751	46.2	8	

Rules for classification: 1) points; 2) percentage; 3) number of points for.
(P) Premiers

== NEAFL season ==
=== Results ===
Greater Western Sydney's 2012 NEAFL season fixture
Round	Date and local time	Opponent	Home	Away	Result	Venue	Ladder position	Ref
Round	Date and local time	Opponent	Scores			Venue	Ladder position	Ref
1	Saturday, 24 March (3:50 pm)	Sydney	4.10 (34)	23.13 (151)	Lost by 117 points	ANZ Stadium	8th	
2	—	Bye	—	—	—	—	9th	
3	Saturday, 7 April (1:00 pm)	Brisbane	12.9 (81)	15.19 (109)	Lost by 28 points	Blacktown Olympic Park	9th	
4	Sunday, 15 April (4:15 pm)	Sydney Hills	19.16 (130)	13.19 (94)	Won by 36 points	Blacktown Olympic Park	8th	
5	Saturday, 21 April (1:45 pm)	Queanbeyan	14.14 (98)	13.16 (94)	Won by 4 points	Blacktown Olympic Park	6th	
6	Saturday, 28 April (9:30 am)	Eastlake				Manuka Oval		
