= List of Greater Western Sydney Giants coaches =

The following is a list of the Greater Western Sydney Giants senior coaches in each of their seasons in the Australian Football League.

== Key ==
| # | Order |
| G | Games coached |
| W | Wins |
| L | Losses |
| D | Draws |
| Win% | Winning percentage |
| GF | Total AFL or AFL Women's Grand Final appearances for club |
| P | Total AFL or AFL Women's premierships for club |
| † | Caretaker coach |
| ^ | Premiership coach |

== AFL ==
Statistics are correct to round 6 of the 2025 season

| # | Coach | Season(s) | G | W | L | D | Win% | G | W | L | Win% | Achievements | Ref. |
| # | Coach | Season(s) | All games | | | | | Finals | | | | Achievements | Ref. |
|---|---|---|---|---|---|---|---|---|---|---|---|---|---|
| 1 | Kevin Sheedy | 2012–2013 | 44 | 3 | 41 | 0 | 6.82 | — | — | — | — | | |
| 2 | Leon Cameron | 2014–2022 | 193 | 101 | 88 | 4 | 53.37 | 13 | 7 | 6 | 53.85 | 2019 Runners-up | |
| 3 | Adam Kingsley | 2023– | 75 | 46 | 29 | 0 | 59.65 | 6 | 2 | 4 | 33.3 | | |

=== Acting/Caretaker Coaches ===
| # | Coach | Season(s) | G | W | L | D | Win% | G | W | L | Win% | Achievements | Ref. |
| # | Coach | Season(s) | All games | | | | | Finals | | | | Achievements | Ref. |
|---|---|---|---|---|---|---|---|---|---|---|---|---|---|
| 1 | Mark McVeigh | 2022 | 13 | 4 | 9 | 0 | 30.77 | — | — | — | — | | |

== AFL Women's ==
Statistics are correct to round 4 of the 2025 AFLW season

| # | Coach | Season(s) | G | W | L | D | Win% | G | W | L | Win% | Achievements | Ref. |
| # | Coach | Season(s) | All games | | | | | Finals | | | | Achievements | Ref. |
| 1 | Tim Schmidt | 2017 | 7 | 1 | 5 | 1 | 14.29 | — | — | — | — | | |
| 2 | Alan McConnell | 2018 - 2022 (S6) | 40 | 17 | 22 | 1 | 42.5 | 1 | 0 | 1 | 0% | | |
| 3 | Cameron Bernasconi | 2022 (S7) | 35 | 7 | 27 | 1 | 20.0 | — | — | — | — | | |
