= Phoebe McWilliams =

Australian rules footballer

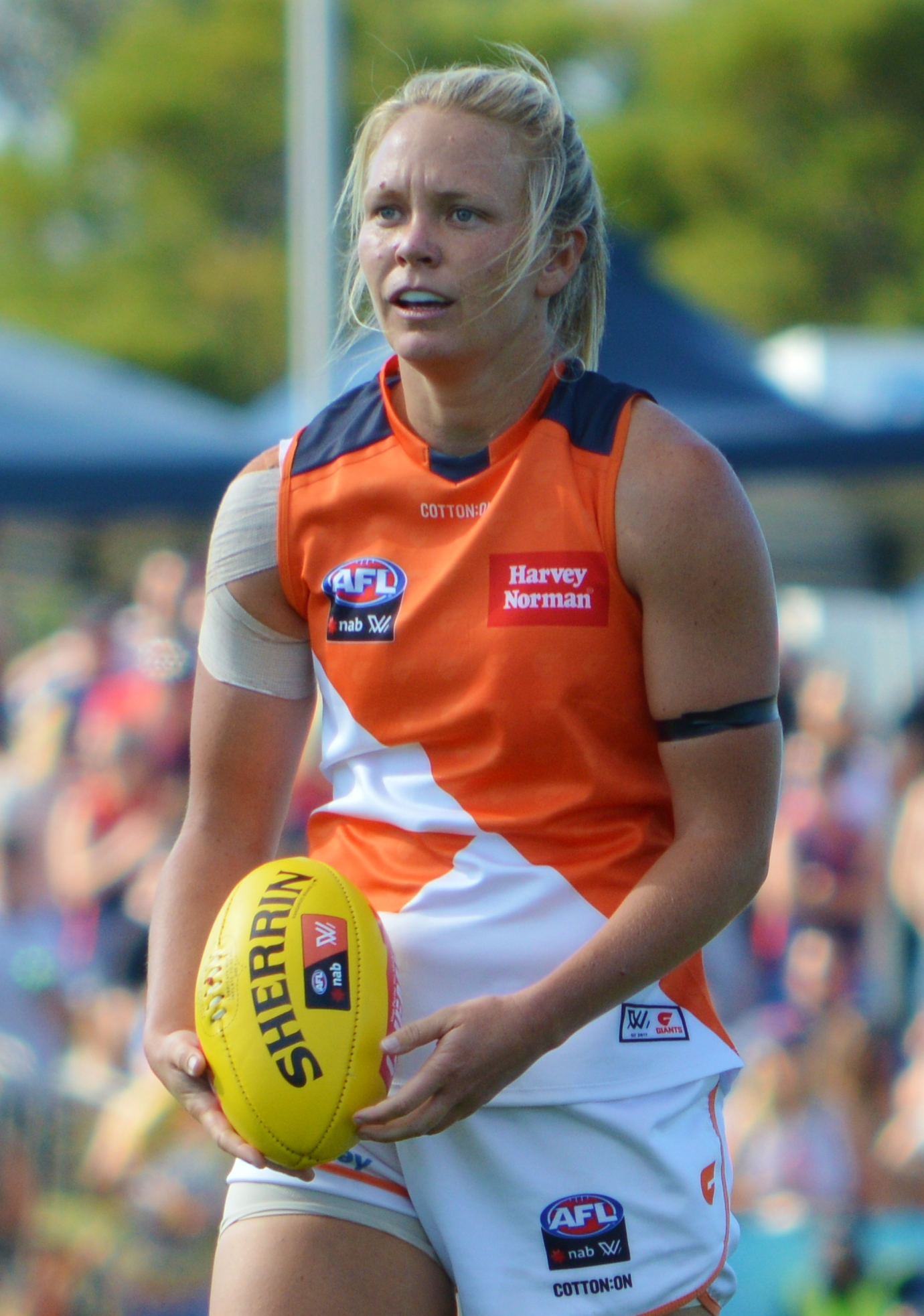
- McWilliams playing for Greater Western Sydney in February 2018

Personal information
- Born: 31 August 1985 (age 41)
- Original team: St Kilda Sharks (VWFL)
- Draft: Priority signing, 2016, Greater Western Sydney
- Debut: Round 1, 2017, Greater Western Sydney vs. Adelaide, at Thebarton Oval
- Height: 178 cm (5 ft 10 in)
- Position: Center half forward

Playing career^{1}
Years	Club	Games (Goals)
2017–2018	Greater Western Sydney	14 (14)
2019–2022 (S6)	Geelong	31 (21)
2022 (S7)–	Carlton	4 (1)
Total		49 (36)
- ^{1} Playing statistics correct to the end of 2022 season 7.

Career highlights
- AFLW: 2× Greater Western Sydney leading goalkicker: 2017, 2018; Geelong leading goalkicker: 2022 (S6); State: All Australian 2009; St Kilda Sharks team of the decade

Phoebe McWilliams (born 31 August 1985) is a former Australian rules footballer who played for Carlton in the AFL Women's competition.

She was signed as a priority player before the 2016 AFL Women's draft. She made her debut against Adelaide at Thebarton Oval in round one of the 2017 season. McWilliams played every match in her debut season to finish with seven games, and was Greater Western Sydney's top goal-kicker with seven goals.

Greater Western Sydney signed McWilliams for the 2018 season during the trade period in May 2017.

In May 2018, McWilliams accepted an offer from expansion club Geelong to play with the club in the 2019 season.

In June 2022, McWilliams was traded by Geelong to Carlton ahead of the seventh season of the AFL Women’s competition.

== Statistics ==
Statistics are correct to the end of 2022 season 6.

Season	Team	No.	Games	Totals							Averages (per game)							Votes
Season	Team	No.	Games	G	B	K	H	D	M	T	G	B	K	H	D	M	T	Votes
2017	Greater Western Sydney	3	7	7	1	25	17	42	13	9	1.0	0.1	3.6	2.4	6.0	1.9	1.3	0
2018	Greater Western Sydney	3	7	7	3	31	23	54	16	16	1.0	0.4	4.4	3.3	7.7	2.3	2.3	2
2019	Geelong	23	6	3	4	27	9	36	19	13	0.5	0.7	4.5	1.5	6.0	3.2	2.2	1
2020	Geelong	23	6	4	1	30	25	55	16	11	0.7	0.2	5.0	4.2	9.2	2.7	1.8	0
2021	Geelong	23	9	4	7	54	24	78	30	16	0.4	0.8	6.0	2.7	8.7	3.3	1.7	0
2022 (S6)	Geelong	23	10	10	3	39	21	60	23	18	1.0	0.3	3.9	2.1	6.0	2.3	1.8	
Career			45	35	19	206	119	325	117	83	0.8	0.4	4.6	2.6	7.2	2.6	1.8	

== Personal life ==
Prior to her AFLW career, McWilliams was communications co-ordinator for the Melbourne Cricket Club. To allow more time to concentrate on her football career, McWilliams became a freelance journalist.
