= La Salle College, Perth =

School in Perth, Western Australia

La Salle College
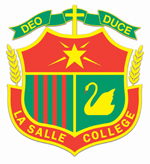

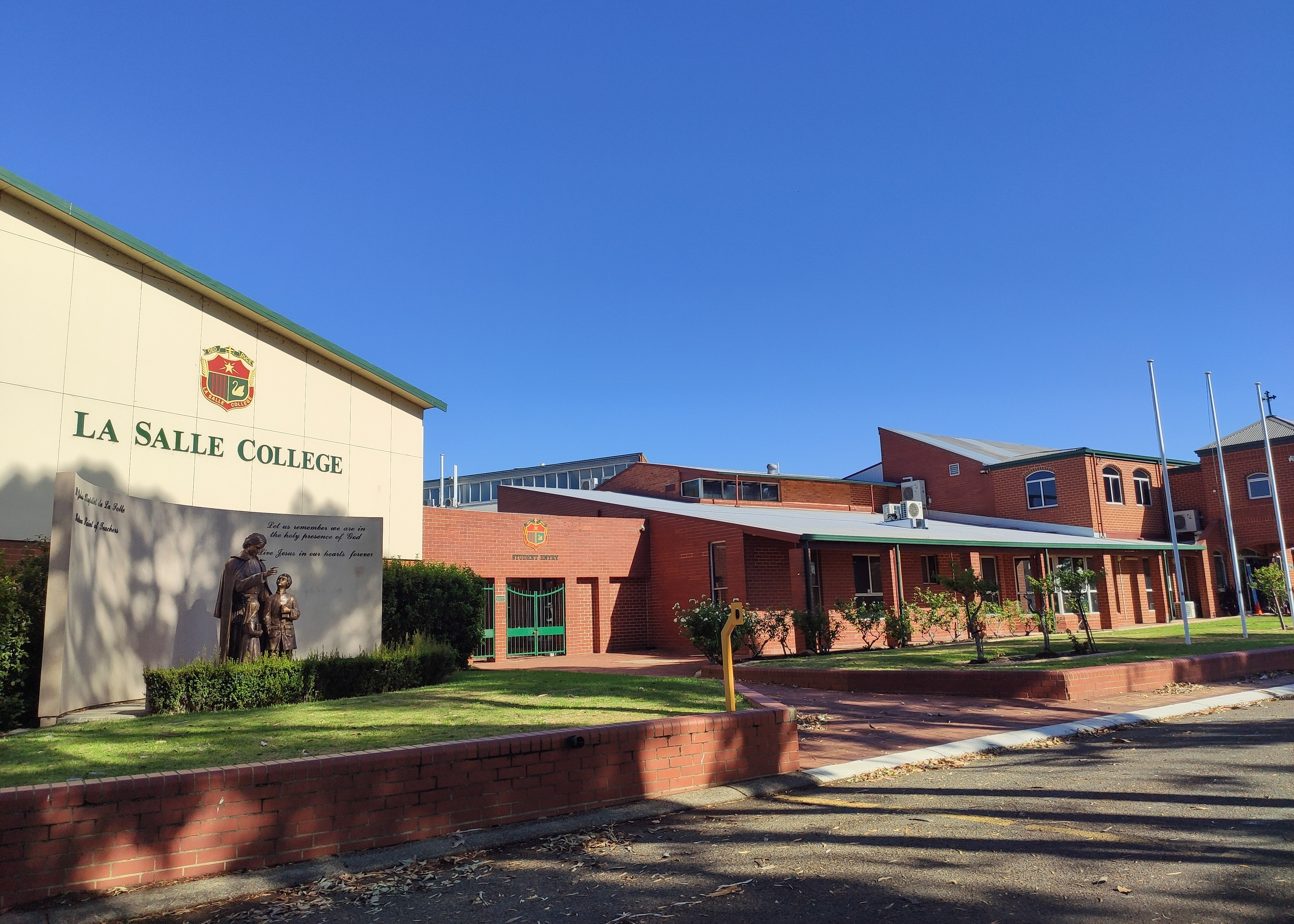

Location
- Middle Swan, WA; Australia; 31.8790°S 116.0046°E

Information
- Type: Catholic, co-educational
- Mottoes: Deo Duce, God our Leader; Transforming Tomorrow's Hearts, Minds, Lives
- Established: 1954
- Principal: Rox Davies
- Enrolment: 1400
- Colours: Green, red and yellow
- Website: lasalle.wa.edu.au

La Salle College is a Roman Catholic co-educational secondary school in Middle Swan, Western Australia, an eastern suburb of Perth. It caters for approximately 1400 Year 7–12 students, including about 40 Aboriginal boarding students from regional and remote Western Australia.

== History ==
In 1954, three De La Salle Brothers from the eastern Australian states opened De La Salle College with 61 male students.

Faced with declining vocations, the Brothers returned to the eastern states at the end of 1971. A College Board of Management was appointed by the Archbishop and Brother Fitzhardinge, a Christian Brother, was appointed headmaster. The name of the school was changed to La Salle College. In 1973 the girls from St Brigid’s Convent were relocated to the College resulting in La Salle becoming one of the first co-educational schools within Catholic education in WA.

== Famous Alumni ==
- Jessica Gomes, model
- Stephen Coniglio, professional Australian rules footballer
- William Vincent Bradley Nash, Model

== Facilities ==
La Salle College is made up of buildings that were constructed in the 1950s and the 21st century. Today the original buildings coexist with contemporary facilities. Facilities include:

- St John Baptist De La Salle Chapel
- Nicolas Barre Auditorium
- Br Fitzhardinge Trade Skills Centre
- Br Eric Pigott Performing Arts Centre
- Matthew Kennedy Aquatic Centre
- Jan Jolley iCentre
- Fr Lawrence Murphy Senior Learning Centre
- Patricia Rodrigues Centre
- Peter Elloy Staff Centre
- Michael Ciccarelli Lecture Theater
- Photographic and Art facilities
- Two large ovals and tennis, basketball and netball courts

== See also ==
- Jean-Baptiste de La Salle
- Institute of the Brothers of the Christian Schools
- Congregation of Christian Brothers
