= List of Greater Western Sydney Giants captains =

The following is a list of players who have captained the Greater Western Sydney Giants in the Australian Football League (AFL) and AFL Women's.

== AFL ==
Table of AFL captains
| Captain | Image | Season(s) | Achievements | Ref. |
|---|---|---|---|---|
| Phil Davis | | 2012–2019 (co-captain) | First Grand Final captain 2019 | |
| Luke Power | | 2012 (co-captain) | | |
| Callan Ward | | 2012–2019 (co-captain) | | |
| Stephen Coniglio | | 2020–2021 (sole captain), 2022 (co-captain) | | |
| Josh Kelly | | 2022 (co-captain) | | |
| Toby Greene | | 2022 (co-captain), 2023–2026 (sole captain) | | |

== AFL Women's ==
Table of AFL Women's captains
| Captain | Image | Season(s) | Achievements | Ref. |
|---|---|---|---|---|
| Amanda Farrugia | | 2017–2019 | | |
| Alicia Eva | | 2020–2023 | | |
| Rebecca Beeson | | 2024– | | |
