= Paul Ahern =

Australian rules footballer

Personal information
- Full name: Paul Ahern
- Born: 1 August 1996 (age 30)
- Original team: Calder Cannons (TAC Cup)
- Draft: No. 7, 2014 national draft
- Debut: Round 11, 2018, North Melbourne vs. Brisbane Lions, at Docklands Stadium
- Height: 183 cm (6 ft 0 in)
- Weight: 85 kg (187 lb)
- Position: Midfielder

Club information
- Current club: North Melbourne
- Number: 15

Playing career^{1}
| Years | Club | Games (Goals) |
| 2015–2017 | Greater Western Sydney | 0 (0) |
| 2018–2020 | North Melbourne | 22 (6) |
- ^{1} Playing statistics correct to the end of 2020.

Paul Ahern (born 1 August 1996) is a former professional Australian rules footballer who played for the Greater Western Sydney Giants and the North Melbourne Football Club in the Australian Football League (AFL). He was originally drafted by the Greater Western Sydney Giants with their third selection and seventh overall in the 2014 national draft. After failing to play a senior match in his two seasons with the Giants due to a number of injuries including two knee reconstructions, he was traded to North Melbourne during the 2016 trade period. He made his debut in the fifty-four point win against Brisbane in round eleven of the 2018 season, one year after being traded to North Melbourne. Ahern was delisted by North Melbourne at the end of the 2020 AFL season after a mass delisting by North Melbourne which saw 11 players cut from the team's list.

As of May 2024, Ahern is playing for Pascoe Vale in the EDFL (Essendon District Football League)
