= Leon Cameron =

Australian rules footballer, born 1972

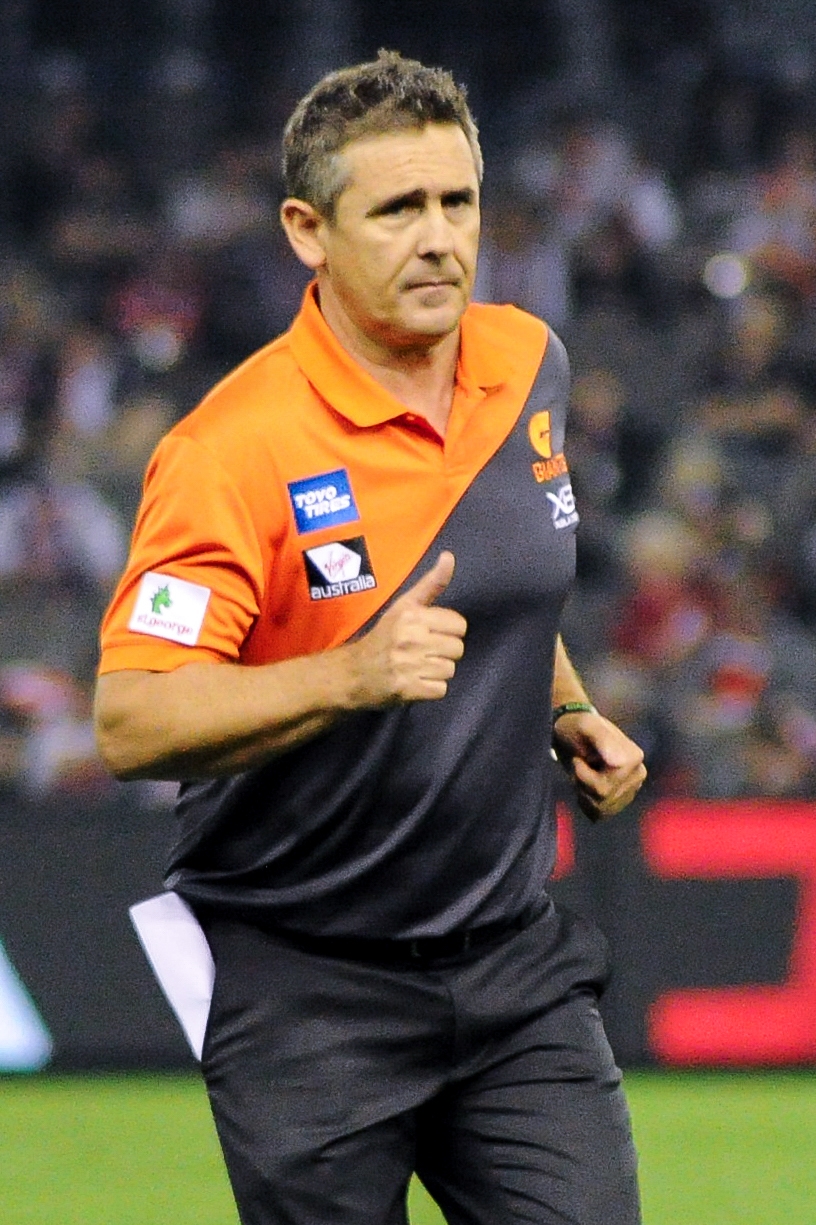
- Cameron in April 2018

Personal information
- Full name: Leon Cameron
- Born: 2 September 1972 (age 54)
- Original team: South Warrnambool Football Club
- Draft: No. 7, 1988 national draft
- Height: 185 cm (6 ft 1 in)
- Weight: 82 kg (181 lb)
- Position: Wing/Defender

Playing career^{1}
Years	Club	Games (Goals)
1990–1999	Footscray/Western Bulldogs	172 (68)
2000–2003	Richmond	84 (40)
Total		256 (108)

Coaching career^{3}
Years	Club	Games (W–L–D)
2014–2022	Greater Western Sydney	193 (101–88–4)
- ^{1} Playing statistics correct to the end of 2003.^{3} Coaching statistics correct as of Round 9, 2022.

Career highlights
- Charles Sutton Medal 1993

Leon Cameron (born 2 September 1972) is a former Australian rules footballer who is the former senior coach of the Greater Western Sydney Giants (GWS) in the Australian Football League (AFL). His AFL playing career lasted from 1990 to 2003 and included 256 senior games – 172 for the Western Bulldogs and 84 for Richmond.

== AFL playing career ==
=== Footscray/Western Bulldogs ===
Cameron was recruited from South Warrnambool Football Club with the 7th selection in the 1988 National draft for the Footscray Football Club (Bulldogs). He played 172 games and kicked 68 goals for the Bulldogs between 1990 and 1999 and won the Charles Sutton Medal in 1993 and The Age Footballer of the Year award in 1995.

=== Richmond ===
In 2000, Cameron was traded to the Richmond Football Club where he played a further 84 games and kicked 40 goals over four seasons before retiring at the end of the 2003 AFL season.

== AFL coaching career ==
=== Assistant coaching roles ===
After retirement Cameron returned to the Western Bulldogs as an assistant coach from 2004 to the end of 2010. In September 2010 he accepted an assistant coaching role with Hawthorn, playing an instrumental role in the club as they reached the 2012 AFL Grand Final, which was lost to the Sydney Swans. It was Cameron's first Grand Final as an AFL player or coach after three preliminary final losses as a player (two at the Western Bulldogs and one at Richmond) and another four as an assistant coach (three at the Bulldogs and one at Hawthorn).

Cameron then joined Greater Western Sydney as the senior assistant coach for the 2013 season with a contract that appointed him as the senior coach from 2014.

=== First senior coaching role ===
==== Greater Western Sydney ====
On 1 September 2013, after Kevin Sheedy coached his 679th and final game as a senior coach in the VFL-AFL, the competing teams formed a guard of honour for Sheedy and a handover ceremony took place with Sheedy passing the baton to Leon Cameron who succeeded him as senior coach. Cameron's contract, signed in October 2012, stipulated one year as assistant coach under senior coach Sheedy and then 3 years as the senior coach.

Cameron's tenure saw the Giants reach five out of a possible six finals series between 2016 and 2021, the most memorable among those being the Giants' narrow preliminary final loss to eventual premiers the Western Bulldogs, as well as Greater Western Sydney's inaugural grand final appearance in 2019, where they were defeated by Richmond by 89 points.

Despite the Giants making the 2021 AFL finals series, Cameron resigned as senior coach of GWS Giants on 12 May 2022 after eight years in the senior coaching role. This followed a string of poor on-field results for the Giants, and saw Cameron replaced by assistant coach Mark McVeigh as GWS caretaker senior coach for the rest of the 2022 season, following a farewell game against Carlton in Round 9, 2022. In the match, GWS lost by a margin of 30 points, and Cameron left the field through a guard of honour from both sides.

=== Post coaching career ===
In September 2022, Cameron joined the Sydney Swans as coaching director of their Academy, before being promoted to Executive General Manager of Football in November 2023.

== Statistics ==
=== Playing statistics ===
Legend
G	Goals	K	Kicks	D	Disposals	T	Tackles
B	Behinds	H	Handballs	M	Marks

Season	Team	No.	Games	Totals							Averages (per game)							Votes
Season	Team	No.	Games	G	B	K	H	D	M	T	G	B	K	H	D	M	T	Votes
1990	Footscray	18	20	8	10	258	129	387	74	13	0.4	0.5	12.9	6.5	19.4	3.7	0.7	10
1991	Footscray	18	19	10	11	241	79	320	57	10	0.5	0.6	12.7	4.2	16.8	3.0	0.5	2
1992	Footscray	18	3	0	0	22	7	29	1	0	0.0	0.0	7.3	2.3	9.7	0.3	0.0	0
1993	Footscray	18	19	8	11	314	123	437	59	24	0.4	0.6	16.5	6.5	23.0	3.1	1.3	14
1994	Footscray	18	24	13	24	328	136	464	97	25	0.5	1.0	13.7	5.7	19.3	4.0	1.0	13
1995	Footscray	18	23	7	19	336	135	471	85	24	0.3	0.8	14.6	5.9	20.5	3.7	1.0	7
1996	Footscray	18	8	3	1	74	28	102	22	9	0.4	0.1	9.3	3.5	12.8	2.8	1.1	0
1997	Western Bulldogs	18	17	6	10	207	59	266	62	7	0.4	0.6	12.2	3.5	15.6	3.6	0.4	3
1998	Western Bulldogs	18	22	6	5	276	90	366	80	19	0.3	0.2	12.5	4.1	16.6	3.6	0.9	0
1999	Western Bulldogs	18	17	7	11	164	63	227	57	6	0.4	0.6	9.6	3.7	13.4	3.4	0.4	2
2000	Richmond	15	19	3	3	257	79	336	73	19	0.2	0.2	13.5	4.2	17.7	3.8	1.0	3
2001	Richmond	15	25	19	6	344	139	483	111	33	0.8	0.2	13.8	5.6	19.3	4.4	1.3	11
2002	Richmond	15	19	2	10	184	91	275	59	23	0.1	0.5	9.7	4.8	14.5	3.1	1.2	2
2003	Richmond	15	21	16	4	175	57	232	90	15	0.8	0.2	8.3	2.7	11.0	4.3	0.7	1
Career			256	108	125	3180	1215	4395	927	227	0.4	0.5	12.4	4.7	17.2	3.6	0.9	68

=== Coaching statistics ===
Statistics are correct to the end of 2024.

Team	Year	Home and Away Season					Finals			
Team	Year	Won	Lost	Drew	Win %	Position	Won	Lost	Win %	Result
GWS	2014	6	16	0	.273	16th out of 18	–	–	–	–
GWS	2015	11	11	0	.500	11th out of 18	–	–	–	–
GWS	2016	16	6	0	.727	4th out of 18	1	1	.500	Lost to Western Bulldogs in Preliminary Final
GWS	2017	14	6	2	.682	4th out of 18	1	2	.334	Lost to Richmond in Preliminary Final
GWS	2018	13	8	1	.614	7th out of 18	1	1	.500	Lost to Collingwood in Semi Final
GWS	2019	13	9	0	.591	6th out of 18	3	1	.750	Lost to Richmond in Grand Final
GWS	2020	8	9	0	.471	10th out of 18	–	–	–	–
GWS	2021	11	10	1	.523	7th out of 18	1	1	.500	Lost to Geelong in Semi Final
GWS	2022	2	7	0	.222	(Resigned after R9) (Note: Cameron stood down as coach of GWS at the conclusion of round 9, 2022. At this point in the season, GWS were 15th on the ladder with two wins and seven losses.)	–	–	–	–
Total		94	82	4	.533		7	6	.539	
