= Josh Kelly (Australian footballer) =

Australian rules footballer (born 1995)

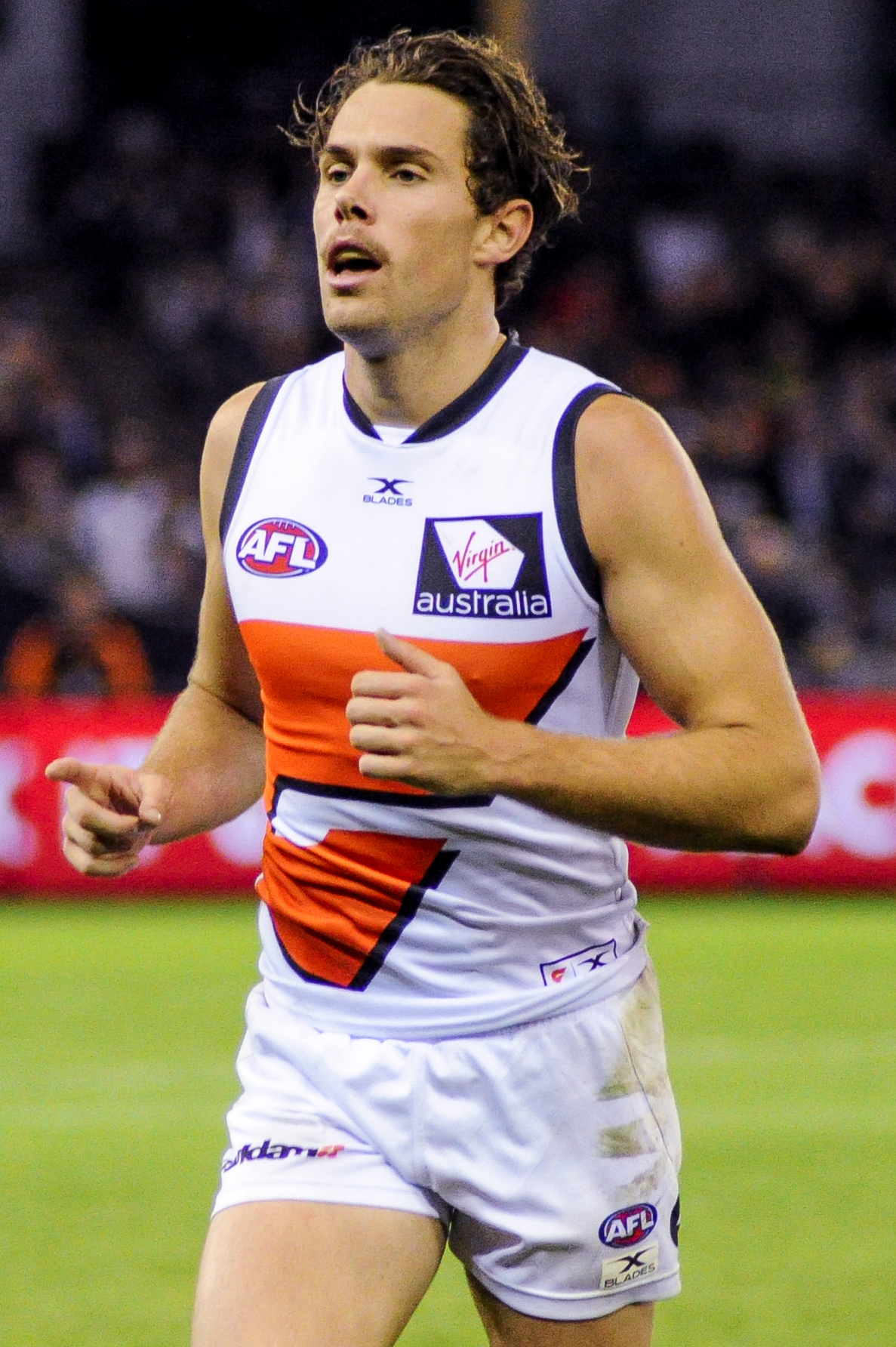
- Kelly playing for Greater Western Sydney in June 2017

Personal information
- Full name: Joshua Kelly
- Nickname: Chook
- Born: 12 February 1995 (age 31)
- Original team: Sandringham Dragons (TAC Cup)/Brighton Grammar
- Draft: No. 2, 2013 national draft
- Height: 184 cm (6 ft 0 in)
- Weight: 83 kg (183 lb)
- Position: Midfielder

Club information
- Current club: Greater Western Sydney
- Number: 22

Playing career^{1}
Years	Club	Games (Goals)
2014–	Greater Western Sydney	230 (144)

Representative team honours
Years	Team	Games (Goals)
2020	Victoria	1 (4)
- ^{1} Playing statistics correct to the end of the 2025 season.

Career highlights
- Greater Western Sydney captain: 2022; All-Australian team: 2017; 2x Kevin Sheedy Medal: 2017, 2021; 22under22 team: 2017; AFL Rising Star nominee: 2014

Joshua Kelly (born 12 February 1995) is a professional Australian rules footballer playing for the Greater Western Sydney Giants in the Australian Football League (AFL). He was recruited by the Greater Western Sydney Giants with the second overall selection in the 2013 national draft.

Kelly had a breakout year in 2017, winning inclusion in the All-Australian team and finishing fifth in the Brownlow Medal. He was named in the Greater Western Sydney Giants leadership group in 2018 where he remains as Vice-Captain. Josh Kelly began his football career as an Auskicker at East Brighton in Melbourne's south-east before being drafted at pick two in the 2013 NAB AFL Draft. Kelly is the son of Phil Kelly, who played 61 games as a wingman for North Melbourne in the 1980s and won two Sandover Medals in the WAFL. He won the GIANTS Rising Star Award in his first season and become a mainstay of the Giants' midfield in just a few short years. Kelly was elevated into the club's official leadership group ahead of the 2017 season in just his fourth year in the AFL, and after a stunning 2017 season was named vice-captain in 2018.

In December 2021, Kelly was named, along with Toby Greene and incumbent Stephen Coniglio, as co-captain of the club. In February 2023, Kelly and Coniglio were named vice-captains as Greene was named the sole captain.

== AFL career ==
He is the son of Phil Kelly, who played 109 games and won multiple Sandover Medals for East Perth in the West Australian Football League and then moved to the Victorian Football League, playing 61 games for the Kangaroos from 1981-85. He also has a younger sister, Laine Kelly. During the AFL combine he showed elite endurance, finishing the 3 km time trial with a time of 9 minutes and 32 seconds (the second fastest ever in testing). He was educated at Brighton Grammar School, alongside fellow 2013 draftees Christian Salem and Jayden Hunt.

He was nominated for the 2014 AFL Rising Star award after featuring in Greater Western Sydney's 32-point win over Melbourne in round 3.

Kelly had a stellar 2017 season, being named in the All-Australian team and finishing fifth in the Brownlow Medal. In the opening rounds of the season, it was confirmed that North Melbourne had made a $9 million contract offer. He eventually re-signed with the Giants at the end of the year on a 2-year contract; the amount was not disclosed.

Kelly was a key member of the Giants‘ 2019 finals campaign which saw the team reach its first grand final. He managed 27 disposals and was named in the best players in the team’s four point preliminary final win against Collingwood.

== Statistics ==
Updated to the end of the 2025 season.

Legend
G	Goals	K	Kicks	D	Disposals	T	Tackles
B	Behinds	H	Handballs	M	Marks

Season	Team	No.	Games	Totals							Averages (per game)							Votes
Season	Team	No.	Games	G	B	K	H	D	M	T	G	B	K	H	D	M	T	Votes
2014	Greater Western Sydney	22	18	13	7	168	144	312	55	58	0.7	0.4	9.3	8.0	17.3	3.1	3.2	0
2015	Greater Western Sydney	22	18	7	12	172	150	322	70	66	0.4	0.7	9.6	8.3	17.9	3.9	3.7	0
2016	Greater Western Sydney	22	24	14	16	301	265	566	90	94	0.6	0.7	12.5	11.0	23.6	3.8	3.9	6
2017	Greater Western Sydney	22	24	19	24	338	370	708	85	156	0.8	1.0	14.1	15.4	29.5	3.5	6.5	21
2018	Greater Western Sydney	22	16	10	13	253	168	421	58	82	0.6	0.8	15.8	10.5	26.3	3.6	5.1	10
2019	Greater Western Sydney	22	18	14	11	287	220	507	69	97	0.8	0.6	15.9	12.2	28.2	3.8	5.4	11
2020 (Note: The 2020 season was played with 17 home-and-away matches per team (down from 22) and 16-minute quarters with time on (down from 20-minute quarters with time on) due to the impact of the COVID-19 pandemic.)	Greater Western Sydney	22	14	5	8	177	132	309	42	58	0.4	0.6	12.6	9.4	22.1	3.0	4.1	8
2021	Greater Western Sydney	22	23	16	15	333	268	601	82	129	0.7	0.7	14.5	11.7	26.1	3.6	5.6	11
2022	Greater Western Sydney	22	21	9	9	295	265	560	93	101	0.4	0.4	14.0	12.6	26.7	4.4	4.8	13
2023	Greater Western Sydney	22	22	16	8	286	306	592	64	97	0.7	0.4	13.0	13.9	26.9	2.9	4.4	8
2024	Greater Western Sydney	22	17	16	6	221	192	413	71	62	0.9	0.4	13.0	11.3	24.3	4.2	3.6	6
2025	Greater Western Sydney	22	15	5	5	147	175	322	52	60	0.3	0.3	9.8	11.7	21.5	3.5	4.0	3
Career			230	144	134	2978	2655	5633	831	1060	0.6	0.6	12.9	11.5	24.5	3.6	4.6	97
