= Toby Greene =

Australian rules footballer (born 1993)

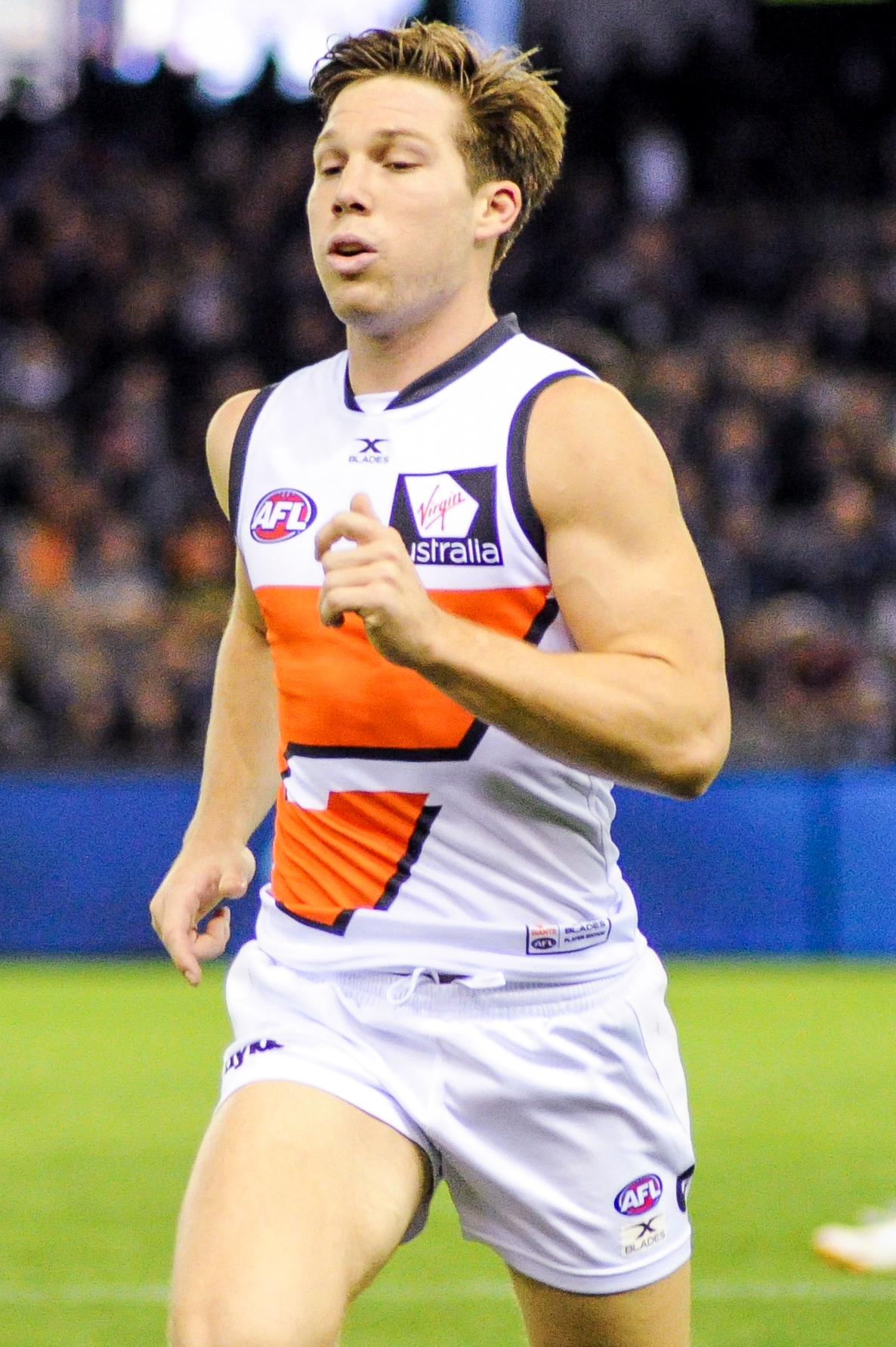
- Greene in June 2017

Personal information
- Full name: Toby Greene
- Born: 25 September 1993 (age 33); Melbourne
- Original team: Oakleigh Chargers (TAC Cup)/Ashburton Redbacks(YJFL)/Wesley College (APS)
- Draft: No. 11, 2011 national draft: Greater Western Sydney
- Debut: Round 1, 2012, Greater Western Sydney vs. Sydney, at Stadium Australia
- Height: 182 cm (6 ft 0 in)
- Weight: 83 kg (183 lb)
- Position: Forward

Club information
- Current club: Geelong
- Number: 1

Playing career^{1}
Years	Club	Games (Goals)
2012-2026	Greater Western Sydney	282 (450)
2027–	Geelong	0 (0)
Total		282 (450)

Representative team honours^{2}
Years	Team	Games (Goals)
2020–	Victoria	2 (6)
- ^{1} Playing statistics correct to the end of 2026.^{2} Representative statistics correct as of 2026.

Career highlights
- Greater Western Sydney captain: 2022–2026; 3× All-Australian team: 2016, 2021, 2023 (c); 2× Kevin Sheedy Medal: 2016, 2023; 4× GWS leading goalkicker: 2017, 2021, 2022, 2023; Brett Kirk Medal: 2023 round 3; AFL Rising Star nominee: 2012; Greater Western Sydney inaugural team 2012

Toby Greene (born 25 September 1993) is a professional Australian rules footballer who plays for the Geelong Cats in the Australian Football League (AFL). He was recruited by the Greater Western Sydney Giants in the 2011 AFL draft and made his debut in the club's inaugural AFL season in 2012. In 2026, Greene announced that he would move to Victoria to play for the Geelong Cats in the following 2027 season.

Originally recruited as a midfielder, Greene developed into one of the competition's most prolific forwards. He has played the most games in Greater Western Sydney history and is second in total goals scored by a Giants player, behind Jeremy Cameron.

Greene is a three-time All-Australian, earning selections in 2016, 2021 and 2023, and was named captain of the All-Australian team in 2023. He has also won the Kevin Sheedy Medal, the Giants' best and fairest award, twice, in 2016 and 2023.

Greene's career has been marked by a number of disciplinary incidents, resulting in suspensions and fines, contributing to a reputation as a highly competitive but controversial player.

== AFL career ==
Greene grew up in Ashburton and attended Wesley College in Glen Waverley. He was recruited by Greater Western Sydney with the 11th overall selection in the 2011 national draft. He played junior football for Ashburton Redbacks alongside future AFL stars Tom Mitchell and Jack Viney.

Greene played in the Greater Western Sydney's first season in 2012, debuting in round one against Sydney. A prolific ball-winner, he won the Giants' best first year player award in 2012 and was the runner-up in the Kevin Sheedy Medal as the club's best and fairest. He was nominated for the AFL Rising Star in 2012 award but was ineligible to win it due to being found guilty for a bumping offence earlier in the season.

In 2017, Greene won the Giants' leading goalkicker award with 45 goals for the season. He came equal first with teammates Jonathan Patton and Jeremy Cameron.

On 17 September 2019, Greene had his one-match suspension upheld by the AFL Tribunal for making contact with the eyes of Lachie Neale, making Greene unavailable for Greater Western Sydney's Preliminary Final match against Collingwood.

Greene was able to continue with good form in the 2020 AFL season and enhanced his reputation as a match-winner. Greene was critical in the Giants' wins over eventual grand finalists Geelong and Richmond with four- and five-goal hauls, respectively, in victories. The dynamic forward missed four games due to knee and hamstring issues, but he still polled 12 Brownlow Medal votes—comfortably the most at the club.

In the 2022 AFL season, Greene came back from his suspension with 37 goals for the season, with a season-high tally of seven goals in Round 14 against the Western Bulldogs. On 30 August 2023, Greene was selected as the captain in the 2023 All-Australian team.

Towards the end of the 2026 season, Greene announced that he would move to Victoria in order to play for the Geelong Cats, the Giants also said that he would move for family reasons.

Greene's move to the Geelong Cats as an unrestricted free agent was confirmed in October 2026.

== Discipline ==
During Greene's playing career, he has received a total of 22 AFL Tribunal charges or match review panel citations, six suspensions, and nearly $30,000 in fines. Greene stated in 2017 that he has been unable to contain his rage in certain situations, gaining a reputation for being one of the dirtiest players in the AFL.

During a one-point victory in the second elimination final of 2021, Greene was reported for making intentional contact with umpire Matt Stevic and was subsequently suspended for three weeks. With the Giants deciding not to appeal the suspension, Greene was out of the remainder of the 2021 AFL finals series. Nevertheless, former umpire Shane McInerney—who retired in 2019 after umpiring a record 500 games, including 26 finals—believes Greene was "lucky" to get away with a three-match suspension. On 1 September 2021, AFL CEO Gillon McLachlan said he was considering appealing Greene's three-match ban in an attempt to suspend Greene for more matches, saying he found the tribunal decision "perplexing". On 7 October 2021, the AFL Appeals Board increased the penalty to a six-game suspension.

== Assault charge ==
On 13 May 2014, Greene was charged with a number of offences, including assault with a dangerous weapon and intentionally causing serious injury, over an alleged assault at a Melbourne licensed venue the previous night. He faced court on 9 December 2014 on a charge of unlawful assault and was fined $2,500 but escaped conviction.

== Statistics ==
Updated to the end of the 2026 season.

Legend
G	Goals	K	Kicks	D	Disposals	T	Tackles
B	Behinds	H	Handballs	M	Marks
†	Led the league for the season

Season	Team	No.	Games	Totals							Averages (per game)							Votes
Season	Team	No.	Games	G	B	K	H	D	M	T	G	B	K	H	D	M	T	Votes
2012	Greater Western Sydney	35	19	8	10	273	266	539	73	63	0.4	0.5	14.4	14.0	28.4	3.8	3.3	4
2013	Greater Western Sydney	4	19	4	5	226	208	434	69	42	0.2	0.3	11.9	10.9	22.8	3.6	2.2	0
2014	Greater Western Sydney	4	15	7	2	197	225	422	81	62	0.5	0.1	13.1	15.0	28.1	5.4	4.1	3
2015	Greater Western Sydney	4	22	15	12	239	263	502	107	69	0.7	0.5	10.9	12.0	22.8	4.9	3.1	3
2016	Greater Western Sydney	4	23	44	27	285	204	489	112	84	1.9	1.2	12.4	8.9	21.3	4.9	3.7	6
2017	Greater Western Sydney	4	19	45	28	227	119	346	110	53	2.4	1.5	11.9	6.3	18.2	5.8	2.8	8
2018	Greater Western Sydney	4	9	16	10	96	46	142	42	8	1.8	1.1	10.7	5.1	15.8	4.7	0.9	1
2019	Greater Western Sydney	4	19	27	14	283	161	444	104	64	1.4	0.7	14.9	8.5	23.4	5.5	3.4	6
2020 (Note: The 2020 season was played with 17 home-and-away matches per team (down from 22) and 16-minute quarters with time on (down from 20-minute quarters with time on) due to the impact of the COVID-19 pandemic.)	Greater Western Sydney	4	13	17	11	122	84	206	52	19	1.3	0.8	9.4	6.5	15.8	4.0	1.5	12
2021	Greater Western Sydney	4	18	45	41^{†}	232	77	309	78	39	2.5	2.3^{†}	12.9	4.3	17.2	4.3	2.2	6
2022	Greater Western Sydney	4	15	37	19	160	55	215	78	22	2.5	1.3	10.7	3.7	14.3	5.2	1.5	3
2023	Greater Western Sydney	4	24	66	35	289	137	426	106	60	2.8	1.5	12.0	5.7	17.8	4.4	2.5	20
2024	Greater Western Sydney	4	24	44	33	257	109	366	101	58	1.8	1.4	10.7	4.5	15.3	4.2	2.4	10
2025	Greater Western Sydney	4	22	41	31	254	108	362	101	71	1.9	1.4	11.5	4.9	16.5	4.6	3.2	14
2026	Greater Western Sydney	4	21	34	28	298	133	431	79	62	1.6	1.3	14.2	6.3	20.5	3.8	3.0	10
Career			282	450	306	3436	2195	5631	1293	776	1.6	1.1	12.2	7.8	20.0	4.6	2.7	106

== Honours and achievements ==
- All-Australian team: 2016, 2021, 2023 (c)
- AFL Rising Star nominee: 2012
- Kevin Sheedy Medal: 2016, 2023
- GWS leading goalkicker: 2017, 2021, 2022, 2023
- Greater Western Sydney Giants inaugural team
- Greater Western Sydney Giants Rising Star: 2012
- Greater Western Sydney Giants Members Choice Award: 2012
- Greater Western Sydney Giants Leading Disposal Getter: 2012
- Greater Western Sydney Giants Mark of the Year: 2017
- Greater Western Sydney Giants Life Member
