= Matthew Buntine =

Australian rules footballer

Personal information
- Full name: Matthew Buntine
- Born: 19 October 1993 (age 33)
- Original team: Dandenong Stingrays (TAC Cup)
- Draft: No. 5, 2011 national draft
- Height: 189 cm (6 ft 2 in)
- Weight: 85 kg (187 lb)
- Position: Defender

Playing career^{1}
Years	Club	Games (Goals)
2012–2021	Greater Western Sydney	67 (4)
- ^{1} Playing statistics correct to the end of Round 23, 2021.

Career highlights
- VFL premiership player: 2022

Matthew Buntine (born 19 October 1993) is a professional Australian rules footballer who last played for the Greater Western Sydney Giants in the Australian Football League (AFL). He was drafted with pick five in the 2011 national draft. Buntine made his debut in round 8, 2012, against the Brisbane Lions at the Gabba. He was delisted in 2021.
