= Phil Davis (Australian footballer) =

Australian rules footballer

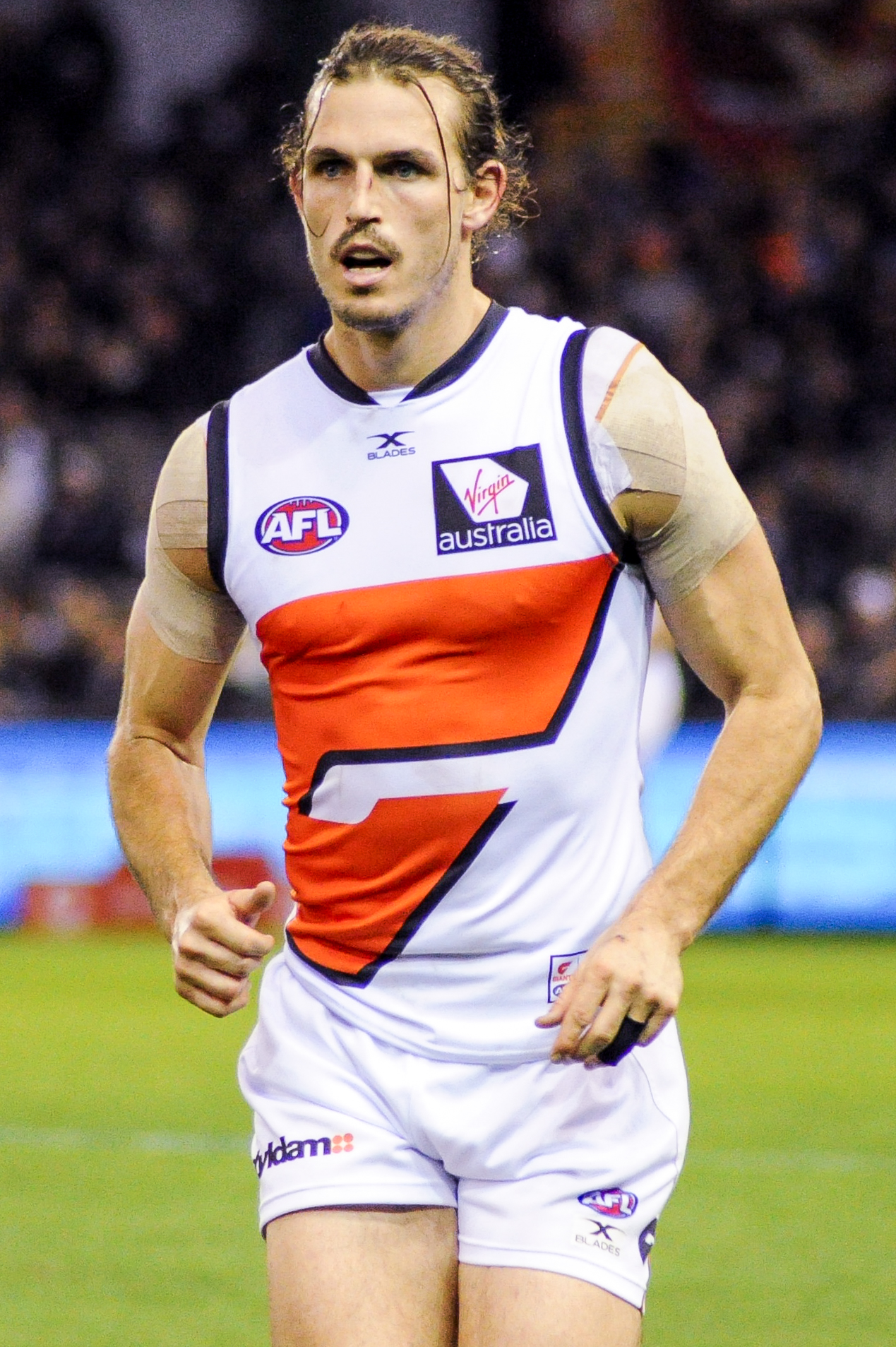
- Davis playing in June 2017.

Personal information
- Full name: Philip James Davis
- Born: 30 August 1990 (age 36); Canberra, Australian Capital Territory
- Original team: North Adelaide (SANFL)
- Draft: No. 10, 2008 national draft
- Height: 197 cm (6 ft 6 in)
- Weight: 96 kg (212 lb)
- Position: Defender

Playing career^{1}
Years	Club	Games (Goals)
2009–2011	Adelaide	18 (1)
2012–2023	Greater Western Sydney	174 (6)
Total		192 (7)
- ^{1} Playing statistics correct to the end of 2023.

Career highlights
- Greater Western Sydney co-captain: 2012–2019; 22 Under 22 team: 2012; AFL Rising Star nominee: 2010; Greater Western Sydney Giants Life Member

Philip James Davis (born 30 August 1990) is a former professional Australian rules footballer who played for the Greater Western Sydney Giants in the Australian Football League (AFL).

== Early life ==
Davis was born in Canberra, Australian Capital Territory, and lived there until the age of 14 when he relocated with his family to Adelaide. He attended school at Marist College Canberra and then St Peter's College, Adelaide. He was drafted by the Adelaide Crows with the tenth selection in the 2008 AFL draft.

== AFL career ==
Davis missed the end of the 2008 and the beginning of the 2009 seasons due to a shoulder injury. He played for North Adelaide in the South Australian National Football League (SANFL) and was close to selection by Adelaide towards the end of the 2009 season, being named as an emergency numerous times.

Davis made his AFL debut for Adelaide in Round 4, 2010 against Carlton at AAMI Stadium; he had 16 possessions and seven marks. Davis was nominated for the 2010 Rising Star in round 16 for his performance against Cameron Mooney.

In August 2011, Davis became the first player to announce that he would be moving to the new Greater Western Sydney club in 2012. This led Adelaide football manager Phil Harper to say the club was "bloody disappointed" to lose such a young player who was taken with a high draft pick in the 2008 AFL draft.

On 14 February 2012, Davis was named as one of three inaugural Co-Captains of the GWS Giants, alongside former Brisbane Lions veteran Luke Power and Western Bulldogs import Callan Ward.

On 21 August 2023, Davis announced his immediate retirement from the AFL, having played just five games since the start of the 2022 season and none in 2023.

== Statistics ==
Statistics are correct to the end of 2023

Legend
G	Goals	K	Kicks	D	Disposals	T	Tackles
B	Behinds	H	Handballs	M	Marks

Season	Team	No.	Games	Totals							Averages (per game)							Votes
Season	Team	No.	Games	G	B	K	H	D	M	T	G	B	K	H	D	M	T	Votes
2009	Adelaide	16	0	—	—	—	—	—	—	—	—	—	—	—	—	—	—	0
2010	Adelaide	16	15	1	0	100	89	189	70	21	0.1	0.0	6.7	5.9	12.6	4.7	1.4	0
2011	Adelaide	16	3	0	0	21	13	34	21	4	0.0	0.0	7.0	4.3	11.3	4.0	1.3	0
2012	Greater Western Sydney	1	22	5	1	209	119	328	122	42	0.2	0.1	9.5	5.4	14.9	5.6	1.9	0
2013	Greater Western Sydney	1	13	0	2	105	62	167	71	20	0.0	0.2	8.1	4.8	12.9	5.5	1.5	0
2014	Greater Western Sydney	1	11	0	0	81	52	133	55	18	0.0	0.0	7.4	4.7	12.1	5.0	1.6	0
2015	Greater Western Sydney	1	12	0	0	81	62	143	59	14	0.0	0.0	6.8	5.2	11.9	4.9	1.2	0
2016	Greater Western Sydney	1	21	0	1	151	97	248	95	37	0.0	0.1	7.2	4.6	11.8	4.5	1.8	1
2017	Greater Western Sydney	1	24	0	1	160	145	305	108	56	0.0	0.0	6.7	6.0	12.7	4.5	2.3	0
2018	Greater Western Sydney	1	22	0	1	181	153	334	128	38	0.0	0.5	8.2	7.0	15.2	5.8	1.7	0
2019	Greater Western Sydney	1	23	1	1	196	120	316	162	42	0.0	0.0	8.5	5.2	13.7	7.0	1.8	3
2020 (Note: The 2020 season was played with 17 home-and-away matches per team (down from 22) and 16-minute quarters with time on (down from 20-minute quarters with time on) due to the impact of the COVID-19 pandemic.)	Greater Western Sydney	1	10	0	0	42	42	84	37	12	0.0	0.0	4.2	4.2	8.4	3.7	1.2	0
2021	Greater Western Sydney	1	11	0	0	64	47	111	47	16	0.0	0.0	5.8	4.3	10.1	4.3	1.4	0
2022	Greater Western Sydney	1	5	0	0	36	22	58	23	8	0.0	0.0	7.2	4.4	11.6	4.6	1.6	0
2023	Greater Western Sydney	1	0	—	—	—	—	—	—	—	—	—	—	—	—	—	—	0
Career			192	7	7	1427	1023	2450	989	328	0.0	0.0	7.4	5.3	12.8	5.1	1.7	4
