= Mark McVeigh =

Australian rules footballer, born 1981

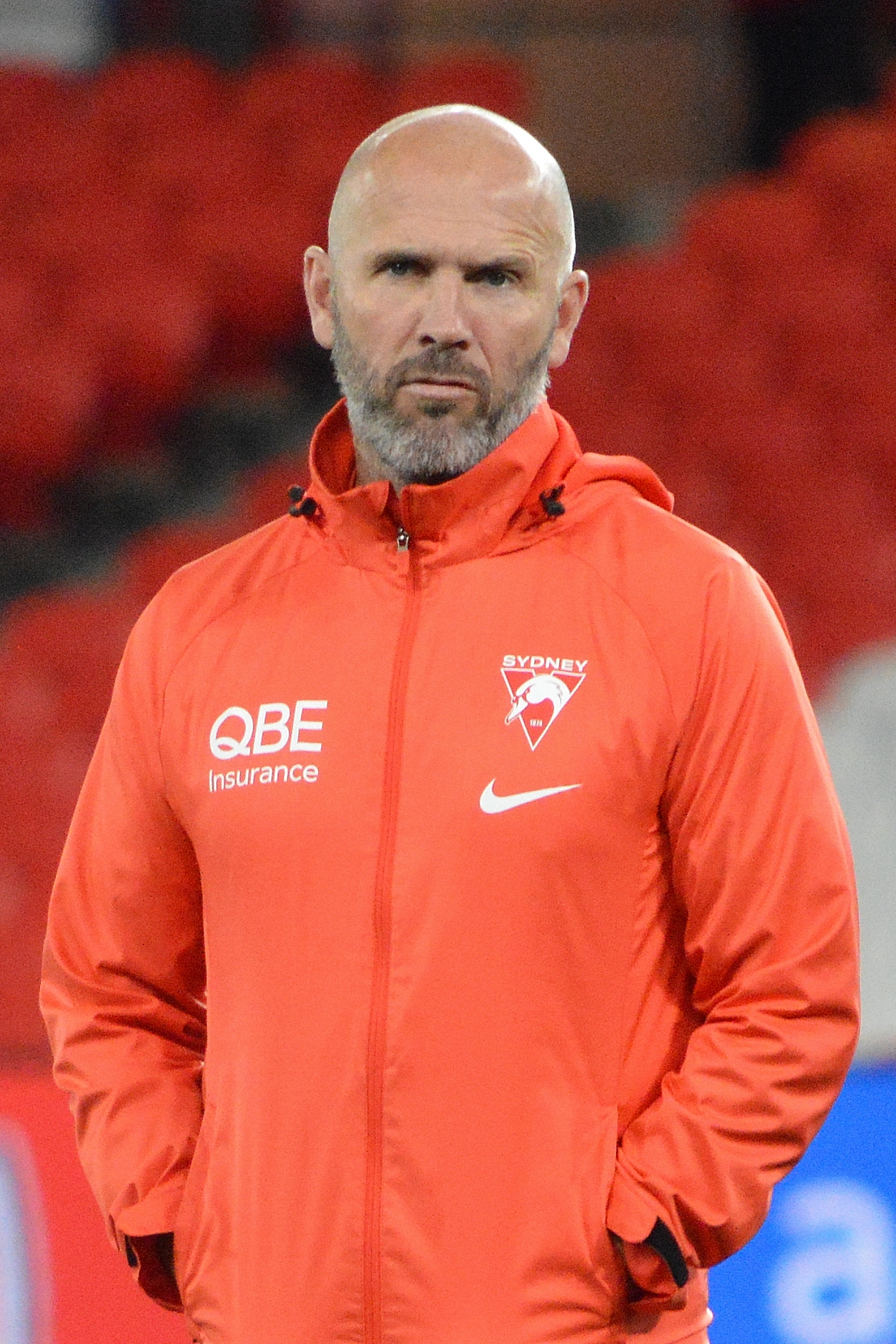
- McVeigh in August 2026

Personal information
- Full name: Mark McVeigh
- Nickname: Spike
- Born: 26 January 1981 (age 45); Melbourne
- Original teams: Killarney Vale Bombers, Pennant Hills Demons; NSW/ACT Rams (TAC Cup)
- Draft: No. 9, 1998 National draft, Essendon
- Height: 184 cm (6 ft 0 in)
- Weight: 85 kg (187 lb)
- Position: Utility

Playing career^{1}
Years	Club	Games (Goals)
1999–2012	Essendon	232 (107)

International team honours
Years	Team	Games (Goals)
2004	Australia	2 (0)

Coaching career^{3}
Years	Club	Games (W–L–D)
2022	Greater Western Sydney (caretaker)	13 (4–9–0)
2027–	Essendon	
- ^{1} Playing statistics correct to the end of 2012.^{3} Coaching statistics correct as of round 14, 2022.

Career highlights
- Archer–Hird Medal 2008; 2001 AFL Rising Star nominee

Mark McVeigh (born 26 January 1981) is a former professional Australian rules footballer who played for and is currently the senior coach of the Essendon Football Club in the Australian Football League (AFL). He served as the caretaker senior coach of the Greater Western Sydney Giants following the resignation of Leon Cameron in 2022. He has been the senior coach of the Essendon Football Club since August 2026.

== Early life and junior football ==
McVeigh was born in Melbourne to mother Margaret (a former Victorian basketball player) and father Tony (a former Williamstown Football Club player). Following their move from Melbourne to the Central Coast, Tony began coaching and captaining the Killarney Vale Bombers where Mark and his brother Jarrad would eventually play junior football.

== Playing career ==
=== Essendon Football Club ===
==== Early career (1999–2004) ====
After having a slow start with a season high of 15 Disposals and 4 Marks, in his second season he suffered an injury and missed most of Essendons games. In McVeigh's third season however, it was clear that the game had grown on him as he stood up as an up-and-coming youngster. After playing 23 games in his third year of playing including the Grand Final against the Brisbane Lions in which Essendon lost, McVeigh had some promising stats with a consistent 11 – 18 in over half of every game he played. McVeigh also went on to play the next 3 seasons in stellar form with Essendon who reached 3 consecutive semi-finals in which McVeigh played in all.

==== Mid-career (2005–2008) ====
In the next 3 seasons McVeigh was a stand out performer for Essendon, with a high disposal & efficiency rate he was one of the club's main contributors and eventually was to become a part of the Leadership group and a role model to his younger rookies. With disposals in the high 20s and a career high of 36 disposals, McVeigh was determined to get Essendon back on track. In 2008 McVeigh suffered an injury that sidelined him for almost half the season, nevertheless he claimed 13 Brownlow votes to his name in only 14 games, McVeigh finished in the top 20.

=== Retirement ===
McVeigh retired from professional Australian rules football on 29 August 2012. Injuries to his hip, knee and hamstring restricted McVeigh to only three games during the 2012 season. McVeigh stated, "It's a decision that I've been to-ing and fro-ing with for about eight weeks. But I've been very fortunate to part ways with the club on really good terms," during a press conference at Windy Hill. McVeigh shared the role of Vice-Captain of the Essendon Football Club with David Hille for most of his career. McVeigh played a total of 232 games and kicked 107 goals during his playing career for Essendon from 1999 until 2012.

== Media career ==
In 2013, following his retirement, McVeigh began a media career with the Seven Network and SEN 1116.

== Coaching career ==
He also began taking developmental coaching roles in New South Wales and Canberra. He coached the Under-16 and Under-18 NSW/ACT Rams teams in the national championships.

=== Greater Western Sydney ===
McVeigh then took a head coaching role at the Giants Academy, then transitioned into an assistant coaching role at the Greater Western Sydney Giants from 2015, serving as the defensive coach. McVeigh was appointed as the caretaker senior coach of GWS Giants until the end of the 2022 season, following the mid-season resignation of senior coach Leon Cameron. His first match in charge, in round 10, saw the Giants defeat West Coast by 52 points.

McVeigh attracted some criticism from the media after calling out his team's performance against Sydney in Round 20, 2022 but with a mostly unchanged side they would defeat his old club Essendon by 27 points the following week. The club ultimately finished 16th on the ladder with a 6–16 record, its lowest finish since the 2014 AFL season. At the end of the 2022 season, McVeigh was not retained as the senior coach of the GWS Giants and was replaced by Adam Kingsley. On 10 October, McVeigh left the club.

=== Sydney Swans ===
In December 2022, McVeigh joined the Sydney Swans as an assistant coach under senior coach John Longmire, then later under senior coach Dean Cox. McVeigh departed the Sydney Swans at the conclusion of the 2026 AFL season.

=== Essendon ===
On 24 August 2026, McVeigh was appointed the senior coach of the Essendon Football Club on the three year contract, returning to the club where he played his entire playing career. McVeigh replaced caretaker senior coach Dean Solomon, who replaced senior coach Brad Scott after Scott was sacked in the middle of the 2026 AFL season.

== Personal life ==
On 17 October 2009 McVeigh married his longtime girlfriend, Leanne Tucker. They have a daughter. Mark also had a niece, but she died from heart complications barely a month later. Following Essendon's seven-point victory over Port Adelaide, its first over the side since 2004, Mark 'blew a kiss towards to the heavens' in her memory. Essendon's players wore black armbands in the match.

== 2016 suspension from coaching ==
On 12 January 2016, McVeigh was named as one of 34 past and present Essendon players found guilty over their use of illegal supplements during the 2012 AFL season. As a result, McVeigh was suspended from involvement in football for twenty-four months, which (due to back-dating and time served in provisional suspensions) saw him suspended until November 2016. The terms of the suspension meant that McVeigh was unable to continue his assistant coaching role at Greater Western Sydney during 2016.

== Statistics ==
Statistics are correct to end of AFL career

Legend
G	Goals	K	Kicks	D	Disposals	T	Tackles
B	Behinds	H	Handballs	M	Marks

Season	Team	No.	Games	Totals							Averages (per game)						
Season	Team	No.	Games	G	B	K	H	D	M	T	G	B	K	H	D	M	T
1999	Essendon	10	9	2	5	44	17	61	13	4	0.2	0.6	4.9	1.9	6.8	1.4	0.4
2000	Essendon	10	1	0	1	2	0	2	1	1	0.0	1.0	2.0	0.0	2.0	1.0	1.0
2001	Essendon	10	23	18	11	173	74	247	55	57	0.8	0.5	7.5	3.2	10.7	2.4	2.5
2002	Essendon	10	24	7	13	223	68	291	73	60	0.3	0.5	9.3	2.8	12.1	4.6	2.5
2003	Essendon	10	24	9	7	210	78	288	67	64	0.4	0.3	8.8	3.2	12.0	2.8	2.7
2004	Essendon	10	18	3	1	155	104	259	55	58	0.2	0.1	8.6	5.8	14.4	3.1	3.2
2005	Essendon	10	21	7	8	211	90	301	84	53	0.3	0.4	10.0	4.3	14.3	4.0	2.5
2006	Essendon	10	21	9	11	216	91	307	77	62	0.4	0.5	10.3	4.3	14.6	3.7	3.0
2007	Essendon	10	21	20	16	270	116	386	104	60	1.0	0.8	12.9	5.5	18.4	5.0	2.9
2008	Essendon	10	14	14	7	219	96	315	61	44	1.0	0.5	15.6	6.9	22.5	4.4	3.1
2009	Essendon	10	12	5	3	110	81	191	33	35	0.4	0.2	9.2	6.8	15.9	2.8	2.9
2010	Essendon	10	18	7	4	177	92	269	52	52	0.4	0.2	9.8	5.1	14.9	2.9	2.9
2011	Essendon	10	23	5	7	252	107	359	65	75	0.2	0.3	11.0	4.6	15.6	2.8	3.3
2012	Essendon	10	3	1	0	28	11	39	15	3	0.3	0.0	9.3	3.7	13.0	5.0	1.0
Career			232	107	94	2290	1025	3315	755	628	0.5	0.4	9.9	4.4	14.3	3.3	2.7
