= Jonathon Patton =

Australian rules footballer

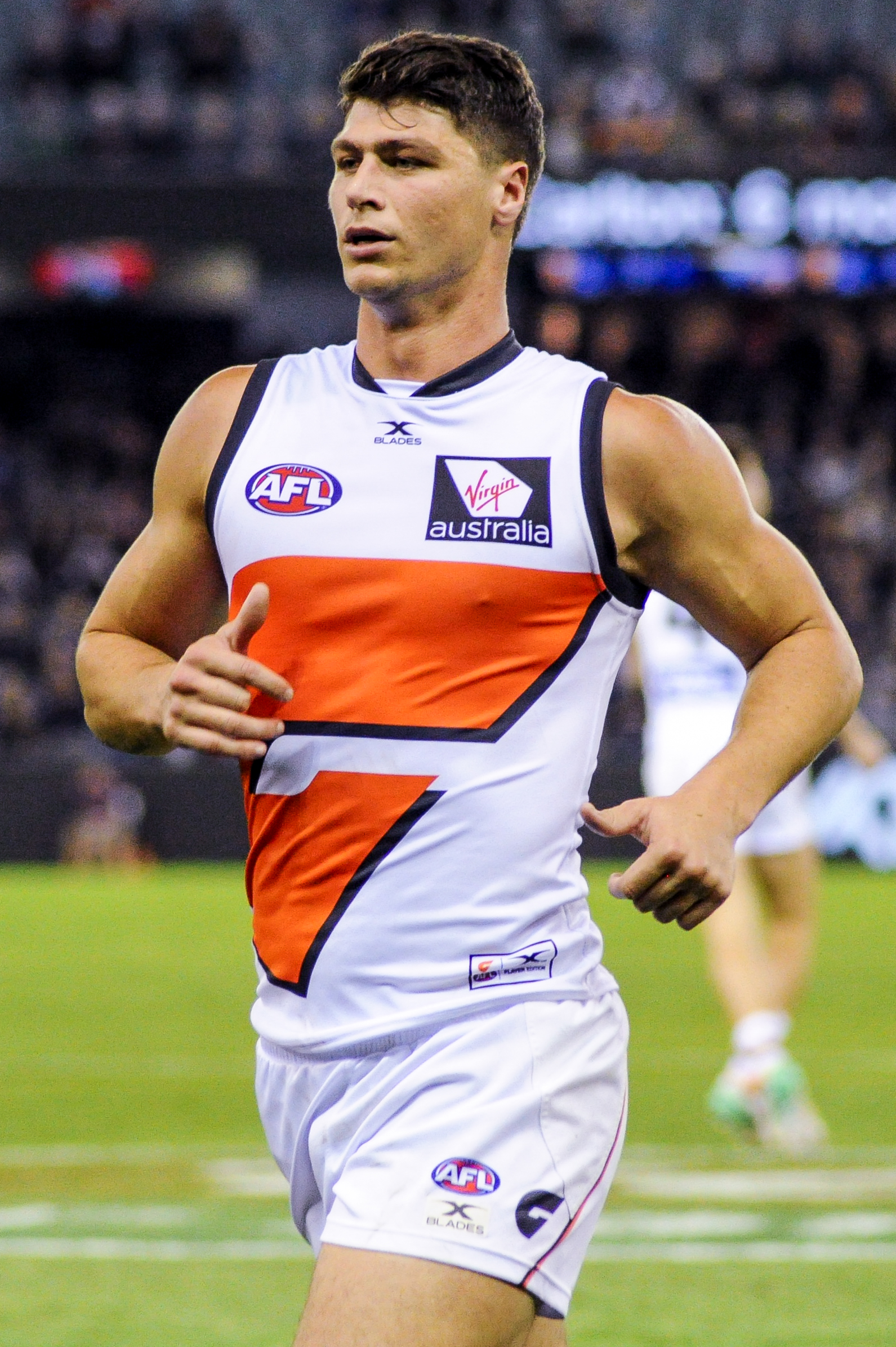
- Patton playing for GWS in 2017

Personal information
- Full name: Jonathon Patton
- Born: 20 May 1993 (age 33)
- Original team: Eastern Ranges (TAC Cup)
- Draft: No. 1, 2011 national draft
- Debut: Round 12, 2012, Greater Western Sydney vs. Richmond, at Škoda Stadium
- Height: 198 cm (6 ft 6 in)
- Weight: 101 kg (223 lb)
- Position: Forward / ruckman

Playing career^{1}
Years	Club	Games (Goals)
2012–2019	Greater Western Sydney	89 (130)
2020	Hawthorn	6 (3)
Total		95 (133)
- ^{1} Playing statistics correct to the end of 2020.

Career highlights
- Greater Western Sydney leading goalkicker: 2017

Jonathon Patton (born 20 May 1993) is a former professional Australian rules footballer who played for the Greater Western Sydney Giants and Hawthorn Football Club in the Australian Football League (AFL)

Patton was taken with first selection in the 2011 AFL draft. Originally from Rowville, the 197 cm, 101 kg forward played for the Eastern Ranges in the 2011 TAC Cup season and was predicted to be the No 1 draft pick from early in the season. He was referred to by many as “The General”. He retired midway through the 2021 AFL season having played 95 games

== Personal life ==
Patton played his junior football with St Simons Knights Junior Football Club (now Rowville Knights), before joining the Eastern Ranges in the TAC Cup. He was a member of the AIS AFL Academy and was awarded best and fairest for the Eastern Ranges in 2010, going on to be named captain of the squad in 2011.

For Jonathon's schooling he went to St Simon the Apostle Primary School in Rowville and then attended Nazareth College until Year 11, then which he completed Year 12 at Rowville Secondary College.

His older brother, Chris Patton, is a basketball player who played for the University of California, Riverside, and also for Melbourne United in the National Basketball League.

== Career ==
Patton was recruited to the AFL by Greater Western Sydney with the first overall selection in the 2011 AFL National Draft. Patton travelled to Stockholm, Sweden in early 2012 for treatment on a jumper's knee injury, and missed the first eleven rounds of the 2012 season. Patton played his first AFL game on 16 June against Richmond, kicking one goal from seven disposals. In round 3, 2013, Patton's tenth career game, he suffered a torn anterior cruciate ligament, which would see him miss the remainder of the 2013 season. In round 21, 2014 after having a break out year Patton re-tore his ACL in the right knee and underwent a traditional knee reconstruction, which saw him miss 12 months.

After returning late in 2015 for three games the club chose to rest him for the remainder of the regular season so that he could benefit from an uninterrupted preparation for the following 2016 season. Patton had his most productive season to date with his contested marking a highlight. He kicked four goals in the preliminary final loss to the Western Bulldogs.

In 2017 the expectation that came with being number 1 draft pick began to be justified when he started to regularly win possessions and contests with his notable strength and marking skills. He had a career high 45 goals and 142 marks in his 22 games.

In 2018 Patton again injured his knee during a club training session requiring season ending surgery. He later tore his left ACL and missed the entire 2019 season. At the end of the 2019 season he requested a trade to Hawthorn, and was traded on 15 October.

In January 2021, Patton was stood down by Hawthorn for inappropriate behaviour after accusations were made that he inappropriately sent sexual images to several women over social media.

Patton retired from football on 16 April 2021, citing mental health issues.

=== After AFL ===
Patton signed mid year for Kangaroo Flat in the Bendigo Football Netball League in 2023. Away from football he works as a real estate agent on the Gold Coast.

== Statistics ==
Legend
G	Goals	K	Kicks	D	Disposals	T	Tackles
B	Behinds	H	Handballs	M	Marks

Season	Team	No.	Games	Totals							Averages (per game)							Votes
Season	Team	No.	Games	G	B	K	H	D	M	T	G	B	K	H	D	M	T	Votes
2012	Greater Western Sydney	12	7	4	4	28	20	48	20	9	0.6	0.6	4.0	2.8	6.8	2.8	1.3	0
2013	Greater Western Sydney	12	3	5	3	16	7	23	7	7	1.7	1.0	5.3	2.3	7.6	2.3	2.3	0
2014	Greater Western Sydney	12	19	25	17	147	68	215	96	28	1.3	0.9	7.8	3.6	11.3	5.0	1.5	0
2015	Greater Western Sydney	12	3	3	3	20	9	29	13	4	1.0	1.0	6.7	3.0	9.7	4.3	1.3	0
2016	Greater Western Sydney	12	23	38	16	160	75	235	131	33	1.7	0.7	7.0	3.2	10.2	5.7	1.4	5
2017	Greater Western Sydney	12	22	45	23	191	100	291	142	36	2.1	1.1	8.7	4.5	13.2	6.5	1.6	6
2018	Greater Western Sydney	12	12	10	10	89	74	163	58	32	0.8	0.8	7.4	6.2	13.6	4.8	2.7	0
2019	Greater Western Sydney	12	0	—	—	—	—	—	—	—	—	—	—	—	—	—	—	0
2020 (Note: The 2020 season was played with 17 home-and-away matches per team (down from 22) and 16-minute quarters with time on (down from 20-minute quarters with time on) due to the impact of the COVID-19 pandemic.)	Hawthorn	25	6	3	2	18	11	29	11	4	0.5	0.3	3.0	1.8	4.8	1.8	0.7	0
Career			95	133	78	669	364	1033	478	153	1.4	0.8	7.0	3.8	10.9	5.0	1.6	11

== Honours and achievements ==
Individual

- Greater Western Sydney leading goalkicker: 2017
- AFL Rising Star nominee: 2014
