= Stephen Coniglio =

Australian rules footballer

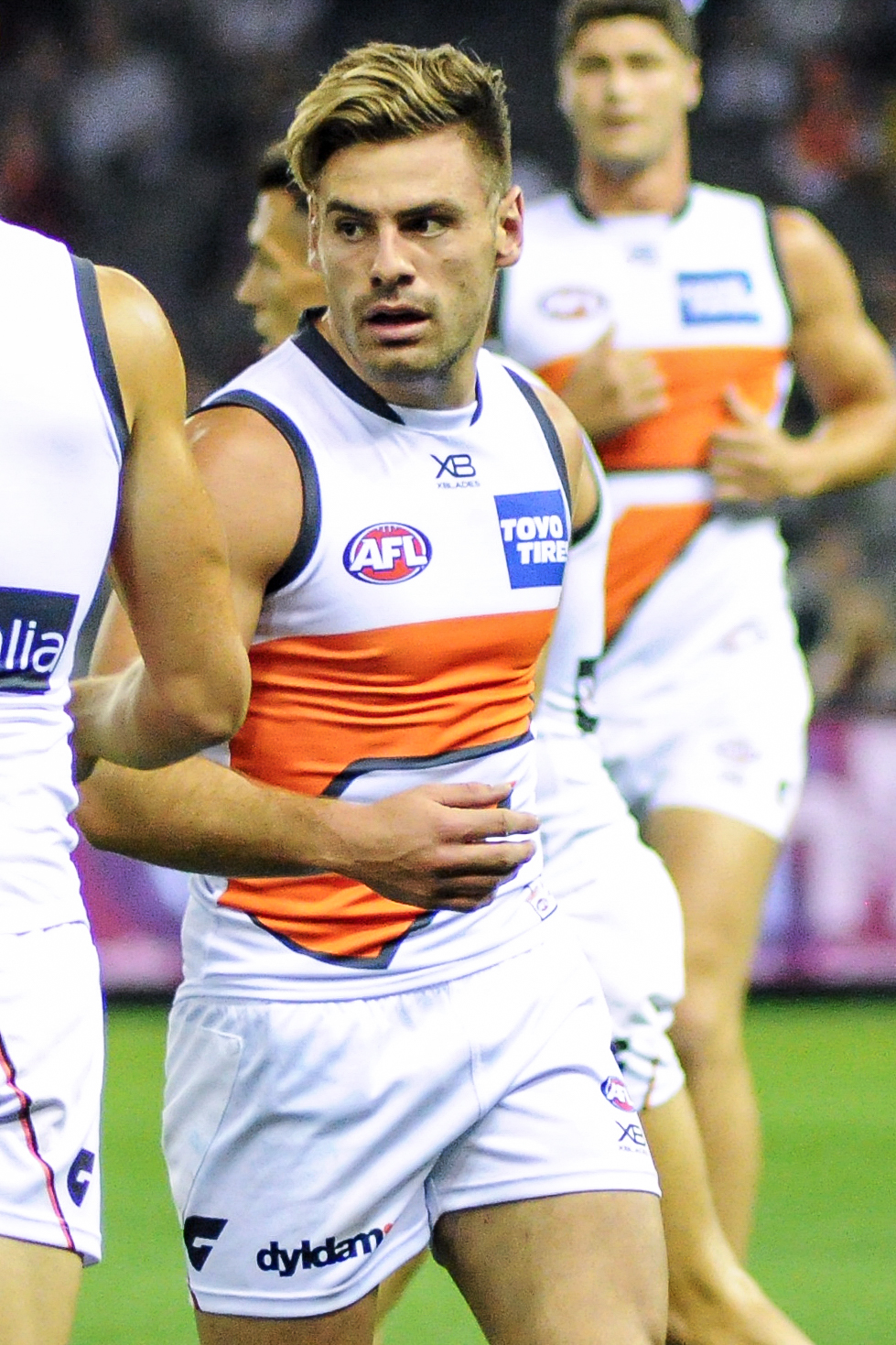
- Coniglio playing for the Greater Western Sydney Giants.

Personal information
- Full name: Stephen James Coniglio
- Born: 15 December 1993 (age 32); Joondalup, Western Australia
- Original team: Swan Districts (WAFL)
- Draft: No. 2, 2011 national draft, Greater Western Sydney
- Height: 182 cm (6 ft 0 in)
- Weight: 84 kg (185 lb)
- Position: Midfielder

Club information
- Current club: Greater Western Sydney
- Number: 3

Playing career^{1}
Years	Club	Games (Goals)
2012–	Greater Western Sydney	248 (137)

Representative team honours^{2}
Years	Team	Games (Goals)
2020	All-Stars	1 (2)
2026	Western Australia	1 (0)
- ^{1} Playing statistics correct to the end of 2026.^{2} Representative statistics correct as of 2026.

Career highlights
- Greater Western Sydney captain: 2020–22; Greater Western Sydney vice-captain: 2023–; AFL Rising Star nominee: 2012; 22under22 team: 2016; Jim Stynes Community Leadership Award: 2019; WAFL Premiership Player: (2010); Larke Medal 2011

Stephen Coniglio (/kəˈniːlioʊ/ kə-NEE-lee-oh; born 15 December 1993) is a professional Australian rules footballer for the Greater Western Sydney Giants in the Australian Football League (AFL). Drafted with the second pick in the 2011 AFL national draft, Coniglio made his debut for Greater Western Sydney in the first round of the 2012 season and was later nominated for the 2012 AFL Rising Star award. He was the sole captain of the Giants for the 2020 and 2021 seasons, and a co-captain for the 2022 season.

He previously played for Swan Districts in League and Development Squad in the West Australian Football League (WAFL). In the 2010 WAFL Grand Final, he gathered 17 possessions and kicked four goals to be considered one of the best on the ground. Only Geoff Hendriks has won a WAFL premiership at a younger age. Coniglio won the 2011 WAFL Rising Star Award, with a prize of $2000.

At the age of 16, Coniglio represented Western Australia at the 2010 National Under 18 Championships. Stephen represented Western Australia at the 2010 and 2011 National Under 18 Championships.

2011 saw Stephen captain WA and win the Larke Medal as the best player in the competition. As well as being named Western Australia's most valuable player, and was selected on a wing in the Under-18 All-Australian team.

Stephen Coniglio grew up in Perth and as a teenager had to choose between pursuing a career in cricket or football. Choosing football has worked out well for him so far, with the popular teammate becoming one of the most highly rated midfielders in the AFL. In early December, 2019 Coniglio was appointed captain. Off-field, Coniglio is a part-owner of Macelleria restaurants in Sydney and Melbourne and has a keen interest in fashion.

In January 2021, Coniglio was named as A-League club Perth Glory's number one ticket holder.

== Early life and junior career ==
Born in Joondalup, Western Australia, Coniglio's father has Italian heritage and his mother has English heritage. Coniglio attended La Salle College, a co-educational Catholic high school in Middle Swan. In his final year, he served as the school's head boy.

Growing up, Coniglio excelled at both cricket and football. He played grade cricket for Midland-Guildford in the WACA district cricket competition. In five First Grade matches he made 111 runs at an average of 22.20 and took five wickets at an average of 42.00, including 3/35 on his debut.

Coniglio played both under-15 and under-17 cricket for Western Australia. He made 106 not out in the final of the 2009 National Under-15 Championships, the highest score by a Western Australian ever recorded at the tournament. In the 2010–11 Australian Under-17 Championships, he made 146 runs at an average 24.33, with a best of 78 not out against Victoria.

Coniglio also played junior football for Upper Swan Junior Football Club, falling into Swan Districts' WAFL recruitment zone. He made his senior debut for Swan Districts against Perth in round 22, 2010, at Steel Blue Oval, gathering 26 possessions and kicking two goals.

== Senior career ==
In September 2011, Coniglio confirmed he would nominate for the 2011 national draft, ending speculation about which sport he would choose to play professionally. Considered likely to be selected by Greater Western Sydney with one of the first five picks in the draft, Coniglio was selected by Greater Western Sydney with pick two in the draft.

He made his senior debut for the club in round one of the 2012 season, recording 17 disposals in a 63-point loss to Sydney. In round seven, after a 31-possession game in Greater Western Sydney's inaugural win over Gold Coast, Coniglio was nominated for the 2012 AFL Rising Star. Midway through the season, he injured his thumb, and missed four games after undergoing surgery. In total, he played 12 games for Greater Western Sydney in his debut season, spending parts of the latter half of the season with the club's reserves team in the North East Australian Football League (NEAFL).

The end of the 2019 season saw Coniglio qualifying as a free agent. Despite many rumours that he would leave and join a Victorian-based club, Coniglio had rejected massive offers from Carlton and Hawthorn and had re-signed with the Giants for a further seven years. At the end of 2019, Coniglio was awarded the Jim Stynes Community Leadership Award for his part in the development of the Coniglio–Farrugia Community Program in partnership with the New South Wales Government, as well as ambassador roles with the Fairfield Falcons Football Club, All Nations Cup, Diversity Talent and Bachar Houli programs and the Lighthouse Community Support program.

== In the media ==
Coniglio features in the 2021 fly-on-the-wall documentary TV series Making Their Mark, which showed the impact of the COVID-19 pandemic on several AFL clubs, players, and staff. Nic Naitanui and Eddie Betts were filmed almost continuously, with other players featured including Coniglio and Rory Sloane, along with several coaches and other staff associated with the clubs.

== Statistics ==
Updated to the end of round 22, 2026.

Legend
G	Goals	K	Kicks	D	Disposals	T	Tackles
B	Behinds	H	Handballs	M	Marks

Season	Team	No.	Games	Totals							Averages (per game)							Votes
Season	Team	No.	Games	G	B	K	H	D	M	T	G	B	K	H	D	M	T	Votes
2012	Greater Western Sydney	3	12	2	5	140	118	258	58	31	0.2	0.4	11.7	9.8	21.5	4.8	2.6	1
2013	Greater Western Sydney	3	18	6	5	192	156	348	65	67	0.3	0.3	10.7	8.7	19.3	3.6	3.7	0
2014	Greater Western Sydney	3	14	5	5	169	139	308	51	68	0.4	0.4	12.1	9.9	22.0	3.6	4.9	2
2015	Greater Western Sydney	3	18	8	3	185	236	421	64	98	0.4	0.2	10.3	13.1	23.4	3.6	5.4	4
2016	Greater Western Sydney	3	23	12	10	291	353	644	70	129	0.5	0.4	12.7	15.3	28.0	3.0	5.6	17
2017	Greater Western Sydney	3	10	6	5	130	127	257	35	64	0.6	0.5	13.0	12.7	25.7	3.5	6.4	3
2018	Greater Western Sydney	3	23	24	17	374	269	643	108	116	1.0	0.7	16.3	11.7	28.0	4.7	5.0	11
2019	Greater Western Sydney	3	15	15	6	249	150	399	63	59	1.0	0.4	16.6	10.0	26.6	4.2	3.9	17
2020 (Note: The 2020 season was played with 17 home-and-away matches per team (down from 22) and 16-minute quarters with time on (down from 20-minute quarters with time on) due to the impact of the COVID-19 pandemic.)	Greater Western Sydney	3	16	5	8	196	141	337	44	62	0.3	0.5	12.3	8.8	21.1	2.8	3.9	4
2021	Greater Western Sydney	3	7	1	4	61	42	103	14	27	0.1	0.6	8.7	6.0	14.7	2.0	3.9	0
2022	Greater Western Sydney	3	21	17	11	283	240	523	78	110	0.8	0.5	13.5	11.4	24.9	3.7	5.2	4
2023	Greater Western Sydney	3	25	15	16	397	310	707	80	116	0.6	0.6	15.9	12.4	28.3	3.2	4.6	10
2024	Greater Western Sydney	3	15	4	5	169	147	316	28	50	0.3	0.3	11.3	9.8	21.1	1.9	3.3	1
2025	Greater Western Sydney	3	10	4	1	97	55	152	16	40	0.4	0.1	9.7	5.5	15.2	1.6	4.0	0
2026	Greater Western Sydney	3	19	13	7	161	150	311	52	53	0.7	0.4	8.5	7.9	16.4	2.7	2.8	0
Career			246	137	108	3094	2633	5727	826	1090	0.6	0.4	12.6	10.7	23.3	3.4	4.4	74
