= Kirk–Ward Medal =

Award in Australian rules football

- Awarded for: The best player on the ground in Sydney Derby Australian rules football matches
- Location: Sydney, Australia
- Country: Australia
- Presented by: AFL
- First award: 2012
- Final award: 2026
- Currently held by: Errol Gulden (Sydney)

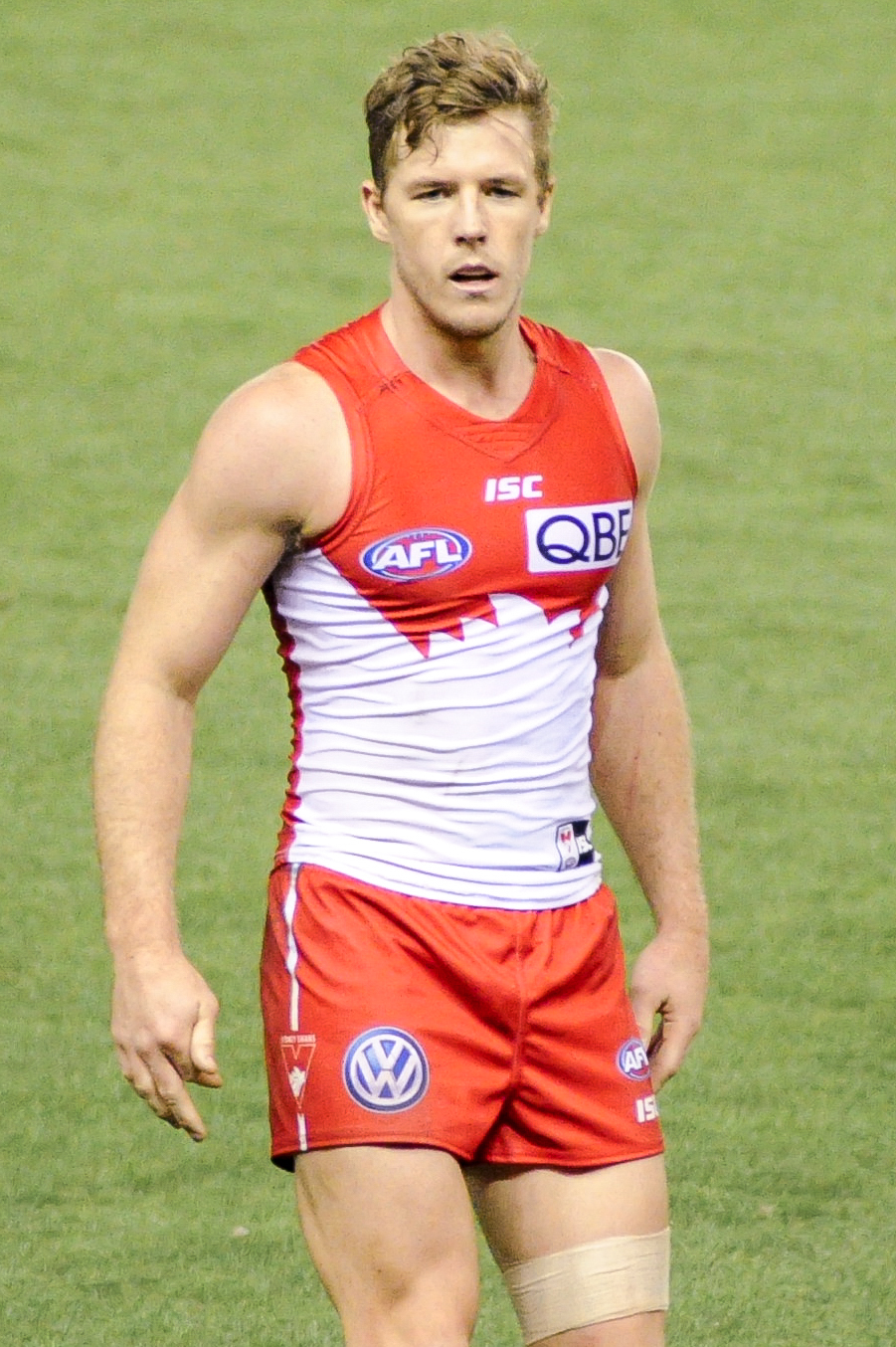
Former Sydney Swans captain Luke Parker holds the record for most medals (5)

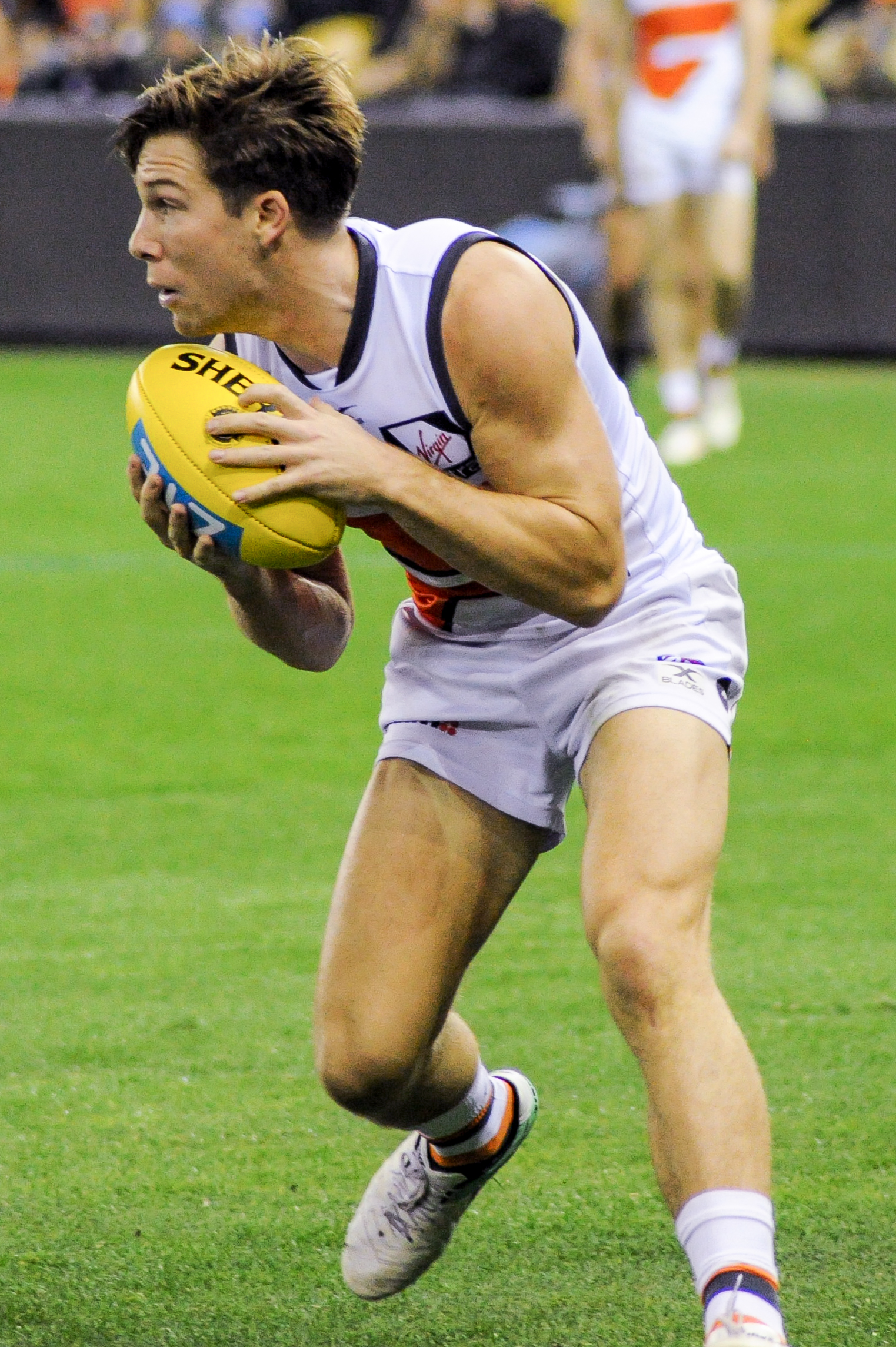
Former GWS Giants captain Toby Greene won the medal in round 7, 2023

The Kirk–Ward Medal, formerly known as the Brett Kirk Medal, is awarded to the player deemed to be the best player on the ground after the Sydney Derby, contested between Greater Western Sydney and Sydney. It is named after Sydney AFL premiership player Brett Kirk—born and raised in country New South Wales and played junior football for North Albury—, and inaugural GWS Giants player Callan Ward—the club's first Kevin Sheedy Medal in 2012 and co-captain between 2012 and 2019.

The medal is not awarded if the two teams meet in a final, as has been the case four times. There was a draw for the medal in the 13th installment of the rivalry in 2017, with Lance Franklin and Callan Ward sharing the medal. Ward (XIII) and Franklin (XX) are the only players to win the medal in losing teams.

== Winners ==
Players highlighted in green are current players for either club.

Year	Match	Medalist	Team
2012	I	Josh Kennedy	Sydney
2012	II	Kieren Jack	Sydney
2013	III	Kieren Jack (2)	Sydney
2013	IV	Nick Malceski	Sydney
2014	V	Callan Ward	GWS
2014	VI	Kieren Jack (3)	Sydney
2015	VII	Dan Hannebery	Sydney
2015	VIII	Josh Kennedy (2)	Sydney
2016	IX	Luke Parker	Sydney
2016	X	Heath Shaw	GWS
2017	XII	Shane Mumford	GWS
2017	XIII	Lance Franklin	Sydney
2017	XIII	Callan Ward (2)	GWS
2018	XIV	Callum Mills	Sydney
2018	XV	Lance Franklin (2)	Sydney
2019	XVII	Tim Taranto	GWS
2019	XVIII	Jacob Hopper	GWS
2020	XIX	Luke Parker (2)	Sydney
2021	XX	Lance Franklin (3)	Sydney
2021	XXI	Luke Parker (3)	Sydney
2022	XXIII	Luke Parker (4)	Sydney
2022	XXIV	Luke Parker (5)	Sydney
2023	XXV	Toby Greene	GWS
2023	XXVI	Errol Gulden	Sydney
2024	XXVII	Errol Gulden (2)	Sydney
2024	XXVIII	Errol Gulden (3)	Sydney
2025	XXX	Chad Warner	Sydney
2025	XXXI	Finn Callaghan	GWS
2026	XXXII	Nick Blakey	Sydney
2026	XXXIII	Errol Gulden (4)	Sydney

NOTE: No medal was awarded in Sydney Derby XI, Sydney Derby XVI, Sydney Derby XXII or Sydney Derby XXIX due to those matches being finals matches.

== Most wins ==
Number	Player	Team	Medals
5	Luke Parker	Sydney	IX (2016); XIX (2020); XXI (2021); XXII, XXIV (2022)
4	Errol Gulden	Sydney	XXVI (2023); XXVII, XXVIII (2024); XXXIII (2026)
3	Lance Franklin	Sydney	XIII (2017); XV (2018); XX (2021)
3	Kieran Jack	Sydney	II (2012); III (2013); VI (2014)
2	Josh Kennedy	Sydney	I (2012); VII (2015)
2	Callan Ward	GWS	V (2014); XIII (2017)

== See also ==
- Sydney Derby (AFL)
- Showdown Medal
- Glendinning–Allan Medal
- Marcus Ashcroft Medal
