= 2016 All-Australian team =

The 2016 Virgin Australia All-Australian team represents the best performed Australian Football League (AFL) players during the 2016 season. It was announced on 1 September as a complete Australian rules football team of 22 players. The team is honorary and does not play any games.

== Selection panel ==
The selection panel for the 2016 All-Australian team consisted of chairman Gillon McLachlan, Kevin Bartlett, Luke Darcy, Mark Evans, Danny Frawley, Glen Jakovich, Cameron Ling, Matthew Richardson and Warren Tredrea.

== Team ==
=== Initial squad ===
The initial 40-man squad was announced on 29 August. Adelaide had the most nominations with six, while cross-town rivals Sydney and Greater Western Sydney both had five nominations each. The two worst-performed teams during the season, Essendon and the Brisbane Lions, were the only clubs not to receive a nomination.

Club	Total	Player(s)
Adelaide	6	Eddie Betts, Josh Jenkins, Rory Laird, Tom Lynch, Rory Sloane, Daniel Talia
Brisbane Lions	0	
Carlton	2	Sam Docherty, Kade Simpson
Collingwood	2	Scott Pendlebury, Adam Treloar
Essendon	0	
Fremantle	1	Lachie Neale
Geelong	3	Patrick Dangerfield, Corey Enright, Joel Selwood
Gold Coast	1	Tom Lynch
Greater Western Sydney	5	Stephen Coniglio, Toby Greene, Tom Scully, Heath Shaw, Callan Ward
Hawthorn	3	Jack Gunston, Sam Mitchell, Cyril Rioli
Melbourne	1	Max Gawn
North Melbourne	1	Robbie Tarrant
Port Adelaide	1	Jasper Pittard
Richmond	2	Dustin Martin, Alex Rance
St Kilda	1	Jack Steven
Sydney	5	Lance Franklin, Dan Hannebery, Josh Kennedy, Luke Parker, Dane Rampe
West Coast	4	Andrew Gaff, Josh Kennedy, Jeremy McGovern, Luke Shuey
Western Bulldogs	2	Marcus Bontempelli, Matthew Boyd

=== Final team ===
Minor premiers Sydney had the most selections with five. Geelong captain Joel Selwood was announced as the All-Australian captain, with Adelaide midfielder Rory Sloane announced as the vice-captain. The team saw nine players selected in an All-Australian side for the first time in their careers.

2016 All-Australian team
B:	Dane Rampe (Sydney)	Alex Rance (Richmond)	Jeremy McGovern (West Coast)
HB:	Heath Shaw (Greater Western Sydney)	Daniel Talia (Adelaide)	Corey Enright (Geelong)
C:	Dan Hannebery (Sydney)	Josh Kennedy (Sydney)	Rory Sloane (Adelaide) (vice-captain)
HF:	Toby Greene (Greater Western Sydney)	Lance Franklin (Sydney)	Cyril Rioli (Hawthorn)
F:	Eddie Betts (Adelaide)	Josh Kennedy (West Coast)	Tom Lynch (Gold Coast)
Foll:	Max Gawn (Melbourne)	Patrick Dangerfield (Geelong)	Joel Selwood (Geelong) (captain)
Int:	Marcus Bontempelli (Western Bulldogs)	Luke Parker (Sydney)	Dustin Martin (Richmond)
Int:	Matthew Boyd (Western Bulldogs)		
Coach:	Luke Beveridge (Western Bulldogs)		

Note: the position of coach in the All-Australian team is traditionally awarded to the coach of the premiership team.
