= Heath Shaw =

Australian rules footballer, born 1985

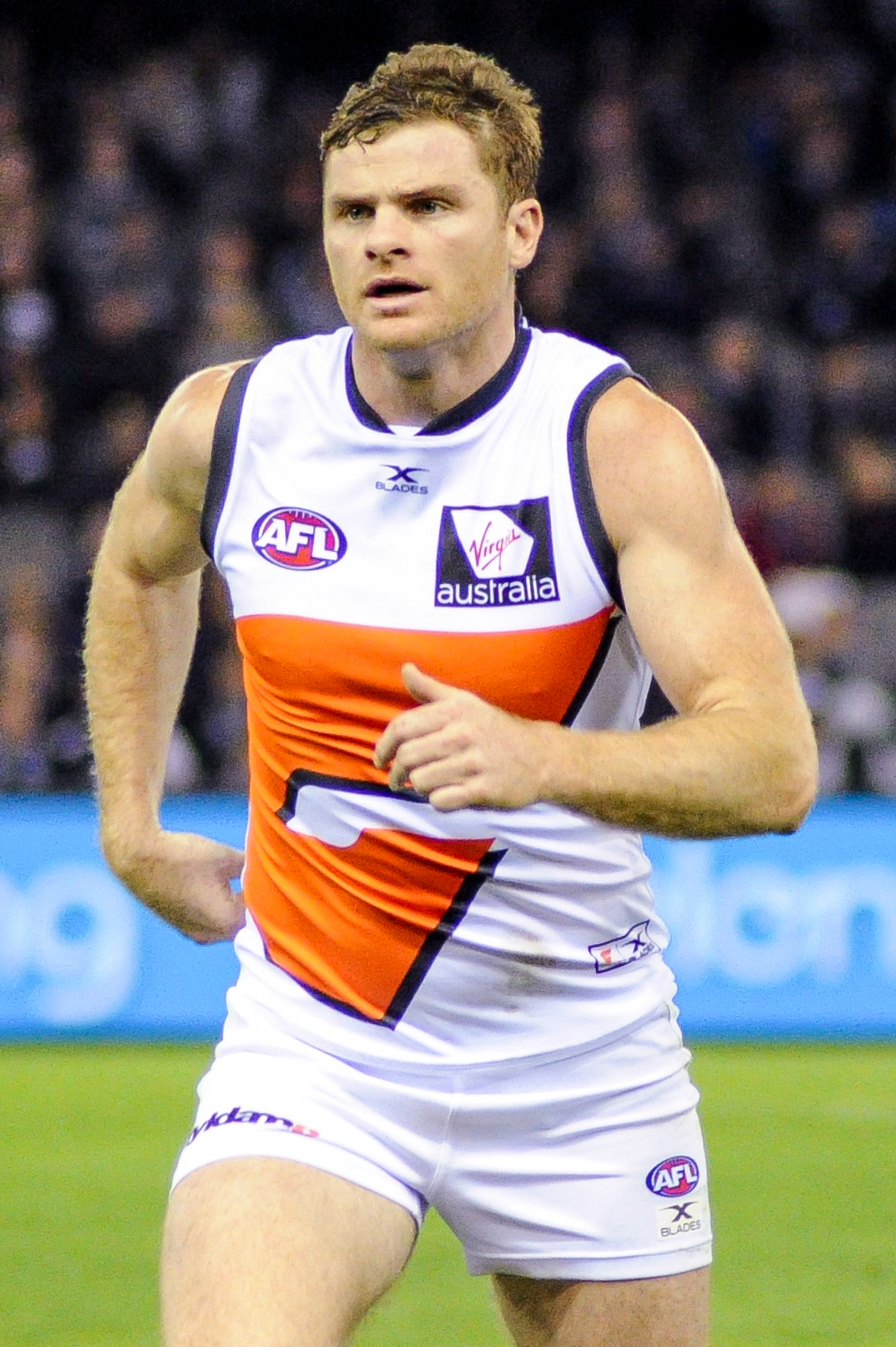
- Shaw playing for Greater Western Sydney in June 2017

Personal information
- Full name: Heath Shaw
- Nickname: The Heater
- Born: 27 November 1985 (age 40)
- Original team: Northern Knights (TAC Cup)
- Draft: No. 48 (F/S), 2003 national draft
- Height: 183 cm (6 ft 0 in)
- Weight: 86 kg (190 lb)
- Position: Defender

Playing career^{1}
Years	Club	Games (Goals)
2004–2013	Collingwood	173 (37)
2014–2020	Greater Western Sydney	152 (5)
Total		325 (42)

Representative team honours^{2}
Years	Team	Games (Goals)
2008	Victoria	1 (0)
- ^{1} Playing statistics correct to the end of 2020.^{2} Representative statistics correct as of 2008.

Career highlights
- AFL Premiership player: 2010; 2× All-Australian team: 2015, 2016; Kevin Sheedy Medal: 2015; AFL Rising Star nominee: 2006; AFL ANZAC Medal: 2007; 2× Bob Rose–Charlie Sutton Medal: 2011, 2013

Heath Shaw (born 27 November 1985) is a former Australian rules footballer who played for the Collingwood Football Club and the Greater Western Sydney Giants in the Australian Football League (AFL). Heath grew up in Diamond Creek and played junior sport for Diamond Creek Football Club and Diamond Creek Cricket Club.

== AFL career ==
After being drafted under the father–son rule in the 2003 AFL draft at pick 48 to Collingwood, Shaw made his AFL debut in 2005 against St Kilda at the Telstra Dome. He was a solid contributor since making his debut, with his best game being his first. A running defender, Heath has pace and good ball skills which can make him into a good footballer. He played the 6 remaining games of the season and kicked his first goal against Adelaide in Round 21.

=== Collingwood (2004–2013) ===
Shaw had a stunning 2006 season, being quickly noted for his ball-winning ability out of the back-line and his consistency and reliability which was a key to the success of the Magpies. He played 22 games, with his first being in Round 2 against Hawthorn after being a late replacement for Scott Burns. Shaw had played for VFL affiliate Williamstown, where he had 30 touches in wet and windy conditions, only 24 hours before his call up. Shaw kept his spot for the rest of the season, building game-time each week early on to becoming a valuable player to the side. In Round 4 on ANZAC Day against Essendon he had 23 touches and 10 marks, and in the following week, he won an AFL Rising Star nomination. Shaw had 16 games with 18 or more disposals during the season, which showed his consistency. He somewhat tailed off at the end of the season, but still was effective with his one percenters. Shaws ended up having 448 disposals (313 kicks, 135 handballs) at an average of more than 20 touches a game. His best game being against Port Adelaide where he had 27 kicks, six handballs, 11 marks and kicked a fantastic goal in a thriller at AAMI Stadium. Heath also had 160 marks and accumulated 2210 Champion Data ranking points at an average of 100, and was ranked inside the top 10 in a game on 13 occasions, including two no.1 game rankings.

Shaw played in his first final against the Western Bulldogs, but Collingwood lost. Shaw also came third in the 2006 AFL Rising Star behind Danyle Pearce of Port Adelaide and Andrew Raines of Richmond. Shaw also polled six votes in the 2006 Brownlow Medal, including a game-high of three votes in the Round 12 game against the Sydney Swans. Shaw also placed fourth in the 2006 Copeland Trophy.

In 2007, Shaw started the season in great fashion. He would have a solid pre-season and then become one of the players of the first quarter of the year; leading the league in kicks (114 @ 19.0) after round 6. He had an extraordinary opening game of the season, where he had 27 disposals, and collected two Brownlow votes despite giving away five free kicks, including a 50-metre penalty in the final minutes of the game, which resulted in a Shannon Grant controversial miss. On Anzac Day, Shaw would put on a show of courage and determination in where he won the Anzac Day Medal, racking up 23 kicks, nine handballs and 13 marks against the Bombers. Essendon coach Kevin Sheedy labelled the Shaw boys as trouble and a pair that needed to be stopped. Heath would be on notice by opposition coaches for the majority of the season, with taggers Kane Cornes and Kane Johnson to name a few would be told to restrict his run off half-back. Shaw's All-Australian form would deteriorate with the extra attention, as well as a corked thigh/quad he encountered against Fremantle in round ten. He would be heavily bandaged on his left leg for the rest of the season.

Shaw played an exciting brand of football late in the season, including a good finals series. He would have 25 disposals in the losing preliminary final in which the club lost to the eventual premiers, Geelong by five points. Shaw would poll seven votes in the Brownlow Medal, as well as finish equal fourth (fifth on the new countback system) in the Copeland Trophy and was considered unlucky not to be selected in the All-Australian team.

Shaw started 2008 well with a best-on-ground performance against Richmond, but found the going tough mid-season when opposition clubs finally discovered ways to curb his influence. Shaw and Alan Didak were suspended for the rest of the season by the club following a serious late-night indiscretion.

Hamstring troubles and a suspension for contact with an umpire caused a slow start to 2009. He played only two of the first six matches before returning in round seven against St Kilda and did not miss a beat for the remainder of the year. Was one of the most consistent Magpies in the finals. Finished third in the Copeland Trophy and won the Bob Rose Trophy as the Best Finals Player.

In 2010 he was one of Collingwood's best players across the two Grand Finals. He enshrined himself in Collingwood history in the replay by his freakish smother of Nick Riewoldt who meandered to the goal line. Shaw managed to knock the ball free from Riewoldt's hands before it could even touch his boot to save a certain goal and tip the momentum Collingwood's way.

By mid-year 2011 he was a popularly tipped by most pundits to be a certain inclusion in the All-Australian team but after he was found to have laid a bet on teammate he was suspended for the rest of the season.

In 2013, Shaw's on-field issues were highlighted again during Collingwood's loss to Port Adelaide in the Elimination Final where he played on Angus Monfries. During the game, Shaw gave away a crucial free kick in the goal square early in the second quarter and after the siren for half-time rang, he threw the ball at Monfries' head. At the end of the 2013 season, Collingwood agreed to trade Shaw despite signing a two-year contract extension in 2012.

=== Greater Western Sydney (2014–2020) ===
In October 2013, Shaw was traded to Greater Western Sydney in exchange for Taylor Adams.

In 2015, he won the Kevin Sheedy Medal as Greater Western Sydney's best and fairest.

Shaw was recognised for his defensive efforts by earning a place in the back-pocket in the 2015 All-Australian team. He was also selected in the 2016 All-Australian team, this time on the half-back line.

== Controversies ==
Shaw was involved in a late-season controversy in 2008 when he was charged with drink driving after crashing into a parked car and reportedly registering a blood alcohol reading of 0.144. On 4 August the Collingwood Football Club released a statement saying that Shaw had lied to them; teammate Alan Didak was his passenger when the accident happened, but Shaw and Didak denied this and the entire team fronted the media in a show of unity, where Shaw refused to divulge the identity of the passenger under media questioning. He was backed up by captain Scott Burns. However eyewitnesses identified Didak, and after the pair admitted to lying to their teammates and club officials, they were banned until the end of the season.

In Round 3, 2009, Shaw pushed umpire Michael Vozzo off-balance after he had paid a free kick to the opposition. This resulted in Shaw being suspended for one game and fined $1950.

Shaw was suspended by the AFL in July 2011 after it was found that he had paid $10 to a friend to bet on teammate Nick Maxwell to be the first goalscorer in Collingwood's Round 9 match against Adelaide. AFL integrity rules prohibit all players and club officials from participating in any form of betting on football matches. He was fined $20,000 and suspended for 8 weeks, as well as a six-week suspended sentence.

During the 2014 off-season, Shaw was detained by Victorian police for drunken behaviour early on the morning of the AFL Grand Final, which his brother Rhyce was to take part in for the Sydney Swans. He was the second Giants player to fall foul of the law in 2014, after teammate Toby Greene was suspended for five matches earlier in the season also for drunken behaviour following the team's 111-point loss to West Coast in Round 8.

In round five, 2017, during the third quarter of the twelfth Sydney Derby, Shaw made an insensitive comment towards Sydney Swans player Tom Papley while being tackled.

== Education ==
Shaw attended Loyola College, Watsonia, in Melbourne's outer north-east suburbs.

== Personal life ==
Shaw is the son of former Collingwood captain Ray Shaw, and brother of Rhyce. He is also the nephew of premiership captain and Norm Smith Medallist, Tony Shaw and former Collingwood player Neville Shaw. His cousin Brayden (son of Tony) was drafted in the same year as Heath, but he failed to play a game before being delisted in 2005.

== Statistics ==
Statistics are correct to the end of 2020

Legend
G	Goals	K	Kicks	D	Disposals	T	Tackles
B	Behinds	H	Handballs	M	Marks
#	Played in that season's premiership team	†	Led the league for the season

Season	Team	No.	Games	Totals							Averages (per game)							Votes
Season	Team	No.	Games	G	B	K	H	D	M	T	G	B	K	H	D	M	T	Votes
2005	Collingwood	39	6	1	0	66	24	90	40	11	0.2	0.0	11.0	4.0	15.0	6.7	1.8	0
2006	Collingwood	39	22	9	4	313	136	449	160	54	0.4	0.2	14.2	6.2	20.4	7.3	2.5	6
2007	Collingwood	39	25	2	4	361	126	487	164	68	0.1	0.2	14.4	5.0	19.5	6.6	2.7	7
2008	Collingwood	39	18	6	5	247	119	366	125	33	0.3	0.3	13.7	6.6	20.3	6.9	1.8	5
2009	Collingwood	39	21	2	3	295	187	482	118	43	0.1	0.1	14.0	8.9	23.0	5.6	2.0	5
2010^{#}	Collingwood	39	23	5	3	345	144	489	129	53	0.2	0.1	15.0	6.3	21.3	5.6	2.3	5
2011	Collingwood	39	17	2	2	282	95	377	116	60	0.1	0.1	16.6	5.6	22.2	6.8	3.5	3
2012	Collingwood	39	21	9	2	318	105	423	107	58	0.4	0.1	15.1	5.0	20.1	5.1	2.8	1
2013	Collingwood	39	20	1	6	278	113	391	114	60	0.1	0.3	13.9	5.7	19.6	5.7	3.0	0
2014	Greater Western Sydney	23	17	0	3	275	82	357	83	30	0.0	0.2	16.2	4.8	21.0	4.9	1.8	0
2015	Greater Western Sydney	23	22	1	2	420^{†}	97	517	145	61	0.0	0.1	19.1^{†}	4.4	23.5	6.6	2.8	0
2016	Greater Western Sydney	23	24	1	0	503^{†}	77	580	183	61	0.0	0.0	21.0^{†}	3.2	24.2	7.6	2.5	2
2017	Greater Western Sydney	23	25	0	4	393	122	515	151	37	0.0	0.2	15.7	4.9	20.6	6.0	1.5	0
2018	Greater Western Sydney	23	20	0	2	361	84	445	115	53	0.0	0.1	18.1	4.2	22.3	5.8	2.7	0
2019	Greater Western Sydney	23	26	0	1	419	103	522	177	60	0.0	0.0	16.1	4.0	20.1	6.8	2.3	0
2020 (Note: The 2020 season was played with 17 home-and-away matches per team (down from 22) and 16-minute quarters with time on (down from 20-minute quarters with time on) due to the impact of the COVID-19 pandemic.)	Greater Western Sydney	23	17	3	1	162	47	209	78	38	0.0	0.0	9.5	2.8	12.3	4.6	2.2	0
Career			325	42	42	5062	1667	6729	2017	781	0.1	0.1	15.8	5.2	21.0	6.3	2.4	34
