= Tim Taranto =

Australian rules footballer (born 1998)

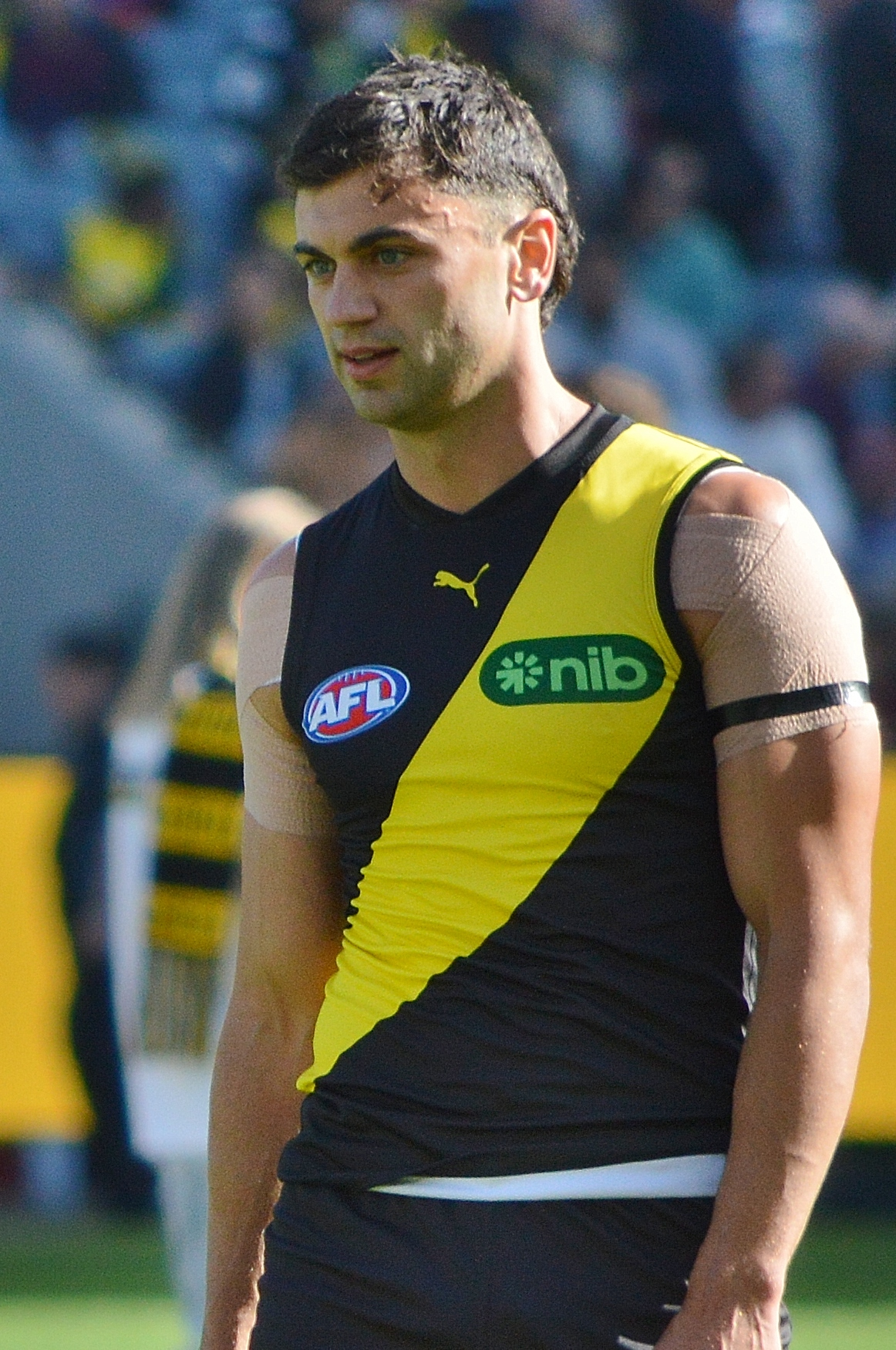
- Taranto pre-match with Richmond in 2025

Personal information
- Full name: Timothy Taranto
- Born: 28 January 1998 (age 28)
- Original team: Sandringham Dragons (TAC Cup)
- Draft: No. 2, 2016 national draft
- Debut: Round 1, 2017, Greater Western Sydney vs. Adelaide, at Adelaide Oval
- Height: 188 cm (6 ft 2 in)
- Weight: 89 kg (196 lb)
- Position: Midfielder

Club information
- Current club: Richmond
- Number: 14

Playing career^{1}
Years	Club	Games (Goals)
2017–2022	Greater Western Sydney	114 (48)
2023–	Richmond	80 (55)
Total		194 (103)
- ^{1} Playing statistics correct to the end of the 2026 season.

Career highlights
- Kevin Sheedy Medal: 2019; 3× Jack Dyer Medal: 2023, 2025, 2026; Brett Kirk Medal: 2019 (game 1); Ian Stewart Medal: 2023; AFL Rising Star nominee: 2017

Timothy Taranto (born 28 January 1998) is a professional Australian rules footballer playing for the Richmond Football Club in the Australian Football League (AFL). He previously played for the Greater Western Sydney Giants from 2017 to 2022. Taranto is a four-time club best and fairest, having won the Kevin Sheedy Medal in 2019 and the Jack Dyer Medal in 2023, 2025 and 2026.

== Early life ==
Taranto was born in Melbourne to an Australian mother and an American father from Texas, and grew up in the Melbourne suburb of Parkdale. His parents separated when he was two and his father returned to the United States, and he was regularly looked after by his maternal grandparents, Paul and Dianne. Taranto attended St Kevin's College in Toorak from the age of ten and played junior football for the Mordialloc-Braeside Junior Football Club. He played TAC Cup football for the Sandringham Dragons and grew up supporting the Melbourne Football Club.

== AFL career ==
=== Greater Western Sydney (2017–2022) ===
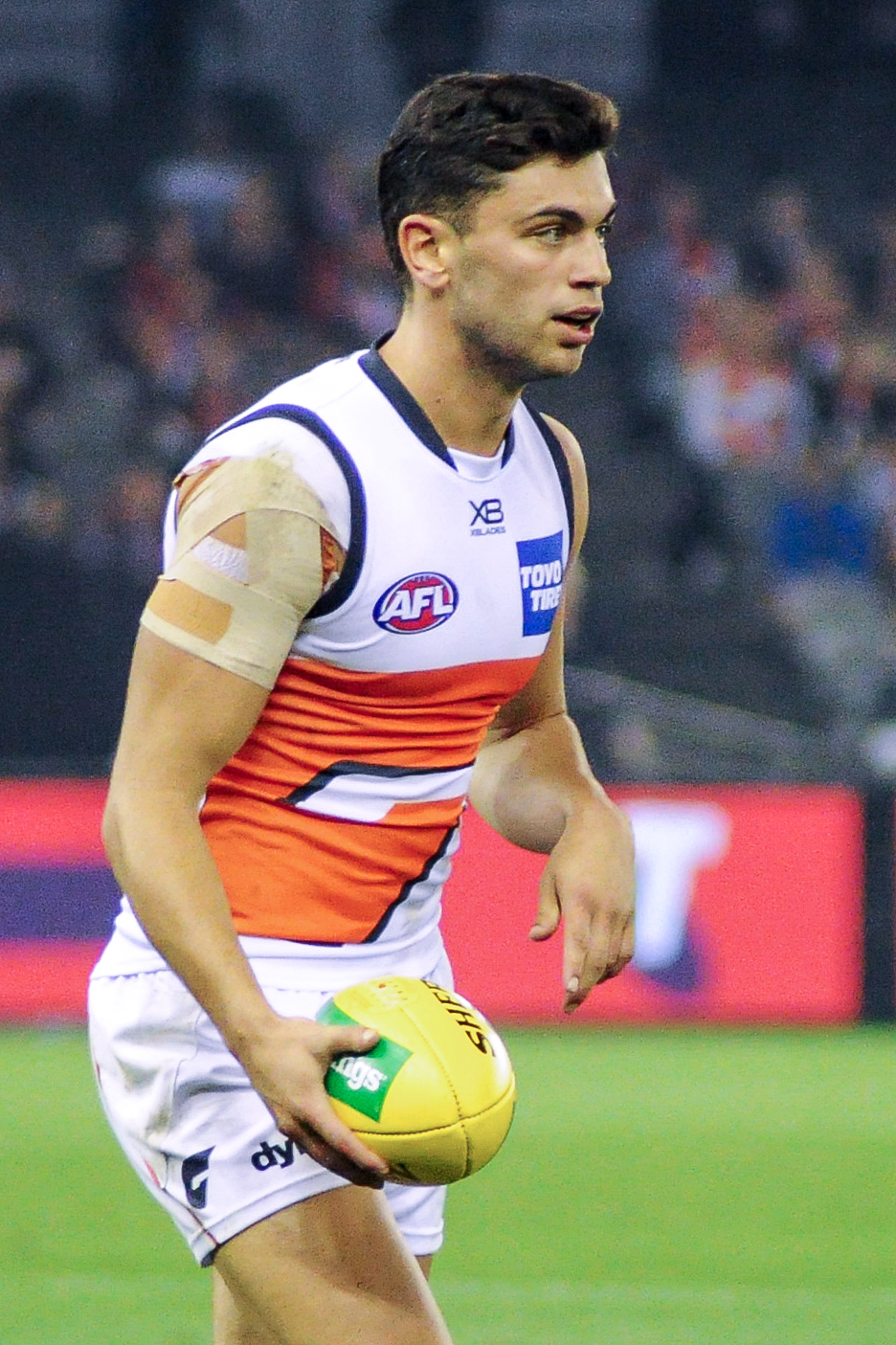
Taranto playing for Greater Western Sydney in 2018

Taranto was drafted by Greater Western Sydney with their first selection and second overall in the 2016 national draft. He made his debut in the 56-point loss against Adelaide in the opening round of the 2017 season at Adelaide Oval. Taranto was nominated for the 2017 AFL Rising Star after gathering 21 disposals, laid five tackles and had six score involvements in the Giants' three-point win over Collingwood at Spotless Stadium in round 8, 2017.

=== Richmond (2023–present) ===
Taranto was traded to Richmond on a seven-year deal at the end of the 2022 AFL season. In his first year at the club, Taranto received the Ian Stewart Medal for his best on ground performance with a game-high and equal career-high 38 disposals, game-high 18 contested possessions, game-high 10 tackles, four inside-50s, six clearances and the match-sealing goal against St Kilda during their round 14 clash.

== Statistics ==
Updated to the end of round 22, 2026.

Legend
G	Goals	K	Kicks	D	Disposals	T	Tackles
B	Behinds	H	Handballs	M	Marks

Season	Team	No.	Games	Totals							Averages (per game)							Votes
Season	Team	No.	Games	G	B	K	H	D	M	T	G	B	K	H	D	M	T	Votes
2017	Greater Western Sydney	14	14	7	4	105	110	215	31	54	0.5	0.3	7.5	7.9	15.4	2.2	3.9	0
2018	Greater Western Sydney	14	23	6	14	271	208	479	83	140	0.3	0.6	11.8	9.0	20.8	3.6	6.1	0
2019	Greater Western Sydney	14	26	11	13	431	290	721	121	164	0.4	0.5	16.6	11.2	27.7	4.7	6.3	9
2020 (Note: The 2020 season was played with 17 home-and-away matches per team (down from 22) and 16-minute quarters with time on (down from 20-minute quarters with time on) due to the impact of the COVID-19 pandemic.)	Greater Western Sydney	14	11	4	3	132	80	212	30	45	0.4	0.3	12.0	7.3	19.3	2.7	4.1	3
2021	Greater Western Sydney	14	24	13	13	372	265	637	118	127	0.5	0.5	15.5	11.0	26.5	4.9	5.3	15
2022	Greater Western Sydney	14	16	7	7	220	187	407	57	76	0.4	0.4	13.8	11.7	25.4	3.6	4.8	6
2023	Richmond	14	23	19	14	337	325	662	79	154	0.8	0.6	14.7	14.1	28.8	3.4	6.7	19
2024	Richmond	14	15	6	10	185	190	375	53	80	0.4	0.7	12.3	12.7	25.0	3.5	5.3	5
2025	Richmond	14	21	15	5	219	319	538	63	103	0.7	0.2	10.4	15.2	25.6	3.0	4.9	20
2026	Richmond	14	21	15	14	237	283	520	62	109	0.7	0.7	11.3	13.5	24.8	3.0	5.2	10
Career			194	103	97	2510	2256	4767	697	1052	0.5	0.5	12.9	11.6	24.6	3.6	5.4	87

== Honours and achievements ==
- Kevin Sheedy Medal: 2019
- 3× Jack Dyer Medal: 2023, 2025, 2026
- Brett Kirk Medal: 2019 (game 1)
- Ian Stewart Medal: 2023
- AFL Rising Star nominee: 2017
