= Luke Parker (footballer) =

Australian rules footballer (born 1992)

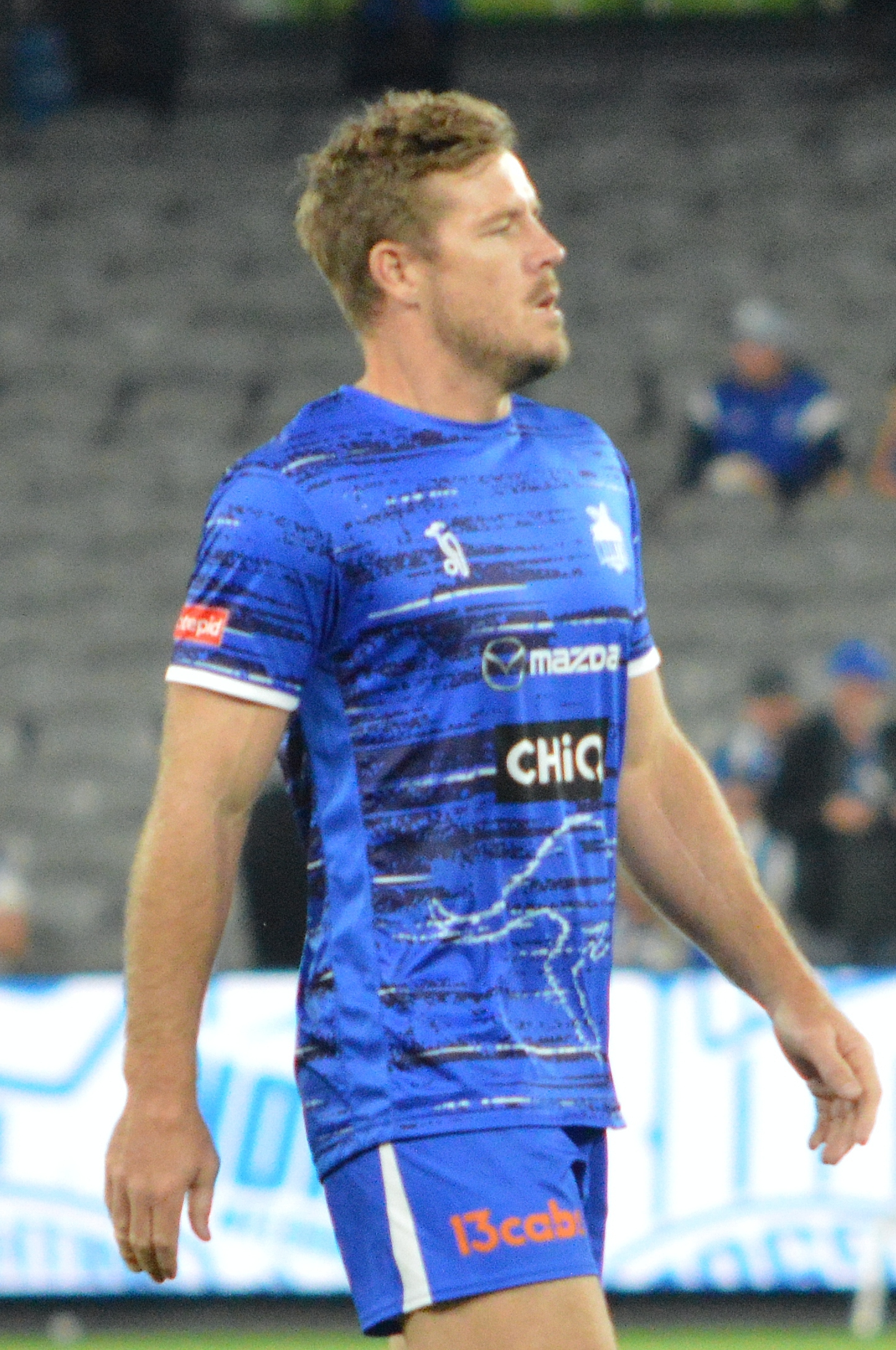
- Parker with North Melbourne in March 2026

Personal information
- Full name: Luke Parker
- Born: 25 October 1992 (age 34)
- Original team: Dandenong Stingrays (TAC Cup)
- Draft: No. 40, 2010 National Draft
- Height: 183 cm (6 ft 0 in)
- Weight: 85 kg (187 lb)
- Position: Midfielder

Club information
- Current club: North Melbourne
- Number: 26

Playing career^{1}
Years	Club	Games (Goals)
2011–2024	Sydney	293 (213)
2025–	North Melbourne	45 (15)
Total		338 (228)
- ^{1} Playing statistics correct to the end of the 2026 season.

Career highlights
- AFL premiership player: 2012; Sydney Swans co-captain 2019–2023; 3× Bob Skilton Medal: 2014, 2017, 2021; All-Australian team: 2016; 2× Robert Rose Award: 2015, 2016; 5× Brett Kirk Medal: 2016, 2020, 2021, 2× 2022; 2× 22 under22 team: 2014, 2015

Luke Parker (born 25 October 1992) is a professional Australian rules footballer who plays for the North Melbourne Football Club in the Australian Football League (AFL). He has played most of his career as a midfielder, before transitioning to a halfback role in 2026.

Originally from Langwarrin, Victoria, Parker played for the Dandenong Stingrays before being drafted by Sydney with the 40th pick in the 2010 National Draft. He made his senior debut in round eight of the 2011 season, and quickly established himself in the line-up. Parker won a premiership in his second season, and has since played in four more losing grand finals (in 2014, 2016, 2022 and 2024). He won the Bob Skilton Medal as Sydney's best and fairest player in 2014, 2017 and 2021. He also finished runner-up to Patrick Dangerfield in the 2016 Brownlow Medal, a season in which he was also named in the All-Australian team for the first time.

== Early life ==
Parker grew up in Langwarrin, Victoria, on Melbourne's south-eastern outskirts. He played both basketball and football as a youngster, eventually choosing to pursue the latter at the age of 16. In the TAC Cup, Parker played for the Dandenong Stingrays and won the club best and fairest in his first season. He made the TAC Cup Team of the Year in 2010, although he broke his jaw in the competition's preliminary final. Parker also played for Victoria Country in the 2010 AFL Under 18 Championships.

Parker was educated at St Peter's Catholic College in Cranbourne West.

== AFL career ==
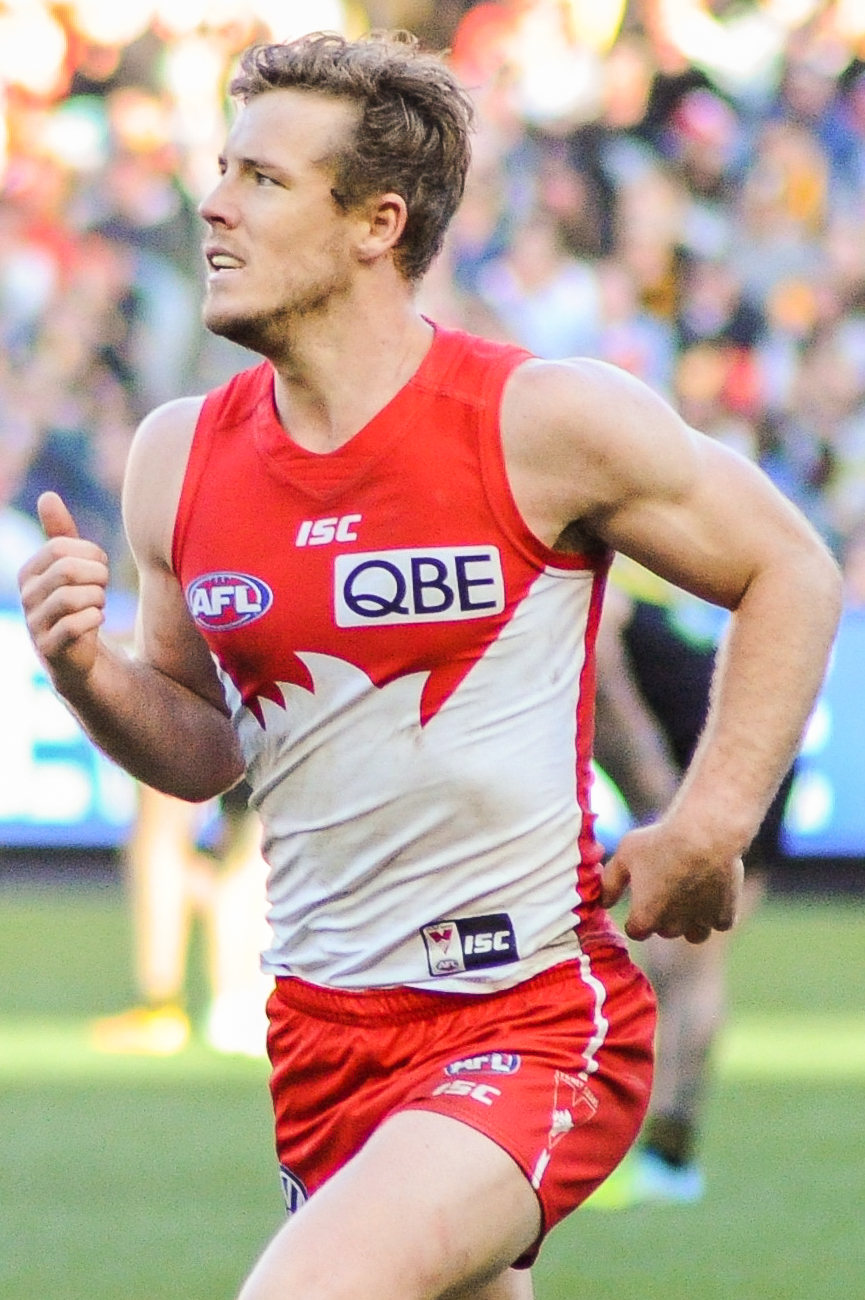
Parker playing for Sydney in June 2017

Parker was drafted by Sydney with the club's second pick (and 40th overall) in the 2010 National Draft. He made his debut in Round 8 of the 2011 AFL season against Port Adelaide. He received his first career Brownlow Medal vote in the Swans' Round 16 victory over the Gold Coast Suns where he had 26 disposals and kicked two goals, helping the side to its first win on the Gold Coast for twenty-four years.

It was an impressive debut year from Parker playing as small, tackling forward and in the midfield. He was compared to his teammate Jude Bolton, due to his hardness at the contest, strong tackling and ability to win contested possession.

The young midfielder took a significant step forward in 2013, moving from a regular substitute at the back end of the previous season to a dangerous and highly valued member of the starting line-up. Playing every game, he averaged 21 disposals and five marks and proved a more than handy forward, finishing with 22 goals.

In 2014, Parker further made his mark on the team becoming the youngest player since Michael O'Loughlin in 1998 to be awarded the Bob Skilton Medal recognised by the coaches as the Swans' Best and Fairest. He also won the Paul Kelly Players' Player award which is voted on each week by the playing group.

In 2015, Parker became a member of the leadership group, at 22 years of age. His courage and determination on the field was recognised by his peers, as Parker won the Robert Rose Award for the AFL's Most Courageous Player. His season ended prematurely when he suffered a fractured fibula when had his right leg twist awkwardly in a tackle against Collingwood in round 20.

Parker made a strong comeback in 2016, being awarded the Brett Kirk Medal (best on ground in the Sydney Derby) in round three. He won the Most Courageous Player award for the second year running and polled second in the Brownlow Medal with 26 votes, only beaten by Patrick Dangerfield of the Geelong Cats. He was also rewarded with his first ever All Australian honours in a career best season.

Parker had a consistent year in 2017, averaging 25.4 disposals a game. After the Swans lost their first six games of the season, they would then only lose two of their last sixteen home-and-away matches. Parker's role in the Swans' form turnaround was particularly prominent, once again winning the Bob Skilton Medal.

Round 1, 2018, saw Parker kick a stunning goal from a bicycle kick that was shortlisted for the 2018 goal of the year.

Parker played in the Swans team that lost the 2024 Grand Final to Brisbane.

In October 2024, Parker signed a three year contract with the North Melbourne Football Club, to the end of 2027. In 2026, Parker transitioned to be a defender in the North Melbourne backline.

== Statistics ==
Updated to the end of round 22, 2026.

Legend
G	Goals	K	Kicks	D	Disposals	T	Tackles
B	Behinds	H	Handballs	M	Marks
#	Played in that season's premiership team

Season	Team	No.	Games	Totals							Averages (per game)							Votes
Season	Team	No.	Games	G	B	K	H	D	M	T	G	B	K	H	D	M	T	Votes
2011	Sydney	26	13	8	8	71	81	152	28	24	0.6	0.6	5.5	6.2	11.7	2.2	1.8	1
2012^{#}	Sydney	26	19	5	5	140	164	304	54	53	0.3	0.3	7.4	8.6	16.0	2.8	2.8	4
2013	Sydney	26	25	22	12	265	259	524	76	125	0.9	0.5	10.6	10.4	21.0	3.0	5.0	0
2014	Sydney	26	25	25	14	286	362	648	104	151	1.0	0.6	11.4	14.5	25.9	4.2	6.0	12
2015	Sydney	26	19	18	14	219	267	486	65	90	0.9	0.7	11.5	14.1	25.6	3.4	4.7	9
2016	Sydney	26	26	25	18	330	369	699	90	170	1.0	0.7	12.7	14.2	26.9	3.5	6.5	26
2017	Sydney	26	24	14	17	304	304	608	85	134	0.6	0.7	12.7	12.7	25.3	3.5	5.6	16
2018	Sydney	26	22	25	9	261	245	506	88	123	1.1	0.4	11.9	11.1	23.0	4.0	5.6	10
2019	Sydney	26	22	13	7	302	256	558	91	114	0.6	0.3	13.7	11.6	25.4	4.1	5.2	16
2020 (Note: The 2020 season was played with 17 home-and-away matches per team (down from 22) and 16-minute quarters with time on (down from 20-minute quarters with time on) due to the impact of the COVID-19 pandemic.)	Sydney	26	17	6	5	190	187	377	53	82	0.4	0.3	11.2	11.0	22.2	3.1	4.8	15
2021	Sydney	26	23	15	8	298	343	641	87	106	0.7	0.3	13.0	14.9	27.9	3.8	4.6	17
2022	Sydney	26	25	14	10	320	291	611	103	150	0.6	0.4	12.8	11.6	24.4	4.1	6.0	16
2023	Sydney	26	23	9	5	269	274	543	86	114	0.4	0.2	11.7	11.9	23.6	3.7	5.0	10
2024	Sydney	26	10	14	4	81	60	141	32	23	1.4	0.4	8.1	6.0	14.1	3.2	2.3	0
2025	North Melbourne	26	22	12	6	252	261	513	78	95	0.5	0.3	11.5	11.9	23.3	3.5	4.3	0
2026	North Melbourne	26	21	3	0	332	204	536	143	42	0.1	0.0	15.8	9.7	25.5	6.8	2.0	0
Career			336	228	142	3920	3927	7847	1263	1596	0.7	0.4	11.7	11.7	23.4	3.8	4.8	152

== Honours and achievements ==
Team

- AFL premiership player (Sydney): 2012
- 3× Minor Premiership (Sydney): 2014, 2016, 2024

Individual

- Sydney captain: 2019–2023
- 3× Bob Skilton Medal: 2014, 2017, 2021
- All-Australian team: 2016
- 2× Robert Rose Award (AFLPA Most Courageous Player): 2015, 2016
- 2× 22under22 team: 2016, 2017
- 5× Brett Kirk Medal: 2016 (round 12), 2020 (round 12), 2021 (round 18), 2022 (round 1), 2022 (round 20)
