= List of individual match awards in the Australian Football League =

In the Australian Football League, many teams contest trophies or individual awards on an annual or regular basis in individual premiership matches during the home-and-away season. Many of these awards honour a legend or legends of the competing clubs, or are used as part of events to support a charitable cause.

This list covers recurring trophies or awards in home-and-away matches of the AFL season. Not included are once-off awards, or awards presented in representative or finals matches.

== Australian Football League ==
First awarded	Club "A"	Club "B"	Team award	Individual award	Details
1965	Carlton	Melbourne	R. D. Barassi Trophy	—	Named in honour of Ron Barassi, Jr., who played with both clubs. The trophy was first presented in 1965, the year after Barassi transferred from Melbourne to Carlton.
1986	Melbourne	Richmond	Berry Street Cup	—	Contested in support of Berry Street, a children and family welfare organisation.
1993	Collingwood	Carlton	Peter Mac Cup	—	Played in support of the Peter MacCallum Cancer Centre. Once shared between the two clubs' home matches, but since 2009 always contested at Collingwood home games against Carlton.
1995	Essendon	Western Bulldogs	EJ Whitten Cup	—	Contested at each match between the teams. Named in honour of Footscray legend Ted Whitten.
1997	Adelaide	Port Adelaide	Showdown Trophy	Showdown Medal	Showdown: The best on ground award has been presented since 2000 to the best on ground Showdown matches. For Showdown XXXIX only, the medal was renamed the Phil Walsh Medal in honour of the late Port Adelaide assistant coach and Adelaide coach Phil Walsh, who was killed earlier in the month in which this particular Showdown took place.
1997	St Kilda	Western Bulldogs	Barker–Whitten Challenge Plate	—	Named in honour of club legends Trevor Barker (St Kilda) and Ted Whitten (Footscray) and established in 1997, shortly after the deaths from cancer of both men. The match is played in support of the Trevor Barker Foundation, the EJ Whitten Foundation and Challenge, all three of which are foundations supporting cancer research and patients.
1998	Carlton	Essendon	Madden Cup	—	Named in honour of brothers Simon Madden (378 games for Essendon) and Justin Madden (45 games for Essendon and 287 games for Carlton). Contested once per year, with home team alternating.
1999	Hawthorn	St Kilda	Blue Ribbon Cup	Silk–Miller Medal	Played in support of the Victorian Police Blue Ribbon Foundation. The matches are played, and the best on ground medal is named, in honour of police officers Gary Silk and Rodney Miller, who were killed in the line of duty in August 1998.
2000	Collingwood	Essendon	Perpetual ANZAC Day Trophy	Anzac Medal	Anzac Day clash: Awarded to the player displaying the most courage, skill, self-sacrifice and teamwork in the match between Essendon and Collingwood. First awarded in 2000, then later awarded retrospectively back to 1995. The Perpetual ANZAC Day Trophy has been awarded since 2000.
2000	Collingwood	Western Bulldogs	Robert Rose Cup	Bob Rose–Charlie Sutton Medal	Played in support of the Robert Rose Foundation, which supports Victorians with spinal cord injuries, and named in honour of former Collingwood and Footscray player Robert Rose, who was paralysed in a car accident. Since 2007, the Rose–Sutton medal is awarded to the player who displays the most courage, skill, leadership and sportsmanship in the match; this is named after Bob Rose (Robert's father, of Collingwood) and Charlie Sutton (Footscray), who were both known for these attributes.
2001	Fremantle	West Coast	RAC WA Trophy	Glendinning–Allan Medal	Western Derby: Best on ground medal has been presented since 2001 and was originally named the Ross Glendinning Medal, named solely after Western Australian footballer Ross Glendinning. In 2018 the medal was renamed the Glendinning–Allan Medal to recognise the inaugural captains of both clubs. The Western Derby Trophy is known as the RAC WA Trophy for sponsorship purposes.
2002	Sydney	Essendon (until 2013), Sir Doug Nicholls Round opponent (since 2014)	Marn Grook Trophy	—	Named in honour of the historical Aboriginal game Marn Grook, often considered to be an ancestor of modern Australian rules football.
2003	Carlton	Hawthorn	—	David Parkin Medal	Awarded to the best on ground in an annual match between the teams each season. Named in honour of former Hawthorn premiership player and premiership coach of both clubs David Parkin.
2003	Collingwood	North Melbourne	—	Jason McCartney Medal	Awarded to the player displaying the most courage and determination in a match between the teams each season. Named in honour of North Melbourne and Collingwood player Jason McCartney, who survived the 2002 Bali bombings. — Not awarded since 2013.
2004	Collingwood	Richmond	Jack Dyer–Lou Richards Trophy	—	Named in honour of club legends Jack Dyer (Richmond) and Lou Richards (Collingwood).
2004	Geelong	Western Bulldogs	Western Victoria Cup	—	Sponsored by Origin Energy.
2004	Port Adelaide	various	—	Peter Badcoe VC Medal	Awarded to the player displaying the most courage, teamwork and self-sacrifice in Port Adelaide's match during the Anzac Day Round. Named in honour of South Australian Vietnam War hero Major Peter Badcoe.
2004	Richmond	St Kilda	—	Ian Stewart Medal	Awarded to the best on ground in an annual match between the teams each season. Named in honour of former St Kilda and Richmond player Ian Stewart, who won Brownlow Medals and premierships with both clubs.
2005	Essendon	Richmond	Kevin Sheedy Cup	Yiooken Award	Dreamtime at the 'G: Named in honour of former Richmond player and then-Essendon coach Kevin Sheedy. The best on ground award, awarded since 2006, is named for the Woiwurrung word for 'dreaming'.
2006	Hawthorn	Geelong (2006–2012)	Beyond Blue Cup	—	Supporting and raising awareness for depression and anxiety through Beyond Blue Cup. Then-Hawthorn president Jeff Kennett was chairman of Beyond Blue at the time of the first contest.
2006	Hawthorn	various (2013–present)	Beyond Blue Cup	—	Supporting and raising awareness for depression and anxiety through Beyond Blue Cup. Then-Hawthorn president Jeff Kennett was chairman of Beyond Blue at the time of the first contest.
2006	Essendon	Melbourne (2006–2011)	—	—	Clash for Cancer match: (Note: No official awards as this is a charity focused match.); Supporting and raising awareness for children's cancer charity Challenge. Originally launched in 2006 following Adam Ramanauskas' cancer diagnosis in partnership with the Cancer Council of Victoria. Players wore yellow armbands for the match, which the AFL had formally denied, resulted in the club being fined AU$20,000. Since 2007 Essendon has incorporated yellow armbands into the left sleeve of the jumper, in agreement with AFL.
2006	Essendon	various (2012–present)	—	—	Clash for Cancer match: Supporting and raising awareness for children's cancer charity Challenge. Originally launched in 2006 following Adam Ramanauskas' cancer diagnosis in partnership with the Cancer Council of Victoria. Players wore yellow armbands for the match, which the AFL had formally denied, resulted in the club being fined AU$20,000. Since 2007 Essendon has incorporated yellow armbands into the left sleeve of the jumper, in agreement with AFL.
2008	Essendon	North Melbourne	—	Archer–Hird Medal	Awarded to the player displaying the most courage and determination in the first match between the teams each season. Named in honour of Glenn Archer (North Melbourne) and James Hird (Essendon), who were both known for their courage. — Not awarded since 2013.
2009	Carlton	Collingwood	Richard Pratt Cup	Richard Pratt Medal	Contested at Carlton home games against Collingwood. Played in support of the Pratt Foundation, and first played after the death in April 2009 of former Carlton president Richard Pratt. The Richard Pratt Medal, first presented in 2012, is awarded to the player adjudged best on ground between the two teams.
2009	Hawthorn	various	Alec Campbell Cup	Frank McDonald Medal	Cup named in honour of Australia's last surviving Gallipoli veteran Alec Campbell, and the best on ground medal named in honour of Australia's last surviving decorated World War I veteran Frank MacDonald. Both awards were originally contested during the early 2000s in Anzac Day round home matches by the Tasmania VFL team; since 2009, after Tasmania folded, Hawthorn has contested the cup annually on or around Anzac Day in a match in Tasmania.
2010	Adelaide	Collingwood	Westpac Community Cup	—	Played in support of a different community volunteer cause each year (past causes have included the Country Fire Authority and Surf Lifesavers of Victoria and South Australia.
2010	Sydney	West Coast	HMAS Sydney II Trophy	—	Named in honour of the World War II cruiser named HMAS Sydney which was sunk in battle in 1941.
2011	Brisbane Lions	Gold Coast	QClash Trophy	Marcus Ashcroft Medal	QClash: The award for the best on ground in all QClash matches is named in honour of Queensland native Marcus Ashcroft, who played with Brisbane and was an assistant coach at Gold Coast.
2012	Greater Western Sydney	Sydney	Lifeline Cup	Kirk–Ward Medal	Sydney Derby: Awarded to the winner of the Sydney Derby, currently sponsored by Lifeline Named in honour of former club captains Brett Kirk and Callan Ward.
2012	Greater Western Sydney	Western Bulldogs (2012–2013)	Prime Minister's Cup	—	Played at one of Greater Western Sydney's home matches in Canberra. The first two cups were played between GWS and Western Bulldogs – of which then-Prime Minister Julia Gillard was the number-one ticket holder – and the opponent has varied in fixtures since the end of Gillard's term.
2012	Greater Western Sydney	various (2014–present)	Prime Minister's Cup	—	Played at one of Greater Western Sydney's home matches in Canberra. The first two cups were played between GWS and Western Bulldogs – of which then-Prime Minister Julia Gillard was the number-one ticket holder – and the opponent has varied in fixtures since the end of Gillard's term.
2013	St Kilda	various	Simpson–Henderson Trophy	ANZAC Medal	New Zealand ANZAC Day clash: Awarded to the winning team of St Kilda's home match in Wellington, New Zealand on Anzac Day. Named in honour of Australian John Simpson Kirkpatrick and New Zealander Richard Alexander Henderson, both known for carrying wounded soldiers from World War I battlefields on donkeys. — Not awarded since 2015.
2015	Collingwood	Melbourne	—	Neale Daniher Trophy	King's Birthday clash: Awarded to the player adjudged best-on-ground during the annual match between the clubs. Named in honour of former Melbourne coach Neale Daniher.
2017	Essendon	Geelong	—	Tom Wills Award	Awarded to the player adjudged best-on-ground during the annual Country Game between the clubs. Named in honour of Australian football founder Tom Wills.
2025	Brisbane Lions	Carlton	—	Robert Walls Medal	Awarded to the player adjudged best-on-ground during games between the clubs. Named in honour of Robert Walls, who played for and coached Carlton and coached both of the Lions' predecessor teams, Fitzroy and the Brisbane Bears.
Club "A" & Club "B" are listed in alphabetical order, except when award is exclusive to the home fixtures of one club.

== AFL Women's ==
First awarded	Club "A"	Club "B"	Team award	Individual award	Details
2013	Melbourne	Western Bulldogs	Hampson–Hardeman Cup	—	Named after women football pioneers Barb Hampson and Lisa Hardeman, who developed the first women's championships in 1998.
2020	Brisbane	Gold Coast	QClash Trophy	QClash Medal	Awarded to the winner and best on ground in the QClash between the two Qld teams.
2020	Fremantle	West Coast	Women's Western Derby Trophy	Derby Medal	Awarded to the winner and best on ground in the Western Derby clash between the two WA teams.
2022	Adelaide	Port Adelaide	Showdown Plate	Showdown Medal	Awarded to the winner and best on ground in the Showdown clash between the two SA teams.
Club "A" & Club "B" are listed in alphabetical order, except when award is exclusive to the home fixtures of one club.

== See also ==
- Rivalries in the Australian Football League
