= Sydney Derby (AFL) =

Australian rules football local derby match

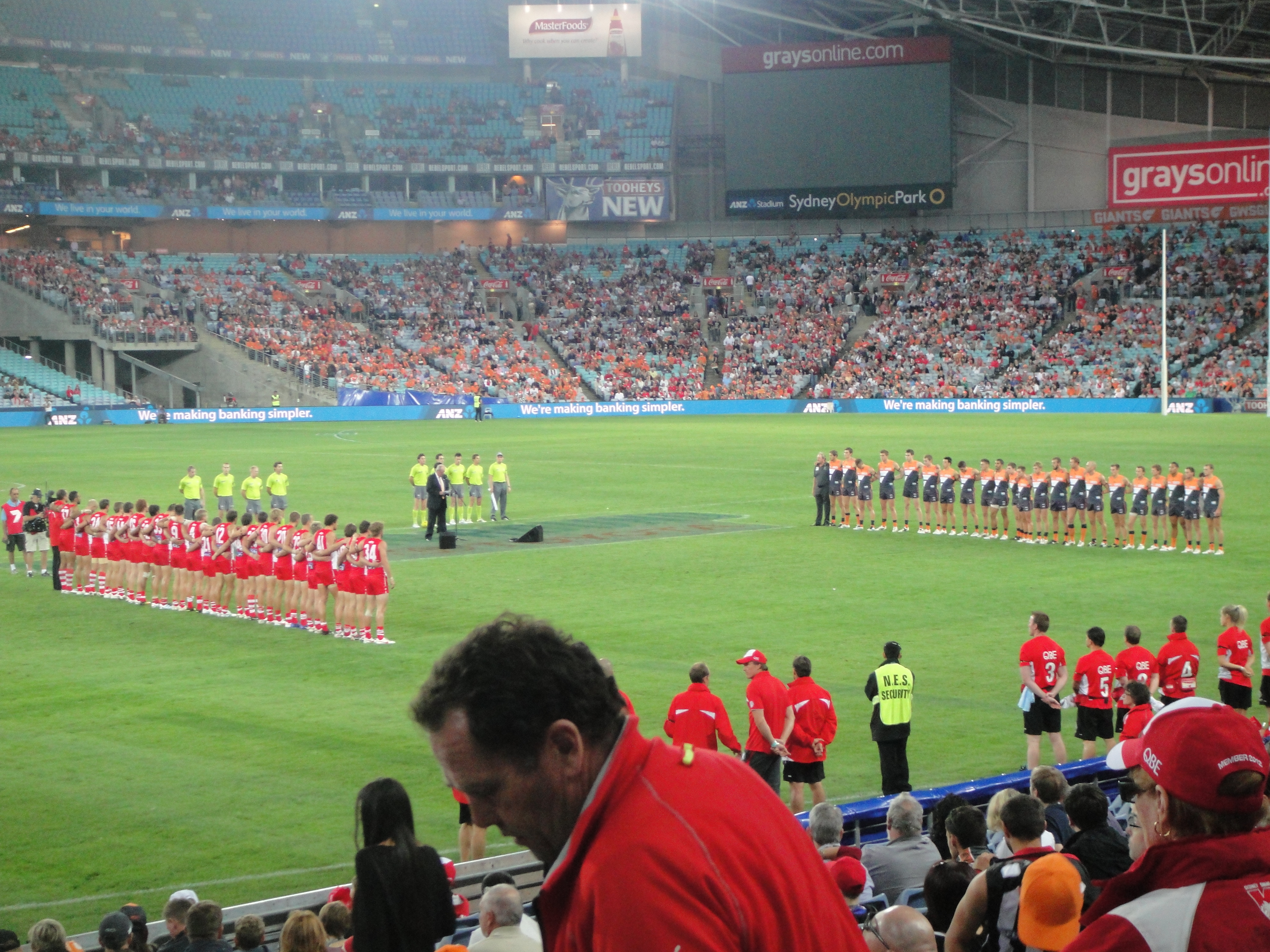
- Pre-game at Sydney Derby I

- Sydney Swans GWS Giants
- First meeting: 24 March 2012 (GWS 37–100 Sydney)
- Latest meeting: 17 April 2026 (Sydney 107-66 GSW)
- Next meeting: 25 July 2026
- Trophy: Lifeline Cup

Statistics
- Total meetings: 32
- All-time series (AFL only): Sydney 21 wins GWS 11 wins
- Postseason results: GWS 3 wins Sydney 1 win
- Largest victory: Sydney – 129 points 14 July 2013
- Longest win streak: Sydney, 5; 05 August 2023–04 May 2025
- Current win streak: Sydney, 1; 17 April 2026–present

The Sydney Derby, is an Australian rules football local derby match between the two Sydney-based Australian Football League (AFL) clubs, the Sydney Swans and the Greater Western Sydney Giants (also known as the GWS Giants or GWS). As of Round 6 of the 2026 AFL season, the head-to-head score is in favour of the Sydney Swans with 21 wins to 11; the teams have also met four times in finals matches, with GWS winning three finals to Sydney's one.

The fixture was formerly known by the title "Battle of the Bridge," which was coined by inaugural Greater Western Sydney coach Kevin Sheedy. The bridge in question was intended to be the Anzac Bridge which links the Sydney CBD to the Inner West. However, it was often mistakenly understood to be the world-famous Sydney Harbour Bridge which joins the city centre to North Sydney. Due to this ambiguity, former Swans captain Kieren Jack noted in a 2021 interview that the clubs ultimately "settled" on the term "Sydney Derby". While the original term persists in the media, it is no longer used officially.

== History ==
The Sydney Cricket Ground as seen during the 2018 second elimination final (Sydney Derby XVI)

The first Sydney Derby was held on 24 March 2012, serving as the Giants' first AFL premiership match in its inaugural season and the opening match of the 2012 season. Fielding a very young and inexperienced team, the Giants only won three games in their first two years in the competition and failed to win any derby games.

The Giants won their first derby in the opening clash of 2014. Later that year, The Daily Telegraph noted there was "genuine dislike off the field" between the clubs. Over the subsequent years, the Giants progressively moved up the AFL ladder and got closer to the Swans, who were premiership contenders during this time. The opening derby of 2015 attracted a crowd of over 30,000, the since the first derby. With both teams vying for a top-four spot at the end of the season, Derby X in 2016 was described as a blockbuster. In the lead up to the game, The Daily Telegraph published an article analysing the rivalry. Though noting that Sydney's surprise recruitment of Lance Franklin created some animosity between the clubs, the article went on to say, "What the rivalry needs is a flash point. ... Something to make it clear that when the Swans and Giants meet there is real feeling. Not the slightly awkward yet mutually respectful détente that currently exists." After the game, the paper declared that an altercation between Steve Johnson and Lance Franklin "was the moment of sporting theatre that inspired a rivalry to truly ignite". It was the first AFL game at Sydney Showground Stadium to be declared a sell-out.

The first finals series match between the teams was on 10 September 2016, when the Swans hosted the Giants in the 1st qualifying final of the 2016 season. The Giants defeated the Swans by 36 points, an historic victory considering it was the Giants' first win in a finals series match and was played before a record derby crowd of 60,222. The two teams met again in a finals match in the 2018 second elimination final. The Giants registered their biggest-ever victory over the Swans, winning by 49 points in front of a crowd of 40,350.

In August 2020, the two teams contested a Sydney Derby at Optus Stadium in Perth, due to concerns over a second wave of coronavirus cases in Sydney, while Sydney's outbreak in July 2021 saw that month's fixture moved first to Mars Stadium in Ballarat, then to Metricon Stadium following a COVID-19 outbreak in Victoria.

The two teams met in a Sydney Derby final for the third time in 2021, with that match taking place at University of Tasmania Stadium in Launceston, Tasmania. In front of a crowd of 8,635, the Giants defeated the Swans by 1 point, the narrowest winning margin in the derby's history.

== Venues ==
The two venues usually used for the Sydney Derby are the Sydney Cricket Ground for Swans home games and Sydney Showground Stadium for Giants home games. The first three Sydney Derbies and the 2016 finals series derby were held at Stadium Australia. During the COVID-19 pandemic, three Sydney Derbies were played at neutral grounds: Optus Stadium in Perth, Metricon Stadium in Gold Coast, University of Tasmania Stadium in Launceston.

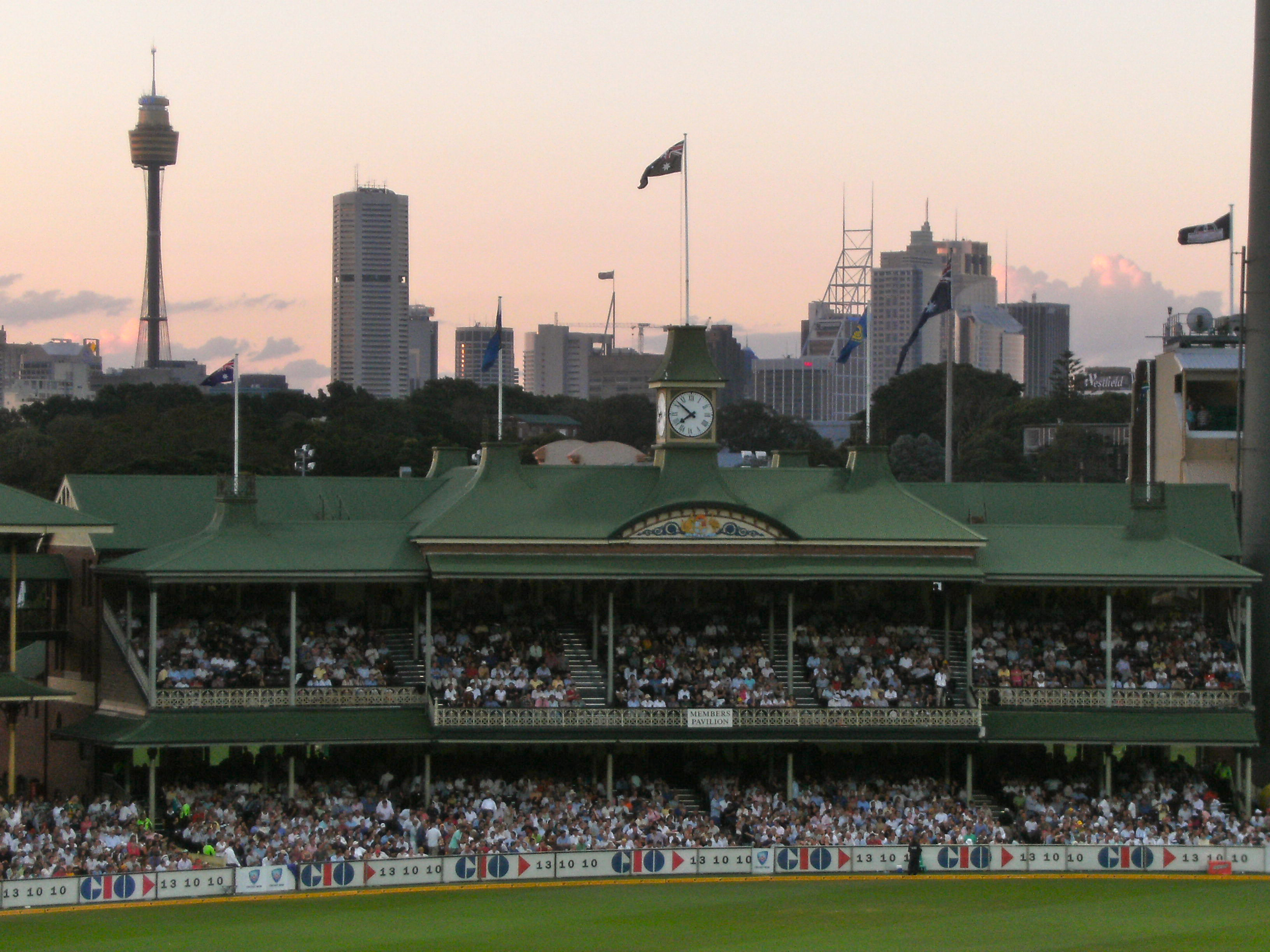
Sydney Cricket Ground
(Sydney Swans)

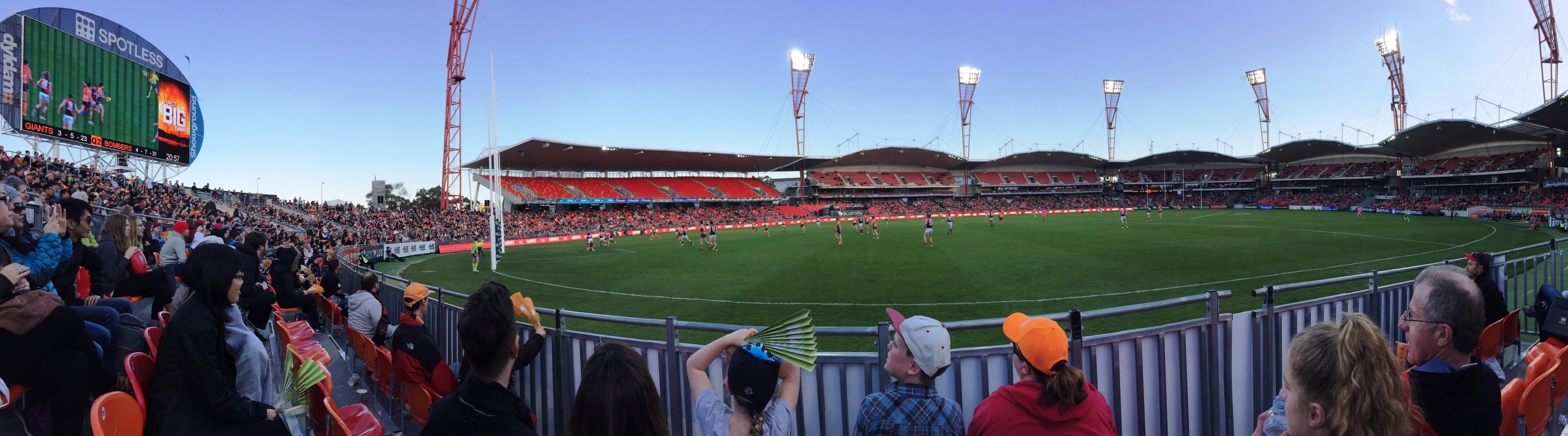
Sydney Showground Stadium
(GWS Giants)

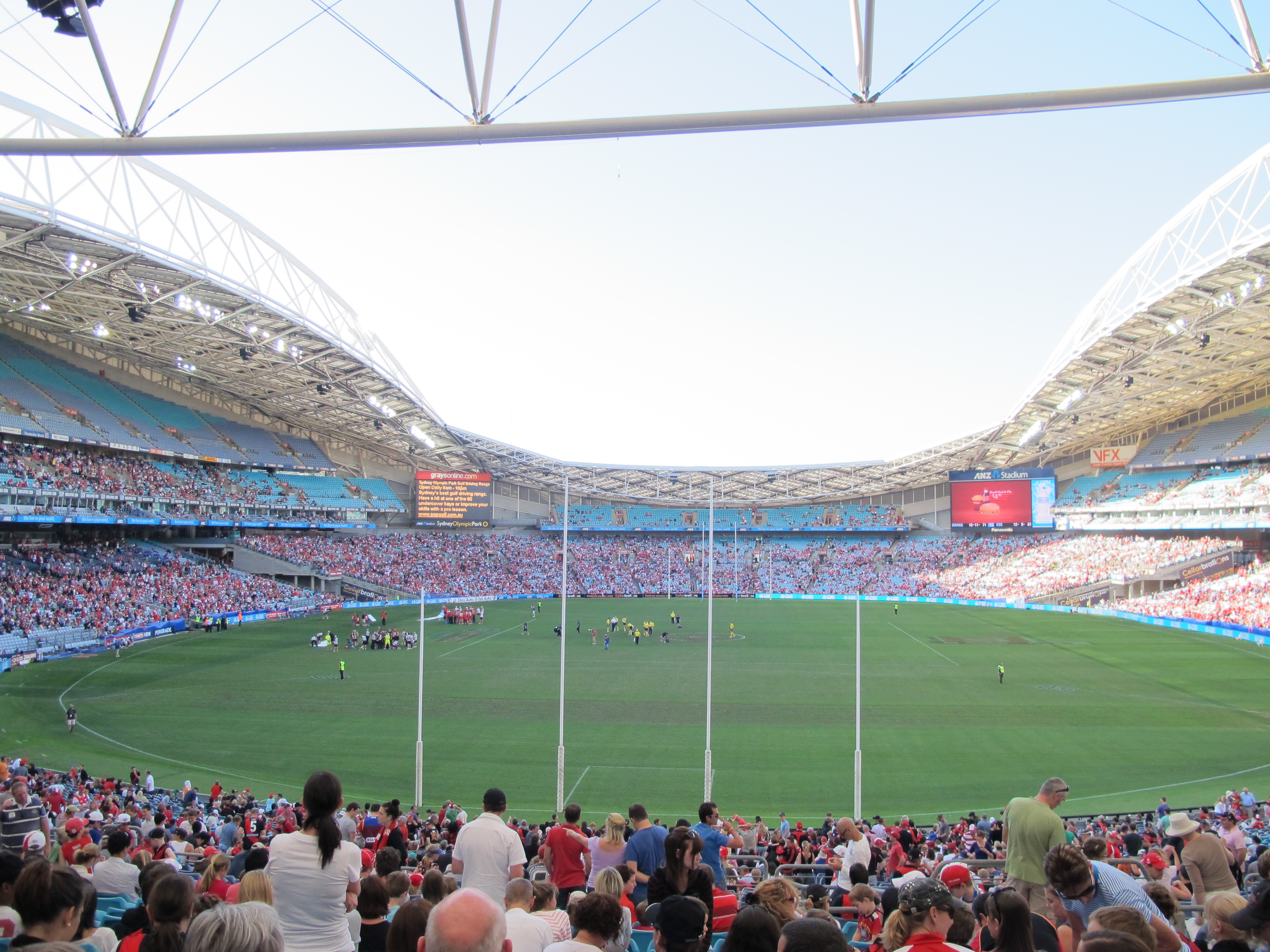
Stadium Australia

== Results ==
	Year	Date	Rd	Home Team	Score	Away Team	Score	Ground	Crowd	Result/Winner	M	H2H
I	2012	24/03	1	GWS	5.7 (37)	Sydney	14.16 (100)	Stadium Australia	38,203	Sydney	63	+1
II	2012	30/06	14	Sydney	19.18 (132)	GWS	5.8 (38)	Stadium Australia	22,565	Sydney	94	+2
III	2013	30/03	1	GWS	11.10 (76)	Sydney	16.10 (106)	Stadium Australia	23,690	Sydney	30	+3
IV	2013	14/07	16	Sydney	24.27 (171)	GWS	5.12 (42)	Sydney Cricket Ground	21,757	Sydney	129	+4
V	2014	15/03	1	GWS	15.9 (99)	Sydney	9.13 (67)	Sydney Showground Stadium	17,102	GWS	32	+3
VI	2014	28/06	15	Sydney	15.16 (106)	GWS	8.12 (60)	Sydney Cricket Ground	27,778	Sydney	46	+4
VII	2015	18/04	3	Sydney	16.15 (111)	GWS	12.18 (90)	Sydney Cricket Ground	31,966	Sydney	21	+5
VIII	2015	22/08	21	GWS	6.8 (44)	Sydney	20.13 (133)	Sydney Showground Stadium	19,507	Sydney	89	+6
IX	2016	09/04	3	Sydney	14.9 (93)	GWS	10.8 (68)	Sydney Cricket Ground	37,045	Sydney	25	+7
X	2016	12/06	12	GWS	15.15 (105)	Sydney	9.9 (63)	Sydney Showground Stadium	21,541	GWS	42	+6
XI	2016	10/09	QF	Sydney	7.13 (55)	GWS	12.19 (91)	Stadium Australia	60,222	GWS	36	+5
XII	2017	22/04	5	Sydney	9.9 (63)	GWS	15.15 (105)	Sydney Cricket Ground	34,824	GWS	42	+4
XIII	2017	15/07	17	GWS	12.11 (83)	Sydney	14.12 (96)	Sydney Showground Stadium	21,924	Sydney	13	+5
XIV	2018	07/04	3	Sydney	16.7 (103)	GWS	12.15 (87)	Sydney Cricket Ground	34,711	Sydney	16	+6
XV	2018	18/08	22	GWS	8.12 (60)	Sydney	11.14 (80)	Sydney Showground Stadium	21,433	Sydney	20	+7
XVI	2018	08/09	EF	Sydney	4.6 (30)	GWS	10.19 (79)	Sydney Cricket Ground	40,350	GWS	49	+6
XVII	2019	27/04	6	Sydney	12.7 (79)	GWS	18.12 (120)	Sydney Cricket Ground	29,780	GWS	41	+5
XVIII	2019	03/08	20	GWS	12.11 (83)	Sydney	12.9 (81)	Sydney Showground Stadium	16,116	GWS	2	+4
XIX	2020	13/08	12	Sydney	10.6 (66)	GWS	3.7 (25)	Perth Stadium	6,464^{[a]}	Sydney	41	+5
XX	2021	17/04	5	Sydney	10.9 (69)	GWS	9.17 (71)	Sydney Cricket Ground	33,541	GWS	2	+4
XXI	2021	18/07	18	GWS	11.6 (72)	Sydney	15.8 (98)	Carrara Stadium	2,374^{[a]}	Sydney	26	+5
XXII	2021	28/08	EF	Sydney	10.13 (73)	GWS	11.8 (74)	York Park	8,635	GWS	1	+4
XXIII	2022	19/03	1	GWS	13.14 (92)	Sydney	17.10 (112)	Stadium Australia	25,572	Sydney	20	+5
XXIV	2022	30/07	20	Sydney	17.10 (112)	GWS	5.9 (39)	Sydney Cricket Ground	31,916	Sydney	73	+6
XXV	2023	29/04	7	Sydney	16.10 (106)	GWS	17.5 (107)	Sydney Cricket Ground	31,615	GWS	1	+5
XXVI	2023	05/08	21	GWS	12.13 (85)	Sydney	15.6 (96)	Sydney Showground Stadium	19,332	Sydney	11	+6
XXVII	2024	04/05	8	Sydney	14.14 (98)	GWS	10.9 (69)	Sydney Cricket Ground	40,337	Sydney	29	+7
XXVIII	2024	22/06	15	GWS	11.9 (75)	Sydney	15.12 (102)	Sydney Showground Stadium	19,751	Sydney	27	+8
XXIX	2024	07/09	QF	Sydney	13.10 (88)	GWS	12.10 (82)	Sydney Cricket Ground	43,189	Sydney	6	+9
XXX	2025	03/05	8	Sydney	12.15 (87)	GWS	10.13 (73)	Sydney Cricket Ground	39,260	Sydney	14	+10
XXXI	2025	25/07	20	GWS	15.12 (102)	Sydney	8.10 (58)	Sydney Showground Stadium	18,536	GWS	44	+9
XXXII	2026	17/04	6	Sydney	17.5 (107)	GWS	8.18 (66)	Sydney Cricket Ground	43,986	Sydney	41	+10
XXXIII	2026	25/07	20	GWS	13.10 (88)	Sydney	21.13 (139)	Sydney Showground Stadium	20,141	Sydney	51	+11

Source: Click here

^{a} Crowds impacted by COVID-19

== Kirk–Ward Medal ==
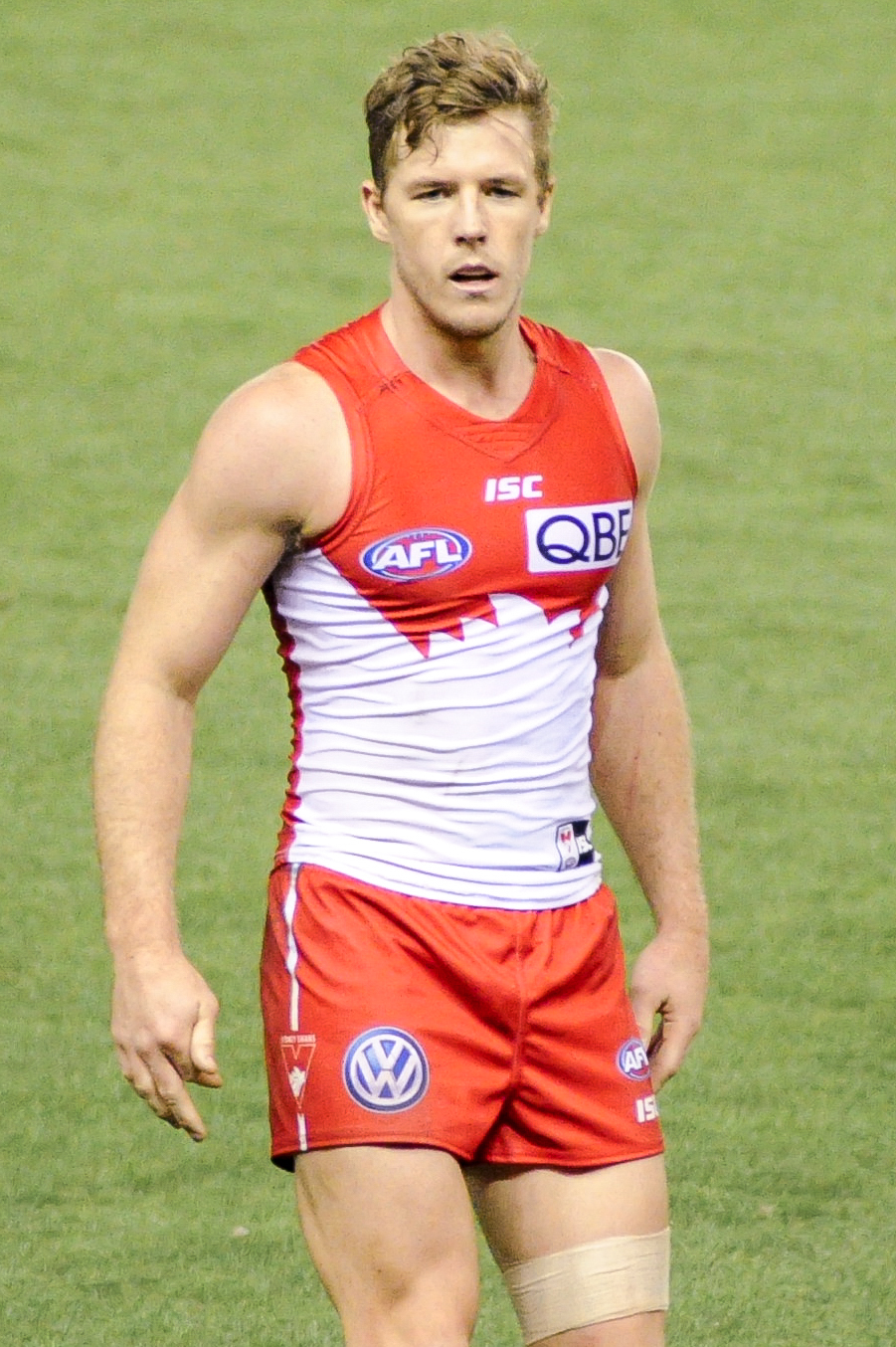
Former Sydney Swans captain Luke Parker holds the record for most medals (5)

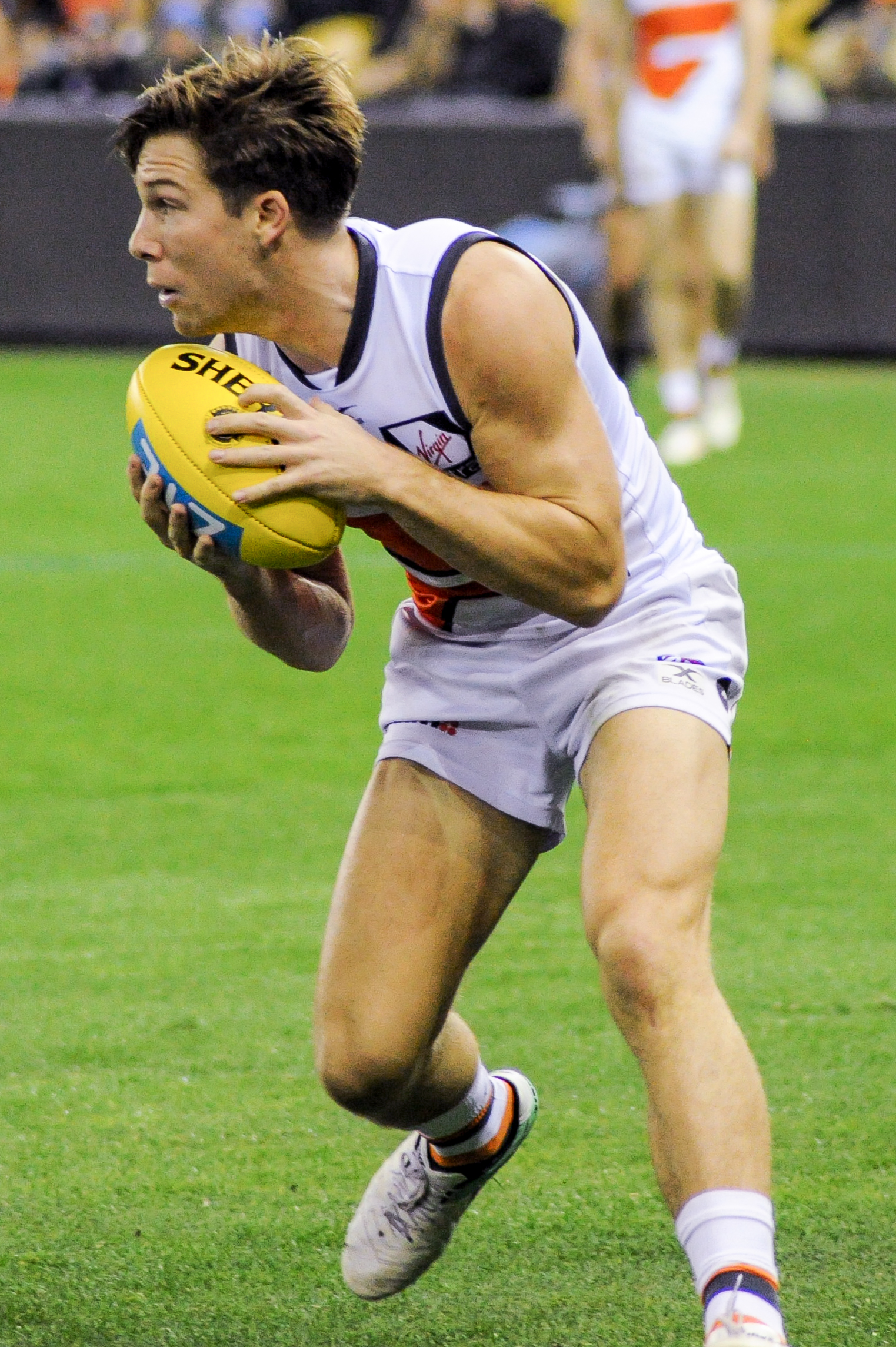
Current GWS Giants captain Toby Greene won the medal in round 7, 2023

The Kirk–Ward Medal is awarded to the player deemed to be the best player on the ground after the match. It is named after Sydney Swans AFL premiership player Brett Kirk, who was born and raised in country New South Wales and played junior football for North Albury. It is also named after inaugural GWS Giants player Callan Ward, who won the club's first Kevin Sheedy medal in 2012 and was a long serving co-captain at GWS between 2012 and 2019. The award was previously known as the Brett Kirk Medal prior to 2026.

== Statistics ==
Below are listed statistics from the Sydney Derby only.

=== Team statistics ===
==== Highest scores ====
Club	Round	Goals	Behinds	Total
Sydney	2013, Round 16	24	27	171
Sydney	2026, Round 20	21	13	139
Sydney	2015, Round 21	20	13	133
Sydney	2012, Round 14	19	18	132
GWS	2019, Round 6	18	12	120

==== Lowest scores ====
Club	Round	Goals	Behinds	Total
GWS	2020, Round 12	3	7	25
Sydney	2018, Elimination Final	4	6	30
GWS	2012, Round 1	5	7	37
GWS	2012, Round 14	5	8	38
GWS	2022, Round 20	5	9	39

==== Biggest wins ====
Club	Round	Winning score	Losing score	Margin
Sydney	2013, Round 16	24.27 (171)	5.12 (42)	129
Sydney	2012, Round 14	19.18 (132)	5.8 (38)	94
Sydney	2015, Round 21	20.13 (133)	6.8 (44)	89
Sydney	2022, Round 20	17.10 (112)	5.9 (39)	73
Sydney	2012, Round 1	14.16 (100)	5.7 (37)	63

==== Smallest wins ====
Club	Round	Winning score	Losing score	Margin
GWS	2023, Round 7	17.5 (107)	16.10 (106)	1
GWS	2021, Elimination Final	11.8 (74)	10.13 (73)	1
GWS	2019, Round 20	12.11 (83)	12.9 (81)	2
GWS	2021, Round 5	9.17 (71)	10.9 (69)	2
Sydney	2024, Qualifying Final	13.10 (88)	12.10 (82)	6

=== Player statistics ===
Players highlighted in green are still on AFL lists for either Sydney or Greater Western Sydney. Updated to Round 20, 2026.

==== Scores in one game ====
Player	Club	Date	Goals	Behinds
Lance Franklin	Sydney	2015, Round 3	5	5
Lance Franklin	Sydney	2018, Round 22	5	4
Lance Franklin	Sydney	2014, Round 15	5	3
Kurt Tippett	Sydney	2015, Round 21	5	3
Luke Parker	Sydney	2022, Round 1	5	1
Lance Franklin	Sydney	2021, Round 5	5	0

==== Goal total ====
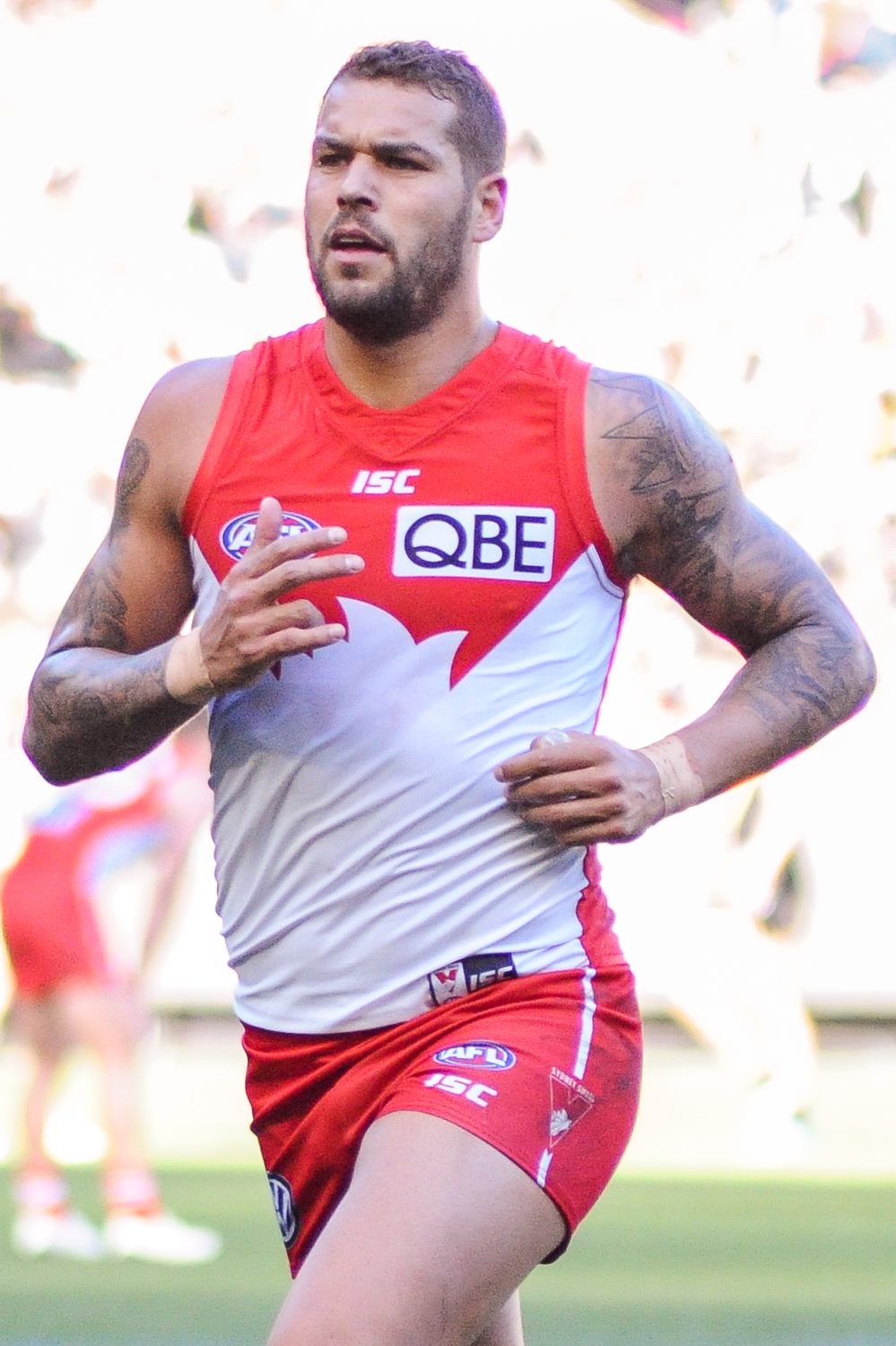
Lance Franklin has kicked the most goals for Sydney in Sydney Derby history (50).

Player	Club	Goals	Behinds	Accuracy	Games	Goals/Game
Lance Franklin	Sydney	50	32	60.2%	17	2.94
Toby Greene	GWS	37	38	49.3%	25	1.48
Tom Papley	Sydney	35	21	62.5%	22	1.59
Jeremy Cameron	GWS	33	23	58.2%	16	2.13
Isaac Heeney	Sydney	31	16	67.4%	25	1.24

==== Disposals in one game ====
Player	Club	Date	Disposals
Errol Gulden	Sydney	2024, Round 15	41
Errol Gulden	Sydney	2026, Round 20	41
Tom Green	GWS	2023, Round 21	38
Jarrad McVeigh	Sydney	2012, Round 14	37
Lachie Whitfield	GWS	2015, Round 3	37
Clayton Oliver	GWS	2026, Round 6	37

==== Derbies played ====
Player	Club	Games
Lachie Whitfield	GWS	28
Callan Ward	GWS	27
Jake Lloyd	Sydney	27
Toby Greene	GWS	25
Luke Parker	Sydney	25
Dane Rampe	Sydney	25

==== Brownlow votes ====
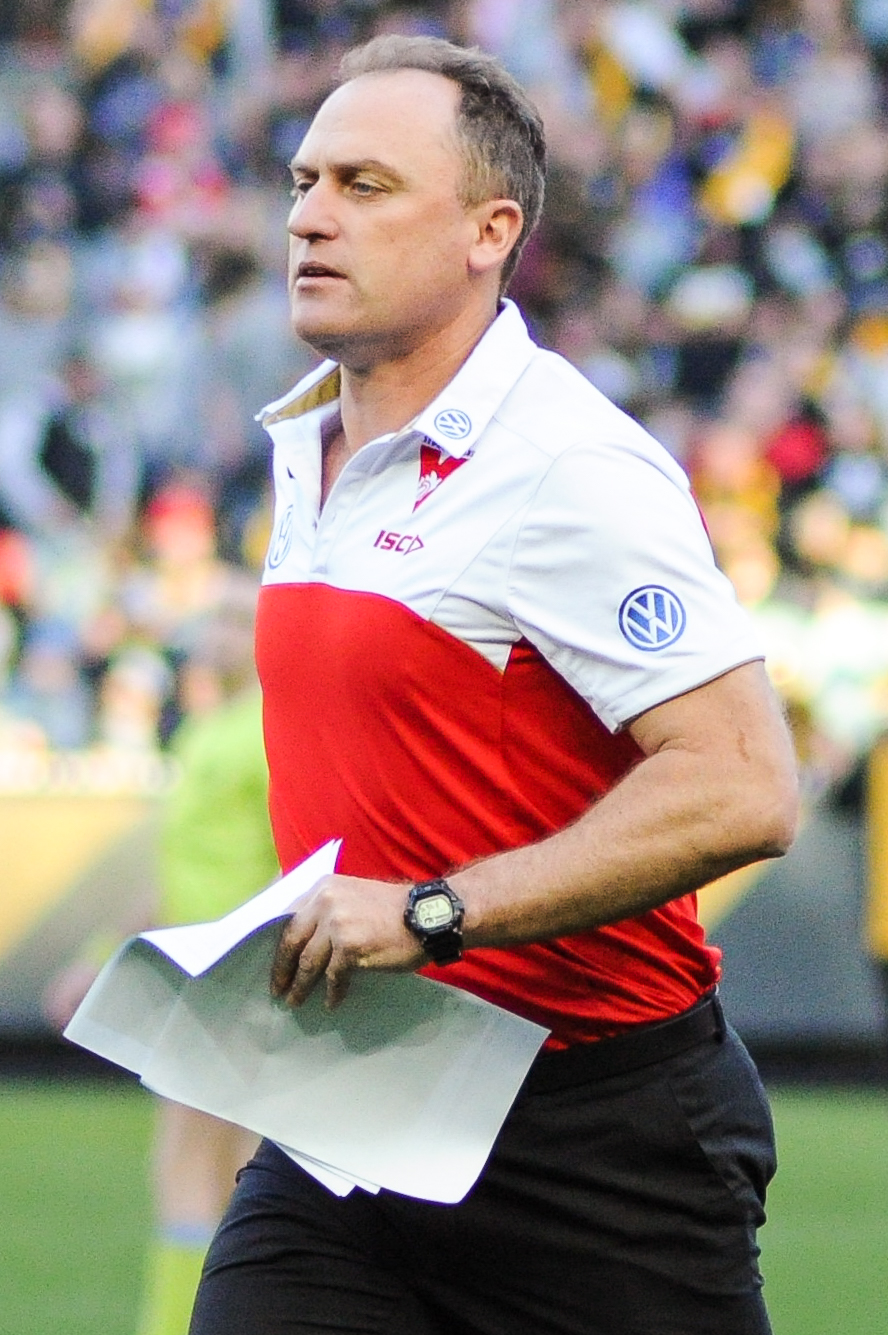
New South Wales native and AFL Premiership player/coach John Longmire holds the best winning percentage of any coach in Sydney Derby history (68.75%).

Brownlow Votes as of the end of the 2023 AFL season.

Player	Club	Votes	H&A	Average
Luke Parker	Sydney	19	24	0.79
Josh Kennedy	Sydney	16	22	0.73
Lance Franklin	Sydney	15	17	0.88
Shane Mumford	GWS & Sydney	8	16	0.5
Kieran Jack	Sydney	7	16	0.44

=== Coach statistics ===
Coaches highlighted in green are the current head coach for either Sydney or Greater Western Sydney.

Coach	Club	Years	Total	Wins	Losses	Percent
John Longmire	Sydney	2012–2024	24	17	7	70.83%
Leon Cameron	GWS	2014–2022	15	7	8	46.66%
Adam Kingsley	GWS	2023–	5	1	4	20.00%
Kevin Sheedy	GWS	2012–2013	4	0	4	0.00%
Mark McVeigh	GWS	2022	1	0	1	0.00%

== Results (AFL Women's) ==
Greater Western Sydney and Sydney also each compete in the AFL Women's competition, Greater Western Sydney having joined the inaugural competition, and Sydney joining in 2022 (S7). The following Sydney Derbies have since been played in the AFL Women's competition.

Year	Date	Round	Home team	Away team	Score	Winner	Venue	Attendance (Note: Attendances listed in bold were official sell-outs.)
S7 (2022)	10 September 2022	3	Sydney	GWS	18 - 65	GWS	SCG	4,223
2023	3 September 2023	1	Sydney	GWS	51 - 46	Sydney	North Sydney Oval	5,474

== See also ==
- Showdown
- QClash
- Western Derby
