= Shane Mumford =

Australian rules footballer

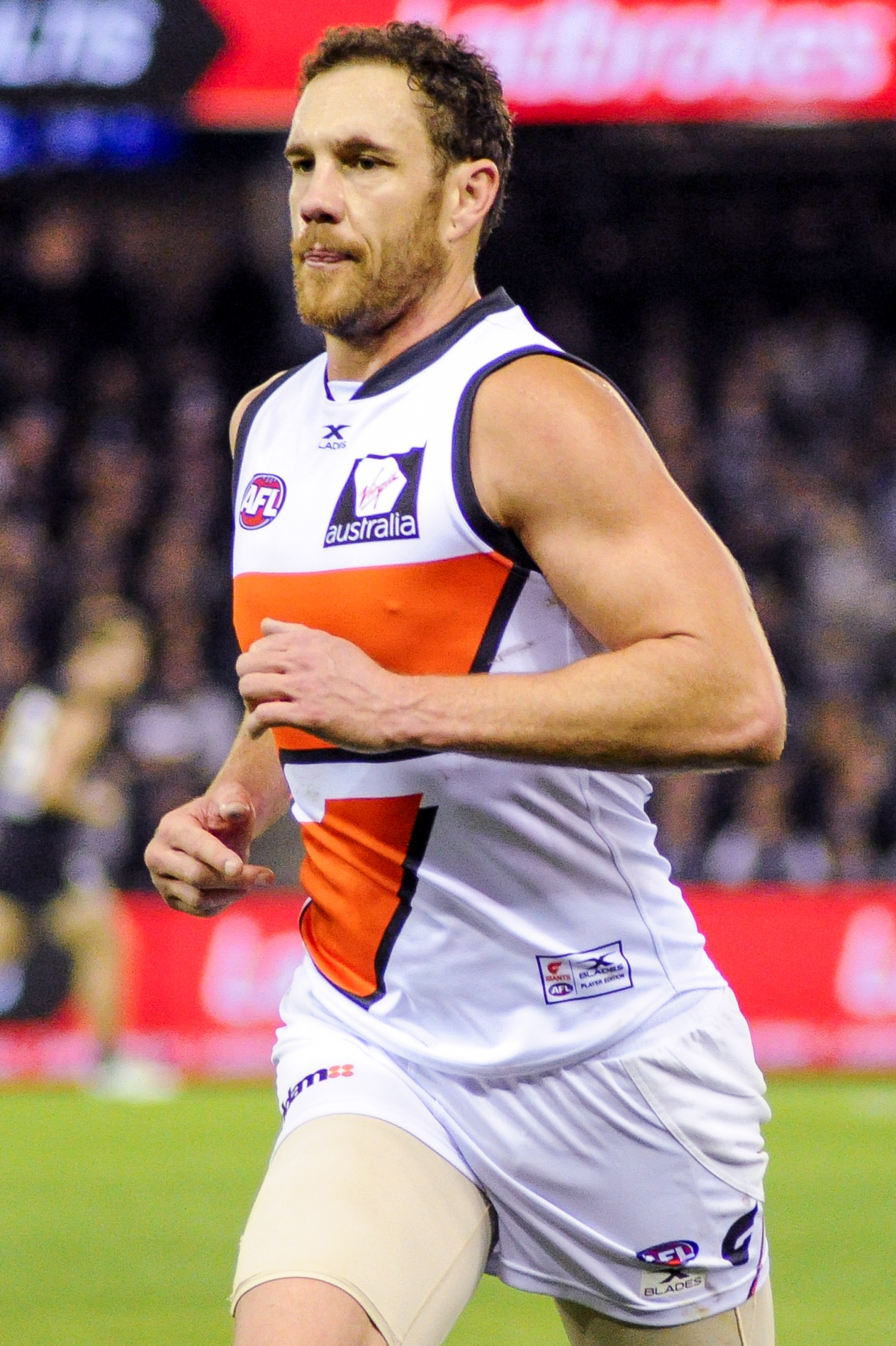
- Mumford playing for Greater Western Sydney in June 2017

Personal information
- Full name: Shane Mumford
- Nicknames: Sausage, Mummy
- Born: 5 July 1986 (age 40)
- Original team: Bunyip (EDFL)
- Draft: No. 57, 2008 rookie draft
- Height: 199 cm (6 ft 6 in)
- Weight: 108 kg (238 lb)
- Position: Ruckman

Playing career^{1}
Years	Club	Games (Goals)
2008–2009	Geelong	21 (3)
2010–2013	Sydney	79 (36)
2014–2017, 2019–2021	Greater Western Sydney	116 (18)
Total		216 (57)
- ^{1} Playing statistics correct to the end of 2021.

Career highlights
- AFL premiership player: 2012; Kevin Sheedy Medal: 2014; Brett Kirk Medal: 2017

Shane Mumford (born 5 July 1986) is a former professional Australian rules footballer who most recently played for the Greater Western Sydney Giants in the Australian Football League (AFL). He has also previously played for the Geelong Football Club and the Sydney Swans. He was a part of Sydney's 2012 premiership team.

== Early career ==
In 2006, Mumford was the recipient of the Bunyip Football Club best and fairest award, as well as being the runner-up for the Ellinbank & District Football League medal. After being made aware of his abilities by Geelong VFL player Jason Davenport, who was also in the AFL side as a rookie, Geelong's VFL side welcomed Mumford into their ranks for the 2007 season. It became quite a disappointing season for Mumford, only playing in six games for the premiership winning side, (being replaced by Steven King for the VFL Grand Final, and then the next week, Steven King replaced Mark Blake in the 2007 AFL Grand Final), but his pure rucking ability won over the Geelong recruiters, who then drafted him with their last pick (57) in the 2007 Rookie Draft.

== AFL career ==
=== Geelong (2008–2009) ===
After being drafted, Mumford showed up to pre-season training having re-invented himself, losing 20 kg and improving his fitness levels. Mumford was elevated from Geelong's rookie list on 23 April 2008, due to long-term injury of Matthew Egan, and was then immediately named to play in his first match in round 6 - the following weekend. He replaced fellow ruckman Trent West to take part in Geelong's one-point win over Fremantle at Subiaco.

After a good season in 2009, where he was replaced in the side by ruckman Mark Blake towards the end of the year, Mumford accepted a deal from the Sydney Swans which saw him move to the Harbour City on a three-year million dollar deal (which was extended to four years).

Overall, Mumford played in 18 of 22 regular season matches and was overlooked for the 2009 AFL Grand Final, which was won by the Cats.

=== Sydney (2010–2013) ===
The Swans had high expectations of Mumford following Mark Seaby's injury. During 2010 the Swans were impressed with Mumford's improvement considering in 2009 he was only a Geelong Rookie. Mumford was named in the 44-man squad from which All-Australian selection would be made but narrowly missed out when the actual team of 22 was chosen. Mumford finished second in the 2010 Sydney Swans Bob Skilton Medal, 9 votes behind Kieren Jack.

Mumford was suspended for two weeks in his return to Geelong in round 7 following a spear tackle on Gary Ablett Jr., in a match Sydney lost by 67 points. Mumford again got into trouble for a similar tackle against Carlton in round 16, but no tribunal action was taken.

Mumford returned against Hawthorn in round 10, being one of the Swans' best players as they lost by just two points, despite outscoring the Hawks by 11 goals to 10. His best game for the Swans came against Essendon the week after, with a season-high 46 hitouts against the Bombers whose ruckman David Hille was injured in the same match.

Mumford injured his knee in the Swans' round 21 win over the Western Bulldogs and as a result missed the round 22 win over the Brisbane Lions.

At the end of the 2010 season Shane Mumford was third in the AFL for hitouts despite missing three matches due to suspension and a knee injury.

Another strong start to the year set Mumford up for a successful 2nd season at the Swans in 2011. Unfortunately injury and suspension didn't allow him to have as good a year as in 2010 when he finished runner up in the Bob Skilton Medal. He still managed to finish 8th in the 2011 count however, underlining his importance to the side and the quality and consistency of his play when he is fit.

Mumford played his 100th AFL game in the Sydney Swans' preliminary final loss to Fremantle on 21 September 2013. Coincidentally, his first AFL game was against the same club and he opposed the same ruckman, Aaron Sandilands.

=== Greater Western Sydney (2014–2017, 2019–2021) ===
Mumford moved across to Greater Western Sydney (GWS) prior to the commencement of the 2014 AFL season, after he was forced out of the Swans due to their acquisition of Lance Franklin during the 2013/14 off-season. He debuted for the club against his old side in round 1, 2014, and despite missing five matches early in the season due to a knee injury, he won the club's best and fairest award at the end of an improved season for the club.

After both Mumford and the Giants had a strong start to the season in 2015, the ruckman suffered a serious ankle injury against Collingwood at the Melbourne Cricket Ground in round 11. The injury ended his season.

Mumford returned from his ankle injury in the Giants' season-opening loss to Melbourne at the MCG on 26 March. In round two against Geelong, Mumford pulled off what could possibly be "the greatest AFL hit of all time" when he took out Mitch Duncan with a solid shirtfront in the third quarter. Despite the nature of the hit, it later went unpunished by the Match Review Panel. At the conclusion of the 2017 season, he retired from AFL football. In 2018, Mumford took the position of ruck coach with GWS before coming out of retirement as a supplemental selection. In 2019, he played a total of 20 games for GWS during the home and away season and all finals matches, including the Grand Final loss to Richmond.

== Personal life ==
Mumford is married to Eva Konta, the sister of British tennis player Johanna Konta. The pair have three children.

== Post AFL ==
After retiring, Shane became a ruck coach and an ambassador at the GWS Giants.

On 21 October 2018, video emerged of Mumford snorting a white substance, believed to be cocaine. GWS released a statement saying they would support Shane and treat the issue as a health problem. GWS stated the events occurred when Mumford succumbed to a season ending injury in 2015.

== Statistics ==
Statistics are correct to the end of 2021

Legend
G	Goals	K	Kicks	D	Disposals	T	Tackles
B	Behinds	H	Handballs	M	Marks	H/O	Hit-outs
#	Played in that season's premiership team

Season	Team	No.	Games	Totals								Averages (per game)								Votes
Season	Team	No.	Games	G	B	K	H	D	M	T	H/O	G	B	K	H	D	M	T	H/O	Votes
2008	Geelong	41	3	0	0	5	11	16	3	1	31	0.0	0.0	1.7	3.7	5.3	1.0	0.3	10.3	0
2009	Geelong	41	18	3	1	35	127	162	37	71	256	0.2	0.1	1.9	7.1	9.0	2.1	3.9	14.2	0
2010	Sydney	41	21	4	3	75	186	261	45	101	535	0.2	0.1	3.6	8.9	12.4	2.1	4.8	25.5	5
2011	Sydney	41	19	11	2	90	147	237	64	94	662	0.6	0.1	4.7	7.7	12.5	3.4	4.9	34.8	4
2012^{#}	Sydney	41	17	12	4	60	115	175	52	75	459	0.7	0.2	3.5	6.8	10.3	3.1	4.4	27.0	2
2013	Sydney	41	22	9	8	67	178	245	58	95	581	0.4	0.4	3.0	8.1	11.1	2.6	4.3	26.4	5
2014	Greater Western Sydney	41	16	4	2	55	150	205	33	93	618	0.3	0.1	3.4	9.4	12.8	2.1	5.8	36.4	8
2015	Greater Western Sydney	41	11	1	3	31	102	133	25	71	423	0.1	0.3	2.8	9.3	12.1	2.3	6.5	38.5	3
2016	Greater Western Sydney	41	23	3	2	47	208	255	54	133	799	0.1	0.1	2.0	9.0	11.1	2.4	5.8	34.7	4
2017	Greater Western Sydney	41	21	5	1	48	171	219	33	117	802	0.2	0.1	2.3	8.1	10.4	1.6	5.6	38.2	2
2019	Greater Western Sydney	41	20	0	3	58	132	190	26	84	618	0.0	0.2	2.9	6.6	9.5	1.3	4.2	30.9	0
2020	Greater Western Sydney	41	10	1	0	14	66	80	11	34	204	0.1	0.0	1.4	6.6	8.0	1.1	3.4	20.4	0
2021	Greater Western Sydney	41	14	4	0	44	98	142	19	68	364	0.3	0.0	3.1	7.0	10.1	1.4	4.9	26.0	0
Career			216	57	29	632	1699	2331	465	1043	6352	0.3	0.1	2.9	7.9	10.8	2.2	4.8	29.4	33
