= Kevin Sheedy Medal =

Australian rules football player award

The Kevin Sheedy Medal is the award given to the Greater Western Sydney Giants player determined to have been the "best and fairest" throughout an AFL season. The award is named after the club's inaugural coach, Kevin Sheedy. The inaugural winner of the award was Callan Ward, one of the club's first captains.

== Recipients ==
Denotes current player

Season	Player(s)	Ref
2012	Callan Ward	
2013	Jeremy Cameron	
2014	Shane Mumford	
2015	Heath Shaw	
2016	Toby Greene	
2017	Josh Kelly	
2018	Lachie Whitfield	
2019	Tim Taranto	
2020	Nick Haynes	
2020	Lachie Whitfield (2)	
2021	Josh Kelly (2)	
2022	Sam Taylor	
2023	Toby Greene (2)	
2024	Jesse Hogan	
2025	Tom Green	
2026	Lachie Ash	

== Multiple winners ==
Player	Medals	Seasons
Josh Kelly	2	2017, 2021
Lachie Whitfield	2	2018, 2020
Toby Greene	2	2016, 2023
