= Callan Ward =

Australian rules footballer (born 1990)

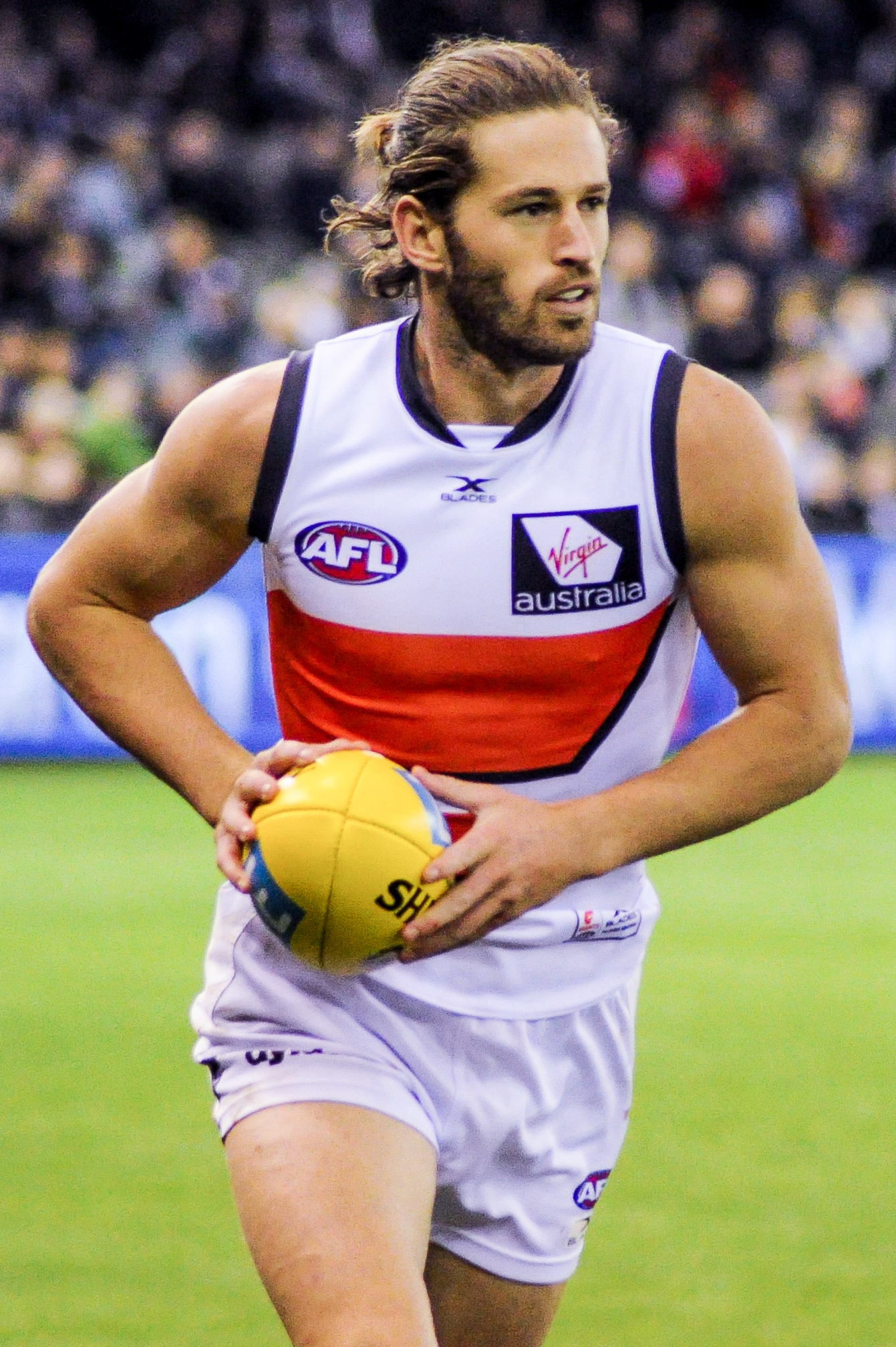
- Ward playing for Greater Western Sydney in 2017

Personal information
- Full name: Callan Ward
- Born: 10 April 1990 (age 36)
- Original team: Western Jets (TAC Cup)
- Draft: No. 19, 2007 national draft
- Debut: Round 11, 2008, Western Bulldogs vs. St Kilda, at Telstra Dome
- Height: 187 cm (6 ft 2 in)
- Weight: 83 kg (183 lb)
- Position: Midfielder

Playing career
Years	Club	Games (Goals)
2008–2011	Western Bulldogs	60 (33)
2012–2025	Greater Western Sydney	267 (130)
Total		327 (163)

International team honours
Years	Team	Games (Goals)
2011	Australia	2 (0)

Career highlights
- Greater Western Sydney co-captain: 2012–2019; Greater Western Sydney equal games record holder; Kevin Sheedy Medal: 2012; Robert Rose Award: 2018; 2× Brett Kirk Medal: 2014 (game 1), 2017 (game 2); AFL Rising Star nominee: 2009

Callan Ward (born 10 April 1990) is a former professional Australian rules footballer who played for the Western Bulldogs and Greater Western Sydney Giants in the Australian Football League (AFL). Ward was the inaugural Kevin Sheedy Medallist in 2012. He was one of three inaugural Greater Western Sydney co-captains, leading the club for eight seasons, and is the club's equal games record holder with 267 games. In 2026, the Brett Kirk Medal for best afield in the Sydney Derby, which Ward won twice during his career, was renamed the Kirk–Ward Medal.

== Early life ==
Ward is the grandson of former South Melbourne captain Bill Gunn, who played 104 games for the club between 1952 and 1959. He grew up in the Melbourne suburb of Spotswood and played junior football for Spotswood Football Club in the Western Region Football League. Leading into the 2007 AFL draft, five player managers vied to represent him, and a week out from the draft he decided on Paul Connors, who also represented Chris Judd. Ward was selected by the Bulldogs with their second selection (number 19 overall) after being a mere 20 days old enough to nominate for the draft.

== AFL career ==
=== Western Bulldogs (2008–2011) ===
Ward made his debut against St Kilda in round 11 of the 2008 season, collecting 12 disposals and finishing with one goal. In his debut year, he played six games while juggling full-time football and his last year of high school. Having earned a regular spot in the team in 2009, Ward went on to have a breakout season, playing 22 games and earning an AFL Rising Star nomination for his performance against Fremantle in round 18. Ward missed the first half of the 2010 season through injury, but returned to play the rest of the season and finals series. Ward had his best season for the Bulldogs in 2011, playing in all 22 games and averaging 21 disposals, including a 29-disposal, best-on-ground performance against Adelaide in round 13.

=== Greater Western Sydney (2012–2025) ===
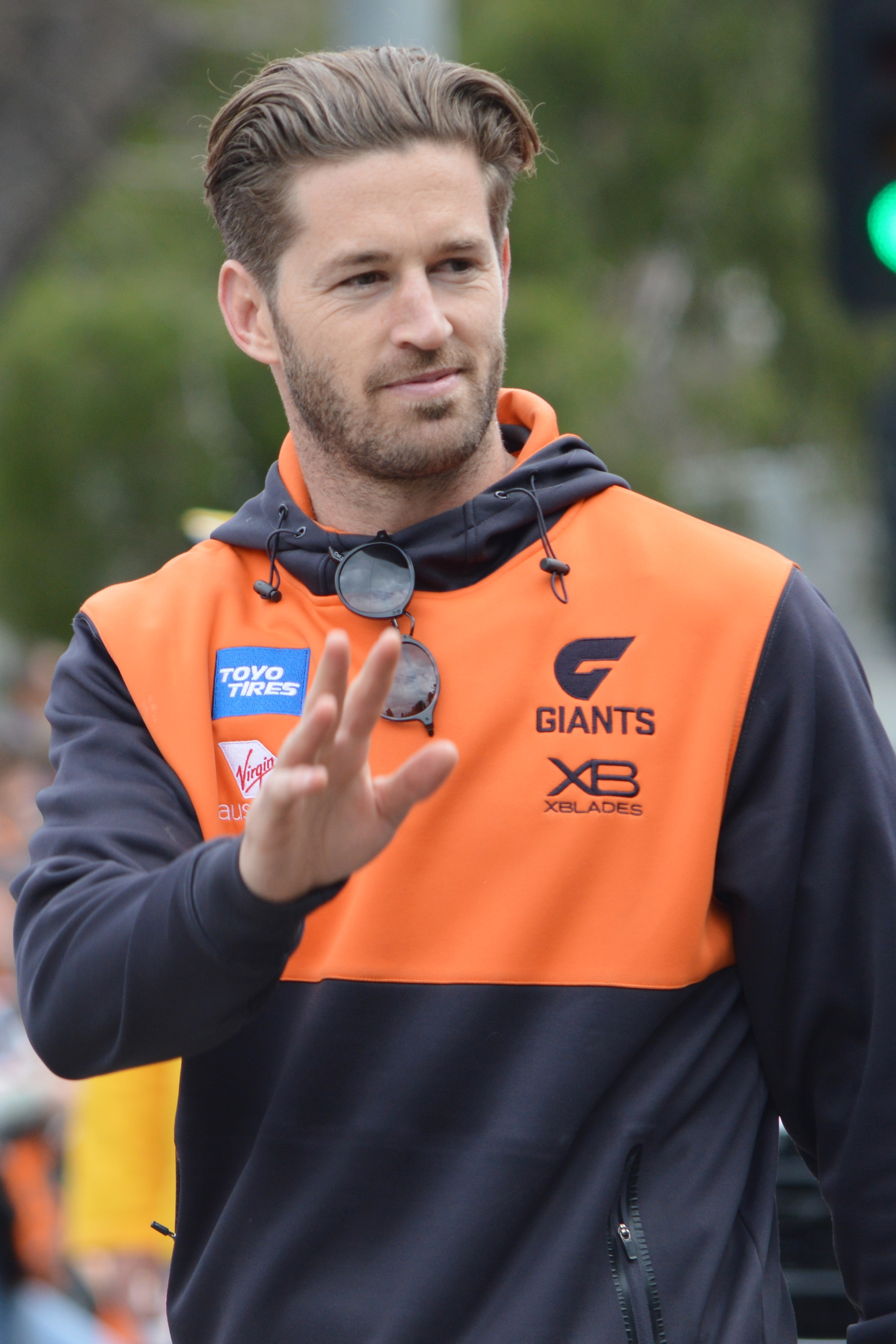
Ward at the 2019 AFL Grand Final parade

On 5 September 2011, Ward announced that he had signed with the Greater Western Sydney Giants; he was the second player to publicly announce his commitment to the new franchise club. Ward was also announced as one of three inaugural co-captains for the club, alongside Phil Davis and Luke Power. On 24 March 2012, in the Giants' debut AFL match against Sydney, he kicked the Giants' first ever goal. Ward went on to win the Giants' inaugural best-and-fairest award, named the Kevin Sheedy Medal after their coach, Kevin Sheedy.

Ward enjoyed a solid season in 2013, despite the club winning only one game for the year; Ward was named best-on-ground for his 31 disposals and four goals in that game, against Melbourne. Ward followed up with another consistent season in 2014, in which he polled fifteen Brownlow Medal votes. This included four best-on-ground performances, two of which were narrow seven-point losses to St Kilda and Hawthorn.

Ward had a career-best season in 2015, playing all 22 games and averaging 25 disposals, and polling a club-record nineteen Brownlow votes. Ward had another consistent season in 2016, during which the Giants made finals for the first time, securing their first finals win against Sydney, and fell six points short of making the Grand Final after losing to Ward's former club, the Western Bulldogs. Ward played all 25 games the following season, averaging 27 disposals.

In 2018, Ward played his 200th game in round 8 against West Coast, and played his 150th game for the Giants (becoming the first player to do so) in round 19 against St Kilda. Ward sustained a knee injury during the 2019 pre-season, meaning that he would miss the first few rounds of the season and his consecutive games streak would end at 95 games. He returned against Geelong in round 4; however, five minutes into the game, he suffered an anterior cruciate ligament injury, ruling him out for the rest of the season. He later began assisting Giants coach Leon Cameron on the interchange bench during matches while recovering from his injury. In December 2019, Stephen Coniglio took over the captaincy of the Giants from Ward and Davis.

Ward made a successful return from injury in round 2 of the 2020 season against North Melbourne. He missed the round 5 match against Hawthorn due to soreness, before suffering a right knee injury upon his return against Port Adelaide the following week.

In round 12, 2025, in what was widely considered to likely be Ward's final season, Ward ruptured his Anterior cruciate ligament (ACL) in the opening minutes against Richmond at Sydney Showground Stadium. Having been carried off in tears, Ward addressed his teammates in the three quarter time huddle, inspiring them to a comeback victory from 28 points behind in the final quarter. Following the season-ending injury, Ward announced his retirement from AFL football in August 2025.

== Statistics ==
Legend
G	Goals	K	Kicks	D	Disposals	T	Tackles
B	Behinds	H	Handballs	M	Marks

Season	Team	No.	Games	Totals							Averages (per game)							Votes
Season	Team	No.	Games	G	B	K	H	D	M	T	G	B	K	H	D	M	T	Votes
2008	Western Bulldogs	14	6	2	0	28	32	60	18	10	0.3	0.0	4.7	5.3	10.0	3.0	1.7	0
2009	Western Bulldogs	14	22	18	13	178	184	362	70	86	0.8	0.6	8.1	8.4	16.5	3.2	3.9	0
2010	Western Bulldogs	14	10	1	4	76	97	173	36	34	0.1	0.4	7.6	9.7	17.3	3.6	3.4	0
2011	Western Bulldogs	14	22	12	11	204	253	457	74	96	0.5	0.5	9.3	11.5	20.8	3.4	4.4	6
2012	Greater Western Sydney	8	20	8	11	278	210	488	86	100	0.4	0.6	13.9	10.5	24.4	4.3	5.0	5
2013	Greater Western Sydney	8	21	11	6	247	242	489	95	94	0.5	0.3	11.8	11.5	23.3	4.5	4.5	4
2014	Greater Western Sydney	8	20	7	10	240	258	498	75	115	0.4	0.5	12.0	12.9	24.9	3.8	5.8	15
2015	Greater Western Sydney	8	22	10	7	253	303	556	103	115	0.5	0.3	11.5	13.8	25.3	4.7	5.2	19
2016	Greater Western Sydney	8	24	16	12	272	287	559	82	109	0.7	0.5	11.3	12.0	23.3	3.4	4.5	12
2017	Greater Western Sydney	8	25	14	10	354	324	678	90	98	0.6	0.4	14.2	13.0	27.1	3.6	3.9	11
2018	Greater Western Sydney	8	24	8	15	318	324	642	92	95	0.3	0.6	13.3	13.5	26.8	3.8	4.0	13
2019	Greater Western Sydney	8	1	0	0	1	0	1	0	0	0.0	0.0	1.0	0.0	1.0	0.0	0.0	0
2020 (Note: The 2020 season was played with 17 home-and-away matches per team (down from 22) and 16-minute quarters with time on (down from 20-minute quarters with time on) due to the impact of the COVID-19 pandemic.)	Greater Western Sydney	8	7	3	1	56	48	104	16	11	0.4	0.1	8.0	6.9	14.9	2.3	1.6	0
2021	Greater Western Sydney	8	24	15	5	278	267	545	90	71	0.6	0.2	11.6	11.1	22.7	3.8	3.0	8
2022	Greater Western Sydney	8	22	8	7	247	230	477	103	58	0.4	0.3	11.2	10.5	21.7	4.7	2.6	1
2023	Greater Western Sydney	8	25	11	12	243	248	491	71	70	0.4	0.5	9.7	9.9	19.6	2.8	2.8	3
2024	Greater Western Sydney	8	20	13	2	193	175	368	87	54	0.7	0.1	9.7	8.8	18.4	4.4	2.7	0
2025	Greater Western Sydney	8	12	6	2	90	91	181	42	12	0.5	0.2	7.5	7.6	15.1	3.5	1.0	0
Career			327	163	128	3556	3573	7129	1230	1228	0.5	0.4	10.9	10.9	21.8	3.8	3.8	97

== Honours and achievements ==
Team

- NAB Cup (Western Bulldogs): 2010

Individual

- Greater Western Sydney Giants co-captain: 2012–2019
- Greater Western Sydney games record holder
- Kevin Sheedy Medal: 2012
- Robert Rose Award: 2018
- 2× Brett Kirk Medal: 2014 (game 1), 2017 (game 2)
- Australia representative honours in international rules football: 2011
- AFL Rising Star nominee: 2009
