= Noah Balta =

Australian rules football player (born 1999)

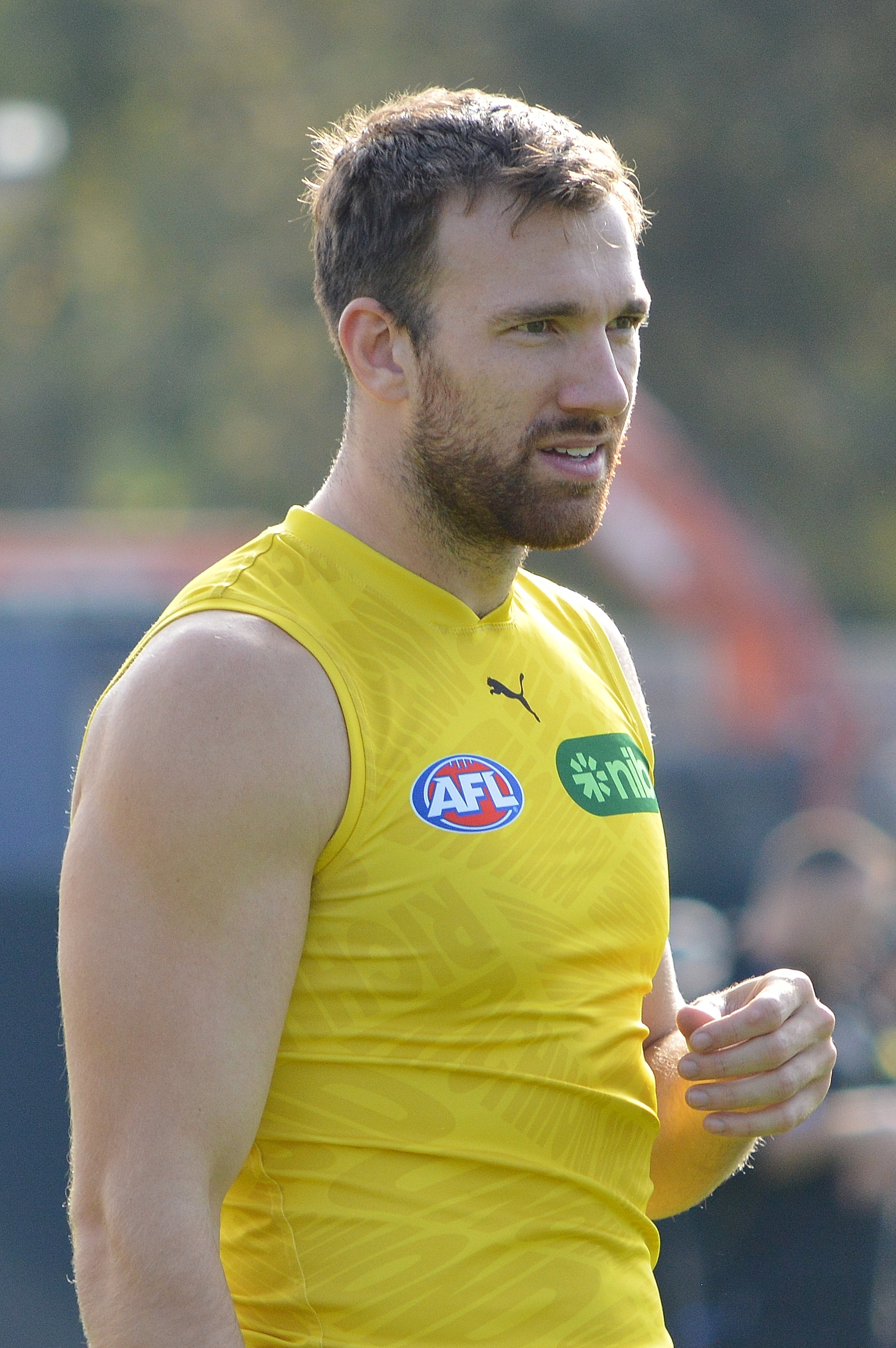
- Balta in May 2026

Personal information
- Born: 23 October 1999 (age 27)
- Original team: Calder Cannons (TAC Cup)
- Draft: No. 25, 2017 AFL national draft
- Debut: Round 1, 2019, Richmond vs. Carlton, at MCG
- Height: 194 cm (6 ft 4 in)
- Weight: 100 kg (220 lb)
- Position: Key defender

Club information
- Current club: Richmond
- Number: 21

Playing career^{1}
Years	Club	Games (Goals)
2018–	Richmond	134 (52)
- ^{1} Playing statistics correct to the end of 2026.

Career highlights
- AFL premiership player: 2020; 22 Under 22 team: 2020

Noah Balta (born 23 October 1999) is a professional Australian rules footballer playing for the Richmond Football Club in the Australian Football League (AFL). He was drafted by Richmond with the 25th pick in the 2017 AFL national draft and made his debut for the club in round 1 of the 2019 season. In 2019 he was a VFL premiership player while playing reserves grade football for Richmond and in 2020 he became an AFL premiership player with Richmond.

== Early life and junior football ==
Balta grew up in St Albans, a suburb 15 kilometres north-west of Melbourne. He was a junior soccer player at St Albans Dinamo and Melbourne Knights. He also participated in the Auskick program at St Bernard's College Essendon before playing at under 10 level with the Essendon Doutta Stars Football Club in the junior ranks of the Essendon District Football League.

In 2014, Balta began training with the Calder Cannons junior development squad and in 2015 he played alongside fellow future AFL player Cam Rayner in an EDFL under 16s premiership with the Doutta Stars.

In 2016, he played sporadically with the Calder Cannons in the TAC Cup and made a local football debut at age 16 with the Doutta Stars' senior EDFL team in July. At the end of that year, Balta participated in an under 17s All-Star match, played on the MCG as a curtain-raiser to that year's AFL grand final.

In the summer of 2016/17, Balta participated in the AFL Academy program. As part of the program, he and 35 other highly rated draft prospects completed interstate and international training camps and spent two weeks training with an AFL club, with Balta spending his time at Essendon. He returned to TAC Cup football with Calder in 2017, playing primarily as a key forward. In June and July of that year Balta stepped away from state junior football to represent Vic Metro at the 2017 AFL Under 18 Championships where he was part of the tournament-winning side. Despite previously playing as a forward, Balta played exclusively as a defender at the tournament. Upon his return from the national championships Balta immediately recorded a best on ground performance for Calder that included 31 disposals, 10 inside 50s and four score assists while playing a multi-positional role that included stints in the ruck. It was at that time that AFL Media draft expert Callum Twomey upgraded him five spots to the 19th best prospect in the forthcoming draft. He finished the season by kicking multiple goals in four of his final eight matches despite being trialed in defence and the midfield during the closing stages of the season. Over the TAC Cup season he held averages of 15 disposals and 4.3 marks per match.

Balta attended and played football for St. Bernard College in Essendon, where he was part of the Herald Sun Shield-winning team in 2017.

=== AFL recruitment ===
Despite a minor knee injury that kept him from participating in some tests at the national draft combine in October 2017, Balta still managed top-ten results in both the standing and running vertical jump tests. He also ran the two kilometre time trial in six minutes and 50 seconds and recorded a 8.38 on the agility test. Following those results, ESPN draft expert Christopher Doerre labelled Balta the fifth best prospect available at the 2017 AFL draft. At the same time, Fox Footy had him ranked 17th. Pre-draft he was noted for his positional versatility, contested marking ability and long-kicking. In the days immediately prior to the draft, Draft Central projected him as a 15-35 draft selection while AFL Media left him out of their projected top 30.

=== Junior statistics ===
Legend
G	Goals	K	Kicks	D	Disposals	T	Tackles
B	Behinds	H	Handballs	M	Marks

TAC Cup

Season	Team	No.	Games	Totals							Averages (per game)						
Season	Team	No.	Games	G	B	K	H	D	M	T	G	B	K	H	D	M	T
2016	Calder Cannons	12	7	16	—	64	20	84	24	21	2.3	—	9.1	2.9	12.0	3.4	3.0
2017	Calder Cannons	12	13	12	—	150	45	195	56	50	0.9	—	11.5	3.5	15.0	4.3	3.8
Career			20	28	—	214	65	279	80	56	1.4	—	10.7	3.3	14.0	4.0	2.8

Under 18 National Championships

Season	Team	No.	Games	Totals							Averages (per game)						
Season	Team	No.	Games	G	B	K	H	D	M	T	G	B	K	H	D	M	T
2017	Vic Metro	28	3	0	—	23	4	27	9	4	0.0	—	7.7	1.3	9.0	3.0	1.3
Career			3	0	—	23	4	27	9	4	0.0	—	7.7	1.3	9.0	3.0	1.3

== AFL career ==
=== 2018 season ===
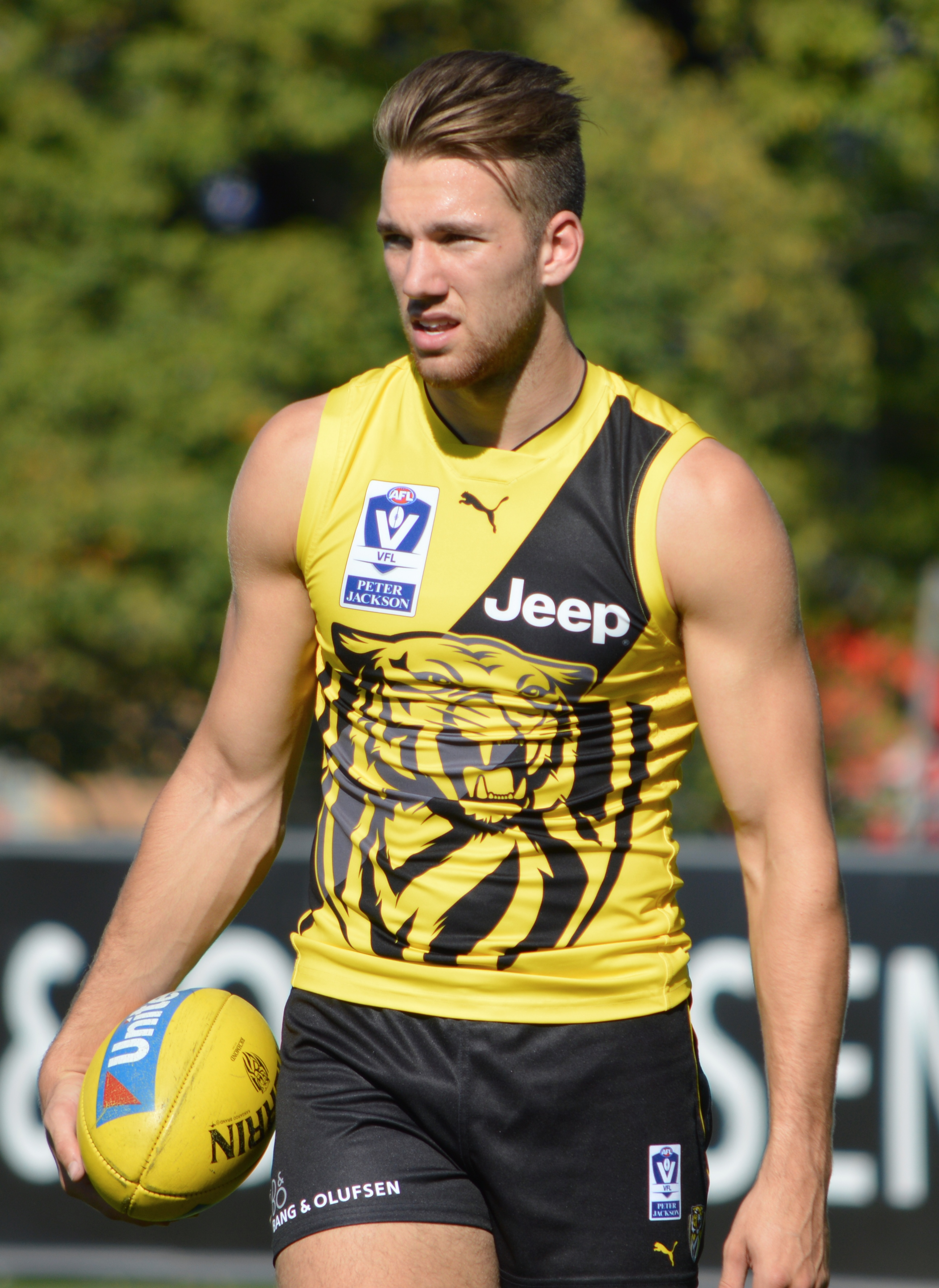
Balta with Richmond's VFL team, March 2018

Balta was drafted by Richmond with the club's third pick and the 25th selection overall in the 2017 AFL national draft.

He spent the early stages of his first pre-season training as a forward, but did so on a highly limited program due to general soreness. Balta made his first appearance for Richmond when he represented the club in a series of AFLX exhibition matches in Sydney in February 2018. He began playing with the club's reserves side in VFL matches in March and kicked a goal while playing as a forward in his first match. Within three weeks he had switched role to begin playing as a defender and in April, Balta turned in what Richmond reserves coach Craig McRae labelled "an outstanding performance" in that role, contributing 23 disposals, six marks and eight rebound 50s in a win over Port Melbourne. Over the next two months of play, Balta switched regularly between roles as a forward, ruck and defender, including within individual matches. In June he was trialed for stints in the ruck, while competing predominately as a forward. Balta suffered a corked hamstring in early August and missed one VFL match as a result. After finishing as minor premiers, Richmond's reserves side lined up a home qualifying final against Williamstown in which Balta featured as a midfielder and as a forward. After a loss in that match, Richmond's reserves side suffered a knock-out loss the following week which saw the team and Balta's season come to a close. Despite showing promising signs at stages during the year, Balta finished 2018 having failed to earn an AFL debut and instead played 18 games and kicked 13 goals with the club's reserves side in the VFL.

=== 2019 season ===
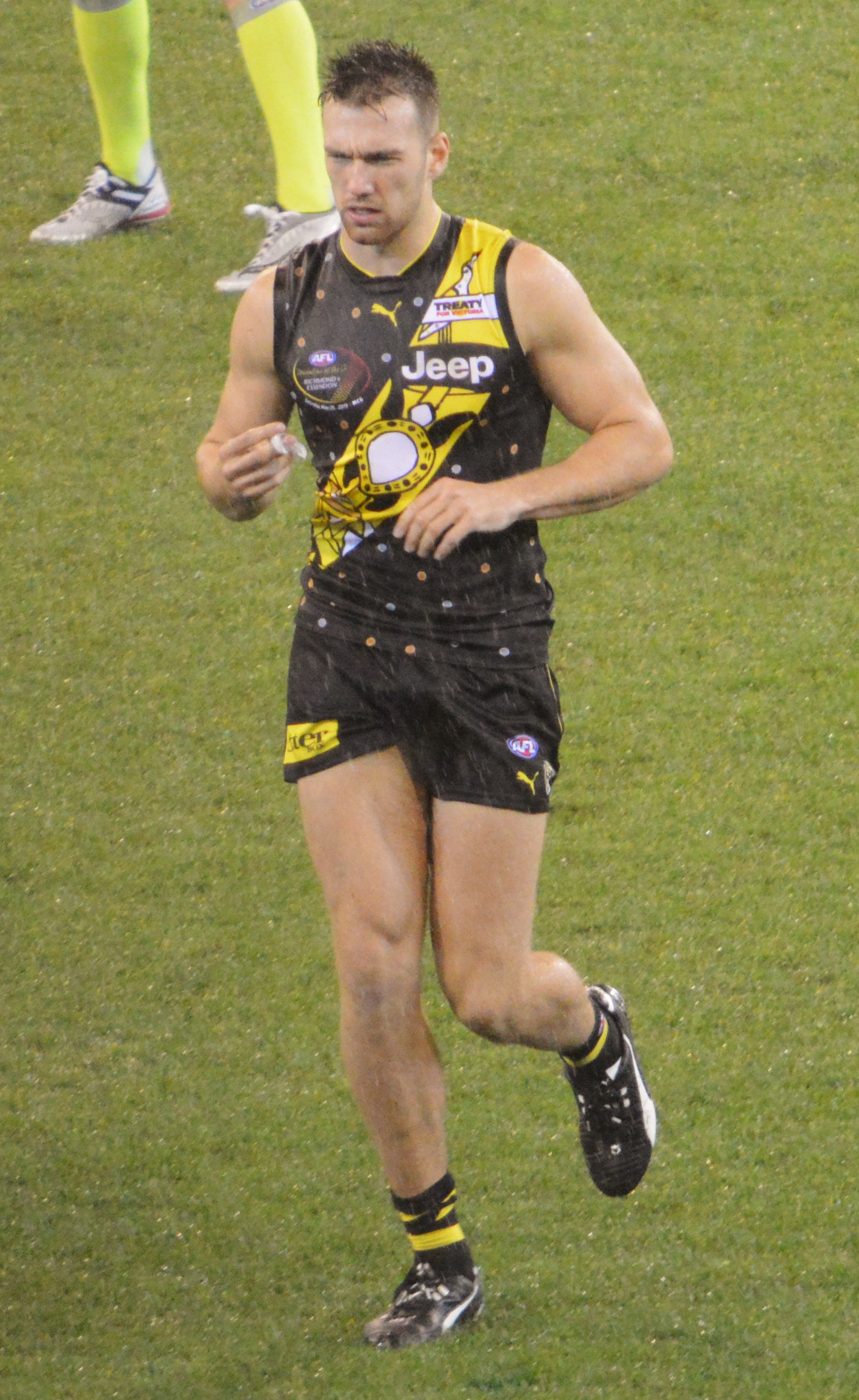
Balta during the Dreamtime at the 'G match in May 2019

Balta spent his second pre-season training as a forward and ruck and showed progress by kicking two goals in an intra-club practice in late February 2019. It was enough to earn him a berth in the club's first official pre-season match, where he contributed a "massive" second quarter performance in which he kicked two goals, took five intercept marks and recorded seven disposals on his way to a total of 18 disposals, nine inside 50s, six marks and two goals for the day. He followed that up with one more goal in the club's final pre-season match before earning a senior AFL debut in the season-opening match against Carlton at the Melbourne Cricket Ground. Playing as a forward and a relief ruckman, Balta managed one goal in the match, doing so with his first kick in league football. In that same match, All-Australian defender Alex Rance suffered a season-ending knee injury, leaving Balta considered as an option to replace him in the Richmond backline despite debuting as a forward. Balta was passed over for the role in round 2, but was selected to play in it in round 3 after playing as a defender in the VFL the previous week. The positional switch was not to become permanent however, with Balta regularly moved between forward, defence and the ruck across the early months of the season. Balta had a then-career best 13 disposals in round 8, forced into the role of lead ruck when Toby Nankervis went down injured midway through that win over Fremantle. He bested that mark with 14 disposals against Hawthorn in round 9 in which he was named among Richmond's best players by The Age. For the third consecutive week, he set a new personal disposals record with 18 in round 10's Dreamtime at the 'G win over Essendon in which he also set new highs for clearances (seven) and contested possessions (16). Balta remained in the senior side through the mid-season bye including in round 13, when he shared lead ruck duties with Mabior Chol in his side's loss to Adelaide. To that point he led all Rising Star eligible players for total hit outs that season despite limited game time as a ruck, while also placing fourth for inside-50s, contested possessions and contested marks among the same cohort. Following the injury return of many of the club's senior leaders post-bye, Balta was dropped back to VFL level where he played the fullback role as the team's deepest defender. He suffered a minor quad injury early in his second match back, missing most of that game as well as one further match before returning to VFL football in mid-July. Balta improved his defensive form in the weeks that followed, before being best afield in the VFL in mid-August while playing a ruck and forward role that included 18 disposals, 21 hit outs and two goals. That earned him a recall to AFL level for the final match of the home and away season, but it would prove just a one-week stint after he managed only five disposals and 10 hit outs. Balta suffered another corked thigh during that match, seeing him miss the club's first VFL final, before returning with 12 disposals in a VFL preliminary final win over Port Melbourne. Playing as a defender the following week with 11 disposals and seven marks, Balta was named by AFL Media among Richmond's best players in the VFL side that defeated Williamstown to win the club's first reserves grade premiership since 1997. He also took part in AFL grand final festivities the following week, participating in and making the final of the league's Grand Final sprint. Balta finished 2019 having debuted and played 13 matches at AFL level, while also winning a VFL premiership after nine matches with the club's reserves side.

=== 2020 season ===
In the 2019/20 off-season, Balta switched guernsey numbers, adopting the number 21 previously worn departing forward Jacob Townsend. He assumed the role left by the off-season retirement of fellow key-defender Alex Rance in the first match of the pre-season series, but was relegated to reserves level in favour of a small backline for the remainder of the series. Balta played just one VFL practice match however, after the balance of the pre-season was cancelled due to safety concerns as a result of the rapid progression of the coronavirus pandemic into Australia. Though the AFL season would start on schedule later that month, just one round of matches was played of the reduced 17-round season before the imposition of state border restrictions saw the season suspended for an indefinite hiatus. Balta took part in unofficial scratch matches against opposition reserves players when the season resumed 11 weeks later, owing to the cancellation of the VFL competition. After three such matches and following a knee injury to AFL-level key defender David Astbury, Balta was called up to senior level for round 5's match against Melbourne. As with all matches that year, it was held with playing time reduced by one fifth, owing to the need to play multiple games on short breaks under a revised fixture later in the year. Despite the shortened game, Balta produced a performance that included 20 disposals, a game-high 10 intercepts and team-high 409 metres-gained and earned himself six Coaches Association award votes as the equal second best player of the match. He kept North Melbourne and Greater Western Sydney forwards Ben Brown and Jeremy Cameron goalless during matchups over the month that followed, including after a virus outbreak in Melbourne forced the club to relocate to the Gold Coast. In late-July, coach Damien Hardwick publicly assured Balta his position, saying the club would look to play Balta and Astbury side-by-side when the latter were to make his return. Balta was equal-second-best on ground in round 9, earning four coaches votes for equal-game-high tallies in rebound-50s (five) and intercepts (nine) in a performance that had Hardwick publicly comparing him to former teammate and multi-time All-Australian Alex Rance. His next starring performance came in round 14, where he earned an equal-best on ground nine-coaches votes for a performance including 11 marks, nine intercepts and a match-sealing goal from outside 50. Following another three coaches votes against Fremantle in round 15, Balta held eventual Coleman medalist Tom Hawkins to just one goal in a round 17 win over Geelong, after which he was named by AFL Media as one of the competition's most improved players in 2020. He held his spot when Astbury finally returned from injury in the season-closing round 18 win over Adelaide and was rewarded for his breakout season with selection the AFL Players Association's 22Under22 team which recognises the best young players in the league. Balta contributed three marks in a qualifying final loss to the Brisbane Lions when the club's finals series campaign began in October. He was equally quiet in a semi-final win over St Kilda, but was among his side's best in the preliminary final win over Port Adelaide, where according to AFL Media he "completely dominated" opposition forward Charlie Dixon while keeping him to just one goal. He became a premiership player one week later, helping his side to a 31-point grand final victory over Geelong. After starting in defence, he was shifted into the relief ruck role for much of the second half, finishing with 12 disposals in the year-ending win. After a season in which he played 17 of a possible 21 matches, Balta placed eighth in the club's best and fairest count.

=== 2023 season ===
At the conclusion of the 2023 home-and-away season, Balta led all players in the league for total intercept marks that season.

== Playing style ==
Balta plays as a tall defender. He is notable for his physical attributes, possessing great athletic abilities, including running power and a high leap. He played his junior years and early AFL matches as a swingman, rotating between roles as a key defender, key forward and ruck. During his breakout 2020 season, Balta drew persistent comparisons to former teammate and multiple All-Australian full-back Alex Rance, including when All-Australian selector Glen Jakovich called Balta better than Rance at the same age.

== Statistics ==
Updated to the end of round 22, 2026.

Legend
G	Goals	K	Kicks	D	Disposals	T	Tackles
B	Behinds	H	Handballs	M	Marks	H/O	Hit-outs

Season	Team	No.	Games	Totals								Averages (per game)								Votes
Season	Team	No.	Games	G	B	K	H	D	M	T	H/O	G	B	K	H	D	M	T	H/O	Votes
2018		38	0	—	—	—	—	—	—	—	—	—	—	—	—	—	—	—	—	0
2019	Richmond	38	13	6	4	87	34	121	30	29	91	0.5	0.3	6.7	2.6	9.3	2.3	2.2	7.0	0
2020^{#}	Richmond	21	17	1	1	132	52	184	65	16	3	0.1	0.1	7.8	3.1	10.8	3.8	0.9	0.2	1
2021	Richmond	21	14	2	1	129	54	183	65	18	14	0.1	0.1	9.2	3.9	13.1	4.6	1.3	1.0	0
2022	Richmond	21	18	13	7	148	57	205	76	20	27	0.7	0.4	8.2	3.2	11.4	4.2	1.1	1.5	2
2023	Richmond	21	23	3	3	271	68	339	147	28	8	0.1	0.1	11.8	3.0	14.7	6.4	1.2	0.3	6
2024	Richmond	21	19	12	3	183	51	234	113	21	28	0.6	0.2	9.6	2.7	12.3	5.9	1.1	1.5	1
2025	Richmond	21	13	4	4	114	40	154	60	20	20	0.3	0.3	8.8	3.1	11.8	4.6	1.5	1.5	0
2026	Richmond	21	17	11	8	145	69	214	83	17	121	0.6	0.5	8.5	4.1	12.6	4.9	1.0	7.1	0
Career			134	52	31	1209	425	1634	639	169	312	0.4	0.2	9.0	3.2	12.2	4.8	1.3	2.3	10

== Honours and achievements ==
AFL

- AFL premiership player: 2020
- 22 Under 22 team: 2020

VFL

- VFL premiership player: 2019

Junior

- Under 18 national champion: 2017

== Personal life ==
Balta's parents were both born in Australia but each is of Croatian heritage, with ties to the Split and Vukovar regions. His father Ivan is an electrician by trade and in 2019 served as the assistant secretary of the Electrical Trades Union of Australia. His cousin is Richmond teammate Mate Colina.

Outside of football, Balta studied for a certificate in carpentry.

Coward-Punch Controversy

In December 2024, Balta was charged with assault after attacking a man outside the Mulwala Water Ski Club in Mulwala, New South Wales, an incident captured on CCTV that showed him shoulder‑charging the victim from behind before repeatedly punching him while the man was on the ground.

Balta later pleaded guilty to assault occasioning actual bodily harm, with prosecutors arguing in court that the attack was serious enough to place the victim at risk of death and describing the conduct as meeting the threshold of a high‑level offence.

Anti‑violence advocates characterised the incident as a “coward‑punch‑style” assault, noting that the victim was struck from behind and rendered airborne before hitting the ground. The victim's father stated "[Balta] should never be allowed to play football again", and "Hope [Balta] never comes back".

Balta was fined $3,000, placed under an 18‑month community corrections order, banned from alcohol, and given a night‑time curfew restricting his movements between 10 pm and 6 am.

Richmond had already stood Balta down for four matches following the initial charge, a sanction later criticised by prosecutors as insufficient given the serious coward punch nature of the assault. He also paid $45,000 in compensation to the victim as part of the sentencing outcome.

After serving his club imposed four game ban, he was selected to play for Richmond the weekend before his sentencing, drawing the ire of Victorian Premier Jacinta Allan and ex footballers, due to the coward punch nature of the assault. Although he received support from ex Richmond coach Damian Hardwick.
