= 2012 Richmond Football Club season =

Richmond Football Club
2012 season
- President: Gary March^{(7th season)}
- Coach: Damien Hardwick^{(3rd season)}
- Captains: Chris Newman^{(4th season)}
- Home ground: MCG
- Pre-season: 7th^{(2-2)}
- AFL season: 12th^{(10-1-11)}
- Finals series: DNQ
- Jack Dyer Medal: Trent Cotchin
- Leading goalkicker: Jack Riewoldt^{(65)}
- Highest home attendance: 78,285^{(round 1. vs Carlton)}
- Lowest home attendance: 10,961^{(round 16. vs Gold Coast}
- Average home attendance: 41,319^{(▼1,465 / ▼3.42%)}
- Club membership: 53,027^{(▲12,843 / ▲32.0%)}

The 2012 season marked the 105th season in which the Richmond Football Club participated in the AFL/VFL.

== 2011 off-season list changes ==
=== Retirements and delistings ===
Player	Reason	Club games	Career games	Ref
Will Thursfield	Retired	77	77	
Mitch Farmer	Delisted	28	31	
Ben Nason	Delisted	23	23	
Tom Hislop	Delisted	20	27	
Troy Taylor	Delisted	4	4	
Jamie O'Reilly	Delisted	4	4	
Robbie Hicks	Delisted	3	3	
Nick Westoff	Delisted	0	0	
Pat Contin	Delisted	0	0	
Ben Jakobi	Delisted	0	0	

=== Trades ===
Date	Gained	Lost	Trade partner	Ref
10 October	Steve Morris, Pick 15	Pick 14	Greater Western Sydney	
14 October	Ivan Maric	Pick 37	Adelaide	
17 October	Pick 79	Mitch Morton	Sydney	

Note: All traded picks are indicative and do not reflect final selection position

=== National draft ===
Round	Overall pick	Player	State	Position	Team from	League from	Ref
1	15	Brandon Ellis	VIC	Midfielder	Calder Cannons	TAC Cup	
2	26	Todd Elton	VIC	Tall Forward	Dandenong Stingrays	TAC Cup	
3	55	Matthew Arnot	VIC	Midfielder	Oakleigh Chargers	TAC Cup	

=== Preseason draft ===
Round	Overall pick	Player	Position	Team from	League from	Ref
1	9	Brett O'Hanlon	Midfielder	Dandenong Stingrays	TAC Cup	

=== Rookie draft ===
Round	Overall pick	Player	State	Position	Team from	League from	Ref
1	7	Addam Maric	VIC	Midfielder	Melbourne	AFL	
2	25	Ben Darrou	VIC	-	Sandringham Dragons	TAC Cup	
3	43	Steven Verrier	WA	-	South Fremantle	WAFL	
4	60	Gibson Turner	WA	-	Glenelg	WAFL	
5	74	Piva Wright	VIC	-	Dandenong Stingrays	TAC Cup	
7	90	John Heslin	VIC	-	Westmeath	GAA	

== 2012 squad ==
Richmond Football Club
Senior list		Rookie list	Coaching staff
2 Dylan Grimes; 3 Brett Deledio; 4 Dustin Martin; 6 Shaun Grigg; 7 Matt Dea; 8 Jack Riewoldt; 9 Trent Cotchin(vc); 10 Shane Edwards; 11 Jake Batchelor; 12 David Astbury; 14 Bachar Houli; 16 Luke McGuane; 17 Chris Newman(c); 18 Alex Rance; 19 Daniel Connors; 20 Ivan Maric; 21 Shane Tuck; 24 Ben Griffiths	25 Angus Graham; 26 Robin Nahas; 28 Jake King; 29 Ty Vickery; 30 Reece Conca; 32 Brad Helbig; 34 Andrew Browne; 35 Matthew White; 36 Dean MacDonald; 37 Jayden Post; 38 Steve Morris; 39 Tom Derickx; 40 Kelvin Moore; 41 Nathan Foley; 43 Brandon Ellis; 43 Todd Elton; 44 Matthew Arnot; 46 Jeromey Webberley	13 Brad Miller; 31 John Heslin; 47 Addam Maric; 48 Ben Darrou; 49 Steven Verrier; 50 Gibson Turner; 51 Piva Wright	Head coach: Damien Hardwick; Assistant coaches: Justin Leppitsch (defence); Adam Potter; Legend: (c) Captain(s); (vc) Vice-captain(s); Long-term injury list; Upgraded rookie; (B) Category B rookie; (vet) Veterans list; (ret) Retired; Updated: 18 August 2016; Source(s): Playing list, Coaching staff

== 2012 season ==
=== Pre-season ===
Round	Date	Score	Opponent	Opponent's score	Result	Home/away	Venue	Attendance
1	Friday, 17 February 6:45 pm	0.6.5 (30)	North Melbourne	0.7.2 (44)	Lost by 3 points	Home	Etihad Stadium	28,228
1	Friday, 17 February 8:55 pm	0.6.4 (40)	Hawthorn	0.5.7 (37)	Won by 3 points	Away	Etihad Stadium	28,228
2	Sunday, 4 March 5:10 pm	1.4.12 (105)	Fremantle	0.10.7 (67)	Lost by 38 points	Away	Subiaco Oval	7,294
3	Saturday, 10 March 3:10 pm	1.14.15 (108)	Geelong	0.6.13 (49)	Won by 59 points	Away	Kardinia Park	9,393
4	Saturday, 17 March 12:30 pm	20.20 (140)	Greater Western Sydney	10.6 (66)	Won by 74 points	Away	Manuka Oval	4,222

Note: Round 4 matches were conducted under normal AFL Premiership season rules and did not count towards the NAB Cup Ladder.

=== Home and away season ===
Round	Date	Score	Opponent	Opponent's score	Result	Home/away	Venue	Attendance	Ladder
1	Thursday, 29 March 7:45 pm	12.9 (81)	Carlton	18.17 (125)	Lost by 44 points	Home	MCG	78,285	15th
2	Saturday, 7 April 7:40 pm	8.16 (64)	Collingwood	12.13 (85)	Lost by 21 points	Away	MCG	57,268	15th
3	Saturday, 14 April 1:45 pm	20.13 (133)	Melbourne	11.8 (74)	Won by 59 points	Home	MCG	49,826	10th
4	Sunday, 22 April 1:10 pm	9.11 (65)	Geelong	11.9 (75)	Lost by 10 points	Away	Kardinia Park	21,926	13th
5	Sunday, 29 April 3:15 pm	14.13 (97)	West Coast	16.11 (107)	Lost by 10 points	Home	Etihad Stadium	28,464	14th
6	Sunday, 6 May 2:45 pm	13.13 (91)	Port Adelaide	8.6 (54)	Won by 37 points	Away	Football Park	18,522	12th
7	Saturday, 12 May 4:40 pm	13.13 (91)	Sydney	8.14 (62)	Won by 29 points	Home	MCG	40,352	12th
8	Saturday, 19 May 7:50 pm	15.9 (109)	Essendon	19.14 (128)	Lost by 19 points	Away	MCG	80,900	13th
9	Saturday, 26 May 1:45 pm	21.11 (137)	Hawthorn	10.15 (75)	Won by 62 points	Home	MCG	51,617	12th
10	Friday, 1 June 7:50 pm	18.13 (121)	St Kilda	16.17 (113)	Won by 8 points	Away	Etihad Stadium	49,337	10th
11	Saturday, 9 June 1:40 pm	9.12 (66)	Fremantle	12.6 (78)	Lost by 12 points	Home	MCG	43,801	11th
12	Saturday, 16 June 2:10 pm	11.20 (86)	Greater Western Sydney	12.2 (74)	Won by 12 points	Away	Showground Stadium	7,538	10th
13	BYE								10th
14	Saturday, 30 June 1:40 pm	13.9 (87)	Adelaide	17.4 (106)	Lost by 19 points	Away	Football Park	33,780	11th
15	Saturday, 7 July 2:10 pm	13.23 (101)	Melbourne	11.12 (78)	Won by 23 points	Away	MCG	46,773	10th
16	Saturday, 14 July 4:40 pm	13.10 (88)	Gold Coast	13.12 (90)	Lost by 2 points	Home	Cazaly's Stadium	10,961	11th
17	Saturday, 22 July 3:15 pm	14.15 (99)	North Melbourne	15.13 (103)	Lost by 4 points	Home	MCG	47,432	12th
18	Saturday, 28 July 7:40 pm	13.13 (91)	Carlton	14.11 (95)	Lost by 4 points	Away	MCG	46,013	12th
19	Saturday, 4 August 7:40 pm	20.12 (132)	Brisbane Lions	12.12 (84)	Won by 48 points	Away	The Gabba	22,193	12th
20	Sunday, 12 August 3:15 pm	22.1 (150)	Western Bulldogs	12.8 (80)	Won by 70 points	Home	MCG	28,286	12th
21	Saturday, 18 August 2:40 pm	11.6 (72)	Fremantle	13.16 (94)	Lost by 22 points	Away	Subiaco Oval	37,721	12th
22	Friday, 24 August 7:50 pm	13.24 (102)	Essendon	8.9 (57)	Won by 45 points	Home	MCG	47,590	12th
23	Sunday, 2 September 3:15 pm	16.10 (106)	Port Adelaide	16.10 (106)	Draw	Home	MCG	27,893	12th

Source: AFL Tables

== Ladder ==
2012 AFL ladder
Pos	Team	Pld	W	L	D	PF	PA	PP	Pts	
1	Hawthorn	22	17	5	0	2679	1733	154.6	68	Finals series
2	Adelaide	22	17	5	0	2428	1833	132.5	68	Finals series
3	Sydney (P)	22	16	6	0	2290	1629	140.6	64	Finals series
4	Collingwood	22	16	6	0	2123	1823	116.5	64	Finals series
5	West Coast	22	15	7	0	2244	1807	124.2	60	Finals series
6	Geelong	22	15	7	0	2209	1886	117.1	60	Finals series
7	Fremantle	22	14	8	0	1956	1691	115.7	56	Finals series
8	North Melbourne	22	14	8	0	2359	2097	112.5	56	Finals series
9	St Kilda	22	12	10	0	2347	1903	123.3	48	
10	Carlton	22	11	11	0	2079	1925	108.0	44	
11	Essendon	22	11	11	0	2091	2090	100.0	44	
12	Richmond	22	10	11	1	2169	1943	111.6	42	
13	Brisbane Lions	22	10	12	0	1904	2092	91.0	40	
14	Port Adelaide	22	5	16	1	1691	2144	78.9	22	
15	Western Bulldogs	22	5	17	0	1542	2301	67.0	20	
16	Melbourne	22	4	18	0	1580	2341	67.5	16	
17	Gold Coast	22	3	19	0	1509	2481	60.8	12	
18	Greater Western Sydney	22	2	20	0	1270	2751	46.2	8	

Rules for classification: 1) points; 2) percentage; 3) number of points for.
(P) Premiers

== Awards ==
=== League awards ===
Brownlow Medal - Trent Cotchin

==== All-Australian team ====
	Player	Position	Appearance
Named	Trent Cotchin	Wing	1st
Named	Brett Deledio	Bench	1st
Nominated	Ivan Maric	-	-
Nominated	Jack Riewoldt	-	-

==== Rising Star ====
Nominations:

Round	Player	Ref
3	Dylan Grimes	
17	Brandon Ellis	

==== 22 Under 22 team ====
	Player	Position	Appearance
Named	Trent Cotchin	Rover	1st
Named	Dustin Martin	Half-forward	1st
Named	Alex Rance	Back pocket	1st

==== Brownlow Medal tally ====
Player	3 vote games	2 vote games	1 vote games	Total votes	Place
Trent Cotchin	6	3	2	26	1st*
Brett Deledio	2	1	5	13	19th
Shaun Grigg	2	2	1	11	26th
Shane Tuck	1	3	1	10	32nd
Jack Riewoldt	1	1	1	6	60th
Dustin Martin	1	0	2	5	79th
Nathan Foley	0	1	1	3	104th
Alex Rance	1	0	0	3	104th
Ivan Maric	0	0	2	2	137th
Shane Edwards	0	1	0	2	137th
Robin Nahas	0	0	1	1	177th
Reece Conca	0	0	1	1	177th
Total	14	12	17	83	-

*Note: Trent Cotchin initially finished second just was awarded the Medal in 2016 when Jobe Watson relinquished his claim

=== Club awards ===
==== Jack Dyer Medal ====
Position	Player	Votes	Medal
1st	Trent Cotchin	296	Jack Dyer Medal
2nd	Brett Deledio	263	Jack Titus Medal
3rd	Ivan Maric	248	Maurie Fleming Medal
4th	Shane Tuck	207	Fred Swift Medal
5th	Shaun Grigg	198	Kevin Bartlett Medal

==== Michael Roach Medal ====
Position	Player	Goals
1st	Jack Riewoldt	65
2nd	Robin Nahas	34
3rd	Shane Edwards	29
4th	Dustin Martin	23
5th	Trent Cotchin	21
