= Steven Morris (Australian footballer) =

Australian rules footballer

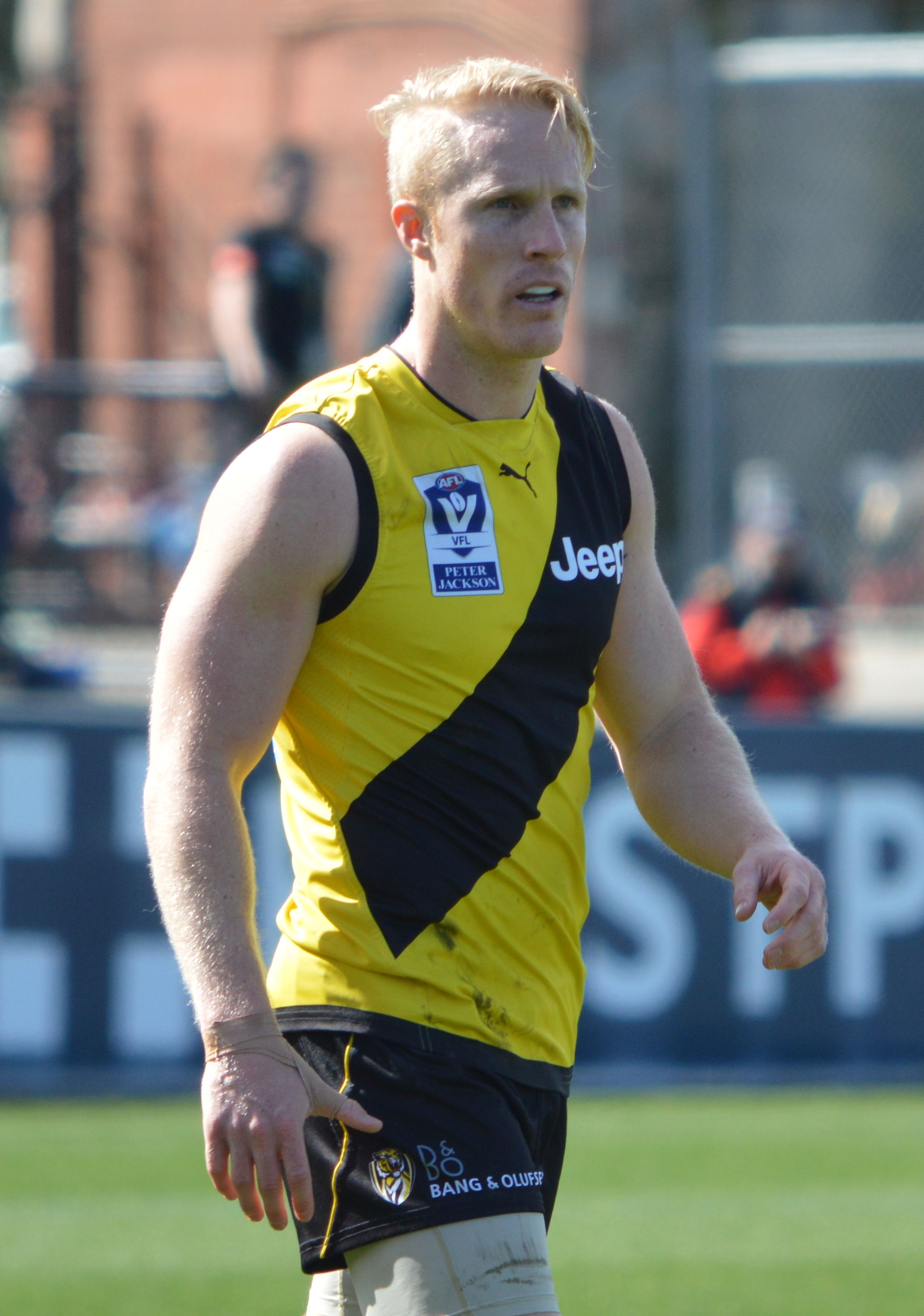
- Morris in August 2017

Personal information
- Nicknames: Morro, Stevey
- Born: 31 December 1988 (age 37)
- Original teams: Western Jets (TAC Cup); West Adelaide (SANFL)
- Draft: Pick 15 in the 2011 National Draft- traded player from GWS in exchange for pick 14.
- Debut: Round 1, 2012, Richmond vs. Carlton, at MCG
- Height: 185 cm (6 ft 1 in)
- Weight: 83 kg (183 lb)
- Position: Back pocket

Playing career^{1}
Years	Club	Games (Goals)
2012–2017	Richmond	87 (12)
- ^{1} Playing statistics correct to the end of 2019.

Career highlights
- SANFL: West Adelaide Best & Fairest: 2011; SANFL Team of the Year: 2011; VFL: VFL premiership captain: 2019; Richmond VFL captain: 2018- 2021

Steven Morris (born 31 December 1988) is a former professional Australian rules footballer who played for the Richmond Football Club in the Australian Football League (AFL).

== Junior and state league football ==
Morris grew up on his family's farm in the Victorian town of Toolern Vale, 39 kilometres north-west of Melbourne. He attended high school and played school football for St. Bernard's in Melbourne's north.

In 2007 Morris played for and captained the Western Jets in the TAC Cup. He was named in 2012 as a member of the Jets' all time best-22, celebrating the club's 21st anniversary.

Morris was passed over in successive drafts in 2006 and 2007 before making the decision to leave home and take a chance to play the SANFL. He moved in with family friends and began playing for West Adelaide in 2008. His father had previously coached the team to a Grand Final in 1991. At West Adelaide Morris endured numerous injuries that required season ending surgery including a shoulder reconstruction in 2008 and a knee reconstruction in 2009. He did not return to his best until 2011, when he won the club's Best & Fairest award. He was also named in the SANFL's team of the year in 2011.

== AFL career ==
Morris was signed to Richmond ahead of the 2011 draft period in a deal involving Greater Western Sydney. Due to draft concessions related to their coming introduction to the AFL, the Giants had priority access to all non-selected players from previous drafts. GWS agreed to swap picks with Richmond in exchange for claiming Morris and immediately on-trading him to the Tigers.

He made his AFL debut in Round 1 of the 2012 season in a match against Carlton. He recorded 9 disposals for the match. Morris played in his first win in Round 3 against Melbourne and kicked his first goal in a Round 9 victory against Hawthorn. Morris finished his debut season having played 21 matches and averaging 16 disposals as a small defender. He placed seventh in the club's best and fairest count.

He is completely fearless. He probably does a lot of things that don't show up on the stats sheet, but people at the club just love him and he makes his teammates come on stronger.

— Tom Hafey, Richmond coaching legend

In 2013 Morris ranked as one of the premier small defenders in the competition. Though his statistical output dropped, his ability to negate opposition forwards was praised by numerous footballing greats and media experts. At the time he was noted as Richmond legend Tom Hafey's favourite player in the current team. Through 21 rounds of the 2013 season, Morris ranked second on Champion Data's list of fewest goals conceded by a small or medium sized defender. He finished the season having played 22 matches including in Richmond's elimination final loss to Carlton. Morris placed seventh in the club's best and fairest count in 2013. He was also nominated for the AFL Player's Association Most Courageous Player award that year.

Morris' 2014 season was less spectacular, though he remained a mainstay in the Richmond best-22. He started the season strongly, posting averages of 13.7 disposals, 1.4 rebound-50s and 2.3 tackles per game across his first seven matches. He was suspended for one match following two separate rough-conduct offences in Round 15. Morris finished the season having played 21 matches, including in the team's second straight final series appearance. Morris required a shoulder reconstruction at the end of the 2014 season. Coach Damien Hardwick revealed that Morris had fought all season through the injury sustained in the last match of the year's pre-season competition. He finished tenth in the 2014 Jack Dyer Medal for Richmond's best and fairest player.

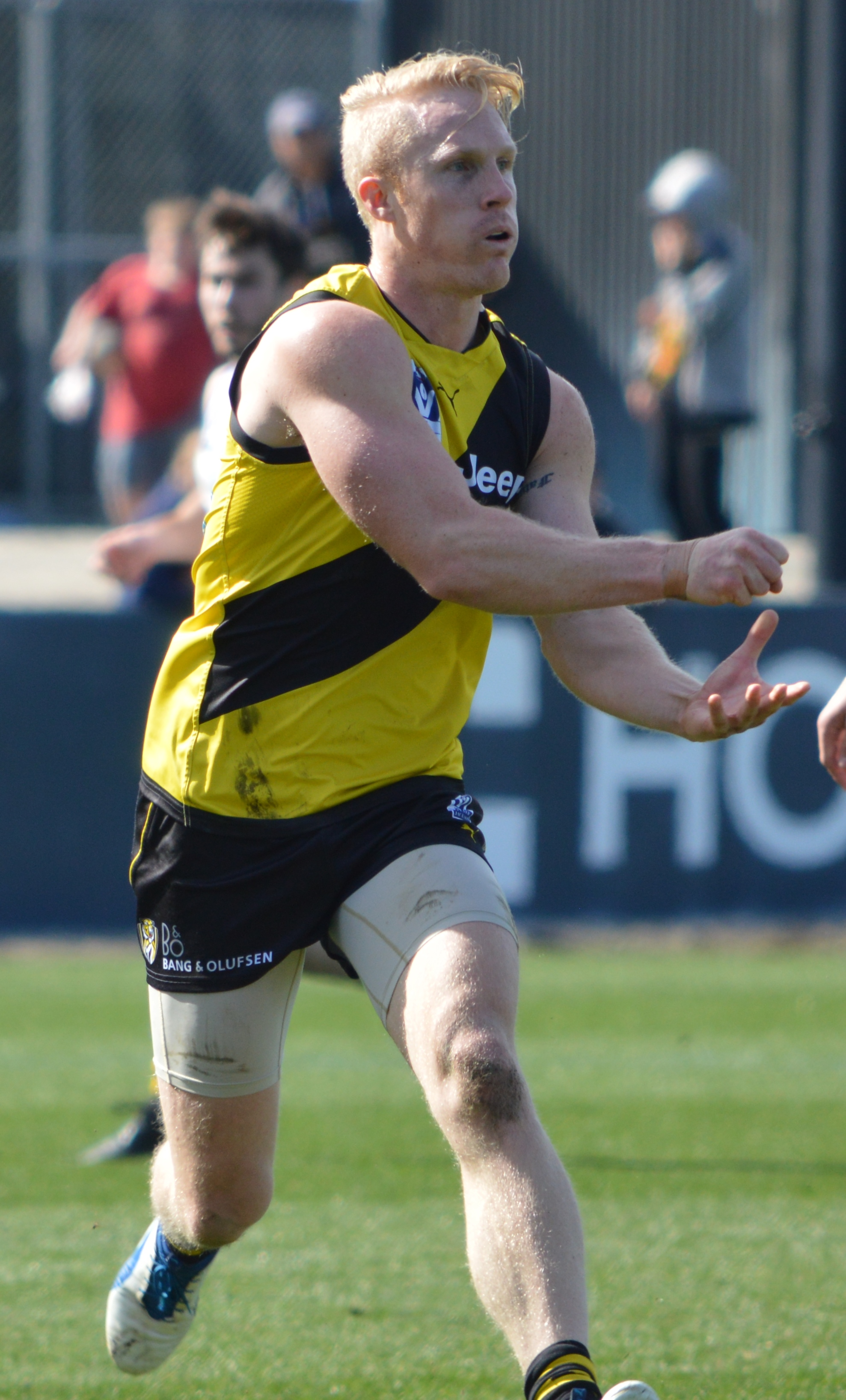
Morris handballs during play in the VFL in August 2017

In December 2014 it was announced that Morris had been voted into the club's five-man leadership group for the 2015 season. As part of this role, he was relied upon to captain the club in its first pre-season match of the year. But this wasn't the only change facing Morris in 2015, with coach Hardwick earmarking him for a role as a defensive small forward in the vein of the recently retired Jake King. Morris played the first 11 matches of the season, kicking four goals and averaging 3.5 tackles over the period. He was dropped ahead of Round 13 and did not return to the club's AFL side for two weeks. Morris was again dropped for the final two matches of the home and away season and completed the season with just 14 games played, his lowest career total to date. He posted career highs for tackles and goals per game but his lowest disposals per game average to date.

Morris was not returned to the leadership group in 2016 but was however returned to his role as a small defender. He would play in the first match of the season before being omitted from the side for four subsequent weeks. He returned to the senior side in Round 5, following a string of strong performances in the club's VFL team. Morris was lauded for his work ethic, with coach Hardwick labeling his string of form as good as any he had played at the club to date. He was amongst the Tigers' best in Round 9, kicking a goal and posting 19 disposals in a rebounding and defensive role. From his Round 5 return through the end of Round 10 he posted a disposals average of 12.7 per game as well as 3.7 tackles per game. In the first quarter of the club's Round 11 loss to North Melbourne, Morris would suffer a serious knee injury, later confirmed to be a rupture of his anterior cruciate ligament. It was to be a season-ending injury, with Morris finishing the year having played just eight matches.

Morris made his return to AFL football in round 6 of the 2017 season in a match against Adelaide at the Adelaide Oval. He recorded eight disposals and six tackles in the match and was subsequently omitted from the club's round 7 side. He did not return to senior football that year, instead playing out the year with the club's reserves side in the VFL. There he played in each of their three finals victories, and in the team's losing grand final against Port Melbourne.

Morris was delisted by Richmond at the conclusion of the 2017 season, having played 87 AFL matches over six seasons at the club.

== Coaching career ==
After being delisted by Richmond, Morris elected to sign with the club's VFL side for the 2018 season. There he took on the role of captain in addition to serving as a development assistant coach. In 2019 he captained the Richmond reserves side to a VFL premiership.

== AFL playing statistics ==
Legend
G	Goals	K	Kicks	D	Disposals	T	Tackles
B	Behinds	H	Handballs	M	Marks

Season	Team	No.	Games	Totals							Averages (per game)						
Season	Team	No.	Games	G	B	K	H	D	M	T	G	B	K	H	D	M	T
2012	Richmond	38	21	1	2	173	162	335	78	46	0.0	0.1	8.2	7.7	16.0	3.7	2.2
2013	Richmond	38	22	5	0	114	106	220	60	35	0.2	0.0	5.2	4.8	10.0	2.7	1.6
2014	Richmond	38	21	1	1	101	154	255	43	53	0.0	0.0	4.8	7.3	12.1	2.0	2.5
2015	Richmond	38	14	4	3	47	75	122	29	43	0.3	0.2	3.4	5.4	8.7	2.1	3.1
2016	Richmond	38	8	1	0	37	44	81	13	24	0.1	0.0	4.6	5.5	10.1	1.6	3.0
2017	Richmond	38	1	0	0	5	3	8	1	6	0.0	0.0	5.0	3.0	8.0	1.0	6.0
Career			87	12	6	477	544	1021	224	207	0.1	0.1	5.5	6.3	11.7	2.6	2.4

== Personal life ==
His father Kevin played 181 VFL games including in two premierships with Richmond and was a premiership coach at West Adelaide in 1991. His mother Jan previously represented Australia in basketball world championships and would have been an Olympian in 1980 if not for Australia's boycott of those games.
