= David Astbury =

Australian rules footballer

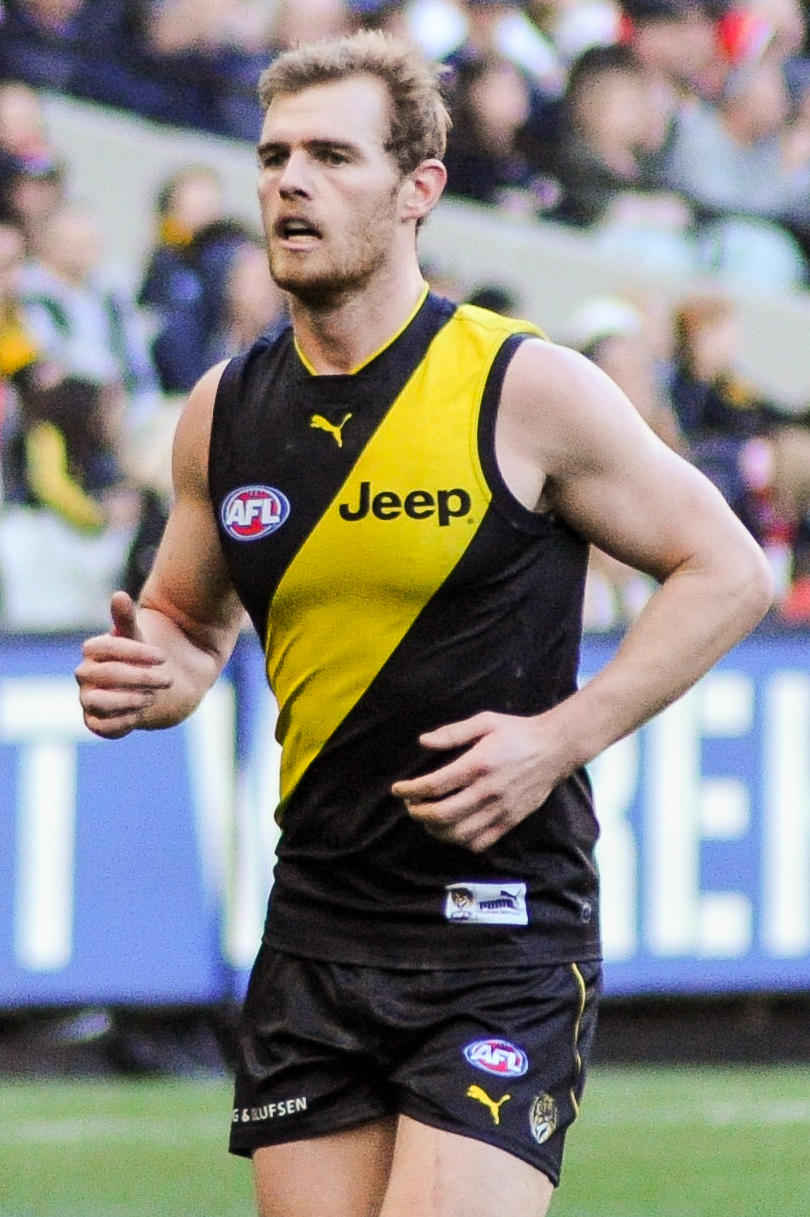
- Astbury playing for Richmond in June 2017

Personal information
- Full name: David Keith Astbury
- Nickname: Swoop
- Born: 26 February 1991 (age 35)
- Original teams: North Ballarat Rebels (TAC Cup); Tatyoon (MDFL)
- Draft: No. 35, 2009 AFL National Draft: Richmond
- Debut: Round 4, 2010, Richmond vs. Melbourne, at MCG
- Height: 195 cm (6 ft 5 in)
- Weight: 96 kg (212 lb)
- Position: Key defender

Playing career^{1}
Years	Club	Games (Goals)
2010–2021	Richmond	155 (9)
- ^{1} Playing statistics correct to the end of 2021.

Career highlights
- 3× AFL premiership player: 2017, 2019, 2020

David Keith Astbury (born 26 February 1991) is a former Australian rules footballer who played in three premierships over a 12-year career with the Richmond Football Club in the Australian Football League (AFL). Astbury was drafted by Richmond with the 35th pick overall in the 2009 national draft and made his debut in round 4 of the 2010 season. After an injury-affected start to his career that included just 24 AFL matches in his first five seasons, Astbury settled into a fullback and centre-half back role by 2016 and was a regular member of the club's senior side. He was a member of Richmond's three premiership sides in 2017, 2019 and 2020, and retired following the 2021 season having played 155 senior matches.

== Early life and junior football ==
Astbury was raised on a wheat and canola farm in the Western Victorian country town of Tatyoon. He played junior football with the Ararat Western Warriors in the Ararat & District Junior league and the Tatyoon Hawks in the Mininera and District Football League. Astbury played in two under-16s premierships during his time with Tatyoon.

In 2007 he moved to Melbourne on a boarding program with Caulfield Grammar School.

The following year he played four matches with the North Ballarat Rebels in the TAC Cup while still a boarder in Melbourne.

Astbury moved back home in 2009, taking the role of co-captain at the Rebels and playing a total of 10 games with the team. His best performance that year game in a match against the Western Jets where he recorded 18 disposals, 12 marks and three goals while playing in the forward line. That year he also represented the Victorian Country region at the 2009 AFL Under 18 Championships where he held averages of 14 disposals and four marks per game.

Astbury earned an invite to the national draft combine in Canberra that year, where he recorded a top-10 score in the kicking test. He was noted pre-draft for his work rate and endurance as well as his ability to play both as a key forward and key defender.

== AFL career ==
=== 2010 season ===
Astbury was drafted to with the club's third selection and the 35th pick overall in the 2009 AFL national draft.

Astbury played his first match against AFL opponents in a pre-season game against Hawthorn in Launceston in February 2010. He then spent the early part of the regular season playing at reserves level with Richmond's VFL affiliate Coburg. Astbury's AFL debut came in round 4, in a 55-point loss to Melbourne. In that match he played as a forward, recording seven disposals, three tackles and an equal-team-high three goals. Astbury played three more matches at senior level but failed to kick a goal in any. He was omitted from the club's round 8 side before making a return the following week and kicking a goal in that round 9 loss to Essendon. By the later part of the season Astbury was playing primarily as a defender, having kicked just one more goal that year. After playing 13 consecutive matches Astbury had his season ended early, sent for hip surgery following round 21's loss to St Kilda. He finished a promising first season with 17 matches played at AFL level.

=== 2011 season ===
Despite migrating fully to the role of key defender that off-season, Astbury was in November 2010 assigned the number 12 guernsey worn by club goal-kicking legend and recently retired forward Matthew Richardson. He first wore it in pre-season matches in February 2011 before being selected to play at senior level in round 1's season-opening match against Carlton. Astbury played a further three matches at senior level before being omitted from Richmond's round 5 side to take on North Melbourne. He returned to senior level in round 12, but was involved in a collision with Sydney midfielder Ben McGlynn early in the game. Astbury sustained a dislocated patella in the incident and did not return to the match, having failed to lodge an entry in any of the popularly recorded statistical categories. The resulting surgery revealed extensive damage to the medial collateral ligament too. Efforts to repair the knee would keep him sidelined and unable to play another AFL match that season, having only featured in five to that point.

=== 2012 season ===
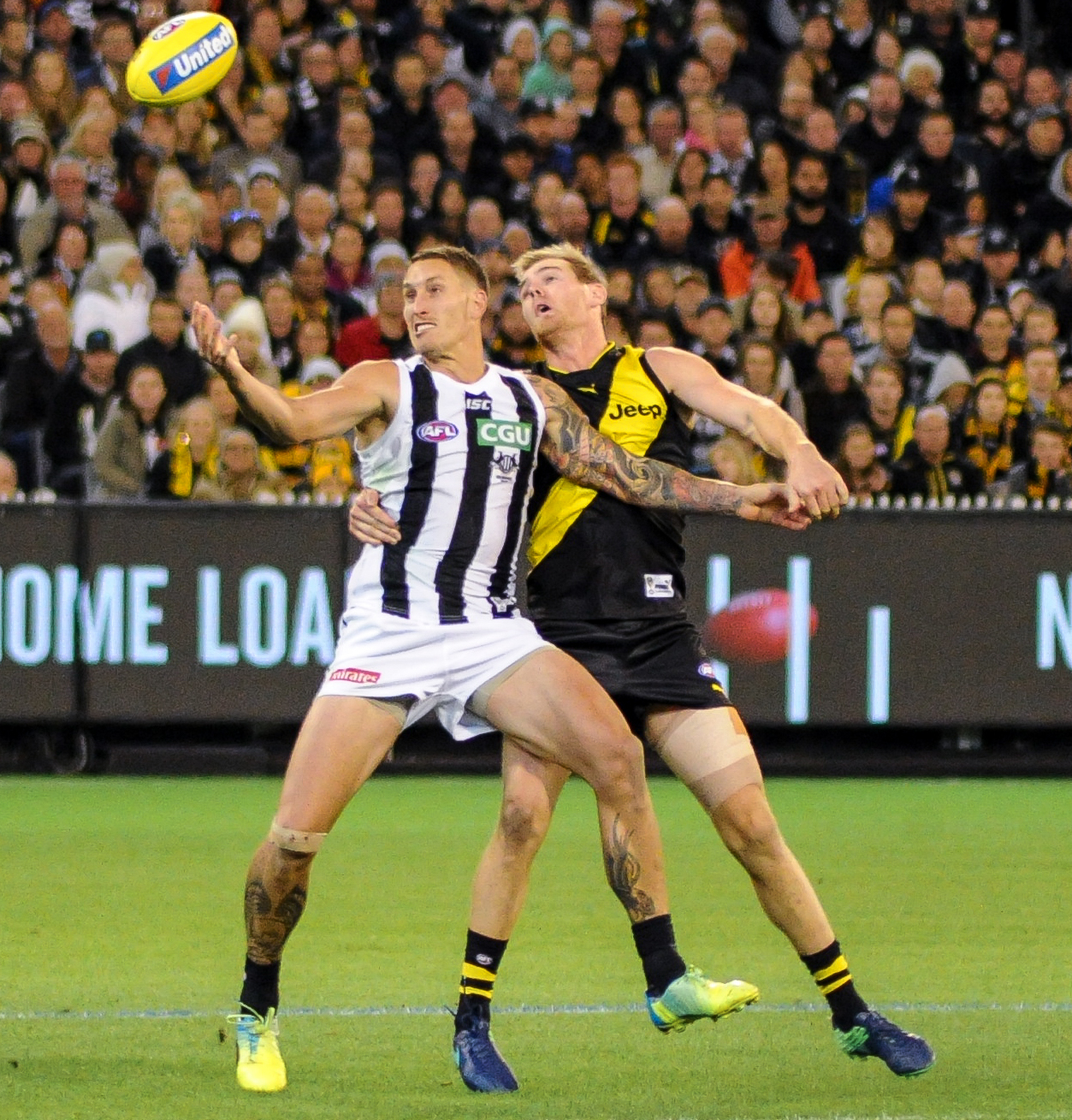
Astbury jostles with Collingwood's Jesse White in round 2 of the 2017 season

In the early parts of the 2012 season Astbury remained ruled out of action, with a second surgery forcing him to prolong rehabilitation on the knee injury sustained the year prior. After nearly a full year in recovery Astbury finally made his return to competitive football in mid-May. He did so with the development side of VFL team Coburg, a full two levels below the AFL. After further matches in the Coburg seniors, Astbury earned a re-call to AFL football as a key-position forward in a round 22 match against Essendon. He kicked a goal in that match and again the next week when he played in the club's final match of the season. Astbury finished the year at full health and having played two matches at AFL level that year.

=== 2013 season ===
Astbury begun the 2013 calendar in full-health and played in pre-season matches against the Indigenous All-Stars and Essendon in February and March respectively. Before the start of the season he sustained a foot injury however, and did not play in either of the first two weeks of the season. Astbury played limited minutes in the VFL the following week before missing another match with a knee complaint. As string of six straight matches at VFL level followed with Astbury impressing enough to be named as an AFL emergency in round 10. He earned his first match of the season at senior level a fortnight later, playing against Adelaide at the MCG. Another senior match followed in round 13 but Astbury found himself substituted out of the game with a minor ankle injury He rehabilitated the injury at VFL level before earning another AFL match in round 19. In that match Astbury played a key shut down role on Hawthorn forward Jack Gunston and earned himself a further two matches at senior level. More injury misfortune would befall him in the weeks that followed however, with further minor leg injuries keeping him from playing another match at either VFL or AFL level. Astbury finished the season having played five senior matches.

=== 2014 season ===
For the first time in three years Astbury begun the 2014 season in the club's best-22 and by round 2 had already turned in a "standout" performance, having kept Carlton's Jarrad Waite to just one goal while also recording 10 marks and five rebound-50s of his own. In round 4 he impressed again, this time keeping Collingwood forward Travis Cloke goalless. Yet another starring performance came in round 6 where he kept Hawthorn's Jarryd Roughead to one goal and was named by AFL Media as one of Richmond's best players that day. By the conclusion of round 8 it was clear Astbury was having the best season of his career to-date, a fact later confirmed when the club's best and fairest count revealed he was Richmond's second highest vote polling player to that point of the year. More injury troubles would await him however when in round 9 Astbury suffered another patella dislocation (this time in his left knee) while attempting to tackle Melbourne midfielder Jack Viney in the third quarter of that match. Though he reset the dislocation himself while still on the field, he would again need surgery to fully repair the damage. He did not play another match at AFL level that season, finishing with nine total. Astbury did however return for a single game in the final match of the season with Richmond's stand-alone reserves side in the VFL.

=== 2015 season ===
A full pre-season training program awaited Astbury in the lead-up to the 2015 season. Despite this, and though initially selected to play, Astbury withdrew from a pre-season match in February with knee soreness. He missed again in the following match of the series in March. Just days before he was due to line up in his club's round 1 side, Astbury was stung by a stingray while wading at a Port Melbourne beach. Surgery was required to remove the barb that caused minor damage to his left foot and ankle. He missed the first two weeks of the season as a result of the injury, before making a return to AFL football in round 3. Astbury remained in the senior side for a further three matches including in round 5, where he was moved into the Richmond forward-line in the match's third quarter and kicked his first goal since 2012. He was relegated to VFL football after a poor performance in round 6 however and faced a hamstring strain in the following weeks that would restrict his ability to push for senior selection. Astbury played a dual role as defender and forward, doing so well as to come under consideration (though ultimately unsuccessful) for AFL selection as a forward in round 15. He was later named as an emergency in round 19 but could not earn final AFL selection again at any point that season. Astbury finished the year only having played four AFL matches, bringing his five-year total to just 24. At season's end Astbury became the subject of media speculation concerning a potential move to the Brisbane Lions. Media reports suggested he had been offered a four-year deal worth a reported $500,000 per season and the promise of greater playing time at AFL level. An initial offer that would have seen Richmond give up Astbury and their pick 31 in exchange for Brisbane's pick 17 was rejected by Brisbane according to a report by The Age. Talks progressed so far that Astbury was confirmed to have traveled to Brisbane to meet club officials and complete a medical exam. By the middle of October a deal was reported to be almost complete, but a late period decision by Astbury to remain at Richmond saw him still at the club by the close of the trade deadline.

=== 2016 season ===
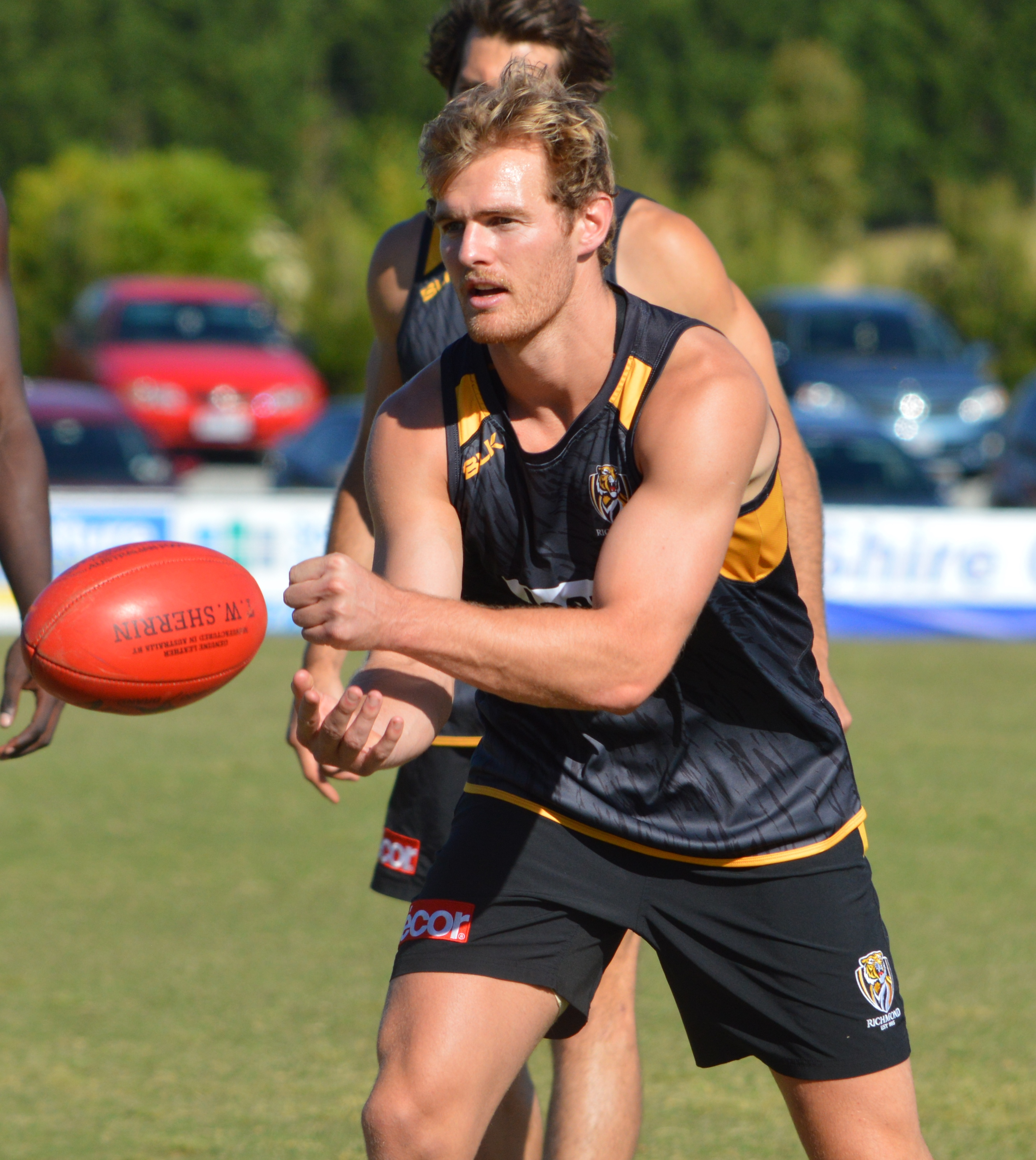
Astbury handballing during a training session in December 2016

Astbury underwent minor hip surgery in the lead-up to the 2016 season, but still managed what the Herald Sun labelled a "brilliant" pre-season training campaign. With the move of veteran defender Troy Chaplin to a new forward-line role, Astbury was the natural replacement as a key defender alongside All-Australian Alex Rance in the Richmond defence. He played that role in the club's first pre-season match in February but missed a large portion of the game after sustaining ligament damage to his thumb. The injury would require surgery and forced Astbury to sit out the remainder of the pre-season series. He was back to full health by late March however, and earned selection to the club's AFL side in round 1. In round 4 Astbury suffered another injury, this time in the form of a rolled ankle that ended his night in the fourth quarter of that match. He did not miss a game as a result of the injury however, instead playing a further two matches at AFL level before being omitted form the club's round 7 side due to poor form. Astbury returned to senior football after three weeks away, recording 11 marks in a win over Essendon in the marquee Dreamtime at the 'G match. He did not miss another match that year, playing in each of the final 13 matches of the season. After 14 rounds Astbury led all Richmond players for average intercept marks per game (2.3) while placing 16th in the league for that same statistic. In round 15, he recorded a career-best 23 disposals in a match against Port Adelaide. Five weeks later he set a new career-best for marks, taking 14 in his club's round 20 win over Collingwood. By season's end Astbury had played in a total 19 matches, the most of any year of his career to-date. He earned an 11th-placed finished in the club best and fairest count that year, with his 27 votes placing him just one vote behind tenth placed Brett Deledio. During the off-season Astbury avoid the contract drama of the year previous, having quietly signed a new three-year deal to keep him at Richmond until the end of the 2019 season.

=== 2017 season ===
Across the first two games of the 2017 season Astbury was a serviceable contributor to the Richmond defence. In round 3 though he was impressive in his own right, restricting reining Coleman Medalist Josh Kennedy For that performance he earned an honourable mention but ultimately went unselected in AFL Media's Team of the Week. Astbury led all Richmond players with 12 disposals to half time of round 4's match with Brisbane, finishing the game with 16 disposals and 11 marks. His form to that point was labelled by the Herald Sun as "career-best" while Richmond's back-line ranked number one in the league for fewest points conceded. The following week Astbury become a point of discussion concerning umpiring when he was adjudged to have illegally rushed a behind while fumbling the ball in round 5's win over Melbourne. His performance in round 9 was first-rate, recording an equal game-high four intercept marks as part of 10 total marks that saw him placed 20th in the league in that statistic so far that season. Another starring performance came in round 11 when Astbury restricted North Melbourne's Jarrad Waite to a single goal while recording 20 disposals and an equal team high eight intercepts of his own. He was one of six Richmond players recognised in the AFL Coaches Association award rankings for that match, recording 2 of a possible 10 votes. Astbury's assignment on Waite was part of a concerted effort by coach Damien Hardwick to have him defend other teams' best key-forwards and allow Alex Rance to play a more fluid offensive role. After 11 rounds of the season Astbury ranked sixth in the competition for intercept marks. Eight weeks later he had improved this position, now ranking fourth in the league for average marks, intercept marks and intercept possession while also ranking third for lowest defensive on-on-one loss percentage (20 per cent). Astbury passed his career-best games played mark in round 21, having not missed a game in 2017. In early August the Herald Sun labelled him as a "legitimate star" on the back of his development that season. At the end of the 2017 home and away season Astbury ranked eighth in the league for total marks recorded that season with 150 across his 22 matches. He also ranked equal 19th with his 106 one percenters. September saw Astbury play in the first final of his career, keeping Tom Hawkins to just one goal in a qualifying final victory over Geelong. In the preliminary final that followed, Astbury managed to keep Greater Western Sydney's Jonathon Patton to one goal, helping push Richmond to a 36-point victory and their first grand final in 35 years. In the 2017 AFL Grand Final Astbury was given the task of restricting Adelaide's Taylor Walker, which he did by keeping the Crows captain goalless until late in the match when the game was already out of reach. The Herald Sun ranked him the 11th best player of all 44 participants in the match that saw Astbury an AFL premiership player. Across the season and finals series Astbury ranked number eighth in the league for intercepts, ninth for marks and 20th for one-percenters in 2017. As part of his premiership success, Astbury was awarded life membership at Richmond.

=== 2018 season ===
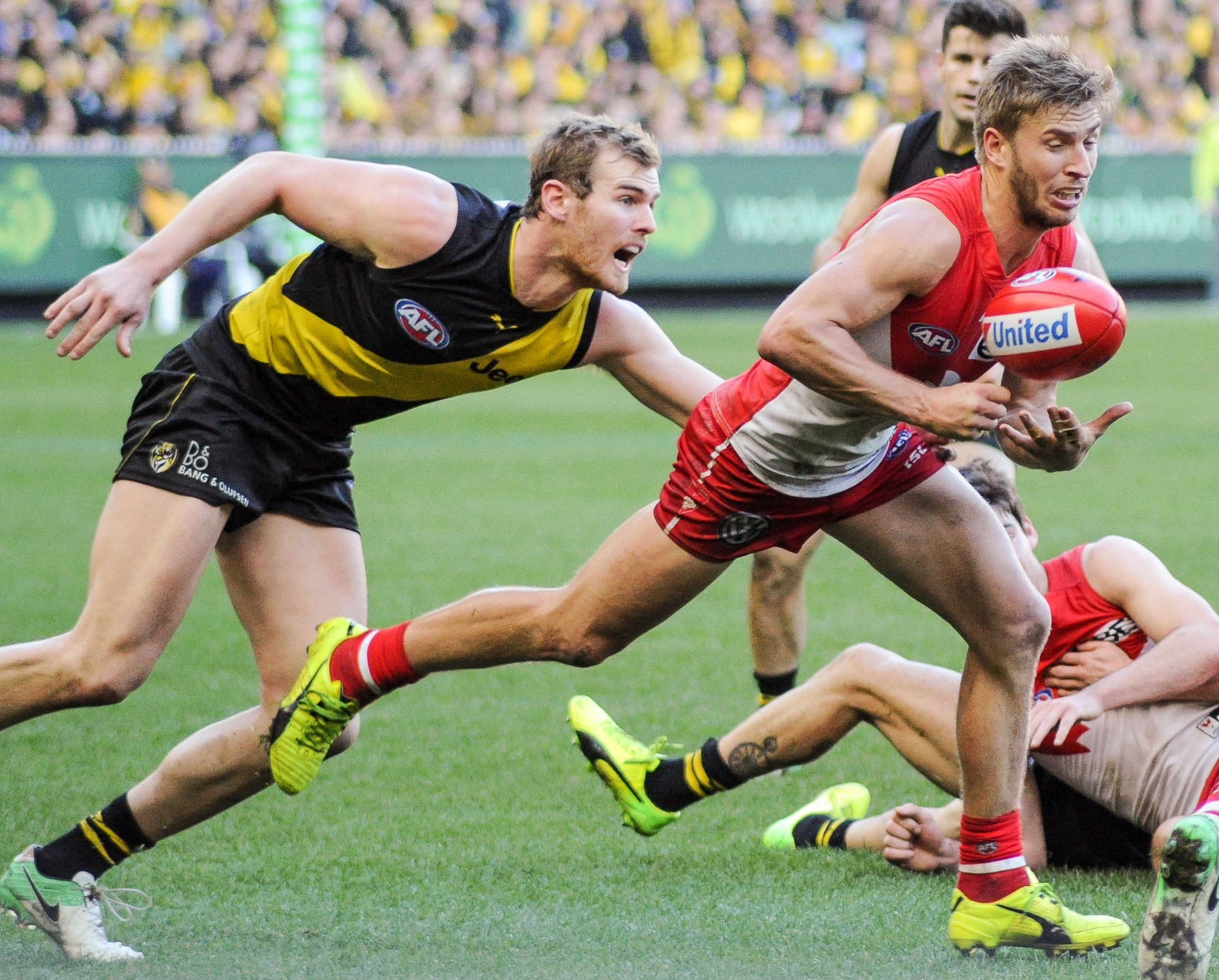
Astbury pursues Sydney's Kieren Jack in round 13, 2017

Astbury underwent minor shoulder surgery immediately following the end of the 2017 finals series, though still managed to complete a mostly-full training program in the lead-in to the 2018 season. He was back to full health in time for the club's first pre-season match of 2018, but suffered a head knock and a concussion during the match and played only limited game-time as a result. The effects of the concussion were minimal however as he managed to play in the team's second and final pre-season match in March as well as in the season opening match against Carlton later that month. In round 2 Astbury earned negative attention when he mis-kicked the ball in defence and allowed Adelaide a goal that would quash Richmond's fourth-quarter comeback. He made amends the following week, earning selection to AFL Media's Team of the Week for his efforts in Richmond's 13-point victory over Hawthorn. Astbury repeated the accolade in round 4, earning another Team of the Week selection as well as three votes in the AFL Coaches Association's award for his 20 disposal and six mark game against the Brisbane Lions. After four rounds Astbury ranked second in the league for most goals conceded to a direct-opponent with 13. In contrast he was placed highly in a number of positive statistics, ranking 12th for intercepts, 17th for marks and 20th for rebound 50s across all players in the league. In round 5 he set a new career-best with seven rebound-50s in a win over Melbourne. Two weeks later he equaled a previous career-best when he recorded 14 marks in the club's 77-point round 7 victory over Fremantle. For that performance he earned his third Team of the Week selection of the year. To the mid-point of the season Astbury ranked 13th in the league for intercepts and 17th for total marks. Astbury played his 50th consecutive match in round 12, but he also sustained a significant ankle injury in that loss to Port Adelaide. Though he played out the match on that injury, Astbury was forced to miss the following week's match with Geelong to rehabilitate the ankle before returning in round 15 against Sydney. During that match he was engaged in misconduct against opposition forward Tom McCartin that saw him attract a $1,500 fine from the AFL's Match Review Officer. Astbury played his 100th career match in round 17, a loss to the Greater Western Sydney at Spotless Stadium in Sydney. At that time he was labelled as "in the conversations" for All-Australian honours by one of the award's selectors, Seven Network commentator and former Richmond star Matthew Richardson. Two weeks later he was lauded by the ABC and received four Coaches Association Award votes after posting a season-best 21 disposals and a match-high 11 intercepts in Richmond's round 19 win over Collingwood. Astbury was rested for the round 22 match with Essendon due to Achilles soreness but returned to play in the club's final match of the home and away season the following week. In that match he received a fine for engaging in misconduct against Western Bulldogs player Fergus Greene. At the conclusion of the regular season Richmond had broken the league record for intercept marks in a season, with Astbury ranked third at Richmond in that statistic. In the club's qualifying final win over Hawthorn, Astbury recorded eight one percenters and was labelled "almost impassable" by AFL Media despite recording a season-low six disposals. He was the subject of significant media attention in the lead-up to the preliminary final two weeks later, after reports emerged that he contracted the common cold and was admitted to hospital for an intravenous drip just two days before that match. He was ultimately ruled fit to play in that match against Collingwood and did so primarily in defence with a later stint in the forward line when Richmond faced a significant half time scoring deficit. Astbury's performance in that shock knock-out loss was labelled by AFL Media as "lethargic and out of sorts". He finished the year having played in 22 matches and placed 12th in the club's best and fairest count.

=== 2019 season ===
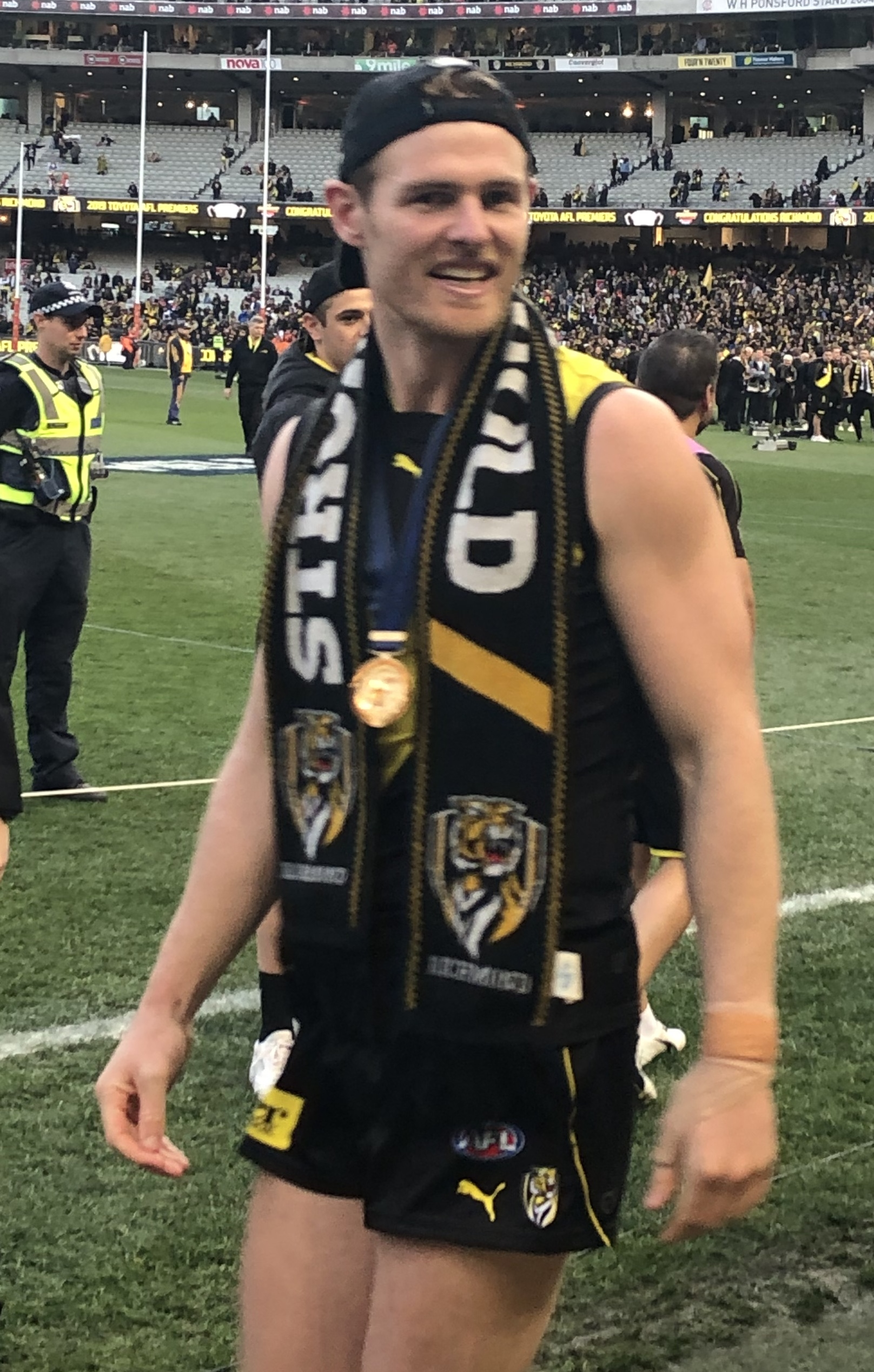
Astbury celebrates the 2019 premiership

In the 2019 pre-season Astbury was labelled by AFL Media as one of the league's two most underrated defenders along with teammate Dylan Grimes, with Astbury being noted for his ability to directly defend opposition key forwards and free his backline group to play a more attacking style. In February and March, Astbury made appearances in each of the club's two pre-season matches before recording nine disposals in round 1's season-opening match against Carlton. In that match, Astbury's backline teammate and five time All-Australian Alex Rance would suffer a season-ending torn ACL that left Astbury and the other members of the backline group to assume greater roles for the remainder of the year. The defence struggled under the task in early weeks, conceding 36 goals over a two-week stretch before stabilising with a win over Port Adelaide in round 4 in which Astbury contributed eight marks. Astbury suffered an ankle injury in the second quarter of round 6's win over Melbourne, playing out the match but ultimately being ruled out for the following week's match against the Western Bulldogs in which Richmond's defence conceded nine contested marks to Bulldogs forward Aaron Naughton. He returned after just one week out, averaging 16.3 disposals over the next four games to the end of round 11. In the final match of that run he managed his first goal since the 2015 season. A minor hamstring injury suffered while training would rule Astbury out for two matches from round 12 until the end of the club's bye, before making his return in round 15. Two weeks later, Astbury signed a new two-year contract extension that would see him tied to the club until the end of the 2021 season. In round 17, Astbury received one vote in the coaches association player of the year award as Richmond's equal fourth-best afield in a win over Greater Western Sydney. He bettered that the following week, earning four votes in a win over Port Adelaide at the MCG in which he recorded 16 disposals, four rebound-50s and an equal game-high nine intercept possessions. In round 20, Astbury attracted a $2000 fine from the AFL's match review officer for striking Melbourne's Harrison Petty in that win. After nine straight wins to finish the home and away season, Astbury contributed eight marks in a qualifying final victory over the Brisbane Lions at The Gabba. That earned the club a home preliminary final against Geelong, who in round 12 had beaten an Astbury-less Richmond side by 67 points. Astbury's addition, along with the suspension of Geelong forward Tom Hawkins provided a key difference, with Richmond winning through to a grand final match up against Greater Western Sydney. To that point, Astbury ranked eight in the league for defensive one-on-one wins, winning 40 per cent of his contests. In the grand final, Astbury led a Richmond defence that kept the Giants to 25 points, their lowest score in the club's eight-year history and the lowest score by any team in a VFL/AFL grand final since 1960. He kept his various direct opponents disposal-less over the length of the match, including his primary opponent Jeremy Finlayson, who finished the match with a single disposal, gathered while being covered by one of Astbury's Richmond teammates. After a season that included 22 matches and a second AFL premiership in three seasons, Astbury earned ninth place in the club's best and fairest award.

=== 2020 season ===
Astbury's importance to the Richmond backline was confirmed with the shock off-season retirement of fellow defender Alex Rance in December 2019. He demonstrated this with strong showings in each of the club's two pre-season matches in March before contributing 14 disposals in round 1's win over Carlton. The match was played under extraordinary conditions, the first of what had been announced would be a shortened 17-round season imposed on the league as a result of the rapid progression of the coronavirus pandemic into Australia. Due to public health prohibitions on large gatherings, matches that season were to be played without crowds in attendance and with quarter lengths reduced by one fifth in order to reduce the physical load on players who would be expected to play multiple matches with short breaks in the second half of the year owing to the likelihood of an extended break in play that season. Just three days later, the AFL Commission suspended the season after multiple states enforced quarantine conditions on their borders that effectively ruled out the possibility of continuing the season as planned. After an 11-week hiatus, Astbury contributed 14 disposals and six marks in a round 2 draw with Collingwood when the season resumed in early-June. In a loss to St Kilda two weeks later, Astbury suffered a partial dislocation of the patella bone in his knee. Though he was able to play out the match, scans later revealed damaged cartilage around the knee that would require surgery to correct and that would see him ruled out for an estimated four to five weeks. Astbury moved to the Gold Coast with the main playing group to rehabilitate the injury in early-July, relocating due to a virus outbreak in Melbourne. Astbury progressed ahead of schedule during July and was named by coach Damien Hardwick as likely to return for the club's round 8 match, before complications that week forced him into a slower recovery. He underwent a further arthroscopy in early August, revising out the timetable for his return to at least a further three weeks. He finally returned to match-play in a reserves-grade scrimmage match in mid-September, before earning a recall to AFL level one week later in the club's final match of the regular season. He recorded 14 disposals and a game-high nine intercepts in that round 18 win over Adelaide, and held his place into the club's finals series campaign. Astbury was similarly impressive in the opening week of the finals, taking seven marks in a qualifying loss to the Brisbane Lions. The loss would drive Richmond to structural change however, with Astbury assuming the role of relief ruck in the club's follow-up semi-final win over St Kilda. He fared ably in the match, and reprised the role in a preliminary final win over Port Adelaide the following week. Astbury became a three-time premiership player the following week, helping his side to a 31-point victory over Geelong in the grand final. Though he also began that match as a relief ruck, he was most impactful when structural changes mid-match forced him back into defence, where he kept Tom Hawkins to just one goal.

=== 2021 season ===
Astbury played his first football of 2021 in the club's unofficial pre-season match against Melbourne in February, before featuring in the club's sole official pre-season match against Collingwood in early March. He attracted a $2000 fine for an off-the-ball elbow to Carlton's Lachie Plowman in round 1, during a down performance that included just nine disposals. Astbury played as a defender and the team's second ruck in that match and across the first four rounds of the season, before settling into a much more heavily backline-focused role with only the occasional ruck contest as of round 5. He played an important role in negating Giants forward Jesse Hogan in the second half of round 9's win over Greater Western Sydney, but was soon after recognised by AFL statistical partner Campion Data as showing a 15% reduction in ranking points to the previous year, the second biggest drop of any Richmond player to that point of the season. Astbury was an injury omission from the club's round 11 match against Adelaide, with the club revealing he had been managing persistent Achilles soreness during the opening months of the season and was experiencing an acute flare up that would rule him out from selection. He made his return six weeks later in round 16's loss to the Gold Coast, before playing his 150th AFL match the following week against Collingwood. Astbury suffered an ankle injury in round 17's win over the Brisbane Lions which put him in some doubt for the following week, though he was ultimately able to play that match and each of the following four before missing round 22 as a late exclusion with a quad injury. In the days that followed, Astbury announced he would retire at season's end. He returned to fitness to feature in the club's year-ending round 23 draw with Hawthorn, labeled by The Age as one of his side's best players in the match after a 20-disposal and 13-mark performance in what was his final match. Astbury was later awarded the Francis Bourke Award at the club's best and fairest night, as the player that most embodies the club's key values.

In total, Astbury's career spanned 12 years and included 155 AFL games and three AFL premierships.

== Player profile ==
Astbury played as a key position defender, most often tasked with directly defending the opposition's tallest forward. His strengths were in defensive positioning and one-on-one marking. He played a dual role as key forward and defender in his junior years and in his first AFL season, and in 2020 he helped Richmond to a premiership win by playing as a relief ruck for most of the finals series.

Astbury was an important but under-recognised part of Richmond's defensive unit during its premiership run in the late 2010s, alongside All-Australians Alex Rance and Dylan Grimes. Astbury's ability to negate opposition tall-forwards was cited retrospectively as an important factor in allowing Rance and Grimes to play their lauded roles as interceptors.

== AFL playing statistics ==
Legend
G	Goals	K	Kicks	D	Disposals	T	Tackles
B	Behinds	H	Handballs	M	Marks

Season	Team	No.	Games	Totals							Averages (per game)						
Season	Team	No.	Games	G	B	K	H	D	M	T	G	B	K	H	D	M	T
2010	Richmond	39	17	5	5	110	83	193	57	29	0.3	0.3	6.5	4.9	11.4	3.4	1.7
2011	Richmond	12	5	0	1	12	14	26	3	6	0.0	0.0	2.4	2.8	5.2	0.6	1.2
2012	Richmond	12	2	2	0	6	6	12	5	4	1.0	0.0	3.0	3.0	6.0	2.5	2.0
2013	Richmond	12	5	0	0	30	22	52	18	2	0.0	0.0	6.0	4.4	10.4	3.6	0.4
2014	Richmond	12	8	0	0	71	37	108	42	15	0.0	0.0	8.9	4.6	13.5	5.3	1.9
2015	Richmond	12	4	1	0	20	22	42	14	8	0.3	0.0	5.0	5.5	10.5	3.5	2.0
2016	Richmond	12	19	0	1	156	101	257	127	25	0.0	0.1	8.2	5.3	13.5	6.7	1.3
2017^{#}	Richmond	12	25	0	0	221	154	375	159	36	0.0	0.0	8.8	6.2	15.0	6.4	1.4
2018	Richmond	12	22	0	0	184	138	322	125	23	0.0	0.0	8.4	6.3	14.6	5.7	1.0
2019^{#}	Richmond	12	22	1	0	209	90	299	132	12	0.0	0.0	9.5	4.1	13.6	6.0	0.5
2020^{#} (Note: The 2020 season was played with 17 home-and-away matches per team (down from 22) and 16-minute quarters with time on (down from 20-minute quarters with time on) due to the impact of the COVID-19 pandemic.)	Richmond	12	9	0	0	73	38	111	39	17	0.0	0.0	8.1	4.2	12.3	4.3	1.9
2021	Richmond	12	17	0	0	136	97	233	93	23	0.0	0.0	8.0	5.7	13.7	5.5	1.4
Career			155	9	6	1228	802	2030	814	200	0.1	0.0	7.9	5.2	13.1	5.3	1.3

== Honours and achievements ==
Team

- 3× AFL premiership player (Richmond): 2017, 2019, 2020
- McClelland Trophy (Richmond): 2018

Junior

- North Ballarat Rebels co-captain: 2009

== Personal life ==
Astbury's mother Kate was an unsuccessful candidate for Labor party pre-selection for the Victorian electoral seat of Ripon in 2017.

Astbury traveled to Rio de Janeiro in the summer before the 2014 season, one of nine Richmond players making a cultural-exchange trip as part of a project to work with disadvantaged kids that was developed by researchers at the Royal Melbourne Institute of Technology.

Outside of football he has studied an engineering degree at Swinburne University.

Astbury owns a property in his home town of Tatyoon.
