= Alex Rance =

Australian rules footballer (born 1989)

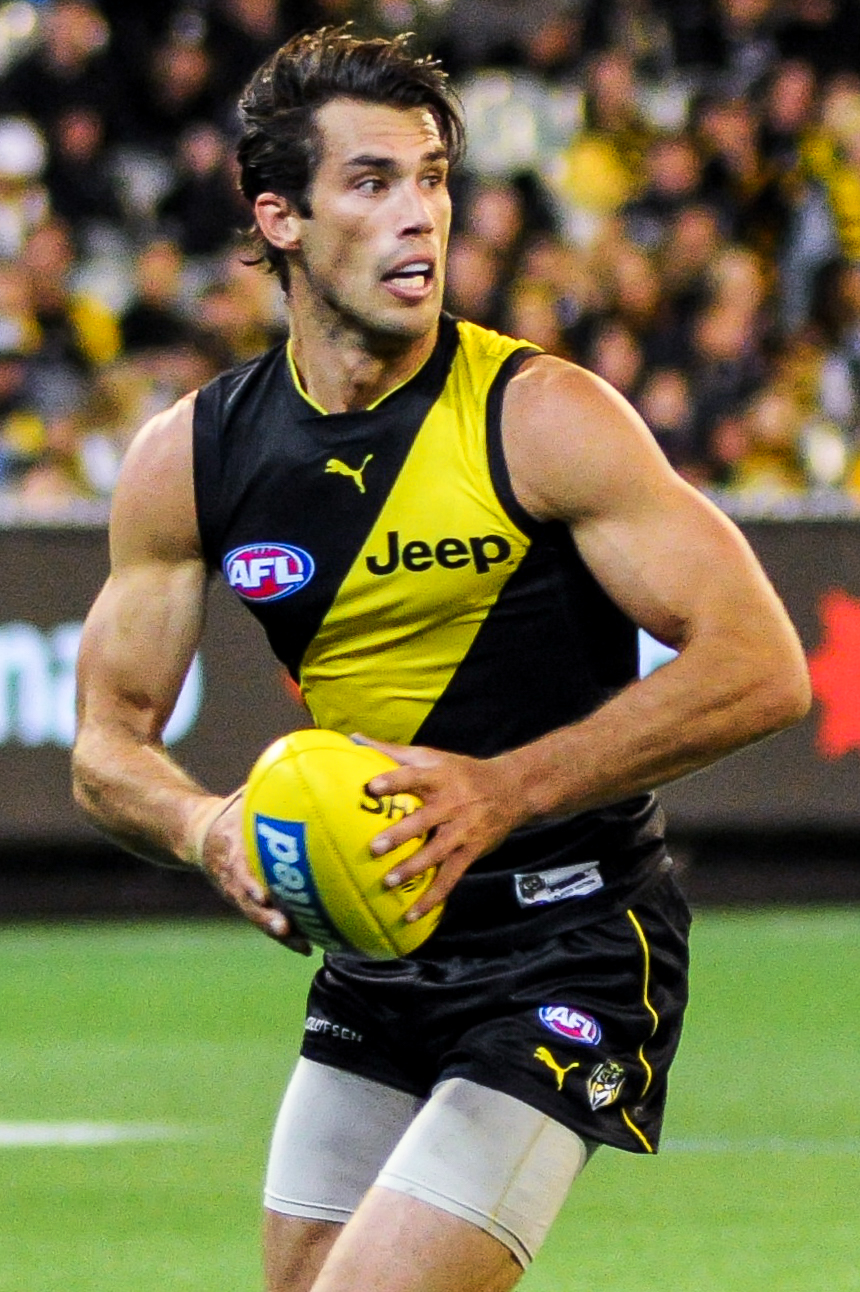
- Rance with Richmond in March 2017

Personal information
- Full name: Alex James Rance
- Nickname: Tross
- Born: 9 October 1989 (age 37); Perth, Western Australia
- Original team: Swan Districts (WAFL)
- Draft: No. 18, 2007 national draft
- Debut: Round 2, 2009, Richmond vs. Geelong, at Kardinia Park
- Height: 194 cm (6 ft 4 in)
- Weight: 96 kg (212 lb)
- Position: Fullback

Playing career^{1}
Years	Club	Games (Goals)
2008–2019	Richmond	200 (9)
- ^{1} Playing statistics correct to the end of 2019.

Career highlights
- AFL: AFL premiership player: 2017; 5× All-Australian team: 2014, 2015, 2016, 2017 (c), 2018; 22under22 team: 2012; Richmond: Jack Dyer Medal (RFC B&F): 2015; 2× Jack Titus Medal (2nd RFC B&F): 2016, 2017; Richmond vice-captain: 2017–2019; Richmond Life Member

Alex James Rance (born 9 October 1989) is a former professional Australian rules footballer who played for the Richmond Football Club in the Australian Football League (AFL). Rance was a premiership player, five time All-Australian, a one time All-Australian captain, a one-time winner of Richmond's best-and-fairest award and is widely regarded as one of the greatest defenders of his era. For three seasons between 2017 and 2019 he also served as Richmond's AFL co vice-captain.

== Early life and junior football ==
Rance is of strong footballing heritage, being the son of Murray Rance, a former Footscray and West Coast player and Swan Districts captain in the WAFL. Born in Perth in the latter years of his father's VFL career, Rance played junior football at the Noranda Junior Football Club in Perth's eastern suburbs. He later played for Noranda in the Western Australian Amateur Football League before again moving to the Swan Districts side in the WAFL. In 2007 Rance represented Western Australia at the Under 18 National Championships. There he won a premiership medal with the team as well as being selected as an All-Australian.

He completed high school studies at Guildford Grammar School in Perth, Western Australia.

== AFL career ==
=== 2008 season ===
Rance was drafted by Richmond with the club's second selection and the 18th overall in the 2007 AFL national draft.

He began his first season at the club by playing two levels below AFL, with the reserves side of Richmond's VFL affiliate, the Coburg Football Club. He played his first match at VFL level in mid April, before spending another month in development. When he returned in mid-May he became a regular selection, gathering 35 disposals and five tackles in a mid-June match. Though he spent some time in the lower level, he began to impress enough at VFL level that he was named an emergency for AFL games late in the season. He did not make his AFL debut that year, but did hold a spot in the VFL team through their finals series.

=== 2009 season ===
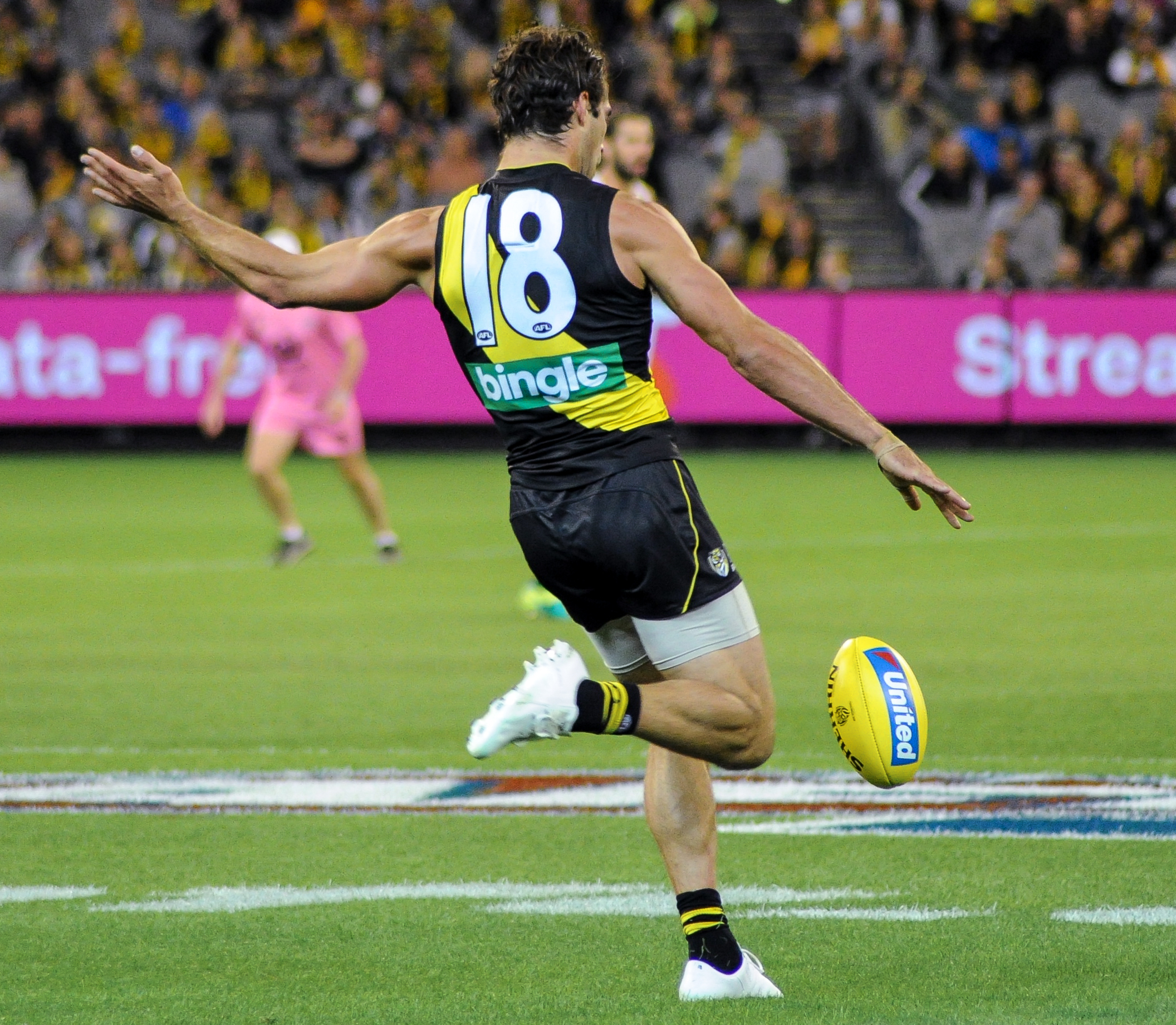
Rance kicks the football during play in 2017

Rance made his AFL debut in round 2 of the 2009 season in a loss to Geelong at Kardinia Park, recording 18 disposals and six marks in the match. Rance remained in the senior side until round 7, where he was involved in a head clash with Brisbane Lions player Troy Selwood. He suffered three small cheekbone fractures and missed three matches as a result of the incident. He returned to AFL level in round 11 and played three straight matches before missing his side's round 14 encounter with Adelaide. After one week out, Rance returned again to senior football in round 15, playing two more matches before another two week stint away from the level in rounds 17 and 18. But he would play out the last four rounds at AFL level, kicking his first career goal in round 19 and finishing the year having played 15 senior matches.

=== 2010 season ===
Rance played his first AFL match of 2010 in round 3 against Sydney at the SCG. That season he played in a number of different roles including as a key position player (in both forward and defence) a rebounding half-back, and was even named on-ball for Richmond's round 5 match against Fremantle. Rance drifted forward in that match however, kicking a career high three goals in an impressive display. After seven straight matches he would return to reserves football, before being recalled for one match in round 17. Despite notching a then career best 23 disposals and 11 marks, it was his only match in that spell, playing AFL matches on only two more occasions that season. He did not play in a victory that season, with the club losing all 10 matches he appeared in. Up to that point, Rance had shown plenty of athletic talent, but far more brain fades and failed plays. As a result of this form and an inability to gain regular selection at the highest level, Rance made contact with a number of clubs about a possible move, including North Melbourne, Fremantle, West Coast and Hawthorn. Despite some interest, he chose to remain at Richmond, later admitting he grew in confidence as a result of the desire competing clubs had to attain his services.

=== 2011 season ===
Rance's fourth year at Richmond would prove to be his breakout one. For the first time in his career he played round 1 in the club's senior side. He would be suspended in that match however, following a hit on Carlton's Jarrad Waite. Rance was suspended for three matches for the incident. He returned in round 4 and did not miss a match from that point forward. Rance earned the praises of former Richmond fullback Darren Gaspar for his work in round 13, consistently beating Brisbane Lions forward Jonathan Brown in one-on-one contests. The Herald Sun labelled Rance "a shining light in a shock loss" in round 17, after recording 25 disposals and nine one-percenters during a loss to the expansion side, Gold Coast. He was instrumental in restricting Sydney star Adam Goodes in round 21, holding him to just one goal while Rance collected 24 disposals and six marks in the Richmond win. At season's end he had lifted his disposals average from 12.5 the previous year to 19.1 per game in 2011. Rance finished second at the club for total marks that season (113) and equal second for rebound-50s (78). He also cited 2011 as key for his growth as a key position defender, praising the efforts of then Richmond-defensive coach Justin Leppitsch in teaching him the technical aspects of the role. He was duley rewarded with the club's Most Improved Player award that season.

=== 2012 season ===
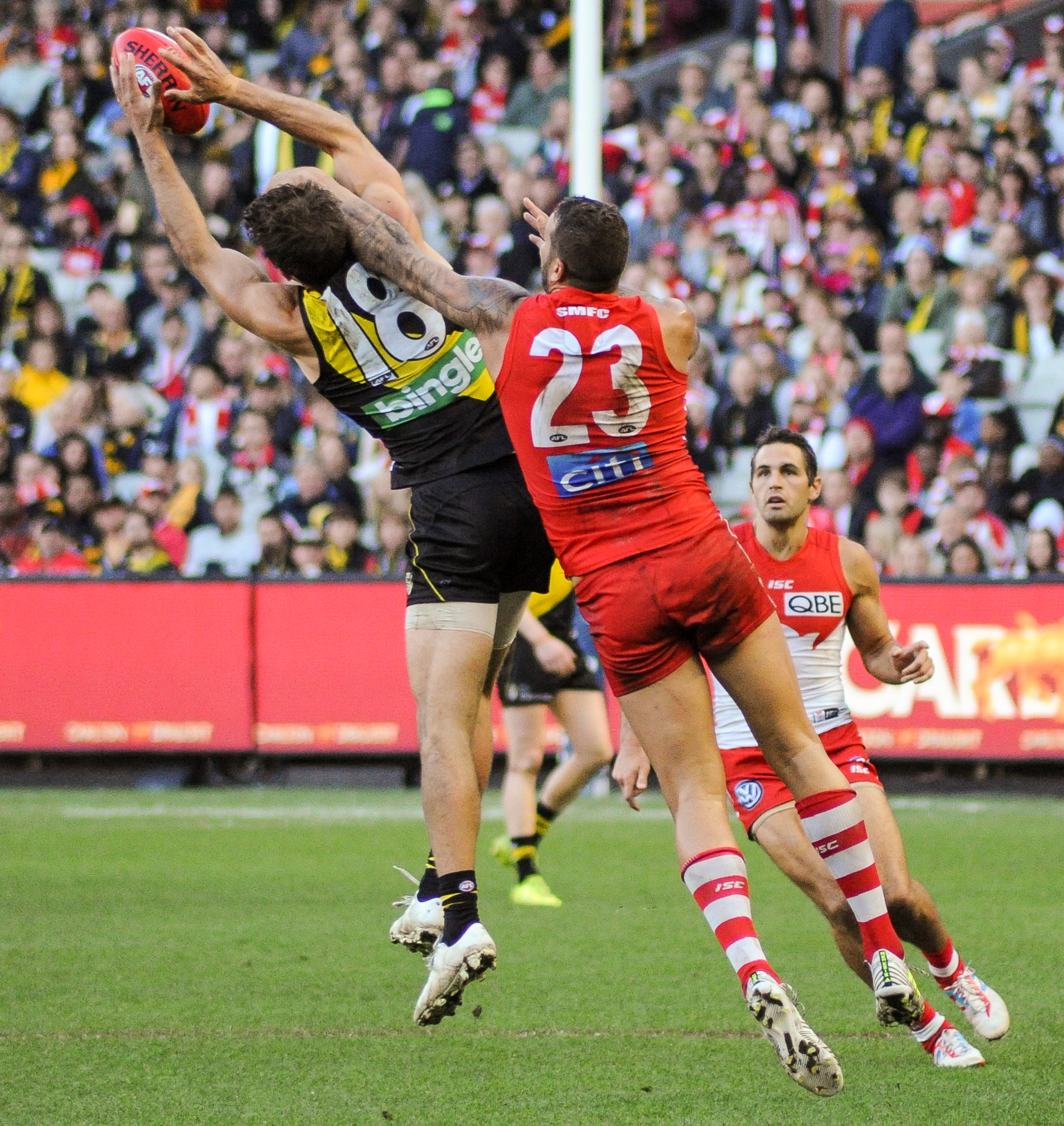
Rance takes a mark in front of Sydney forward Lance Franklin in round 13 match of the 2017 season

Rance approached the 2012 season with building expectations, citing a desire to play finals for the first time. Though the club did not reach the goal in 2012, Rance's output improved considerably. In addition to his growing acumen in the rigidly defence focused parts of his game, he began improving on his rebound from defensive 50. In round 2's win over Collingwood, he recorded a career-best 34 disposals as well as a career best 17 marks. In a round 6 win against Port Adelaide, Rance recorded his first career Brownlow Medal votes, scoring the maximum three votes for the match. He finished the season with then career-best totals in kicks, marks and handballs after playing all 22 possible matches for the first time in his career. Rance also placed sixth in the club's best and fairest award.

=== 2013 season ===
Rance started the 2013 season poorly, giving up a career-best four goals to Western Bulldogs forward Liam Jones in the clubs' round 3 match-up. Despite this, he remained the team's foremost defender even with the recent acquisition of former Port Adelaide tall defender Troy Chaplin, whom Rance praised heavily prior to and during the season. During the season Rance would be tasked with defensive roles on some of the league's best forwards including Travis Cloke, Josh Kennedy and Lance Franklin. In particular, his performance in negating Franklin in the club's round 19 match against Hawthorn was crucial to the team's victory. He held Franklin to only one goal in the match. In 2013 Rance played in the club's first final in 12 years, an elimination final loss to traditional rivals Carlton at the MCG. At the end of the season Rance was ranked ninth in the league for marks. He ranked first at the club for marks, rebound 50s and one-percenters as well as top ten in both kicks and handballs. Rance received the player-voted Francis Bourke award for the second time in three seasons for his embodiment of the club's principles of awareness, belief and discipline.

=== 2014 season ===
After playing in Richmond's round 1 match against Gold Coast, Rance would subsequently miss 5 matches due to a bizarre foot-fracture. He sustained the break while riding his bicycle prior to the club's round 2 match. At the mid-point of the season, Rance was labelled by his coach as the best "one-on-one player in the competition", before he recorded a season-high 29 disposals in the club's round 13 match with Fremantle. Through round 15 Rance was placed first in the league for win–loss differential in one-on-one contests. In Richmond's must-win round 23 clash with Sydney, Rance recorded 16 disposals with a spectacular 12 coming off intercept possessions. Teammate Jack Riewoldt said at the time it was "probably the best quarter of footy (he'd) ever seen someone play" while Richmond CEO later said that Rance "single-handedly won that game." Rance won his first All-Australian selection that year, named in the position of centre half back. He also won his third consecutive player-voted Francis Bourke award at Richmond's best and fairest night.

In later years, Rance would reveal he had privately decided to give up football after enduring a grueling 2014 season. He had intended at the time to complete the last year of his contract in 2015 before retiring from the game.

=== 2015 season ===
In the early parts of the 2015 season, Rance's unwillingness to sign a contract extension with Richmond led to media speculation concerning his future. It was reported at the time that he was considering significant contract offers from other AFL clubs, specifically Fremantle and the Brisbane Lions. Later reports emerged suggesting Rance was also considering retiring. On-field his game followed the trajectory established in previous years, with Rance maintaining his status as one of the competition's best defenders. In round 2, he "annihilated" young opposition forward Tom Boyd in his defensive matchup, also contributing 13 marks and 28 disposals in a loss to the Western Bulldogs that saw Rance post a career-best 156 Champion Data ranking points. In round 15 he was among the best players in a win over Carlton, notching 18 disposals in a first half in which the Herald Sun said he "looked unbeatable in one-on-on-one contests" and that also earned him the label as the "dominant figure on the ground". Through 17 matches Rance had conceded only 19 goals, and with a disposal average of 17 per game, was a solid rebounding presence as well. In June Rance ended contract speculation by signing a four-year contract extension at Richmond, keeping him tied to the club through the end of the 2019 season. Rance finished the season playing in all 23 of the club's matches including in an elimination final defeat at the hands of North Melbourne. His season was rewarded with the Jack Dyer Medal as the club's best and fairest player. He also won a second consecutive selection as an All-Australian, this time in the position of fullback.

=== 2016 season ===
Prior to the 2016 season, Rance was voted by his peers into Richmond's five man leadership group. As the only defender in the group, he replaced teammate Troy Chaplin as the official leadership voice of the club's backline. Rance was reported in April for striking Melbourne's Jack Watts in an incident in the clubs' ANZAC Day-eve clash. He subsequently accepted a two match ban for the incident and offered a public apology for his actions. Rance played all other matches that season and finished with a then career-best 155 marks for the season from his 20 matches. It was also a career best year for average disposals, as he continued to improve his rebounding from defensive 50. Having notched up his 150th game for the club, Rance was awarded life membership at Richmond. Rance was selected as an All-Australian for the third consecutive season, equaling a club record for most career selections. He narrowly missed out on his second straight best-and-fairest, pipped by teammate Dustin Martin 61 votes to 62.

=== 2017 season ===
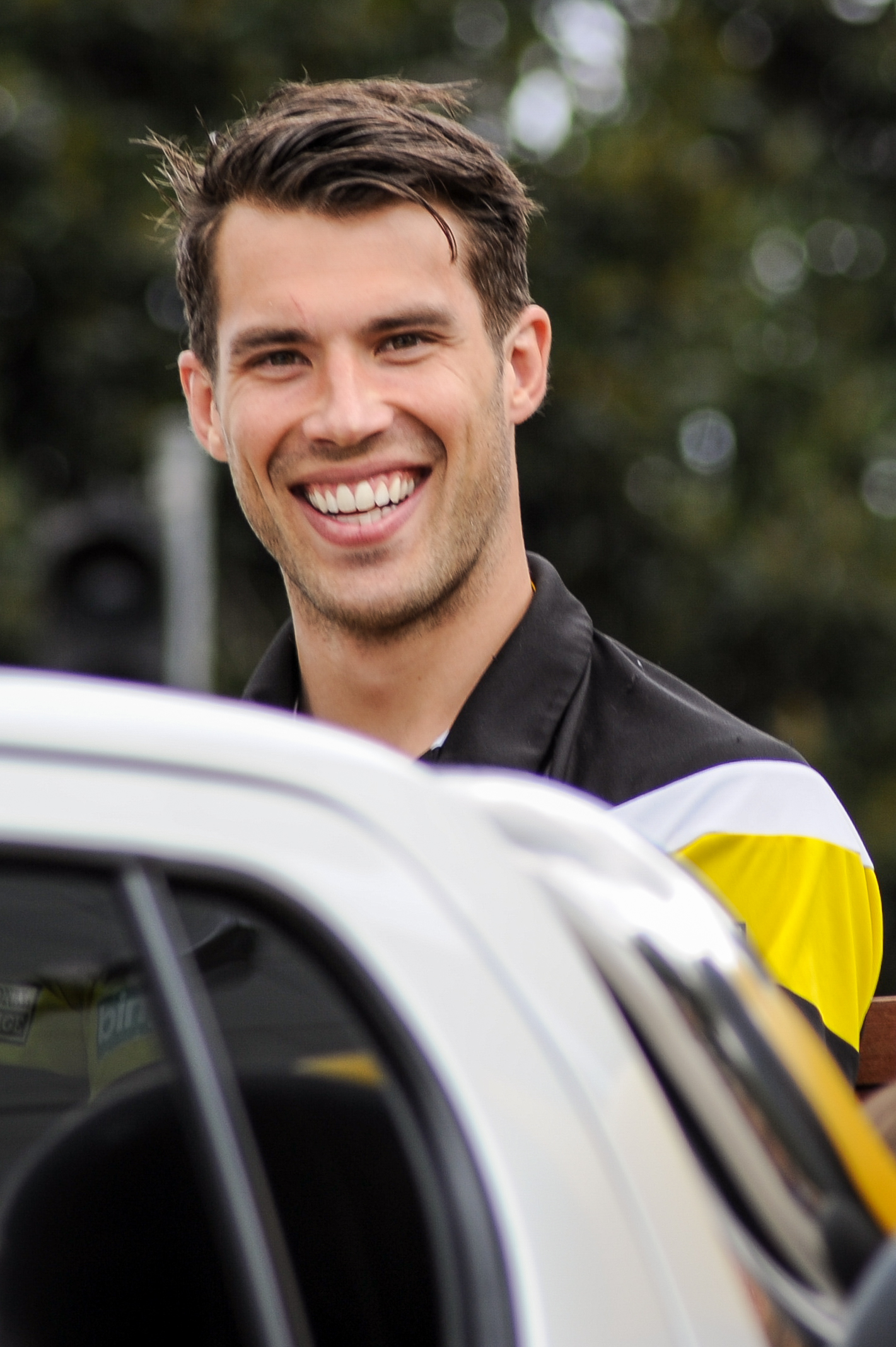
Rance pictured during the 2017 AFL Grand Final parade

Ahead of the 2017 season Rance was ranked the competition's best key position defender as part of the AFL statistics partner Champion Data's annual ranking. Though he went through a full pre-season program, a minor hamstring injury left Rance sidelined in Richmond's first match of the 2017 JLT Community Series. Back in full health, Rance was named as the club's co-vice captain prior to round 1. He led the Richmond backline in its contributions to a five win streak to open the season, seeing the Tigers ranked the best defence in the league. Personally he was averaging the most intercept possessions and any key defender in the league (8.4) as well as the third most intercept marks (2.8). At the midpoint of the season Rance led the competition in intercept possessions (9.0 per game) and improved his metres-gained from 213.2 per game in 2016, to 300.9 mid-way through 2017. At that same time he was named at fullback in AFL Media's mid-season All Australian team. Rance received media and public criticism for excessive exaggeration following an incident in round 13 we he received a free kick during a push and shove with Sydney forward Lance Franklin. The AFL's match review panel were later of the opinion that "any exaggeration of the contact that was made to Rance was not excessive" and decided not to penalise him for the fall. To that point Rance ranked third in the competition for intercept marks (38) and first for spoils (115). In round 21 Rance was comprehensively bested by Geelong defender-turned-forward Harry Taylor who kicked four goals in his side's defeat of Richmond at Kardinia Park. He kicked his first goal in four years the next week though, pushing forward for a brief spell during Richmond's 104 point domination of Fremantle. At the end of the home and away season he was named in the All-Australian team for the fourth consecutive time. He was also named the team's captain, the first non-club captain to receive the honour since Andrew McLeod in 2007. When he faced a rematch with Geelong and Taylor in a qualifying final, Rance had his revenge, restricting the Cat to eight disposals and a single goal in Richmond's win. He added 16 disposals and seven marks in a winning preliminary final too, before his side progressed to a grand final matchup against minor premiers Adelaide. There he became a premiership player, leading the Richmond defence during a first half onslaught in the 48 point victory. He received two votes in the Norm Smith Medal for the best player on the ground, placing third. In the days that followed he would receive the Jack Titus Medal as second place in the club's best and fairest count (behind Brownlow Medalist Martin) and be named at fullback in AFL Media's Team of the Finals. His 97 rebound-50s set the seventh best mark in club history, while his 242 one-percenters eclipsed his previous best to set a new club record.

=== 2018 season ===
Upon entering the 2018 season Rance was named by an AFL Players Association poll as the best defender in the game and the sixth best player in the league overall, up four places from the year before. He played his first matches of the year in Richmond's two pre-season wins over Essendon and North Melbourne. In round 1's win over Carlton he was described as "impassable" by the Herald Sun's Sam Edmund. The following week Rance was bested by Josh Jenkins, conceding four first half goals to the Adelaide forward. In round 3 he was named one of Richmond's best, earning four votes in the Coaches Association award. Rance also attracted the attention of the AFL's Match Review Officer that week, being fined $2,000 for an errant late spoil on Hawthorn's Luke Breust. After four matches Rance led the league in intercept possessions (10.5 per game) and ranked third for intercept marks (3.8). In round 7 Rance's Richmond defence held Fremantle to a club record equal second-lowest first-half score of nine points. In round 11 Rance attracted significant media and public criticism for a 'diving' incident during the Dreamtime at the 'G match in which he exaggerated contact in a marking contest with Essendon forward Shaun McKernan and drew a free kick as a result. He accepted a $1,000 fine after the incident was classified by the AFL's match review officer as staging. At the half-way point of the season Rance was named in Fox Footy's mid-year All Australian squad while also being named in the Herald Sun and AFL Media teams of 22 players. To the end of round 13 Rance was ranked number one in the league for intercepts as well as fourth for one percenters and ninth for total marks recorded that season. He continued to hold the league's number one rank for intercepts through round 16 and also improved to second for intercept marks and fifth for spoils. It was at this time he signed a new two-year contract extension that saw him tied to the club until the end of the 2021 season. Rance picked up two votes in the Coaches Association award in round 20, this time as Richmond's equal third best player in a win over Geelong. Two weeks later Rance served as Richmond captain for the first time. He led the side to a win over Essendon in the absence of Trent Cotchin due to hamstring soreness. At season's end he was named All-Australian for a fifth consecutive season. In doing so he became the third among then-active players to receive the honour in five consecutive seasons after Gary Ablett Jr. did it between 2007 and 2014 and Scott Pendlebury, who did it from 2010 to 2014. He was also named in the back pocket of the AFL's Player Ratings team of the year. Rance also led Richmond players with 72 intercept marks during the home and away season, leading the club to a league record-breaking total of 417. In the first week of the finals Rance recorded 13 disposals in Richmond's qualifying final victory over Hawthorn. Rance equaled a season-best with 20 disposals in the club's preliminary final match-up, a shock knock-out loss to Collingwood that brought his season to an end. Following the conclusion of the 2018 finals series, Rance was named by the Herald Sun's chief football writer Mark Robinson as the league's fourth best defender and 15th best player overall during the 2018 season. He also placed sixth in the club's best and fairest count, one vote shy of fellow defender Dylan Grimes.

=== 2019 season ===
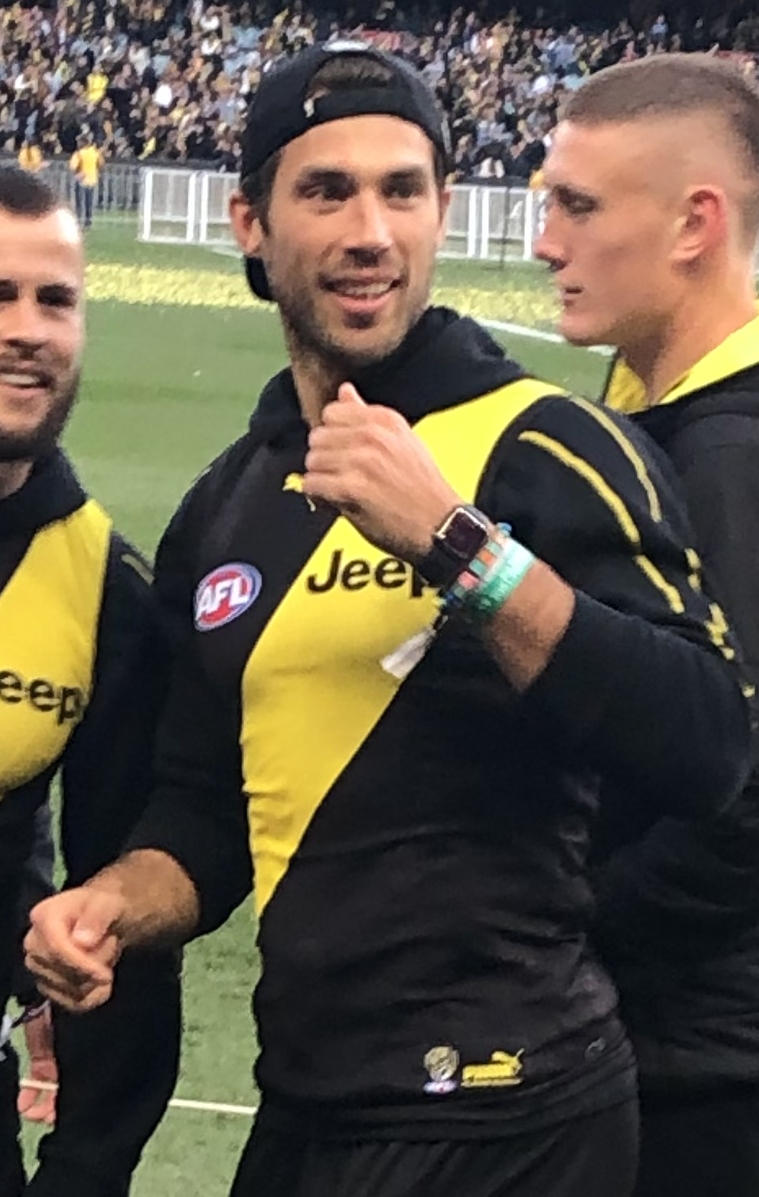
Rance celebrates with teammates following Richmond's 2019 Grand Final victory which he missed due to injury

Rance opened his 2019 season by participating in an AFLX exhibition tournament in February. He was drafted to play for the 'Flyers' team by captain Nat Fyfe with the seventh overall pick in a televised draft. Rance followed that with appearances in each of Richmond's two pre-season matches in late February and early March before playing his 200th AFL match in the season opening match against Carlton at the MCG in late March. Late in the third quarter of that match, Rance landed awkwardly during a marking contest and severely injured his right knee in what coach Damien Hardwick labelled a "suspected ACL (tear)". Scans completed the following day confirmed that Rance had ruptured his anterior cruciate ligament. He had surgery to reconstruct the knee in the week that followed and was expected to miss the remainder of the 2019 season. With a minute chance that he would recover in time to play again that season, Richmond refused to move Rance to the club's long-term injury list, effectively keeping open the option of a late-season return. By early May, teammate Dylan Grimes said Rance's recovery was progressing extraordinarily fast and that in three weeks of rehabilitation "he's shown more improvement than we've seen in some ACLs in three months." Rance resumed running of as mid-June, while speaking optimistically about an end-of season return. Within two weeks he was running straight lines at close to full speed, with coach Hardwick saying Rance was likely to press for a return to football that season and was "that far ahead of schedule, it's not funny." Rance told the media in late July that a decision on whether to step up his training into lateral movement and football exercises would come following a meeting with his surgeon the following week. In the first week of August, Rance announced publicly he was opting to suspend his attempt to return that season, citing the risk of re-injuring the knee and the impact such an injury could have on the team mid-match and potentially in a key final. He instead turned his attention to coaching, assisting the club's VFL side in an off-field role as they progressed through the finals and won the club's first reserves grade premiership since 1997. Despite his absence, the club also managed a second AFL premiership in three seasons, with teammates praising Rance's inspirational rehabilitation group leadership in a season where many of Richmond's best players spend long stints on the sidelines due to injury. At season's end he was co-winner of the club's Francis Bourke award for the sixth time, voted on by his teammates for the player who most represents the club's values of awareness, unitedness, relentlessness and discipline.

After a minor knee arthroscope in November, Rance returned to limited training when his Richmond teammates commenced full pre-season training in the first week of December 2019. Club officials said at the time that he would be in full training by January and fully fit to participate in the club's official pre-season matches.

=== Retirement ===
On the morning of 19 December 2019, Rance announced to his teammates his decision to retire effective immediately, announcing to the public through a club statement that he would "prioritise the more important things" in his life, listing spiritual growth and family and friends. Rance said the decision was a continuation of his contract uncertainty following the 2014 and 2015 seasons, but that his knee injury was fully repaired and did not play a part in the decision, only that his dedication to rehabilitating the injury had "left some other areas of my life wanting, and so I need to spend that bit of time on those areas now."

Media reports in the days that followed claimed that Rance had been considering the decision and consulting with club officials over it for at least three weeks prior to the announcement. The Herald Sun reported that list manager Blair Hartley advised Richmond CEO Brendon Gale in late November that Rance would imminently retire, saying "I think he's done."

In announcing Rance's retirement, Richmond CEO Brendon Gale labelled Rance "one of the finest players to play at (the) club" in its history.

== Playing style ==
Rance played as key-position defender and is considered one of the best defenders in the history of the sport. He has been regularly referred to by media and football experts as the best defender in the game since his first All-Australian season in 2014. By mid-2017 some media personalities began talking about Rance as one of the best defenders of all time, with Essendon great Dustin Fletcher saying "If he's not there yet he is heading in the right direction." In April 2018 Richmond coach Damien Hardwick inadvertently waded into the discussion, labeling Rance "the fullback of the century" in a post-game press-conference remark. Port Adelaide premiership coach Mark Williams praised in particular Rance's ability to zone off his direct opponent, saying: "Rance's ability to get up the ground and off his man, his drop-off marking is as good as I have ever seen."

Following his retirement in December 2019, Rance continued to earn plaudits including being named by Seven Network commentator and Hall of Fame Legend Leigh Matthews as the greatest defender of the modern era.

In his early seasons he played matches in various roles including as a wing, general defender and even as a forward.

== Other work ==
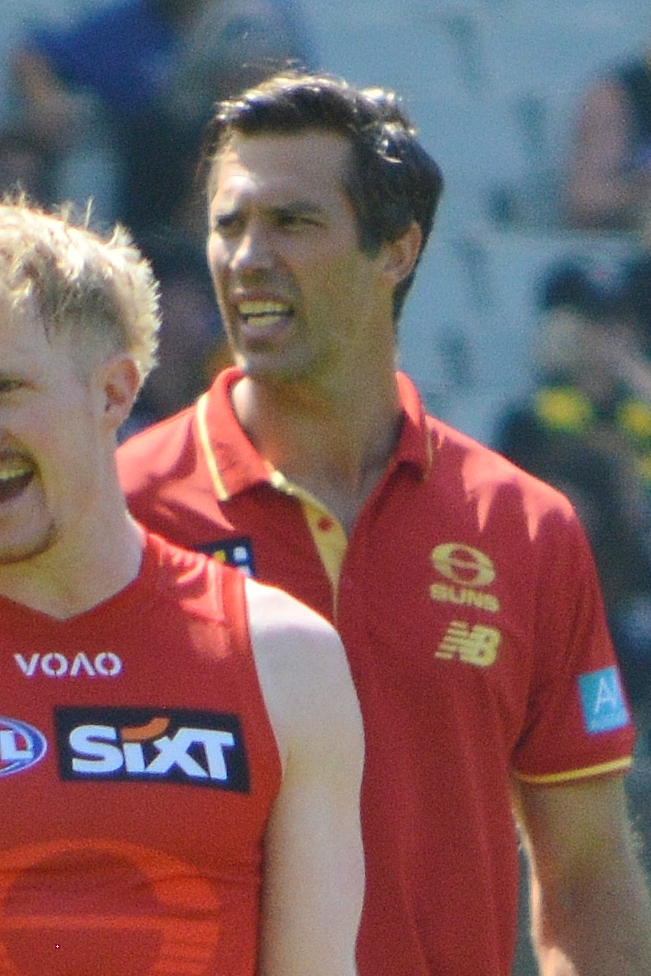
Rance as an assistant coach for AFL team Gold Coast in March 2026

In 2016 and 2017 Rance appeared regularly as a guest panelist and special segment host on The Footy Show. He also worked as a co-host on the AFL Exchange podcast for AFL Media in 2016. In 2017, Rance became a presenter on the Nine Network lifestyle and travel show Postcards.

In 2016 Rance founded The Academy, an Australian rules football school for high school students. The program, which Rance is credited with conceiving, is designed to provide students opportunities in sport outside traditional pathways. Graduating students will earn a Victorian Certificate of Applied Learning. The Academy closed in 2023 as a result of COVID-19 lockdowns, a decline in students, teacher shortages in Victoria, and the school’s inability to scale up.

Rance is also a published children's book author, having penned Tiger's Roar in 2018 and Rabbit's Hop and Monkey's Tail in 2019.

== Personal life ==
Rance is the son of former Footscray and West Coast player Murray Rance, and is the cousin of former Carlton player David Ellard.

Rance is a devout Jehovah's Witness. Rance married partner Georgia in December 2012. The pair separated in December 2019, around the time of Rance's retirement from AFL football.

While playing football he has studied but not completed courses in carpentry, building and piloting as well as completing part-time work in real estate sales.

In 2011, Rance was the victim of stalking by a man who was later sentenced to 12 months in prison for incidents also including harassment and soliciting cash while posing as a doctor.

In 2025, Rance married partner Karinda.

He has Indian heritage.

== Statistics ==
Legend
G	Goals	K	Kicks	D	Disposals	T	Tackles
B	Behinds	H	Handballs	M	Marks

Season	Team	No.	Games	Totals							Averages (per game)						
Season	Team	No.	Games	G	B	K	H	D	M	T	G	B	K	H	D	M	T
2008	Richmond	18	0	—	—	—	—	—	—	—	—	—	—	—	—	—	—
2009	Richmond	18	15	1	2	69	135	204	47	43	0.1	0.1	4.6	9.0	13.6	3.1	2.9
2010	Richmond	18	10	6	3	55	66	121	36	23	0.6	0.3	5.5	6.6	12.1	3.6	2.3
2011	Richmond	18	19	0	0	190	155	345	113	49	0.0	0.0	10.0	8.2	18.2	5.9	2.6
2012	Richmond	18	22	0	0	236	159	395	136	48	0.0	0.0	10.7	7.2	18.0	6.2	2.2
2013	Richmond	18	23	1	0	226	156	382	153	50	0.0	0.0	9.8	6.8	16.6	6.7	2.2
2014	Richmond	18	18	0	0	154	158	312	104	49	0.0	0.0	8.6	8.8	17.3	5.8	2.7
2015	Richmond	18	23	0	0	203	196	399	135	68	0.0	0.0	8.8	8.5	17.4	5.9	3.0
2016	Richmond	18	20	0	0	212	161	373	155	43	0.0	0.0	10.6	8.1	18.7	7.8	2.2
2017	Richmond	18	25	1	0	229	171	400	130	59	0.0	0.0	9.2	6.8	16.0	5.2	2.4
2018	Richmond	18	24	0	0	198	187	385	133	35	0.0	0.0	8.3	7.8	16.0	5.5	1.5
2019	Richmond	18	1	0	0	3	3	6	2	2	0.0	0.0	3.0	3.0	6.0	2.0	2.0
Career			200	9	5	1775	1547	3322	1144	469	0.0	0.0	8.9	7.8	16.7	5.7	2.3

== Honours and achievements ==
Team

- AFL premiership player: 2017
- McClelland Trophy (Richmond): 2018

Individual

- 5× All-Australian team: 2014, 2015, 2016, 2017, 2018
- All-Australian Captain: 2017
- 22under22 team: 2012
- Jack Dyer Medal (RFC B&F): 2015
- Richmond vice-captain: 2017–2019
- Richmond most improved player: 2011
- 6× Francis Bourke award (Richmond best clubman)

Junior

- U18 National Championship: 2007
- U18 All-Australian: 2007
